= World Scrabble Championship 2019 =

Scrabble tournament

- 19 November 2019 – 24 November 2019
- Number of players: 46
- Location: England

The Mattel World Scrabble Championship 2019 was a Scrabble tournament organised by Mattel and Mindsports Academy (MSA) to determine the world champion in English Scrabble held from 19 to 24 November 2019.

The event was split into two divisions according to players' World English-Language Scrabble Players' Association (WESPA) ratings; the top division comprised some 46 players. 35 games were played on the first four days, after which the top eight proceeded to a 3-game quarterfinals, with the winners advancing to a 5-game semifinals on the same day; the top two players, defending champion Nigel Richards and 2017 champion David Eldar, played a best-of-five final the day after for the top prize of $8,000. Richards beat Eldar 3–1 to earn an unprecedented fifth world title.

== Background ==
The main event was preceded by a Junior World Scrabble Championship (JWSC) from 16 to 18 November that was won by 13-year-old Pakistani Syed Imaad Ali. The World Scrabble Championship 2019 took place at the Riveria International Centre in Torquay, Devon, England from 19 to 24 November. The prize fund for the tournament was $20,000. There were also concurrent events played in five different languages including Catalan, Spanish, French, Norwegian, and German. Three former world champions participated in the main event, including four-time world champion and three-time defending champion Nigel Richards (2007, 2011, 2013, 2018), Brett Smitheram (one title: 2016), and David Eldar (one title: 2017). Former world championship finalists Chris Lipe (2014) and Harshan Lamabadusuriya (2017), alongside former North American Scrabble Championship winners Dave Wiegand (2005, 2009) and Peter Armstrong (2015), also took part in the tournament.

== Results ==
=== Preliminary ===
After 35 preliminary rounds, the top eight in the 46-man division advanced to the quarter-finals. Nigel Richards, David Eldar, Harshan Lamabadusuriya, Peter Armstrong, and Dave Wiegand qualified, alongside JWSC winner Syed Imaad Ali, Paul Gallen, and Jason Keller; Brett Smitheram and Chris Lipe were knocked out of contention, finishing eleventh and fourteenth respectively.

Position	Name	Number of wins	Cumulative spread
1	Nigel Richards (NZL)	29	+3578
2	David Eldar (AUS)	23	+1995
3	Harshan Lamabadusuriya (LKA)	22	+1698
4	Paul Gallen (NIR)	22	+1268
5	Jason Keller (USA)	22	+713
6	Peter Armstrong (USA)	21.5	+341
7	Dave Wiegand (USA)	21	+1273
8	Syed Imaad Ali (PAK)	21	+656

=== Knockout ===
Quarterfinals (best of 3)
1	Nigel Richards (NZL)	2
8	Syed Imaad Ali (PAK)	1
4	Jason Keller (USA)	1
5	Paul Gallen (NIR)	2
2	Harshan Lamabadusuriya (LKA)	1
7	Peter Armstrong (USA)	2
3	Dave Wiegand (USA)	0
6	David Eldar (AUS)	2

Semifinals (best of 5)
Nigel Richards (NZL)	3
Paul Gallen (NIR)	1
Peter Armstrong (USA)	1
David Eldar (AUS)	3

Final (best of 5)
Nigel Richards (NZL)	392	416	496	516
David Eldar (AUS)	428	402	363	463

=== Finals ===
Nigel Richards (NZL)	David Eldar (AUS)
3	1
Born 1967; 52 years old	Born 1990; 29 years old
Finalist and winner of the World Scrabble Championship 2007, World Scrabble Championship 2011, World Scrabble Championship 2013, and World Scrabble Championship 2018	Finalist and winner of the World Scrabble Championship 2017
WESPA Rating: 2176 (World No. 2)	WESPA Rating: 2157 (World No. 3)

Round	Nigel Richards	David Eldar
1	392	428
2	416	402
3	496	363
4	516	463
5	—	—

The two finalists were New Zealander Nigel Richards and Australian poker player and real estate agent David Eldar. Both were former world champions; Richards won the world championship in 2007, 2011, and 2013, and was also the defending champion, while Eldar clinched the title in 2017. Richards triumphed 3–1, winning three games in a row after conceding the opening game to Eldar, and became world champion for an unprecedented fifth time. Notable plays by Richards included the 140-pointer GHOSTIER and UPGAZED (106). A best-of-five third-place playoff was contested by Paul Gallen and Peter Armstrong; Gallen won 3–2.
