= World Scrabble Championship 2018 =

Board game championship

- 23 October 2018 – 28 October 2018
- Winner: Nigel Richards
- Number of players: 75
- Location: England

The Mattel World Scrabble Championship 2018 was a Scrabble tournament organised by Mattel and Mindsports Academy (MSA) to determine the world champion in English Scrabble held from 23 to 28 October 2018.

The event was split into two divisions according to players' World English-Language Scrabble Players' Association (WESPA) ratings; the top division comprised some 75 players. 35 games were played on the first four days, after which the top eight proceeded to a 3-game quarterfinals, with the winners advancing to a 5-game semifinals on the same day; the top two players, Nigel Richards and Jesse Day, played a best-of-five final the day after for the top prize of €10,000. Richards beat Day 3–1, becoming world champion for an unprecedented fourth time.

== Background ==
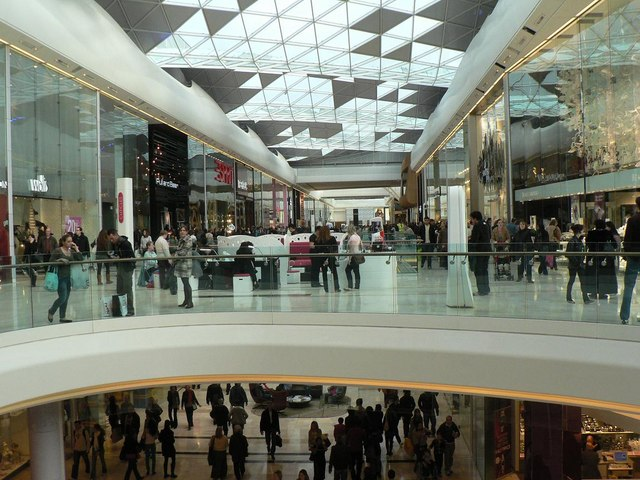
The finals took place at the Westfield Shopping Centre in London.

The main event was preceded by a Junior World Scrabble Championship that was won by Pakistani Moiz Ullah Baig. The World Scrabble Championship 2018 took place at the Riveria International Centre in Torquay, Devon, England from 23 to 27 October, with the finals being held at a "clearview cube" in the Westfield Shopping Centre in London a day later, as part of Scrabble's 70th anniversary celebrations. The prize fund for the tournament was £15,500. There were also concurrent events played in five different languages including Catalan, Spanish, French, Norwegian, and German.

== Results ==
=== Preliminary ===
After 35 preliminary rounds, the top eight, which included three-time world champion Nigel Richards (2007, 2011, 2013), world champions Brett Smitheram (2016) and Wellington Jighere (2015), and 2014 runner-up Chris Lipe, advanced to the quarter-finals. The defending champion David Eldar was absent, whereas former world champions Craig Beevers (2014), Joel Wapnick (1999), and Mark Nyman (1993) were knocked out of contention.

Position	Name	Number of wins	Cumulative spread
1	Nigel Richards	29	+1893
2	Jesse Day	25	+1716
3	Kevin McMahon	25	+1098
4	Brett Smitheram	23.5	+1056
5	Paul Gallen	23.5	+1052
6	Wellington Jighere	22.5	+1228
7	Chris Lipe	22	+1317
8	Paul Allan	21.5	+330
9	Chris Vicary	21.5	−278
10	Dave Koenig	21	+1392

=== Knockout ===
Quarterfinals (best of 3)
1	Nigel Richards	2
8	Paul Allan	0
4	Paul Gallen	1
5	Brett Smitheram	2
2	Kevin McMahon	2
7	Wellington Jighere	1
3	Chris Lipe	1
6	Jesse Day	2

Semifinals (best of 5)
Nigel Richards	3
Brett Smitheram	0
Kevin McMahon	0
Jesse Day	3

Final (best of 5)
Nigel Richards	3
Jesse Day	1

=== Finals ===
Nigel Richards (NZL)	Jesse Day (USA)
3	1
Born 1967; 51 years old	Born 1987; 31 years old
Finalist and winner of the World Scrabble Championship 2007, World Scrabble Championship 2011, and World Scrabble Championship 2013	Finalist
WESPA Rating: 2260 (World No. 2)	WESPA Rating: 1937 (World No. 62)

Round	Nigel Richards	Jesse Day
1	391	541
2	536	307
3	445	423
4	575	452
5	–	–

Malaysia-based Nigel Richards, who was born in New Zealand, defeated American data-scientist Jesse Day in the best-of-five finals; Richards had previously won the world championship in 2007, 2011, and 2013, as well as the French world championship in 2013 and 2018. Notable plays by Richards included GROUTIER for 64 points, ZONULAR (100) and PHENOLIC (84), while Day managed a 95-pointer MALEDICT. Richards, who was awarded £6,200, described the championship as "closely-fought", while praising Day for being an "impressive opponent".
