= Harshan Lamabadusuriya =

Sri Lankan-British Scrabble player and doctor

- Education: S. Thomas' College, Mount Lavinia; Royal College, Colombo; Richmond College, Galle; Steyning Grammar School
- Alma mater: University of Oxford; University of Cambridge
- Occupation: Professional Scrabble player
- Known for: 2017 World Scrabble Championship runners-up 2023 World Scrabble Championship runners-up

Harshan Lamabadusuriya is a Sri Lankan-born British professional Scrabble player and paediatrician.

== Biography ==
Harshan was raised in Sri Lanka, attending three different schools: S. Thomas' College, Mount Lavinia, Richmond College, Galle and Royal College, Colombo. He began playing Scrabble at a very young age as he mastered the game techniques and developed his vocabulary by competing at various local Scrabble competitions predominantly at school level. He also collected titles and trophies in various Scrabble tournaments as a result of his early exposure to the game. In 1996, Lamabadusuriya migrated with his family to the UK and settled there. He insisted that he was a problematic child, including mediocre results in his early schooling. His move to the UK turned out to be a turning point in his academic journey.

== Career ==
After moving to the United Kingdom, he continued with his passion for Scrabble and took part in local Scrabble competitions. He also excelled in his education including the result of 5 As in his A-levels while studying at Steyning Grammar School. He began his medical studies at the University of Cambridge and later transferred to the University of Oxford, where he completed his clinical studies. He chose to work as a locum consultant pediatrician for a period of two years at Worthing Hospital. He then started working at Swindon Hospital.

Harshan regularly participated in various international Scrabble competitions representing the United Kingdom including the World Scrabble Championship in 2001, 2005, 2007 and 2009. He reached a career high after emerging victorious as the National British Scrabble Champion at the UK National Scrabble Championship in 2003. He registered the highest ever scoring word in Scrabble with the word "Kreuzers", scoring 329 points. He emerged as runner-up to Australia's David Eldar in the best-of-five finals during the World Scrabble Championship 2017 and Lamabadusuriya went into the final ranked number 16 in the world. During the 2017 Scrabble World Championship, he maintained an almost perfect run throughout the tournament. This included a victory over 1993 Scrabble World Champion Mark Nyman in the quarterfinals, only lose to Eldar in the final 3-0. He collected £3000 as a cash reward for his second-place finish in the competition. He competed in the World Scrabble Championship 2019 where he qualified for the knockout round in the quarterfinal stage, but he was eliminated with a 2-1 defeat to USA's Peter Armstrong.

Harshan competed in the 2023 edition of the World Scrabble Championship where he achieved second-place in the tournament after emerging as runner-up to David Eldar. In January 2025, he won the UK Open Scrabble Championships, receiving a cash prize of £500 prize after winning 21 of his 27 games throughout the competition. He described that the game-defining word "backstory", which he had played during a critical moment of the final, as a eureka moment.
