= World Scrabble Championship =

Competition to determine the World Champion in Scrabble

- Sport: Scrabble
- Founded: 1991
- Most recent champion: Adam Logan (2nd title) (2025)
- Sponsors: Mattel, MSA

The World Scrabble Championship (WSC) is played to determine the world champion in competitive English-language Scrabble. It was held in every odd year from 1991 to 2013; from 2013 onwards, it became an annual event.

The most successful player in world championship history is Nigel Richards from New Zealand, who won a record five titles between 2007 and 2019.

== History ==
Sponsorship of the World Scrabble Championship (WSC) formerly alternated between Hasbro and Mattel, the North American and global owners of the Scrabble trademark, respectively. However, after Hasbro declined to sponsor WSC 2005, Mattel has organized and sponsored all championships. Mind Sports International (MSI) began sponsoring the event in 2013 after successfully organizing their own major Scrabble tournament in Prague in 2012. As of 2018, it has been sponsored by Mindsports Academy.

On 17 May 2013, Mattel announced that the event would be renamed the Scrabble Champions Tournament, and the tournament would be held annually as part of Mind Sports International's Prague Mind Sports Festival. MSI introduced a 'Last Chance Qualifier' tournament, giving players a last opportunity to qualify for 5 places in the main event if they failed to achieve a place on their national team. A four-way knockout stage was introduced for the top four finishers, which consisted of a best-of-3 semi-final followed by a best-of-5 final. Nigel Richards became World Champion here, making him the first player to defend his world title.

In 2014 the Scrabble Champions Tournament continued in London, but it became an open event, with all players invited to compete. A quarter-final stage was added, meaning that the top 8 progressed to the knockout stages. Craig Beevers won the event, making him the first British World Scrabble Champion since Mark Nyman in 1993.

In 2015, following cancellation of the SCT, Mattel and MSI agreed to allow WESPA to organize the 2015 WESPA Championship (WESPAC). It was held in Perth, Australia and followed the invitational format of pre-MSI WSC events. 130 players qualified to play. Wellington Jighere of Nigeria emerged as WESPA Champion after beating Lewis Mackay 4–0 in the final.

In 2016, the tournament was split into two divisions based on players' rankings. MSI also hosted world championships in other languages, including French, German, Spanish and Catalan, alongside the French Duplicate Championship.

The 2017 MSI World Championships followed the same format as the 2016 event. This was won by Australian David Eldar.

The 2018 World Scrabble Championship was organised by Mindsports Academy. The main event was held in Torquay, Devon, but the best-of-5 final was held in London to celebrate the game's 70th anniversary. The event was won by Nigel Richards.

In 2019 Nigel Richards went on to defend his title (and win his fifth championship) against David Eldar at the Riviera International Centre in Torquay.

After 2019, unofficial world championships are held at WESPAC because WESPA has been denied permission from Mattel and/or Hasbro to be called an official world championship.

== List of finals ==
Year	Winner	Score	Runner-up	Location	Entrants	Winner's prize	Total prize pool	Sponsor
1991	(United States) Peter Morris	2–1	(United States) Brian Cappelletto	(England) London, United Kingdom	48	US$10,000	US$19,000	Spears
1993	(England) Mark Nyman	3–2	(Canada) Joel Wapnick	Plaza Hotel, New York City, United States	64	US$10,000	US$24,950	Hasbro
1995	(Canada) David Boys	3–2	(United States) Joel Sherman	(England) Park Lane Hotel, Piccadilly, London, United Kingdom	64	US$11,000	US$29,550	Mattel
1997	(United States) Joel Sherman	3–1	(United States) Matt Graham	Mayflower Hotel, Washington, D.C., United States	80	US$25,000	US$50,100	Hasbro
1999	(Canada) Joel Wapnick	3–1	(England) Mark Nyman	Carlton Crest Hotel, Melbourne, Australia	98	US$15,000	US$34,200	Mattel
2001	(United States) Brian Cappelletto	3–1	(Canada) Joel Wapnick	Venetian Hotel, Las Vegas, United States	88	US$25,000	US$50,100	Hasbro
2003	(Thailand) Panupol Sujjayakorn	3–2	(Thailand) Pakorn Nemitrmansuk	Corus Hotel, Kuala Lumpur, Malaysia	90	US$17,500	US$40,000	Mattel
2005	(Canada) Adam Logan	3–0	(Thailand) Pakorn Nemitrmansuk	(England) Marriott Regent's Park Hotel, London, United Kingdom	102	US$15,000	US$30,500	Mattel
2007	(New Zealand) Nigel Richards	3–2	(Malaysia) Ganesh Asirvatham	Taj President Hotel, Mumbai, India	104	US$15,000	US$30,500	Mattel
2009	(Thailand) Pakorn Nemitrmansuk	3–1	(New Zealand) Nigel Richards	Zon Regency Hotel, Johor Bahru, Malaysia	108	US$15,000	US$30,500	Mattel
2011	(New Zealand) Nigel Richards (2)	3–2	(Australia) Andrew Fisher	Hilton Hotel, Warsaw, Poland	106	US$20,000	US$50,000	Mattel
2013	(New Zealand) Nigel Richards (3)	3–2	(Thailand) Komol Panyasophonlert	Andel's Hotel, Prague, Czech Republic	110	US$10,000	US$25,000	Mattel, MSI
2014	(England) Craig Beevers	3–1	(United States) Chris Lipe	(England) ExCeL Arena, London, United Kingdom	108	£3,000	£7,000	Mattel, MSI
2015	(Nigeria) Wellington Jighere	4–0	(England) Lewis Mackay	Gloucester Park, Perth, Australia	130	A$10,000	A$28,400	WESPA (1)
2016	(England) Brett Smitheram	3–0	(England) Mark Nyman	Grand Palais, Lille, France	72	€7,000	€40,000	Mattel, MSI
2017	(Australia) David Eldar	3–0	(England) Harshan Lamabadusuriya	(England) Nottingham, United Kingdom	77	£7,000		Mattel, MSI
2018	(New Zealand) Nigel Richards (4)	3–1	(United States) Jesse Day	(England) Torquay (final in Westfield London), United Kingdom	75	£6,200	£15,500	Mattel, MSA
2019	(New Zealand) Nigel Richards (5)	3–1	(Australia) David Eldar	(England) Riviera International Centre, Torquay, United Kingdom	46	$8,000		Mattel, MSA
2023	(Australia) David Eldar (2)	4–3	(England) Harshan Lamabadusuriya	Las Vegas, United States	134	$10,000		WESPA
2025	(Canada) Adam Logan (2)	4–2	(New Zealand) Nigel Richards	The Palms by Eagles, Airport City, Accra, Ghana	129	$10,000	$34,000	WESPA

From 1993 to 2023, New Zealand, represented by Nigel Richards with his 5 victories, is the most successful country participating in the World Scrabble Championship. This accounts for 27.8% of the total wins. Canada has 4 victories. The United States of America and England each secured 3 victories, placing them in third place.

== Championships by country ==
Country	Titles^{[1]}
New Zealand	5
Canada	4
USA	3
England	3
Thailand	2
Australia	2
Nigeria	1

== See also ==
- World Youth Scrabble Championships
- List of world championships in mind sports
