= World Scrabble Championship 2016 =

- 31 August 2016 – 4 September 2016
- Winner: Brett Smitheram
- Number of players: 72
- Location: Lille, France

The MSI World Scrabble Championship 2016 was a Scrabble tournament organised by Mattel and Mindsports International (MSI) to determine the world champion in English Scrabble. It was held from 31 August to 4 September 2016 in Lille, France.

The event was split into two divisions based on players' World English-Language Scrabble Players' Association (WESPA) ratings. The top division comprised some 72 players. 24 games were played on the first three days, after which the top eight proceeded to a 3-game quarterfinals, with the winners advancing to a 5-game semifinals on the same day; the top two players, Brett Smitheram and Mark Nyman, played a best-of-five final the day after for the top prize of €7,000. Smitheram beat Nyman 3–0. The World Championship was held in conjunction with that of Scrabble in other languages.

== Background ==
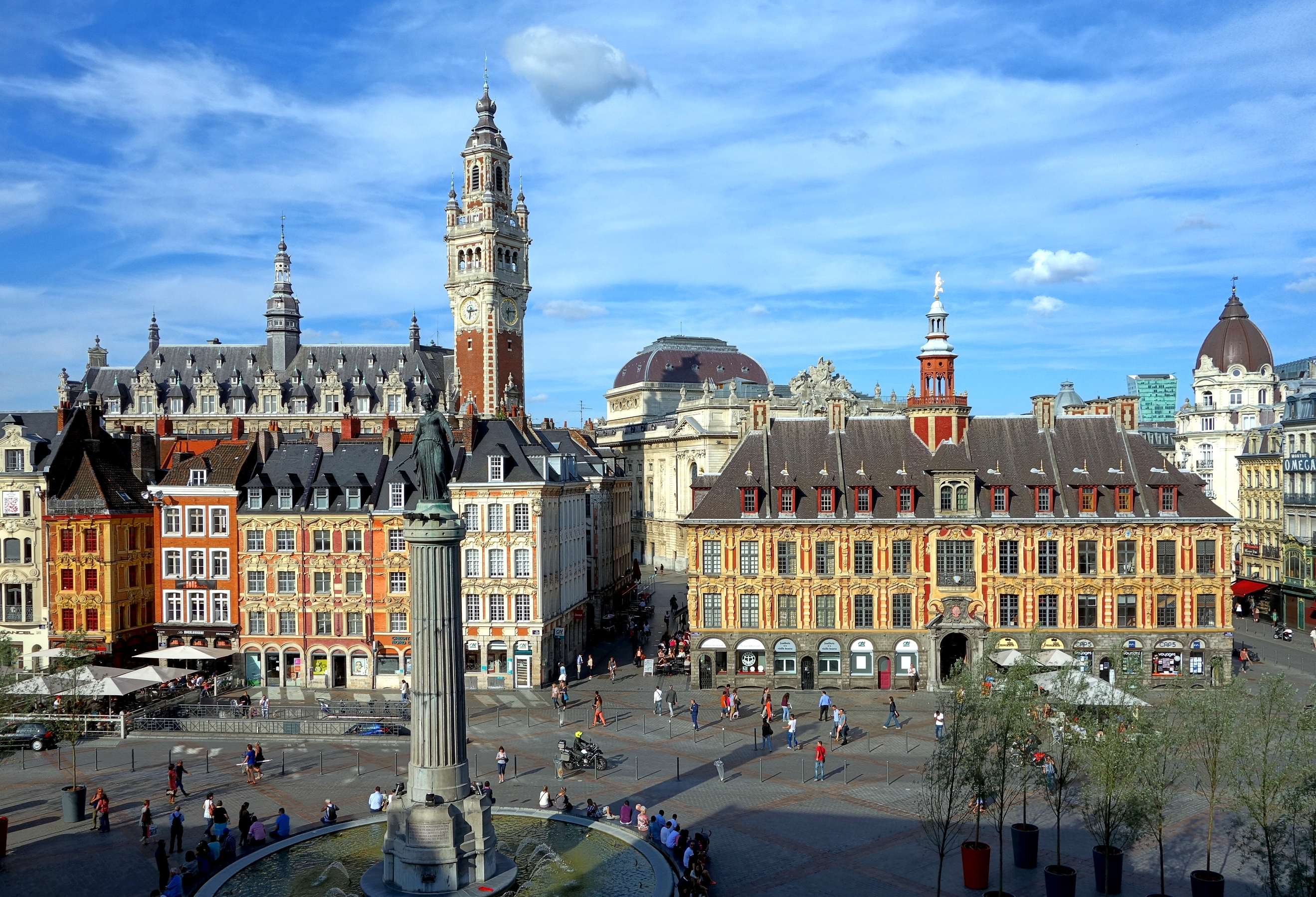
The MSI World Scrabble Championship 2016 was held in Lille, France.

The MSI World Scrabble Championship 2016 was held from 31 August to 4 September 2016 under the auspices of Mindsports International and sponsored by Mattel and HarperCollins (the publisher of the official lexicon used in play), as part of the Mindsports International 2016 Championships. The playing venue was the Lille Grand Palais. There were two divisions based on players' WESPA ratings: A (1700 and above, or by invitation by WESPA or the World Mind Sports Federation) and B (below 1700 or unrated). MSI also hosted World Championships in other languages, including French, German, Spanish and Catalan, alongside the French Duplicate Championship.

== Participants ==
The top division comprised a total of 72 players, as listed below alphabetically.

- Adam Logan (CAN), 2107
- Allan Simmons (SCO), 2094
- Austin Shin (ENG), 2025
- Barry Grossman (ENG), 1709
- Bob Jackman (AUS), 1736
- Brett Smitheram (ENG), 2170
- Charles Micallef (MLT), 1520
- Charles Tachie (GHA), 1985
- Chris Lipe (USA), 1869
- Chris Vicary (ENG), 1812
- Craig Beevers (ENG), 2157
- Dan Sandu (ROU), 1511
- David Delicata (MLT), 1795
- David Eldar (AUS), 2220
- David Koenig (USA), 2013
- David Webb (ENG), 2002
- Dave Wiegand (USA), 2168
- Dennis Ikekeregor (NGA), 2048
- Elie Dangoor (ENG), 1767
- Eta Karo (NGA), 2015
- Evan Berofsky (CAN), 2053
- Evan Cohen (ISR), 1969
- Evans Clinchy (USA), 2061
- Femi Awowade (ENG), 1837
- Gerry Carter (THA), 1781
- Gunnar Andersson (SWE), 1573
- Hasham Hadi Khan (PAK), 1093
- Herve Bohbot (FRA), 1500
- Jack Durand (ENG), 1437
- Jakkrit Klaphajone (THA), 2012
- Jason Broersma (CAN), 1565
- Jason Keller (USA), 1869
- Jason Tsang (HKG), 1047
- Jason Ubeika (CAN), 1632
- Jesse Day (USA), 1986
- Joel Wapnick (CAN), 1990
- Karen Richards (AUS), 1528
- Komol Panyasoponlert (THA), 2145
- Kunihiko Kuroda (JPN), 1140
- Leslie Charles (TTO), 1717
- Lewis McKay (ENG), 2115
- Lucas Freeman (USA), 1817
- Mark Nyman (ENG), 2065
- Marlon Prudencio (SGP), 1870
- Martin Teo (MYS), 1804
- Michael Tang (SGP), 1730
- Mohan Chunkath (IND), 1702
- Moiz Ullah Baig (PAK), 1792
- Natalie Zolty (ENG), 1705
- Neil Scott (SCO), 1923
- Nigel Richards (MYS), 2258
- Omri Rosenkrantz (ISR), 1539
- Orlet Bullock (BAR), 1770
- Paul Allan (SCO), 2015
- Peter Armstrong (USA), 2053
- Puneet Sharma (USA), 1571
- Rafal Dominiczak (POL), 1828
- Rik Kennedy (NIR), 1816
- Robert Linn (USA), 1808
- Rob Robinsky (USA), 2024
- Scott Jackson (USA), 1661
- Shan Abbasi (CAN), 1588
- Stefan Rau (USA), 1821
- Stephen Hunt (ENG), 1797
- Steve Perry (ENG), 1655
- Terry Kirk (ENG), 1851
- Trevor Halsall (AUS), 1933
- Vincent Boyle (ENG), 1747
- Waseem Khatri (PAK), 1928
- Wayne Kelly (ENG), 1873
- Wellington Jighere (NGA), 2132
- Winter (USA), 1774

== Results ==
=== Preliminary ===
After 24 preliminary rounds, the top eight advanced to the quarterfinals. Three-time World Champion Nigel Richards (2007, 2011, and 2013) failed to qualify for the knockout rounds, as did 2015 and 2014 World Champions Wellington Jighere and Craig Beevers.

Position	Name	Number of wins	Cumulative spread
1	Mark Nyman	19	+1262
2	David Webb	19	+1152
3	Allan Simmons	18	+974
4	Robert Robinsky	17	+1216
5	Brett Smitheram	16	+1424
6	Adam Logan	16	+854
7	Lewis MacKay	16	+771
8	Joel Wapnick	16	+676
9	David Koenig	15	+334
10	Paul Allan	15	+175
11	Dennis Ikekeregor	15	−50
12	Terry Kirk	14½	+155
13	Nigel Richards	14	+987
14	Peter Armstrong	14	+985
15	Moiz Ullah Baig	14	+924
16	Evans Clinchy	14	+649
17	Winter	14	+393
18	David Eldar	14	+312
19	Scott Jackson	14	+224
20	Jason Keller	14	+93

=== Knockout ===
Quarterfinals (best of 3)
1	Allan Simmons	0
8	Adam Logan	2
4	Robert Robinsky	0
5	Brett Smitheram	2
2	David Webb	1
7	Lewis MacKay	2
3	Mark Nyman	2
6	Joel Wapnick	1

Semifinals (best of 5)
Lewis MacKay	2
Brett Smitheram	3
Adam Logan	2
Mark Nyman	3

Final (best of 5)
Brett Smitheram	3
Mark Nyman	0

Semi-finals losers Lewis MacKay and 2005 World Champion Adam Logan were scheduled to play a best-of-three third-place playoff, but Logan forfeited and MacKay automatically clinched the title of second runner-up.

=== Finals ===
Brett Smitheram (ENG)	Mark Nyman (ENG)
3	0
Born 8 March 1979; 37 years old	Born 14 October 1966; 50 years old
Finalist	Finalist and winner of the World Scrabble Championship 1993
WESPA Rating: 2170 (World No. 3)	WESPA Rating: 2065 (World No. 20)

Round	Brett Smitheram	Mark Nyman
1	583	323
2	451	403
3	638	351
4	–	–
5	–	–

UK-based recruitment consultant Brett Smitheram beat fellow Englishman and writer Mark Nyman, the 1993 World Scrabble Champion, 3–0 in the best-of-five finals, and became the 2016 World Scrabble Champion and won €7,000. Notable plays by Smitheram included BRACONID for 181 points (176 points plus 5 points for an unsuccessful challenge by Nyman), GYNAECIA (95) and PERIAGUA (76). Incidentally, Smitheram was a former contestant on the television programme Countdown, and Nyman was one of its producers. In the second division, Jack Mpakaboari beat Sandy Nang 3–0 in a best-of-five finals.
