= Brand's Crossword Game King's Cup =

Thai Scrabble tournament

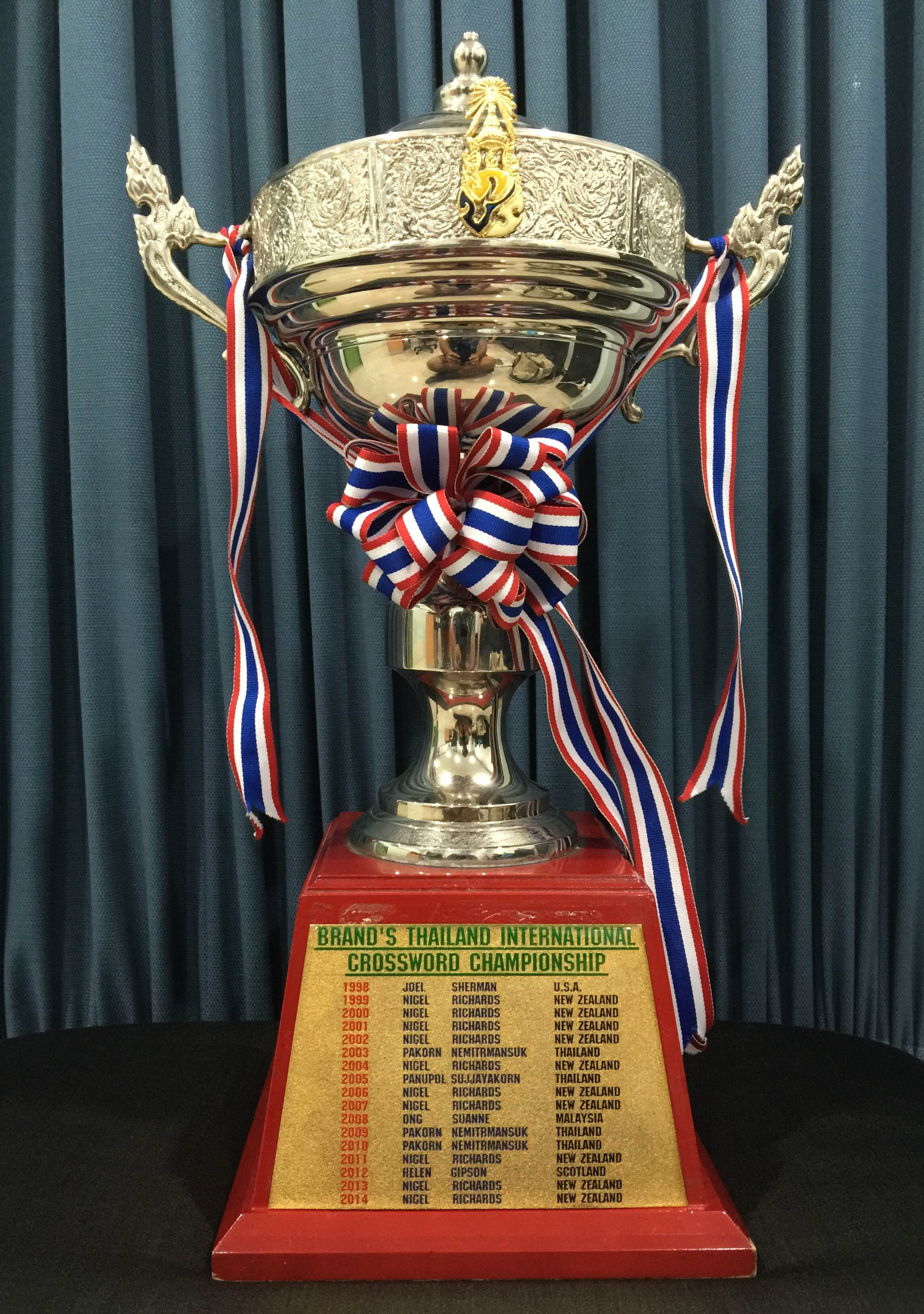
Brand's Crossword Game King's Cup Trophy

The Brand's Crossword Game King's Cup is the Thai national Scrabble competition in the English language. It has also been known as the Thailand International in the past. Since 2024 it is known as the Bangkok International Crossword Game Championship.

The trophy for the most prestigious division is from The King of Thailand. It is the largest Scrabble tournament in the world, in terms of the number of players, drawing as many as 8,000 players.

In Thailand, Scrabble is promoted like a sport and as a way to learn English. The international players are honoured by the king. As a result, Thailand has produced two world champions, as well as many top international players.

== Results ==
Year	Winner	Runner up
2025	Komol Panyasophonlert (2) Thailand)	Ming Hui Hubert Wee (Singapore)
2024	Panupol Sujjayakorn (2) Thailand)	Ming Hui Hubert Wee (Singapore)
2019	Nigel Richards (15) (New Zealand)	Jesse Day (United States)
2018	Nigel Richards (14) (New Zealand)	Panupol Sujjayakorn (Thailand)
2017	Komol Panyasophonlert (1) (Thailand)	Adam Logan (Canada)
2016	Nigel Richards (13) (New Zealand)	Pichai Limprasert (Thailand)
2015	Nigel Richards (12) (New Zealand)	Ming Hui Hubert Wee (Singapore)
2014	Nigel Richards (11) (New Zealand)	Panupol Sujjayakorn (Thailand)
2013	Nigel Richards (10) (New Zealand)	Komol Panyasophonlert (Thailand)
2012	Helen Gipson (1) (Scotland)	Thacha Koowirat (Thailand)
2011	Nigel Richards (9) (New Zealand)	Komol Panyasophonlert (Thailand)
2010	Pakorn Nemitrmansuk (4) (Thailand)	David Eldar (Australia)
2009	Pakorn Nemitrmansuk (3) (Thailand)	Charnwit Sukhumrattanaporn (Thailand)
2008	Ong Suanne (1) (Malaysia)	Nigel Richards (New Zealand)
2007	Nigel Richards (8) (New Zealand)	Komol Panyasophonlert (Thailand)
2006	Nigel Richards (7) (New Zealand)	Femi Awowade (England)
2005	Panupol Sujjayakorn (1) (Thailand)	Nigel Richards (New Zealand)
2004	Nigel Richards (6) (New Zealand)	Andrew Fisher (Australia)
2003	Pakorn Nemitrmansuk (2) (Thailand)	Ganesh Asirvatham (Malaysia)
2002	Nigel Richards (5) (New Zealand)	Femi Awowade (England)
2001	Nigel Richards (4) (New Zealand)	Paul Cleary (Australia)
2000	Nigel Richards (3) (New Zealand)	Jakkrit Klaphajone (Thailand)
2000†	Nigel Richards (2) (New Zealand)	Jakkrit Klaphajone (Thailand)
1999	Nigel Richards (1) (New Zealand)	Naween Tharanga Fernando (Australia)
1999†	Mark Nyman (1) (England)	Nigel Richards (New Zealand)
1998	Joel Sherman (1) (United States)	Charnwit Sukhumrattanaporn (Thailand)
1997	Jakkrit Klaphajone (2) (Thailand)	Charnwit Sukhumrattanaporn (Thailand)
1996	Charnwit Sukhumrattanaporn (1) (Thailand)	Jakkrit Klaphajone (Thailand)
1995	Jakkrit Klaphajone (1) (Thailand)	Sam Kantimathi (United States)
1994	Sam Kantimathi (1) (United States)	Pakorn Nemitrmansuk (Thailand)
1993	Ong-Arj Charuwan (Thailand)	Sam Kantimathi (United States)
1992	Pakorn Nemitrmansuk (1) (Thailand)	Mark Nyman (England)
1991	Mark Nyman (1) (England)	Pakorn Nemitrmansuk (Thailand)
1990	Charles Goldstein (1) (United States)	Mark Nyman (England)
1989	Apichit Vichitjitkul (1) (Thailand)	John Ozag (United States)

- The Thai International tournaments are generally held around late June to early July
- † These two tournaments were held in January under different sponsorship

== See also ==
- World Scrabble Championship
- World Youth Scrabble Championships
- Canadian Scrabble Championship
- National Scrabble Championship
- National School Scrabble Championship
