= Helen Gipson =

Scottish Scrabble player (born 1961)

Helen Gipson (born 27 September 1961) is a Scottish Scrabble player. On 4 December 2005, her ABSP rating peaked at third in Britain, making her the highest rated woman, and she is consistently rated as the top female player in the world. In January 2009, she won the UK Open beating a strong field including the world champion Nigel Richards.

A software engineer by trade, Gipson represented England in the World Scrabble Championship 1999 (where she finished 49th), 2003 (11th), 2005 (29th and again the top-rated woman), 2007 (15th), 2009 (10th) and 2011 (18th).

Her titles also include British Matchplay Scrabble Championship in 1998.

In 2012, Gipson was the first British player to win the Brands King's Cup in Bangkok, Thailand.
