= World English-Language Scrabble Players' Association =

Scrabble association

The World English-Language Scrabble Players' Association (WESPA) is the overarching global body for English-language national Scrabble associations and similar entities.

== Formation ==
WESPA was formed in the course of a players' meeting at the 2003 World Scrabble Championship in Kuala Lumpur, Malaysia, and formally constituted on 17 November 2005 at its first Biennial General Meeting held in London. BGMs are now held at each World Scrabble Championship (taking place every odd year), and there are currently 24 member organisations.

WESPA was created to represent the interests of international Scrabble competitors and national bodies worldwide. Its main functions are to promote global recognition of Scrabble as a serious competitive activity; to provide for the benefit of members in pursuing the game; to further the best interests of Scrabble and international tournament players; to represent such players in dealings with other bodies, including the trademark owners of the game; to promulgate and encourage international convergence towards common standards and norms (including international rules, word lists and ratings); to organise global competitions and events; to publish relevant material; and to maintain a website for the benefit of the game and its players.

The trademark for Scrabble is owned by Hasbro in North America and Mattel in the rest of the world.

Achievements to date have included the preparation of a set of international rules, the publication of a WESPA-endorsed word list which is valid for international tournament play, and the promulgation of international Scrabble ratings.

== Rules ==
Following a six-month worldwide consultation process, the first version of WESPA's rules for global Scrabble was released in August 2009. The rules were based on key elements of existing rules that were in force in various national associations, which were synthesised to create global best practice. Following feedback from their use in various international tournaments, extensive reviews took place prior to the issue of version two in November 2010, which was used at the 2011 World Scrabble Championship in Warsaw, Poland, and other international events such as the Causeway Challenge. Version three was released in 2015.

A number of national associations have adopted WESPA rules for domestic use, including the Association of British Scrabble Players.

== Word list ==
The word source currently in use for international play, known as Collins Scrabble Words or CSW (formerly Official Scrabble Words or OSW) is not derived from a single dictionary, but combines three components: Collins (7th edition, 2005), Chambers (1998 edition) and TWL, the current Northern American wordlist. TWL (Tournament Word List) is a subset of CSW, but is itself drawn from a range of sources, mostly different editions of Webster's. North American tournaments generally use TWL alone for domestic play, but all tournaments under the auspices of WESPA must use CSW.

The current word list (CSW19) came into force internationally on 1 July 2019, including updates from the most recent editions of original OSW sources as well as eliminating some inconsistencies in previous editions. CSW19 contains over 275,000 words in total (up to the theoretical maximum fifteen letters in length), of which around 119,000 are up to eight letters in length. By contrast, TWL holds approximately two thirds as many words in total. CSW is therefore substantially larger than TWL and has a more international flavour, including a number of local or dialect words from around the world.

== Ratings ==
International Scrabble ratings were maintained from their inception until 2022 by Bob Jackman in Sydney, Australia, using a variant of the Australian ratings calculation system. All tournaments played to WESPA rules are able to be rated within the system, and regular updates are posted on the WESPA website. The first rated tournament in the system was the 1993 World Scrabble Championship, which was held in New York. In 2025, a new ratings calculation system, the "RJR" system, was devised by Russell Honeybun (AUS) and Yong Jian Rong (SGP). Yong Jian Rong is the current WESPA Ratings Officer after his appointment to the role in 2026.

== Tournaments ==
WESPA has established the criteria for running international Scrabble tournaments, and it is now mandatory for WESPA rules and the WESPA word list to be used. Tournament organisers are also required to pay a ratings levy on a fee per player basis, in order for the tournament to qualify for international rating.

The tournament committee oversees the calendar of international Scrabble events, and has also liaised with Mattel on a number of issues relating to the World Scrabble Championship (WSC), including the number of games to be played and the format of the finals. Furthermore, a country's allocated number of representatives may fluctuate for each WSC depending on the team performance in the previous event, and WESPA has ratified the formula for changes to team allocations. In short, after each event the participating countries are ranked according to the average individual finishing rank of their players; teams falling in the top half may be entitled to gain a player for next time, while teams in the bottom half may lose a player.

Following the establishment of Mind Sports International, the title 'World Scrabble Championship' was claimed by that entity for official world titles (sanctioned by Mattel under licence). WESPA has undertaken to host biennial world events from 2015 onwards using the old WSC format, with teams qualifying from national organisations.

In 2015, the first WESPA Championship was an official World Scrabble Championship and was won by Wellington Jighere.

In 2017, the second WESPA Championship was held in Nairobi, Kenya in November, won by Akshay Bhandarkar.

In 2019, the third WESPA Championship was held in Goa, India. The best of seven final was contested between Nigel Richards and Jesse Day. The seventh and deciding game was won by Nigel Richards with a crucial triple-triple.

In 2021, the fourth WESPA Championship was called the WESPAC 2021 Virtual Gladiators Scrabble Championships and was held online at Woogles, hosted in Pakistan by the PSA (Pakistan Scrabble Association). In the seventh and final game, Alastair Richards of New Zealand won the title with a 13-point lead, defeating Australia's David Eldar.

In 2023, the fifth WESPA Championship in Las Vegas was won by David Eldar, who defeated Harshan Lamabadusuriya to capture the $10,000 first prize in a four-day, 32-game tournament.

In 2025, the sixth WESPA Championship in Accra, Ghana was won by Adam Logan, who defeated Nigel Richards four games to two, winning his second world title twenty years after his victory in the World Scrabble Championship 2005

== WESPA Championships (WESPAC) ==
| Year | Winner | Runner-up | Location | Entrants | Winner's prize | Total prize pool |
|---|---|---|---|---|---|---|
| 2015 | (Nigeria) Wellington Jighere | (England) Lewis Mackay | Gloucester Park, Perth, Australia | 130 | A$10,000 | A$28,400 |
| 2017 | (United Arab Emirates) Akshay Bhandarkar | (Nigeria) Moses Peter | Nairobi, Kenya | | US$20,000 | |
| 2019 | (New Zealand) Nigel Richards | (United States) Jesse Day | Goa, India | 140 | US$20,000 | |
| 2021 | (New Zealand) Alastair Richards | (Australia) David Eldar | Woogles and Pakistan | | €3,500 | |
| 2023 | (Australia) David Eldar | (England) Harshan Lamabadusuriya | Las Vegas | | US$10,000 | |
| 2025 | (Canada) Adam Logan | (New Zealand) Nigel Richards | The Palms by Eagles, Airport City, Accra, Ghana | 129 | $10,000 | $34,000 |

== Youth Scrabble ==
The World Youth Scrabble Championships, renamed WESPA Youth Cup for 2017 further to a naming issue with Mindsports Academy, have been organised annually since 2006 under the aegis of WESPA for players under 18 on qualification date. The Youth committee has also been active in promoting the game among young players worldwide, including training workshops held in various locations.

== Committee ==
The WESPA committee is made up of nominees representing member nations, and the current chair is Lukeman Owolabi (Ireland). Various subcommittees are charged with matters such as promotions and communications, ratings and tournaments, rules, dictionary and youth.

The first Chair of WESPA was Allan Simmons (UK) who led the organisation from inception through to 2008. He was succeeded by Bahrain-based Roy Kietzmann, who died in 2009 prior to the appointment of Elie Dangoor. In 2019, Dangoor resigned and was replaced by Chris Lipe, who was chair until 2025.

== Other federations ==
WESPA has committee links with the two other major world Scrabble federations, FISF (Fédération Internationale de Scrabble Francophone) and FISE (Federación Internacional de Scrabble en Español).

== Mailing list ==
The world-Scrabble mailing list discusses international Scrabble matters and WESPA issues.
