= Nigel Richards =

New Zealand Scrabble champion (born 1967)

- Born: 1967 (age 58–59); Christchurch, New Zealand
- Occupation: Scrabble player

Nigel Richards (born 1967) is a New Zealand Scrabble player. He became World Champion in 2007, and repeated the feat in 2011, 2013, 2018, and 2019. He also won the third World English-Language Scrabble Players' Association Championship (WESPAC) in 2019.

Richards is also a five-time U.S. national champion (four times consecutively from 2010 to 2013), a ten-time UK Open champion, a 17-time champion of the Singapore Open Scrabble Championship and a 15-time winner of the King's Cup in Bangkok, the world's biggest Scrabble competition.

In 2015, despite not speaking French, Richards won the French World Scrabble Championships, after reportedly spending nine weeks studying the French dictionary. He won it again in 2018, and multiple duplicate titles from 2017 to 2019. In 2025, Richards won the blitz, pair and duplicate title in Trois-Rivières, Canada.

In 2024, Richards accomplished a similar feat by winning the Spanish-language World Championships.

Renowned for his eidetic and mathematical abilities, Richards has been described as a reclusive person and has rarely been interviewed.

== Early life ==
Richards was born in 1967 in Christchurch, New Zealand. He initially attended Aranui High School, but switched to Lincoln High School when his stepfather's career meant the family had to move to Burnham Military Camp. He received a university scholarship, but chose not to attend, taking a job in a post office instead.

Richards was introduced to Scrabble by his mother, Adrienne Fischer, when he was 28. She chose the game because she was tired of his card-counting when they played 500. She thought he would be less good at Scrabble because he could not spell very well and had not been good at English at school.

In 2000, Richards moved from Christchurch to Kuala Lumpur, where he had been offered a job by a Malaysian Scrabble aficionado. His mother said that she believed his job involved closed-circuit television and security.

== Playing history ==
Richards started playing competitive Scrabble at New Zealand's Christchurch Scrabble Club. Since beginning his competitive career in 1996, he has won about 75% of his tournament games, collecting an estimated US$200,000 in prize money.

=== 2007 ===
Richards won the World Scrabble Championship and earned US$15,000 by winning a playoff, 3 games to 0, against Ganesh Asirvatham of Malaysia. The two qualified for the playoff by leading a field of 104 international experts after 24 rounds of a tournament held 9–12 November in Mumbai, India.

=== 2008 ===
Richards won the USA National Scrabble Championship and earned US$25,000 by winning his last three games against the runner-up, 1998 champion Brian Cappelletto, for a record of 22 wins and 6 losses, with a cumulative spread of 1,340 points.

=== 2009 ===
Richards was the runner-up in the USA National Scrabble Championship in Dayton, Ohio, losing to Dave Wiegand but still winning 25 of the 31 matches.

=== 2010 ===
Richards won the USA National Scrabble Championship in Dallas, Texas, again winning 25 games. His performance in this tournament was so dominant that he clinched the title before the last day of competition began.

=== 2011 ===
He repeated his success in the World Scrabble Championship in Warsaw, Poland, winning a closely fought final against Australia's top player, Andrew Fisher.

Richards won the USA National Scrabble Championship in Dallas, Texas, winning 22 games, including his final two, to hold off a number of challengers.

=== 2012 ===
Richards won the USA National Scrabble Championship, in Orlando, Florida, winning 22 of 31 games. To win the title, Richards had to defeat past champion David Gibson by at least 170 points in the final game; he won it by 177 points. At the time of the victory, Richards became the only person to have won the event four times, as well as the only player to have won it in three consecutive years.

=== 2013 ===
Richards won 24 of 31 games to finish first at the National Scrabble Championship in Las Vegas, Nevada, in July. The championship was not decided until the last game. Though he lost the game to Komol Panyasophonlert, Richards kept the score close enough to retain the title for a record fourth consecutive time (and record fifth overall).

He became World Champion for a third time, beating Panyasophonlert in the final; as of 2013, the World Championship has been renamed the Scrabble Champions Tournament and will be held annually.

=== 2015 ===
On 20 July, Richards won the nonduplicate portion of the 2015 French World Scrabble Championship in Belgium after two months of studying the French lexicon. He does not speak French. He won 14 of the preliminary 17 games before defeating the 2014 runner-up Schélick Ilagou Rekawe in the final, two games to one. In the duplicate (rarely played in English, but played in French since 1972) he finished second, just one point behind the winner, Switzerland's David Bovet.

=== 2017 ===
Richards competed in the World Championship and became the first seed after the regular 30 games, but lost in the quarterfinal to the 8th seed David Eldar, who won the tournament.

Richards won the 2017 WGPO Word Cup.

=== 2018 ===
Richards won his fourth World Championship. He also competed in the NASPA Championship, losing to Joel Sherman in the final round. He competed in the French Championship and won his second Classique Championship and his second Elite Duplicate (without conceding a single point), Blitz Duplicate and Pairs titles.

Richards placed 2nd at the 4th Niagara Falls International Open.

=== 2019 ===
Richards won his fifth World Championship and third Pairs title. He also won the WESPA championship, making it (unofficially) a sixth World Championship.

=== Since 2020 ===
Richards won the ASCI 2023 Masters.

Around 2023, he began studying the Spanish Scrabble word list and in 2024 competed in the Spanish World Scrabble Championship for the first time. Despite not speaking Spanish, he finished 2nd in the Duplicate format, while compiling the first two perfect scores ever recorded at the championship, and won 23 of 24 games to win the Classic format championship.

== Career achievements ==
=== World Championship ===
No.	Year	Stage	Opponent	Result
1	1999	Preliminaries	–	–
2	2005	Preliminaries	–	–
3	2007	Finals	(Malaysia) Ganesh Asirvatham	3–0 (1)
4	2009	Finals	(Thailand) Pakorn Nemitrmansuk	1–3
5	2011	Finals	(Australia) Andrew Fisher	3–2 (2)
6	2013	Finals	(Thailand) Komol Panyasophonlert	3–2 (3)
7	2014	Preliminaries	–	–
8	2015	Preliminaries	–	–
9	2016	Preliminaries	–	–
10	2017	Quarter-finals	(Australia) David Eldar	0–2
11	2018	Finals	(United States) Jesse Day	3–1 (4)
12	2019	Finals	(Australia) David Eldar	3–1 (5)
13	2025	Finals	(Canada) Adam Logan	2-4

=== U.S. National Scrabble Championship ===
No.	Year	Result	Runner-up
1	2002	2nd (1)	–
2	2004	3rd (1)	–
3	2005	7th	–
4	2008	Won (1)	(United States) Brian Cappelletto
5	2009	2nd (2)	–
6	2010	Won (2)	(United States) Brian Cappelletto
7	2011	Won (3)	(United States) Kenji Matsumoto
8	2012	Won (4)	(United States) David Gibson
9	2013	Won (5)	(Thailand) Komol Panyasophonlert
10	2014	16th	–
11	2017	3rd (2)	–
12	2018	2nd (3)	–
13	2025	3rd (3)	–

=== French Scrabble ===
No.	Year	Format	Opponent	Result
1	2015	Classique	(Gabon) Schelick Ilagou Rekawe	2–1 (1)
2	2017	Blitz Duplicate	–	Won (1)
3	2017	Elite Duplicate	–	Won (1)
4	2017	Pairs	–	Won with (France) Hervé Bohbot (1)
5	2018	Classique	(Ivory Coast) Gueu Mathieu Zingbe	2–1 (2)
6	2018	Blitz Duplicate	–	Won (2)
7	2018	Elite Duplicate	–	Won (2)
8	2018	Pairs	–	Won with (France) Hervé Bohbot (2)
9	2019	Blitz Duplicate	–	Won (3)
10	2019	Elite Duplicate	–	Won (3)
11	2019	Pairs	–	Won with (France) Hervé Bohbot (3)
12	2025	Blitz Duplicate	-	Won (4)
13	2025	Pairs	-	Won with (France) Hervé Bohbot (4)
14	2025	Elite Duplicate	-	Won (4)

=== Spanish Scrabble ===
No.	Year	Format	Result
1	2024	Duplicado	2nd
2	2024	Clásico	Won
3	2025	Duplicado	Won
2	2025	Clásico	5th

=== Other achievements ===
- Fifteen-time Thailand International (King's Cup) winner (1999, twice in 2000, 2001, 2002, 2004, 2006, 2007, 2011, 2013, 2014, 2015, 2016, 2018, 2019)
- Three-time Thailand International (King's Cup) second (1999, 2005, 2008)
- Twelve-time Singapore Open Scrabble Championship winner (2000, 2001, 2002, 2003, 2004, 2007, 2008, 2009, 2010, 2012, 2014, 2016)
- Ten-time UK Open winner (2008, 2010, 2011, 2012, 2013, 2014, 2016, 2017, 2018, 2019)
