= Scrabble Association of Uganda =

National regulatory body of Scrabble

- Sport: Scrabble
- Jurisdiction: National
- Founded: June 2001
- President: Nelson Kyagera Woire
- (Uganda)

Scrabble Association of Uganda (SAU) is the national regulatory body for the game of Scrabble in Uganda. It is registered with the National Council of Sports (NCS) of Uganda and it is affiliated to the World English‑Language Scrabble Players Association (WESPA), the Pan African Scrabble Association (PANASA) and the East and Central Africa Scrabble Association (ECASA).

== History ==
The formation of the Scrabble Association of Uganda (SAU) was preceded by organizing the efforts to establish the Scrabble Association of Uganda (SAU) which began in April 2001 when a group of Scrabble players gathered at the Subway restaurant in Crested Towers, Kampala, after being mobilized (in part via an advert in the letters pages of the Daily Monitor) by Henry Lubega.

At that meeting, a leadership committee was established to launch a national Scrabble association and in June 2001, the Scrabble Association of Uganda (SAU) was officially formed and it is registered with the National Council of Sports in Uganda.

== Governance ==
In 2001, Henry Lubega was elected as the Chairman of the Scrabble Association of Uganda (SAU), and he served until 2003. In 2003, Chris Ntege was elected as the chairman and led the association until 2008. In 2008, Chrisostom Kalibbala took over as chairman and served until 2014. In 2014, John Ssempebwa was elected and led the association until 2015. In 2015, Mark Okwir was elected as the Chairman of the Scrabble Association of Uganda before being succeeded by Nelson Kyagera Woire.

== Activities ==
The Scrabble Association of Uganda (SAU) actively promotes Scrabble through school and university programs, nurturing youth talent and enhancing critical thinking. It organizes national and regional tournaments to identify top players and strengthen competitive play. SAU also forms national teams to represent Uganda in regional and international championships, affiliating with bodies like WESPA and PANASA.
