= Pakorn =

Pakorn (Thai: ปกรณ์) is a Thai masculine given name. Notable people with the name include:

- Pakorn Chatborirak (born 1984), Thai actor and model
- Pakorn Lam (born 1979), Thai singer and actor
- Pakorn P.K. Saenchai Muaythaigym (born 1990), Thai Muay Thai fighter
- Pakorn Nemitrmansuk (born 1975), Thai Scrabble player
- Pakorn Prempak (born 1993), Thai footballer
