= Scrabble Champions Tournament 2014 =

World Scrabble Championship 2014
- 22 November 2014 – 24 November 2014
- Winner: Craig Beevers
- Number of players: 108
- Location: ExCeL London Exhibition and Convention Centre, London
- Sponsor: Mattel

The World Scrabble Championship 2014, renamed by Mattel to Scrabble Champions Tournament in 2013, was held at the ExCeL London Exhibition and Convention Centre, London in November 2014. It was the first time that the World Championship had become an open event when MSI invited all players to compete. However, due to the high entry fee and high venue cost, only 108 players entered and the prize money had to be limited.

== Results ==
The winner was Craig Beevers of Guisborough, Middlesbrough, England who defeated Chris Lipe of Clinton, New York, United States three games to one in the best-of-five finals.

In a close first game, Craig had bingos MANHOLE and UNRINSED while Chris had lYRICIST and SINTERED but missed best play chances and Beevers won 403 - 389.

In the second game, Chris opened with bingo BuNGLES, ASTROID and TAENIOID while Craig had BLOKARTS, OpERATIC and CHEQUERS. Craig also had a 69-point ZETA to take the game 524 - 419.

In the third game, Chris had five bingos JOLLIES, GUENONs, FELONIES, LIMBATE and BiVALENT while Craig had SHEDDERS and tried to pull back with an 89-point UPTRAIN but it wasn't enough and Chris won 509 - 464.

In the final game, Craig had bingos VENTROUS, GAIETIEs, DIORItE while Chris had DIRECTER and a 60-point XENIC but Craig sealed the win with a 42-point TALAQ to take the game 438 - 414 and the title of World Champion.

Beevers, whose prize was £3,000, has been playing for 12 years and was the 2009 UK champion. Third and fourth were Dave Wiegand and Adam Logan respectively.

The weekend following the championship there was a consolation tournament which was won by 2013 champion Nigel Richards.
