= National Scrabble Championship (UK) =

British national Scrabble tournament

The UK National Scrabble Championship (NSC) is a British national Scrabble tournament, held annually since its inception in 1971 (except 1995, 2020, and 2021). While it was formerly organised by Mattel, the copyright owner of Scrabble in the UK, since 2014 it has been organised by Association of British Scrabble Players (ABSP). It is one of five major Scrabble tournaments in the UK. The other four comprise the UK Open, the British Isles Elimination Scrabble Tournament (BEST), the British Matchplay Scrabble Championship (BMSC) and the UK Masters. The current UK champion is Harshan Lamabadusuriya.

== History ==
In 1971, author and broadcaster Gyles Brandreth visited Bristol Prison whilst conducting research for a book and noticed the inmates playing Scrabble; at around the same time, he also saw the Royal Family playing the game in a British TV documentary. He placed a small ad in The Times inviting anyone interested in taking part in a National Scrabble Championship to contact him. Hundreds replied, and after he contacted the game's owners at the time, J. W. Spear & Sons, the Championships were born.

Stephen Haskell won the Championships in 1971 with an aggregate of 1345 points from 3 games. Regional qualifying events were introduced in 1976. The Championships continued to be decided by the three-game cumulative score method until 1988. In 1989, a hybrid format was introduced, in which the winner had to win all of his/her four games with the highest score possible. From 1990, the Championships have been exclusively 'play to win' format with no relation to points totals.

The format has changed several times over the years. It has regional qualifying competitions. A Scrabble tournament is split into at least two divisions based on players' ratings, and placings are determined by the number of wins, then by accumulated point differences (called the spread). In each one-day local tournament designated as an NSC qualifier, players who finish in the top 25% in the top division qualify, with decimals rounded to the nearest integer. For example, if there are 18 players, the top 5 will qualify (since 25% of 18 is 4.5, with the figure rounded up). In the second-highest division, the top 10% qualify. Additionally, extra qualification places are allocated for players rated 170 or above. [1]

Until 2013, qualifiers competed in a semi-final held in another part of the UK, involving 60 qualifiers from six NSC qualifiers competing in a 14-game stage, with the top two playing in a best-of-five final held in London. Since the ABSP replaced Mattel as the sponsor of the NSC in 2014, qualifiers now compete in a 17-game final held over a weekend in November, with no best-of-5 final. The final, like a normal Scrabble tournament, orders players based on number of wins, followed by number of spread points. The player who finishes first after 17 games is crowned the UK National Scrabble Champion and wins a cash prize of £1,000. Smaller cash prizes are also awarded to the top 10 players, plus a ratings prize for the player who improves their ABSP rating higher than all other players. In 2018, the finals were held in London.

The highest score under the cumulative score method was 1863 in three games by Nigel Ingham from Nottingham in 1987. The youngest champion was 15-year-old Allan Saldanha in 1993, and the oldest was 57-year-old Jake Jacobs in 2006, when the championship featured in the BBC Four and subsequently BBC Two program Marcus Brigstocke''s Trophy People. In 2012, Paul Gallen became the first player from Northern Ireland to win the title.

== Winners of UK National Scrabble Championship ==
- 1971: Stephen Haskell
- 1972: Olive Behan
- 1973: Anne Bradford
- 1974: Richard Sharp
- 1975: Olive Behan (2)
- 1976: Alan Richter
- 1977: Mike Goldman
- 1978: Philip Nelkon
- 1979: Christine Jones
- 1980: Joyce Cansfield
- 1981: Philip Nelkon (2)
- 1982: Russell Byers
- 1983: Colin Gumbrell
- 1984: Mike Willis
- 1985: Esther Byers (now Perrins)
- 1986: Viraf Mehta
- 1987: Nigel Ingham
- 1988: Margaret Rogers
- 1989: Russell Byers (2)
- 1990: Philip Nelkon (3)
- 1991: Phil Appleby
- 1992: Philip Nelkon (4)
- 1993: Allan Saldanha
- 1994: Mike Willis (2)
- 1995: no tournament
- 1996: Andrew Fisher
- 1997: Andrew Cook
- 1998: Mark Nyman
- 1999: Evan Simpson
- 2000: Brett Smitheram
- 2001: Mark Nyman (2)
- 2002: Mark Nyman (3)
- 2003: Harshan Lamabadusuriya
- 2004: Mark Nyman (4)
- 2005: Wale Fashina
- 2006: Jake Jacobs
- 2007: Paul Allan
- 2008: Allan Simmons
- 2009: Craig Beevers
- 2010: Mikki Nicholson
- 2011: Wayne Kelly
- 2012: Paul Gallen
- 2013: Paul Allan (2)
- 2014: Chris May
- 2015: Craig Beevers (2)
- 2016: Phil Robertshaw
- 2017: Austin Shin
- 2018: Edward Martin
- 2019: Phil Robertshaw (2)
- 2020: No tournament
- 2021: No tournament
- 2022: Brett Smitheram (2)
- 2023: Paul Allan (3)
- 2024: Paul Gallen (2)
- 2025: Harshan Lamabadusuriya (2)

Numbers in parentheses are the total numbers of championships won by that player, up to and including that year.
