= World Scrabble Championship 2017 =

- 22 August 2017 – 27 August 2017
- Winner: David Eldar
- Number of players: 77
- Location: Nottinghamshire, England

The MSI World Scrabble Championship 2017 was a Scrabble tournament organised by Mattel and Mindsports International (MSI) to determine the world champion in English Scrabble. It was held from 22 to 27 August in Nottinghamshire, England.

The event was split into two divisions according to players' World English-Language Scrabble Players' Association (WESPA) ratings; the top division comprised some 77 players. 35 games were played on the first four days, after which the top eight proceeded to a 3-game quarterfinals, with the winners advancing to a 5-game semifinals on the same day; the top two players, David Eldar and Harshan Lamabadusuriya, played a best-of-five final the day after for the top prize of €7,000. Eldar beat Lamabadusuriya 3–0.

== Background ==
The World Scrabble Championship 2017 was originally slated to take place at the Doha Exhibition and Convention Center in Qatar, as part of the 4th Mindsports World Championship (comprising chess, go, e-sports, and Scrabble events) organised by the Mindsports Academy (MSA). However, due to the 2017 Qatar diplomatic crisis, the championship was relocated to Nottingham Trent University in Nottingham, Nottinghamshire, England, and held from 22 to 27 August under the auspices of Mindsports International (the parent organisation of MSA) and sponsored by Mattel, the Qatar Tourism Authority, SamTimer, and the World Mind Sport Federation. MSA also hosted a Junior World Scrabble Championship for players under 21 at the same venue from 19 to 21 August.

== Results ==
=== Preliminary ===
After 35 preliminary rounds, the top eight, which included three-time World Champion Nigel Richards (2007, 2011, and 2013) and 1993 champion Mark Nyman, advanced to the quarterfinals. 2016 champion Brett Smitheram finished in fourteenth place, thus failing in his title defence.

| Position | Name | Number of wins | Cumulative spread |
|---|---|---|---|
| 1 | Nigel Richards | 26.5 | +1893 |
| 2 | Austin Shin | 24.5 | +757 |
| 3 | Harshan Lamabadusuriya | 23 | +1185 |
| 4 | Neil Scott | 22.5 | +1244 |
| 5 | Goutham Jayaraman | 22 | +1549 |
| 6 | Mark Nyman | 22 | +817 |
| 7 | Elie Dangoor | 22 | +519 |
| 8 | David Eldar | 21 | +1675 |
| 9 | Paul Gallen | 21 | +1202 |
| 10 | David Webb | 21 | +888 |
| 11 | David Koenig | 21 | +811 |
| 12 | Neil Rowley | 21 | +806 |
| 13 | Waseem Khatri | 21 | +580 |
| 14 | Brett Smitheram | 20 | +1059 |
| 15 | Joel Wapnick | 20 | +888 |
| 16 | Vincent Boyle | 20 | +830 |
| 17 | Chris Cummins | 20 | +638 |
| 18 | Paul Allan | 20 | +402 |
| 19 | Calum Edwards | 20 | +384 |
| 20 | Alex Tan | 20 | −788 |

=== Knockout ===
Quarterfinals (best of 3)
1 | Nigel Richards | 0
8 | David Eldar | 2
4 | Goutham Jayaraman | 2
5 | Neil Scott | 0
2 | Mark Nyman | 0
7 | Harshan Lamabadusuriya | 2
3 | Elie Dangoor | 0
6 | Austin Shin | 2

Semifinals (best of 5)
David Eldar | 3
Goutham Jayaraman | 2
Austin Shin | 2
Harshan Lamabadusuriya | 3

Final (best of 5)
David Eldar | 3
Harshan Lamabadusuriya | 0

=== Finals ===
| David Eldar (AUS) | Harshan Lamabadusuriya (LKA) |
| 3 | 0 |
| Born 1989; 27 years old | Born ??? 44 years old |
| Finalist | Finalist |
| WESPA Rating: 2203 (World No. 2) | WESPA Rating: 2087 (World No. 15) |

| Round | David Eldar | Harshan Lamabadusuriya |
|---|---|---|
| 1 | 468 | 426 |
| 2 | 575 | 384 |
| 3 | 450 | 420 |
| 4 | – | – |
| 5 | – | – |

UK-based poker player and real estate agent David Eldar, who was born in Australia, UK based Sri Lankan doctor Harshan Lamabadusuriya in the best-of-five finals; Eldar was awarded £7000 for becoming 2017 World Scrabble Champion, whereas runner-up Lamabadusuriya netted £3000. Notable plays by Eldar included CARRELS for 74 points, ASINICOS (idiots; 64), and OBVS (slang for obvious; 10). Austin Shin beat Goutham Jayaraman 2–1 in a best-of-three third-place playoff.
