= Singapore Open Scrabble Championship =

International Scrabble tournament est. 1998

Tournament information
- Sport: Scrabble
- Location: Singapore
- Established: 1998
- Format: 15–17 rounds

Current champion
- Toh Weibin

The Singapore Open Scrabble Championship is an international Scrabble tournament held each year in Singapore, established in 1998. The field of players is considerably large and it is not an invitational event. World Scrabble champion Nigel Richards has the most Singapore Open wins, with twelve between 2000 and 2017.

== Champions ==
The winner of the championship's inaugural edition was Michael Tang in 1998. The player with the most Singapore Open victories is New Zealander Nigel Richards, who won eleven times between 2000 and 2014, and once again in 2016. No other person has won the tournament more than once. The Singapore Open was cancelled in 2013 and 2015 due to a lack of venue.

| Year | Champion | Country | Venue | Wins/Total number of games | Cumulative spread | Runner(s)-up |
|---|---|---|---|---|---|---|
| 2017 | Toh Weibin | Singapore | YWCA Fort Canning Lodge | 14/16 | 1156 | (New Zealand) Nigel Richards |
| 2016 | Nigel Richards (12) | New Zealand | Hwa Chong Institution | 11/16 | 1071 | (Singapore) Hubert Wee |
| 2014 | Nigel Richards (11) | New Zealand | *SCAPE | 12/16 | 1272 | (Australia) Alastair Richards |
| 2012 | Nigel Richards (10) | New Zealand | West Coast Community Club | 14/16 | 1840 | (Malaysia) Aaron Chong |
| 2011 | Aaron Chong | Malaysia | Thomson Community Club | 11/16 | 1246 | (Singapore) Hubert Wee |
| 2010 | Nigel Richards (9) | New Zealand | Thomson Community Club | 14/17 | 2190 | (Singapore) Cheah Siu Hean |
| 2009 | Nigel Richards (8) | New Zealand | Sengkang Community Club | 12/16 | 978 | (Singapore) Hubert Wee |
| 2008 | Nigel Richards (7) | New Zealand | Anchorvale Community Club | 14/16 | 1196 | (Singapore) Hubert Wee |
| 2007 | Nigel Richards (6) | New Zealand | Teck Ghee Community Club | 11/16 | 833 | (Singapore) Shim Yen Nee |
| 2006 | Tony Sim | Singapore | Teck Ghee Community Club | 12/16 | 670 | (Philippines) Marlon Prudencio |
| 2005 | Andy Kurnia | Singapore | Teck Ghee Community Club | 12/16 | 749 | (Singapore) Hubert Wee |
| 2004 | Nigel Richards (5) | New Zealand | Nanyang Community Club | 12/16 | 962 | (Singapore) Cheah Siu Hean |
| 2003 | Nigel Richards (4) | New Zealand | Jurong Green Community Club | 12.5/16 | 1181 | (Singapore) Ricky Purnomo |
| 2002 | Nigel Richards (3) | New Zealand | Jurong Green Community Club | 12/16 | 782 | (Singapore) Tony Sim |
| 2001 | Nigel Richards (2) | New Zealand | Hong Kah East Community Club | 12/16 | 1021 | (Singapore) Quek Sim Ho |
| 2000 | Nigel Richards (1) | New Zealand | Hong Kah East Community Club | 14/16 | 2118 | (Nigeria) Femi Awowade |
| 1999 | Ganesh Asirvatham | Malaysia | Hong Kah East Community Club | 12/15 | 1053 | (Malaysia) Tengku Asri |
| 1998 | Michael Tang | Singapore | Hong Kah East Community Club | 12/16 | 472 | (Philippines) Ador Ruiz |
