= World Scrabble Championship 2009 =

- 26 November 2009 – 29 November 2009
- Winner: Pakorn Nemitrmansuk
- Number of players: 108
- Location: Johor Bahru
- Sponsor: Mattel

The World Scrabble Championship 2009 was held in the Zon Regency Hotel, Johor Bahru, Malaysia, between November 26 to November 29. The tournament format was 24 rounds for all players, followed by best-of-five finals between the top two players. There were 116 places allocated to competitors from around the world, with 108 players eventually competing.

== Results ==
The winner was Pakorn Nemitrmansuk of Thailand who defeated the reigning champion Nigel Richards of New Zealand with three games to one in the best-of-five finals. The two finalists earned their spots by each winning 18 games in the first 24 rounds. Dave Wiegand of United States won 17 games and placed third.

Pakorn set two additional WSC records at this event, by winning 14 consecutive games in the preliminaries and by scoring 670 points in a final game, which included a triple-triple of the word PALUDINE scoring 167 points.

The first game was close, Pakorn winning 425–419. Bingos from Pakorn included HOMEWARE, DELEtING and DRENCHING. Bingos from Nigel were STAMINAS and REDEPLOY.

The second game was a record 670–303 win for Pakorn, during which he had a personal best 5:04 remaining on the clock. Pakorn started with the bingo UNRuLES and continued with OORIEST, EBRIATE and the triple-triple PALUDINE. He also had luck with the Z and Q. Nigel chipped in with bingo REAcTOR.

Nigel pulled one back in the third game, 443–394. He had two bingos JINKERS and LICHTED compared to Pakorn's three: REpTANT, STAINED and RAMPAUGE, but Nigel scored more with his (100+ per bingo).

The fourth game saw Pakorn take the title of World Champion at last, after two runner-up positions, in a high scoring and close game 499–480. It was a bingo-bingo start, with Pakorn getting ADVENES and Nigel GRIFTERS. Nigel had a further FrEEHOLD and BOHEMIAN. Pakorn followed up with GENETRIX on the triple and a game winning BOTANICA and BOWATS.

== Complete Results ==
Position	Name	Country	Win–loss	Spread	Prize (USD)
1	Nemitrmansuk, Pakorn	Thailand	18–6	+1388	15,000
2	Richards, Nigel	World Champion	18–6	+1854	6,000
3	Wiegand, David	United States	17–7	+895	3,000
4	Siriwangso, Marut	Thailand	16–8	+1207	2,000
5	Panyasophonlert, Komol	Thailand	16–8	+1095	1,000
6	Boys, David	Canada	16–8	+876	900
7	Fernando, Naween Tharanga	Australia	16–8	+842	800
8	Beevers, Craig	England	16–8	+777	700
9	Wapnick, Joel	Canada	15½–8½	+748	600
10	Gipson, Helen	Scotland	15–9	+883	500
11	Wellington Jighere	Nigeria	15–9	+658	
12	Benedict, Nathan	United States	15–9	+634	
13	Rodrigues, Sherwin	India	15–9	+624	
14	Katz-Brown, Jason	United States	15–9	+608	
15	Fisher, Andrew	Australia	15–9	+533	
16	Ikekeregor, Dennis	Nigeria	15–9	+301	
17	Kennedy, Rik	Northern Ireland	15–9	-68	
18	Nicholson, Mikki	England	14–10	+880	
19	Nyman, Mark	England	14–10	+620	
20	Mackay, Lewis	England	14–10	+585	
21	Thevenot, Geoff	United States	14–10	+561	
22	Kramer, Jim	United States	14–10	+473	
23	Bowman, Brian	United States	14–10	+441	
24	Saidu, Ayorinde	Nigeria	14–10	+398	
25	Sujjayakorn, Panupol	Thailand	14–10	+364	
26	Scott, Neil	Scotland	14–10	+200	
27	Ball, Nick	United States	14–10	+160	
28	Okulicz, Edward	Australia	14–10	+33	
29	Kenas, Mark	United States	14–10	+8	
30	Brousson, Theresa	Malta	13½–10½	+188	
31	Limprasert, Pichai	Thailand	13½–10½	+72	
32	O'Laughlin, John	United States	13–11	+783	
33	Robertshaw, Phil	England	13–11	+644	
34	Lamabadusuriya, Harshan	England	13–11	+476	
35	Grant, Jeff	New Zealand	13–11	+383	
36	Placca, Chrys	Ghana	13–11	+376	
37	Leah, Tony	Canada	13–11	+361	
38	Schellenberg, Mark	Canada	13–11	+191	
39	Rosin, Sam	United States	13–11	+167	
40	Wee, Ming Hui Hubert	Singapore	13–11	+127	
41	Litunya, Patrick	Kenya	13–11	+73	
42	Appleby, Phil	England	13–11	-37	
43	Cheah, Siu Hean	Singapore	13–11	-38	
44	Khatri, Waseem	Pakistan	13–11	-53	
45	Harrison, Martin	England	13–11	-431	
46	David Eldar	Australia	12½–11½	+315	
47	Warner, Howard	New Zealand	12½–11½	+191	
48	Bhandarkar, Akshay	United Arab Emirates	12–12	+783	
49	Green, Neil	Wales	12–12	+551	
50	Gongolo, Michael	Kenya	12–12	+384	
51	Allan, Paul	England	12–12	+291	
52	Balasingam, Vannitha	Malaysia	12–12	+268	
53	Wanniarachchi, Lakshan	Sri Lanka	12–12	+210	
54	Panitch, Max	Canada	12–12	+170	
55	Mwangi, Willy	Kenya	12–12	+93	
56	Sukhumrattanaporn, Charnwit	Thailand	12–12	+51	
57	Halsall, Trevor	Australia	12–12	+22	
58	Early, Dylan	South Africa	12–12	-54	
59	Tamas, Adrian	Romania	12–12	-86	
60	Akonor, Michael	Ghana	12–12	-169	
61	Siddiqui, Irfan	Bahrain	12–12	-171	
62	Simmons, Allan	Scotland	12–12	-473	
63	Amalean, Shaila	Sri Lanka	11½–12½	+170	
64	Purnomo, Ricky	Singapore	11½–12½	-237	
65	McMahon, Kevin	Ireland	11–13	+626	
66	Hoekstra, Ron	Canada	11–13	+377	
67	Hovelmeier, Trevor Mark	South Africa	11–13	+207	
68	Okwelogu, Chinedu Nosike	Nigeria	11–13	+36	
69	Kougi, Peter	Australia	11–13	-148	
70	Yeo, Kien Hung	Malaysia	11–13	-262	
71	Prudencio, Marlon	Singapore	11–13	-282	
72	Delicata, David	Malta	11–13	-366	
73	Golding, Andrew	Canada	11–13	-445	
74	Gabriel, Marty	United States	11–13	-446	
75	Thorogood, Blue	New Zealand	11–13	-509	
76	Parchamento, Roger	Philippines	11–13	-617	
77	Pantis, Mihai	Romania	11–13	-667	
78	Linn, Robert	United States	11–13	-740	
79	Khan, Rashid Ateeq	Pakistan	11–13	-830	
80	Ikawa, Victor	Bahrain	11–13	-836	
81	Oyende, Allan	Kenya	10–14	+307	
82	Buddhdev, Anand	Netherlands	10–14	-206	
83	Charles, Leslie	Trinidad and Tobago	10–14	-276	
84	Saldanha, Dielle	Canada	10–14	-371	
85	Bohbot, Herve	France	10–14	-404	
86	Kantimathi, Sam	United States	10–14	-419	
87	Craig, Joanne	New Zealand	10–14	-440	
88	Abordo, Chris	Philippines	10–14	-451	
89	Anthonius, Ferdy	Indonesia	10–14	-637	
90	Kang, William	Malaysia	10–14	-951	
91	Roddis, Marc	Sweden	10–14	-1506	
92	Mpundu, Patrick Mulemena	Zambia	9½–14½	-215	
93	Khongthanarat, Charnrit	World Youth Champion	9½–14½	-435	
94	Idalski, Jason	United States	9½–14½	-544	
95	Judd, Rodney	Pakistan	9½–14½	-557	
96	McDonald, Abigail	Guyana	9½–14½	-1640	
97	Lobo, Ralph	United Arab Emirates	9–15	-54	
98	Ong, Suanne	Malaysia	9–15	-63	
99	Tang, Michael	Malaysia	9–15	-489	
100	Quao, Michael Arthur	Ghana	8–16	-304	
101	Edwin-Mugisha, Phillip	Uganda	8–16	-385	
102	Esmail, Mushtak	Tanzania	8–16	-829	
103	Gonzalez, Ricardo V	Saudi Arabia	8–16	-964	
104	Tanveer, Rohaina	Kuwait	7–17	-1006	
105	Pieta, Bartosz	Poland	7–17	-1233	
106	Geamsakul, Warodom	Japan	7–17	-1611	
107	Fernandes, Cecil	Oman	5–19	-1384	
108	Gomes, Anthony	Qatar	4–20	-2200	

- FINALS:
- Game 1: Pakorn 425 – Nigel 419
- Game 2: Pakorn 670 – Nigel 303
- Game 3: Nigel 443 – Pakorn 394
- Game 4: Pakorn 499 – Nigel 480
