= World Scrabble Championship 2025 =

- 11 November 2025 – 16 November 2025
- Winner: Adam Logan
- Number of players: 129
- Location: Accra, Ghana
- Sponsor: WESPA

The WESPA World Scrabble Championship 2025 (WESPAC) was organised by WESPA and held in Accra, Ghana from November 11 to 16. The best-of-7 final was between Nigel Richards and Adam Logan.

== Results ==
=== Finals ===
The winner was Adam Logan.

In the first game, Nigel had bingo PUNCTUAL while Adam had HAEMATINS and TOILERS. Adam won 450–375.

In the second game, Nigel had bingos JEEPING, SALTATE, FACTISES and TUBEROID while Adam had LEGATION and DRIVELED. Nigel won 510–440.

In a phenomenal third game, Nigel had bingos TANNAGES and a 92-point ANTHESES. After Nigel played QIN, Adam played a 103-point INFAMIES with four hooks, two on QIN and two on WITH, starting an unlikely comeback. Nigel then played bingo TRIBALLY, opening a triple-triple. Adam then played the 149-point DIOPTERS over the triple-triple to surge into the lead. At the very end, Adam played an inspired RAJA to block Nigel's game-winning bingo to win 515–499 for a total of over 1000 points to complete one of the best comebacks ever seen in a World Championship final.

In the fourth game, Adam played bingo INERTIA after Nigel sensationally misplaced SHERIAT for a phony that he had to remove for zero points. Adam missed a high point HM hook. Nigel then had bingos THAWIER, INFORCES, TARLATAN while Adam had DAMPERS. Nigel won 509–436 to level the game score 2–2.

In the fifth game where Adam was consonant heavy and Nigel vowel heavy, Nigel had bingos RELOOKED, ETESIAN while Adam had ARMOIRE and FRONTES and an 88-point JAMS. Adam won 467–448.

In the sixth game Nigel had bingos EIRENIC while Adam had TEWARTS and REPAVING. Adam won 455–379 to win the championship by 4 games to 2.
