= Wellington Jighere =

Nigerian Scrabble player (born c.1982)

- Born: c. 1982 (age 43–44); Olomu, Delta State, Nigeria
- Other name: "The Cat in the Hat"
- Occupation: Scrabble player
- Years active: 2002–present
- Known for: Scrabble World Champion (2015)

Wellington Jighere (born c. 1982) is a Nigerian Scrabble player. He won the World Scrabble Championship 2015, the first win for an African nation. He defeated Lewis MacKay in four straight wins.

Jighere is nicknamed "The Cat in the Hat" for his quiet personality and fondness for hats.

== Career ==
Jighere was born c. 1982, and he grew up in Olomu, the origin point of Scrabble's rise in Nigeria beginning in the 1970s. He first played using a cardboard version of the game his brother created. As a teenager, his skill earned him a scholarship. He began playing Scrabble tournaments in 2002, after winning games versus friends in the tournament scene. He participated in the 2007 and 2009 World Scrabble Championships, placing seventh and eleventh, respectively.

Though afflicted with jet lag during the Scrabble World Championship 2015, he won, achieving the first win for both a Nigerian and an African. For his win, he received a congratulatory phone call from president Muhammadu Buhari. He then created and sold the Wellyboard, his version of the Scrabble board. He also received a sponsorship from Canon Inc.

Jighere intended to appear in the World Scrabble Championship 2016, but the French government denied his passport, along with every other member of the Nigerian Scrabble team. Despite this, he continued making his living off Scrabble tournament prize money. He planned to appear at the Scrabble event, at the Nigerian National Sports Festival in March 2020, but the COVID-19 pandemic in Nigeria caused the competition to be postponed indefinitely. He was unable to find a different job due to the unemployment caused by the pandemic. In December 2020, Jighere announced his retirement from tournament Scrabble due to the pandemic. He unretired in February 2021, appearing at the Nigerian National Sports Festival.

== Achievements ==
- World Scrabble Championships

- 2007 – 3rd place
- 2009 – 11th place
- 2015 – winner
- 2017 – 4th place
- 2023 – 4th place

- North American Scrabble Players Championship

- 2023 32nd National Championship Finals (CSW) – winner

- African Scrabble Championship / Pan African Championship

- 2006 – 7th place
- 2008 – winner
- 2010 – winner
- 2014 – 20th place
- 2016 – 11th place
- 2022 – 2nd place

- West African Scrabble Championship

- 2022 – 3rd place

- Nigerian National Scrabble Tournament

- 2019 – winner

- Asaf Zadok Nigerian National Championship

- 2017 – 14th place

- MGI (Mind Games Incorporated) Scrabble Grand Slam

- 2022 – winner

- Scrabble In The Jungle Nigeria

- 2022 – winner

- Lekki Scrabble classic championship

- 2023 – 2nd place

- Wellington Classics, Nigeria

- 2017 – winner
