= Panupol Sujjayakorn =

Thai Scrabble player and economist (born 1985)

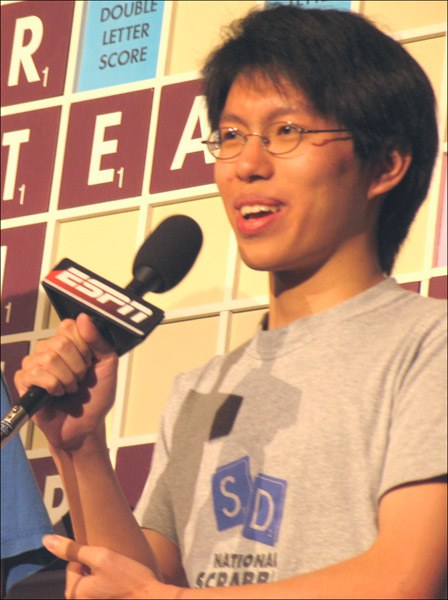
- Panupol Sujjayakorn in 2005
- Born: 1985 (age 40–41)
- Occupations: Scrabble player, economist

Panupol Sujjayakorn (Thai: ภาณุพล สัจยากร; RTGS: Phanuphon Satchayakon; born 1985) is a Thai Scrabble player, an economics graduate at Chulalongkorn University and manager at ExxonMobil. He won the Thailand Matchplay Championship 2002, World Scrabble Championship 2003, Thailand King's Cup 2005 and was runner-up in the American National Scrabble Championship 2005 to Dave Wiegand. He is known for his encyclopedic knowledge of words despite having only conversational English.

In the World Scrabble Championship 2003, Sujjayakorn won his first 8 games and 18 of his first 21 before losing the final three games to finish with 18 wins, 6 losses, first place. He then played fellow countryman Pakorn Nemitrmansuk in the best-of-five final. The final was tied at two wins each before Sujjayakorn won the final game 444–387 to be crowned World Scrabble champion in his first appearance at the tournament. In the 2005 National Scrabble Championship Sujjayakorn won his first 9 consecutive games and 14 of his first 15, but won just 7 of his final 13 games. He qualified in second place for the final where he played Dave Wiegand, and led 2–0 in the final before Wiegand won all of the final three games to win the tournament.

== Achievements ==
- 2002 Thailand Match Play Champion
- 2003 World Scrabble champion
- 2005 US Scrabble Open runner up
