= Spanish World Scrabble Championship =

Game competition

The Spanish World Scrabble Championship (Spanish: Campeonato del mundo de Scrabble en español) is an international Scrabble tournament organised by the Federación Internacional de Scrabble en Español (FISE). The competition takes place each year in a different city in a Spanish-speaking country. The first championship was held in Madrid in Spain. The number of players has varied, from 32 players in 1997 to 120 in 2018.

Players only play with two players at a board, never more, and the tournament uses a Swiss tournament system to decide who plays against whom. In 2007, the players played 18 games with the winner being Benjamín Olaizola of Venezuela with 14 wins from 18 games. Since then, the number of games has gradually increased, reaching 24 in 2016. Internationally, the players are rated by the Elo system.

== List of winners ==
Year	Host city	Winner	Nationality	Runner-up	Nationality
1997	(Spain) Madrid	Joan R. Manchado	Spain	Josep M. Martí	Spain
1998	Mexico City	Blai Figueras	Spain	Claudia Amaral	Argentina
1999	(Venezuela) Caracas	Amanda Gauna	Argentina	Joan R. Manchado	Spain
2000	(Chile) Santiago	Roberto Aguilar	Honduras	Miguel Rivera	Spain
2001	(Costa Rica) San José	Benjamín Olaizola	Venezuela	Carlos González	Venezuela
2002	(Argentina) Buenos Aires	Carlos González	Venezuela	Rocco Laguzzi	Argentina
2003	(Mexico) Xcaret	Joan R. Manchado	Spain	Carlos González	Venezuela
2004	Panama	Claudia Amaral	Argentina	Héctor Klíe	United States
2005	(Spain) L'Alfàs del Pi	Antonio Álvarez	Spain	Enric Hernández	Spain
2006	(Uruguay) Montevideo	Enric Hernández	Spain	Rocco Laguzzi	Argentina
2007	(Colombia) Bogotá	Benjamín Olaizola	Venezuela	Airán Pérez	Venezuela
2008	(Argentina) Buenos Aires	Enric Hernández	Spain	Airán Pérez	Venezuela
2009	(Venezuela) Isla Margarita	Luis Picciochi	Argentina	Claudia Amaral	Argentina
2010	(Costa Rica) San José	Luis Picciochi	Argentina	Blai Figueras	Spain
2011	Mexico City	Diego F. González	Argentina	Benjamín Olaizola	Venezuela
2012	(Spain) Santa Susanna	Rocco Laguzzi	Argentina	Benjamín Olaizola	Venezuela
2013	(Argentina) Buenos Aires	Airán Pérez	Venezuela	Enric Hernández	Spain
2014	(Cuba) Havana	Jesús Ortega	Mexico	Luis Acevedo	Argentina
2015	(Colombia) Cali	Airán Pérez	Venezuela	Enric Hernández	Spain
2016	(France) Lille	José Fernández	Spain	Luis Picciochi	Argentina
2017	(Paraguay) Asunción	Selene Delgado	Uruguay	Claudia Amaral	Argentina
2018	(Mexico) Playa del Carmen	Luis Picciochi	Argentina	Enric Hernández	Spain
2019	Panama City	Serge Emig	France	Jesús Ortega	Mexico
2022	(Argentina) Buenos Aires	Serge Emig	France	Horacio Moavro	Argentina
2023	(Costa Rica) San José	Benjamín Olaizola	Argentina	Rocco Laguzzi	Argentina
2024	(Spain) Granada	Nigel Richards	New Zealand	Benjamín Olaizola	Argentina

== Multiple winners ==
- (3) Benjamín Olaizola Venezuela Argentina: 2001, 2007, 2023
- (3) Luis Picciochi Argentina: 2009, 2010, 2018
- (2) Joan R. Manchado Spain : 1997, 2003
- (2) Enric Hernández Spain: 2006, 2008
- (2) Airán Pérez Venezuela: 2013, 2015
- (2) Serge Emig France: 2019, 2022

== Winners by country ==
- Argentina : 8 wins
- Spain : 7 wins
- Venezuela : 5 wins
- France : 2 wins
- Honduras : 1 win
- Mexico : 1 win
- New Zealand : 1 win
- Uruguay : 1 win
