= Pakorn Nemitrmansuk =

Thai Scrabble player (born 1975)

- Born: 1975 (age 50–51)
- Occupation: Scrabble player

Pakorn Nemitrmansuk (born 1975) is one of Thailand's top Scrabble players and the 2009 World Scrabble Champion. An architect and resident of Bangkok, Nemitrmansuk has competed at World Scrabble Championship six times between 1999 and 2011, and was the runner-up in 2003 and 2005.

At World Scrabble Championship 2009 in Malaysia in November 2009, Nemitrmansuk won 18 games in the first 24 rounds, earning him a spot in the best-of-five final against the reigning champion Nigel Richards, where Nemitrmansuk won the championship by three games to one.

== Achievements ==
- World Scrabble Championships
  - 1999 40th place
  - 2001 16th place
  - 2003 runner-up
  - 2005 runner-up
  - 2009 winner
  - 2011 3rd place
- Four time winner of the Brand's Crossword Game King's Cup
