= Scrabble Champions Tournament 2013 =

World Scrabble Championship 2013
- 3 December 2013 – 8 December 2013
- Winner: Nigel Richards
- Number of players: 110
- Location: Andel's Hotel, Prague, Czech Republic
- Sponsor: Mattel

The World Scrabble Championship 2013, renamed by Mattel to Scrabble Champions Tournament, was held in Andel's Hotel, Prague, Czech Republic during December 2013.

The format was a 31-round preliminary tournament and best-of-five semi-finals and final. After defeating Dave Wiegand and Sammy Okosagah in the semi-finals respectively, Nigel Richards and Komol Panyasophonlert played a best-of-five final for the top prize and the title of World Scrabble Champion 2013.

== Results ==
The winner was Nigel Richards of New Zealand who defeated Komol Panyasophonlert of Thailand with three games to two in the best-of-five finals. Richards set the record for being the first three-time World Champion, the only person to have won the title more than once.

In a lucky start with two blanks, Komol started with a 70-point bingo POONAcs. Nigel replied immediately with a 94-point bingo DIATONIC, to set the tone for a high standard final. Komol had further bingos DOULEIAS, EXALTERS and LIGHTENS while Nigel had TERRAPIN. Komol won the first game 495–445.

In the second game, Nigel saved his X to hook his own word JEU to make a 73-point EXACT with JEUX. Nigel had bingos OUTDARED and NOISIER. Komol tried to pull back a large lead with a 107-point phony HALVINGS on the triple, but it was successfully challenged and Nigel won the game 471–319.

In the third game, Komol set the pace with a 66-point QAT. Komol had bingos AEROGEL, SEITENS and ORDINAnT while Nigel clawed back with yARNERS and a 75-point JACKS on the triple word. It was not enough and Komol won 471–433.

In the fourth game, Komol's first play was PARTAKeN for 68 and Nigel immediately replied with ADNATiON for 82, not having had a chance to use his blank for a bingo in his first turn. Nigel had further bingos INCENTS and PILOTAGE, a 63-point QI and SHOJIS for 72 while Komol tried to come back with SUETIER but to no avail. Nigel won 518–410, to pull the score back to 2–2 with one game remaining to decide the title.

In the final game, Komol had a great start with GAZUMPED for 96 but Nigel responded with BEJEWeL for 89 and AUrOREAN across six hooks for 98 to take a 100+ lead. Komol had a vowel heavy rack of AEEIIIT and exchanged AEIII. Nigel had bingo OILSEED and a 60-point GREX while Komol eventually found bingo VIREMIAS after successive bad draws. Nigel sealed the win with RATOONER with a final score of 581–421, thus clinching the title of World Champion for the third time, the only person to have won it more than once.

== Top ten ==
| Position | Name | Country | Win–loss | Spread | Prize (USD) |
|---|---|---|---|---|---|
| 1 | Nigel Richards | New Zealand | 22–9 | +1498 | 10,000 |
| 2 | Komol Panyasophonlert | Thailand | 21–10 | +1215 | 5,000 |
| 3 | Dave Wiegand | United States | 22–9 | +791 | 2,500 |
| 4 | Sammy Okosagah | United States | 22–9 | +2052 | 2,500 |
| 5 | Craig Beevers | England | 20–11 | +983 | 1,200 |
| 6 | Jim Kramer | United States | 20–11 | +953 | 1,000 |
| 7 | Paul Gallen | Northern Ireland | 20–11 | +819 | 900 |
| 8 | Brett Smitheram | England | 20–11 | +725 | 800 |
| 9 | Sherwin Rodrigues | India | 19–12 | +1128 | 600 |
| 10 | Adam Logan | Canada | 19–12 | +994 | 500 |
