= Allan Simmons =

British scrabble expert (born 1957)

Allan Simmons (born 27 July 1957) is a British Scrabble expert who was one of the founder members of the Association of British Scrabble Players and succeeded Peter Finley as its chairman. He was the first chairman of the World English-language Scrabble Players Association. He was also the 2008 UK National Scrabble Champion.

In addition to playing top level Scrabble since the late-1970s, Simmons is also known as a prolific author of Scrabble books and publisher of Onwords magazine since 1979. Together with Darryl Francis he has produced every edition of Official Scrabble Words by Chambers and has more recently worked with HarperCollins on their official wordlist book. He also previously wrote a weekly Scrabble column for The Times, compiles a weekly Scrabble puzzle for The Telegraph, and compiles the content for an annual desktop Scrabble puzzle calendar.

Allan Simmons has won the British Matchplay Scrabble Championship five times, The Scottish Championships four times, the UK Masters three times, the UK National Scrabble Championship once, and played at the World Scrabble Championship eight times.

In October 2017, Simmons received a three-year ban for cheating. A committee member for the Association of British Scrabble Players, Elie Dangoor, stated that three independent witnesses allegedly saw Simmons put a hand with freshly drawn letter tiles back into a bag to draw more tiles during officially sanctioned matches – a move that is contrary to the rules of the game. An official statement from the Association of British Scrabble Players issued to its members announced that the ban was a result of an investigation by an independent panel following these allegations. Simmons was subsequently stripped of the ABSP Masters title for 2016.
