= UK Open (Scrabble) =

British Scrabble tournament

The UK OPEN Scrabble Tournament is a British Scrabble tournament that was first organised in 2008. It is one of five major flagship tournaments overseen by the Association of British Scrabble Players (ABSP).

== History ==
The five-day tournament has been held every year since 2008. The prize pool was £13,000 in 2011 and has become the largest Scrabble tournament in Europe. Players from as far away as Australia, Nigeria, and the United States have participated.

The event consists of an 18-game warm-up event running over two days followed by a separate 30-game main event running over 3-days. The former awards a smaller pool of prize money than the latter. Players may enter one of both of these, but the official title of UK Open Champion is awarded to the winner of the main event. The tournament has revolutionized Scrabble in the UK.

Founder and organiser Len Moir said:

"There are people from around the globe. It’s one week, a great prize fund and 48 games – Coventry was chosen because it’s the centre of England and it has great air links. With Birmingham Airport nearby"

Since 2012, tournament has been held at the Quality Hotel in Allesley. The tournament had previously been held at The Aston Court Hotel on Holyhead Road. 10-time UK Open champion Nigel Richards, who represents New Zealand at the UK Open, is the most successful player at the tournament. Only three other players have won the title to date: Helen Gipson in 2009, Paul Allan in 2015 and Ed Martin in 2020.

== Previous Winners ==
Grand prize winners of the UK Open Scrabble Tournament

| Tournament Date | Location | Prize Fund | Winner |
|---|---|---|---|
| 2020 | Coventry | ? | Ed Martin |
| 2019 | ? | ? | Nigel Richards (10) |
| 2018 | ? | ? | Nigel Richards (9) |
| 2017 | Coventry | > £8,000 | Nigel Richards (8) |
| 2016 | Coventry | > £8,000 | Nigel Richards (7) |
| 2015 | Coventry | > £8,000 | Paul Allan |
| 2014 | Coventry | > £8,000 | Nigel Richards (6) |
| 2013 | Coventry | > £8,000 | Nigel Richards (5) |
| 2012 | Coventry | > £8,000 | Nigel Richards (4) |
| 2011 | Coventry | > £8,000 | Nigel Richards (3) |
| 2010 | Coventry | > £8,000 | Nigel Richards (2) |
| 5–9 January 2009 | Coventry | > £8,000 | Helen Gipson |
| 7–11 January 2008 | Coventry | > £8,000 | Nigel Richards (1) |
