= Craig Beevers =

English Scrabble player

- Born: Norton, County Durham, England
- Occupation: Professional Scrabble player
- Years active: 2003–present
- Known for: 2014 World Scrabble Champion

Craig Beevers is an English professional Scrabble player and former World Scrabble Champion.

== Professional career ==
=== 2014 ===
In the World Championship, or Scrabble Champions Tournament (SCT) as it was dubbed that year and in 2013, Beevers defeated Alastair Richards 2–1 in a best-of-three quarter-finals. He went on to beat Dave Wiegand 3–2 in a best-of-five semi-finals. After securing a 3–1 win against Chris Lipe in a best-of-five finals, Beevers became the 2014 World Scrabble Champion, and only the second Englishman to do so after Mark Nyman (1993).

=== 2015 ===
Beevers won the UK National Championship, and hit a peak rating of 2161 (World No. 7), but failed to defend his title at the 2015 World Scrabble Championship, at which he finished 9th.

=== 2016 ===
Beevers finished in 57th place (amongst a field of 72) at the MSI World Scrabble Championship 2016. He also lost his title of National Champion to Phil Robertshaw at the 2016 National Scrabble Championship in October, ending up in 14th place.

== Other endeavours ==
Beevers is a former contestant of the television programme Countdown. He won series 57 of this game show, which involves finding anagrams up to 9 letters and calculated mathematical problems. He is also the webmaster for the websites of both the World English-Language Scrabble Players' Association (WESPA) and the Association of British Scrabble Players (ABSP). He and fellow Scrabble player Ray Tate attempted to break the world record for most points scored in 24 hours of Scrabble in 2012, but the effort had to be shelved after Tate "keeled over with dehydration after 15 hours of play". The duo "unofficially" broke the record a year later, according to GazetteLive. In May 2015, Beevers guest-wrote an oped for The Guardian titled "As world Scrabble champion, I think new words are obvs lolz", in response to the addition of some 6,500 new words to the official lexicon used in competitive Scrabble, Collins Official Scrabble Words published by HarperCollins. Beevers authored a book on how to "(p)lay like a Scrabble world champion" titled Word Addict; it was published by HarperCollins in 2015. The same year, as part of World Scrabble Day celebrations, Beevers took part in a 24-hour Scrabble marathon that was streamed online.

== Personal life ==
Craig Beevers was born and raised in Norton, County Durham, England. He attended the University of Sheffield.

== Bibliography ==
- Beevers, Craig (2015). Word Addict. HarperCollins. ISBN 9780008146474.
