= World Scrabble Championship 2007 =

- 9 November 2007 – 12 November 2007
- Winner: Nigel Richards
- Number of players: 104
- Location: Mumbai, India
- Sponsor: Mattel

The World Scrabble Championship 2007 was held in the Taj President Hotel, Mumbai, India between 9 November and 12 November. The winner was Nigel Richards of New Zealand.

The tournament began with a 24-round Swiss tournament, whose top two players contested a best-of-five final.

== Results ==
The preliminary stage involved 104 players, the largest number of players in WSC history, over 24 rounds, using the "Chew Pairing" system to select the draw for each round.

Nigel Richards beat Ganesh Asirvatham of Malaysia 3–0 in the final. This was the first time either of them had reached the final. Ganesh was the number 1 rated player in the world at the time, and Nigel the form player had always been knocking on the door in majors and was a multiple winner of the Brand's Crossword Game King's Cup including 2007.

Nigel won the first game 412–316. He bingoed VARSITy; Ganesh bingoed sERINGA. Nigel's opening play was GAVOT with the V on the centre star. During the game Ganesh missed the bingo OUTCRAWL.

Nigel won the second game 400–371. Ganesh took an early lead with AETHERS but had to exchange tiles twice, and although he caught up again with ANTIENTS and a late-game bingo DUPLiED, and Nigel only bingoed once with ODONAtE, Nigel won on the strength of the value he got out of the J, Q and X with JERBIL, QUOHOG and FAX.

Nigel wins the third game 499–470 and becomes New Zealand's first world champion. This game was a bingo-fest with Nigel's RECOPIES, EQuINIAS and OVERAPT to Ganesh's TRECKING, ADNATION, DIrTIEST and a triple-triple TAILLEUR. However, once again, Nigel's luck with drawing the high scoring letters saw him have the edge in a fitting finale.

== Complete results ==
Position	Name	Country	Win–loss	Spread	Prize (USD)
1	Richards, Nigel	New Zealand	19–5	+1594	15,000
2	Asirvatham, Ganesh	Malaysia	18–6	+2501	6,000
3	Jighere, Wellington	Nigeria	18–6	+1635	3,000
4	Wapnick, Joel	Canada	17–7	+1075	2,000
5	Bhandarkar, Akshay	United Arab Emirates	16–8	+1056	1,000
6	Litunya, Patrick	Kenya	16–8	+845	900
7	Wee, Ming Hui Hubert	Singapore	16–8	+824	800
8	Adamson, Tim	United States	16–8	-363	700
9	Umujose, Emmanuel	Nigeria	15–9	+983	600
10	Oyekunle, Lanre	South Africa	15–9	+907	500
11	David Eldar	World Youth Champion	15–9	+578	
12	Ong, Suanne	Malaysia	15–9	+503	
13	Okulicz, Edward	Australia	15–9	+263	
14	Sukhumrattanaporn, Charnwit	Thailand	15–9	-103	
15	Helen Gipson	England	14½–9½	+376	
16	Fisher, Andrew	Australia	14–10	+1154	
17	Boys, David	Canada	14–10	+682	
18	Panyasophonlert, Komol	Thailand	14–10	+542	
19	Williams, Gareth	Wales	14–10	+419	
20	Sulaiman, Mohammad	Pakistan	14–10	+414	
21	Thevenot, Geoff	United States	14–10	+407	
22	Warner, Howard	New Zealand	14–10	+365	
23	Webb, David	England	14–10	+266	
24	Kramer, Jim	United States	14–10	+198	
25	Adam Logan	World Champion	14–10	+140	
26	Brousson, Theresa	Malta	14–10	-124	
27	Rio, Odette Carmina	Philippines	13½–10½	+506	
28	O'Laughlin, John	United States	13–11	+1050	
29	Kantimathi, Sam	United States	13–11	+850	
30	Gongolo, Michael	Kenya	13–11	+516	
31	Fernando, Naween Tharanga	Australia	13–11	+371	
32	Benedict, Nathan	United States	13–11	+333	
33	Cheah, Siu Hean	Singapore	13–11	+322	
34	Hovelmeier, Trevor Mark	South Africa	13–11	+272	
35	Chakrabarti, Amit	United States	13–11	+207	
36	Tamas, Adrian	Romania	13–11	+96	
37	Hoekstra, Ron	Canada	13–11	+76	
38	Carter, Gerald	Thailand	13–11	+75	
39	Robertshaw, Phil	England	13–11	+5	
40	Simmons, Allan	Scotland	13–11	-4	
41	Lobo, Ralph	Oman	13–11	-80	
42	Allan, Paul	Scotland	13–11	-363	
43	Appleby, Phil	England	13–11	-538	
44	Katz-Brown, Jason	United States	12–12	+692	
45	Dennis, Di	England	12–12	+534	
46	Kirk, Terry	England	12–12	+251	
47	Saldanha, Dean	Canada	12–12	+248	
48	Hingorani, Varisht	India	12–12	+214	
49	Baker, Michael	United States	12–12	+167	
50	Sujjayakorn, Panupol	Thailand	12–12	+165	
51	Philpotts, Adam	England	12–12	+164	
52	Berofsky, Evan	Canada	12–12	+158	
53	Schellenberg, Mark	Canada	12–12	+100	
54	Martin, Edward	England	12–12	-91	
55	Lamabadusuriya, Harshan	England	12–12	-148	
56	Saengsit, Weera	Thailand	12–12	-177	
57	May, Christopher	Australia	12–12	-214	
58	Iqbal, Wajid	Pakistan	12–12	-285	
59	Martus, Teodoro	Philippines	12–12	-337	
60	Ali, Mohammed Zafar	Bahrain	12–12	-580	
61	Pratt, Daniel	United States	11½–12½	+69	
62	Manase, Joshua Otieno	Kenya	11–13	+507	
63	Grant, Jeff	New Zealand	11–13	+348	
64	Gabriel, Marty	United States	11–13	+211	
65	Kelly, Wayne	England	11–13	-66	
66	Ikekeregor, Dennis	Nigeria	11–13	-149	
67	Linn, Robert	United States	11–13	-258	
68	Kenas, Mark	United States	11–13	-315	
69	Credo, Ronald	Philippines	11–13	-319	
70	Chow, Jie Ming Benjamin	Singapore	11–13	-346	
71	Jackman, Bob	Australia	11–13	-356	
72	Polatnick, Steve	United States	11–13	-452	
73	Matsuda, Manabu	Japan	11–13	-975	
74	Buddhdev, Anand	Netherlands	11–13	-1035	
75	MacNeil, Rod	United States	11–13	-1090	
76	Wachira, Francis	Kenya	10½–13½	-417	
77	Charles, Leslie	Barbados	10–14	+102	
78	Rodrigues, Sherwin	India	10–14	+11	
79	Anthonius, Ferdy	Indonesia	10–14	-260	
80	Chunkath, Mohan Verghese	India	10–14	-270	
81	Wanniarachchi, Lakshan	Sri Lanka	10–14	-286	
82	Delicata, David	Malta	10–14	-306	
83	Butler, Lynne	New Zealand	10–14	-322	
84	Delia, Jojo	Malta	10–14	-406	
85	Kalumba, Paul Yandisha	Zambia	10–14	-443	
86	Hemachandra, Sanath	Oman	10–14	-576	
87	O'Neill, Shane	Wales	10–14	-950	
88	Chakravarthy, Ranganathan	India	9–15	-8	
89	Leah, Tony	Canada	9–15	-376	
90	Craig, Joanne	New Zealand	9–15	-445	
91	Amarasinghe, Asanka	Sri Lanka	9–15	-468	
92	Amarasinghe, Indunil	Sri Lanka	9–15	-531	
93	Ajayi, Olajide Ademola	Ireland	9–15	-533	
94	Bohbot, Herve	France	9–15	-542	
95	Esmail, Mushtak	Tanzania	9–15	-551	
96	Jegels, Llewellin	Germany, Federal Republic of	9–15	-686	
97	Collins, Frederick	Guyana	9–15	-786	
98	Usakiewicz, Wojciech	Poland	8–16	-844	
99	Reshamwala, Shakir	Kuwait	8–16	-883	
100	Ntege, Chris	Uganda	8–16	-984	
101	Kuroda, Kunihiko	Japan	8–16	-1003	
102	Modeste, Anthony	Trinidad and Tobago	8–16	-1011	
103	Nässén, Greger	Sweden	6½–17½	-2347	
104	Alban, Loreta	Qatar	5½–18½	-1345	

- FINALS:
- Game 1: Nigel 412 – Ganesh 316
- Game 2: Nigel 400 – Ganesh 371
- Game 3: Nigel 499 – Ganesh 470
