= World Scrabble Championship 2001 =

- November 13, 2001 – November 17, 2001
- Winner: Brian Cappelletto
- Number of players: 88
- Location: Las Vegas, Nevada
- Sponsor: Hasbro

The World Scrabble Championship 2001 was the sixth World Scrabble Championship. The winner was Brian Cappelletto of the United States.

The event took place at The Venetian on the Las Vegas Strip, USA. The eighty-eight players played eight games on each of the first three days, in a Swiss tournament. As usual, the top two players then competed in a best-of-five final to decide who would become world champion.

== Results ==
After the Swiss tournament, the top two players were Brian Cappelletto representing the United States, with 18 wins and winning spread of +921, and Joel Wapnick, defending champion from 1999, with 17 wins and winning spread +1006. These two players thus contested the final.

In the first game of the final, Wapnick played first. Both players began by changing tiles, then exchanged straightforward bingos (ANALYSE and IRATELY respectively). Further highlights included Wapnick's WHEEP and BAJU and Cappelletto's INDUSIA. In the final move, trailing 482–464 and with only the O remaining on his rack, Cappelletto needed to score 16 points to force a draw. Unfortunately for him, there was no such move available and, while he played the best available move (ZO for 13), Wapnick took the game 482–479.

The second game was less high-scoring, with only two bonuses; Wapnick's DRESSING and CONDOLER. Despite this, Cappelletto won the game 410–372 to level the match at 1–1.

In the third game, Wapnick began the game with a bonus (LOURINg for 64), but Cappelletto won a claustrophobic game 400–352, and lead the match 2–1. Notably, he finished with just six seconds left, and his opponent had only four seconds remaining.

The fourth game proved decisive, as Cappelletto again won by a comfortable margin, 444 to 338.

By three games to one, Brian Cappelletto was declared World Scrabble Champion 2001.

== Complete Results ==
Position	Name	Country	Win–loss	Spread	Prize (USD)
1	Cappelletto, Brian	United States	18–6	+921	25,000
2	Wapnick, Joel	Canada	17–7	+1006	10,000
3	Kramer, Jim	United States	17–7	+597	5,000
4	Polatnick, Steve	United States	16½–7½	+533	3,000
5	Fisher, Andrew	England	16–8	+1043	2,000
6	Lipton, Bob	United States	16–8	+735	1,000
7	Smitheram, Brett	England	16–8	+656	800
8	Okosagah, Sammy	Nigeria	16–8	-64	600
9	Wiegand, David	United States	15½–8½	+1085	400
10	Logan, Adam	Canada	15–9	+801	300
11	Fernando, Naween Tharanga	Sri Lanka	15–9	+772	250
12	Sinton, Peter	New Zealand	15–9	+674	250
13	Gongolo, Michael	Kenya	15–9	+528	250
14	Geary, Jim	United States	15–9	+364	250
15	Mallick, Joey	United States	15–9	+314	250
16	Nemitrmansuk, Pakorn	Thailand	15–9	-271	150
17	Sim, Tony	Singapore	14–10	+717	150
18	Awowade, Femi	England	14–10	+628	150
19	Warner, Howard	New Zealand	14–10	+379	150
20	Edley, Joe	United States	14–10	+371	150
21	Simmons, Allan	England	14–10	+272	
22	Perry, Andrew	England	14–10	+243	
23	Okulicz, Edward	Australia	14–10	+228	
24	Credo, Ronald	Philippines	14–10	-118	
25	Luebkemann, John	United States	13½–10½	+630	
26	Felt, Robert	United States	13–11	+1022	
27	Davis, Andrew	England	13–11	+631	
28	Chinnaiyah, Suresh	Sri Lanka	13–11	+545	
29	Klaphajone, Jakkrit	Thailand	13–11	+355	
30	Manase, Joshua Otieno	Kenya	13–11	+344	
31	Mead, Jeremiah	United States	13–11	+268	
32	Sykes, Christopher	Canada	13–11	+259	
33	Grant, Jeff	New Zealand	13–11	+113	
34	Williams, Gareth	Wales	13–11	+87	
35	Quao, Michael Arthur	Ghana	13–11	+62	
36	Asirvatham, Ganesh	Malaysia	13–11	-7	
37	Elbourne, Peter	Malta	13–11	-557	
38	Hirai, Keiichiro	Japan	12–12	+676	
39	Boys, David	Canada	12–12	+465	
40	Holgate, John	Australia	12–12	+414	
41	Simpson, Evan	England	12–12	+231	
42	Daniel, Robin Pollock	Canada	12–12	+194	
43	Hersom, Randy	United States	12–12	+167	
44	Kaufman, Zev	Canada	12–12	+135	
45	Hoekstra, Ron	Canada	12–12	+122	
46	Graham, Matt	United States	12–12	+3	
47	Gruzd, Steven	South Africa	12–12	-54	
48	Eichler, Maor	Israel	12–12	-201	
49	Khoshnaw, Karl	Kurdistan-Iraq	12–12	-279	
50	Talbot, Rodney	Australia	12–12	-297	
51	Sherman, Joel	United States	12–12	-349	
52	Hovelmeier, Trevor Mark	South Africa	12–12	-654	
53	Boyd, Kendall	New Zealand	11–13	+244	
54	Apindi, Isaac	Tanzania	11–13	+216	
55	Filio, Roland	Philippines	11–13	+177	
56	Lamabadusuriya, Harshan	Sri Lanka	11–13	+136	
57	Cherry, James	Canada	11–13	+62	
58	Tang, Michael	Malaysia	11–13	-16	
59	Chunkath, Mohan Verghese	India	11–13	-158	
60	Acton, David	England	11–13	-196	
61	Cheah, Siu Hean	Singapore	11–13	-380	
62	Poku, Kwame	Ghana	11–13	-435	
63	De Souza, Margarida Ana	Trinidad and Tobago	11–13	-600	
64	Assesa, Dixon	Kenya	10½–13½	-70	
65	Ranasuriya, Mario Shalendra	Bahrain	10½–13½	-753	
66	Clottey, Aaron	Ghana	10½–13½	-776	
67	Litunya, Patrick	Kenya	10–14	+131	
68	Webb, David	England	10–14	+125	
69	Cleary, Paul Stephen	Australia	10–14	-81	
70	Arreola, Pepito	Saudi Arabia	10–14	-262	
71	Khan, Rashid Ateeq	Pakistan	10–14	-378	
72	Tanee, Samuel Fomum	Cameroon	10–14	-757	
73	Kalumba, Paul Yandisha	Zambia	9½–14½	-496	
74	Delicata, David	Malta	9½–14½	-974	
75	Grayson, John	Wales	9–15	+134	
76	Sutthasin, Taewan	Thailand	9–15	-296	
77	Abordo, Chris	Bahrain	9–15	-377	
78	Sinclair, Alan	Scotland	9–15	-412	
79	Hemachandra, Sanath	Oman	9–15	-809	
80	Cree, Chris	United States	9–15	-1118	
81	Chakravarthy, Ranganathan	India	8½–15½	-82	
82	Singh, Lewis	Guyana	8–16	-834	
83	Prabhu, Cecil Fernandes	Gulf Champion	8–16	-1124	
84	Sandu, Dan Laurentiu	Romania	8–16	-1759	
85	Miranda, Mario	Philippines	7½–16½	-872	
86	Costello, Catherine	Ireland	7–17	-691	
87	Cotejo, Danny	Qatar	5–19	-1287	
88	Wright, James Charles	Gibraltar	4–20	-1971	

- FINALS:
- Game 1: Wapnick 482 – Cappelletto 479
- Game 2: Cappelletto 410 – Wapnick 372
- Game 3: Cappelletto 400 – Wapnick 352
- Game 4: Cappelletto 444 – Wapnick 338
