= World Scrabble Championship 2015 =

- 4 November 2015 – 8 November 2015
- Winner: Wellington Jighere
- Number of players: 131
- Location: Perth, Australia
- Sponsor: WESPA

The WESPA World Scrabble Championship 2015 (also known as WESPA Championship or WESPAC) was organised by WESPA, the World English-language Scrabble Players' Association, which commissioned ASPA, the Australian Scrabble Players Association, to hold a World Scrabble Championship invitational event in Perth, Western Australia from November 4 to 8. Mattel and Mind Sports International agreed to this.

== Results ==
The winner was Wellington Jighere of Nigeria who defeated Lewis Mackay of England by four games to nil in the best-of-seven finals.

There were 131 qualifiers and it was the first time that the World Championships was won by a player from Africa.

In the first game, Wellington had bingos TINDALs, FAHLORES and VICIaTES while Lewis had TITTERED and OBEISANT, while missing bingo AUTO(G)ENY and a high scoring NIQAB later. Wellington won 529–398.

In the second game, Wellington had bingos AsTHORE, BLINGIER and OERSTEDS while Lewis had COnTROLE and a few 35+ plays. Wellington won 438–410.

In the third game, Wellington had bingos QUOITERS, MATTERED, MENTORED and ADAGIAL while Lewis had BELAYING and a 61-point CODA. Wellington won 563–459.

In the fourth game, Wellington had bingos CREASED and GAINLIER and a 93-point QUIZ while Lewis had AVOUCHED and IRONISTS and a 66-point JOMO. Wellington finished with a 36-point FELTY to win the game 449–432 and take the title of World Champion.
