= Brett Smitheram =

British Scrabble player

- Born: 1979 (age 46–47)
- Known for: World Scrabble Champion (2016)

Brett Smitheram is a British Scrabble Grand Master and one of the most successful players in the history of the game. Smitheram was 2022 UK National Scrabble Champion, defeating a high-calibre field in June that year. He won the 2016 World Scrabble Championship and has been ranked in the World top 5, and as a UK Scrabble Grand Master for nearly 20 years. Originally from Camborne, Cornwall, and a former pupil of Truro School, he lives in London and is HR Director for the Pozitive Energy group, including PE Dot Solutions, Pozitive Water, Pozitive Payments and Pozitive Telecoms.

Smitheram won the UK National Scrabble Championship in 2000 and 2022, the ABSP Masters invitational event in 2005 and the British Matchplay Scrabble Championship in 2003, 2004, 2006 and 2010. He is three-times Northern Ireland Champion, having won in 2011, 2017 and 2018. Entering only 2 UK majors in 2019 (SIMPLE, which replaced the Spring Matchplay for that year, and the British Elimination Scrabble Tournament/BEST) Smitheram won both ahead of large and high-calibre fields. Smitheram has won the award for UK highest rated player a record 5 times (most recently, the last time it was awarded in 2019) and is current UK number 1.

In 2016, he defeated Mark Nyman at the MSI World Scrabble Championship 3 games to 0 to become the World Scrabble Champion for the first time, in the process playing the word BRACONID for 176 (+5 for a failed challenge) which was reported on widely by global media. Following his World Championship win, Smitheram has continued to compete locally and globally, winning multiple tournaments, and narrowly missing out on his second World Championship Final in 2018, losing to Nigel Richards, the eventual winner, in the semi-final. He remains an active contributor and spokesperson to the global media on Scrabble and gaming topics.

In 1997, Smitheram won six episodes of the gameshow Countdown, qualifying him for the finals stage of Series 37.
