= Andrew Fisher (Scrabble player) =

English-Australian Scrabble champion

Andrew Fisher is an international Scrabble player who represented England in international competition but now lives in and represents Australia having emigrated in 2002. He was the World Scrabble Championship 2011 runner-up, the UK National Scrabble Champion in 1996 and the Australian National Scrabble Champion in 2006, 2009 and 2012. He co-wrote a book called How to Win at Scrabble with David Webb, and was the champion of series one of the SBS Television game show Letters and Numbers. He is a chartered accountant by profession.
