= World Scrabble Championship 2005 =

- 16 November 2005 – 20 November 2005
- Winner: Adam Logan
- Number of players: 102
- Location: London, England
- Sponsor: Mattel

The World Scrabble Championship 2005 was held in the Marriott Regent's Park Hotel, London, England between 16 November and 20 November. The winner was Adam Logan of Canada.

As in previous years, the tournament began with a 24-round Swiss tournament over three days. The top two players from this phase contested a best-of-five final.

== Results ==
The preliminary stage involved 102 players over 24 rounds, using the "Chew Pairing" system to select the draw for each round.

Adam Logan beat Pakorn Nemitrmansuk of Thailand 3–0 in the final. Notably, Nemitrmansuk was also the runner-up finalist at WSC 2003.

Adam won the first game 524–409. Pakorn bingoed EDACIOUS, GRINDER and VALETiNG while Adam could only manage one (STATURE) until he ended the game with a rare triple-triple TWISTIeR, which clinched it for him as Pakorn ran out of time.

Adam won the second game 520–316 with bingoes RIBANDS, GNaRRED, CLOGGER and ELODEAS while Pakorn managed CATTAILS and VAUNTIER, and lost points on letters and time once again.

Adam won the third game 465–426 to clinch the title. Bingoes from Adam were AURATES, REcOINED, ANCOnES and from Pakorn were TEAMING and BIRSLED.

This was the fourth time in eight events that a Canadian had won, including one year in which a Canadian played for the United States.

== Complete results ==
Position	Name	Country	Win–loss	Spread	Prize (USD)
1	Logan, Adam	Canada	20–4	+1613	15,000
2	Nemitrmansuk, Pakorn	Thailand	18–6	+678	6,000
3	Fernando, Naween Tharanga	Australia	17–7	+741	3,000
4	Asirvatham, Ganesh	Malaysia	16–8	+690	2,000
5	Williams, Gareth	Wales	16–8	+664	1,000
6	Cleary, Paul Stephen	Australia	16–8	+643	900
7	Boys, David	Canada	16–8	+612	800
8	Wiegand, David	United States	16–8	+599	700
9	Owolabi, Lukeman	Nigeria	15–9	+832	600
10	Cheah, Siu Hean	Singapore	15–9	+776	500
11	David Eldar	Australia	15–9	+672	
12	Allan, Paul	Scotland	15–9	+591	
13	Saldanha, Dean	Canada	15–9	+414	
14	O'Laughlin, John	United States	15–9	+367	
15	Quao, Michael Arthur	Ghana	14½–9½	+725	
16	Sujjayakorn, Panupol	Thailand	14½–9½	+422	
17	Lamabadusuriya, Harshan	England	14–10	+1209	
18	Warner, Howard	New Zealand	14–10	+894	
19	Sherman, Joel	United States	14–10	+847	
20	Kirk, Terry	England	14–10	+770	
21	Fisher, Andrew	Australia	14–10	+724	
22	Placca, Chrys	Ghana	14–10	+437	
23	Rivera, Oscar T.	Philippines	14–10	+254	
24	Martin, Edward	England	14–10	+210	
25	Adamson, Tim	United States	14–10	+166	
26	Bhandarkar, Akshay	India	14–10	+127	
27	Phiphatboonserm, Manop	Thailand	14–10	-553	
28	Armstrong, Peter	United States	14–10	-815	
29	Gipson, Helen	England	13–11	+736	
30	Polatnick, Steve	United States	13–11	+492	
31	Ball, Nick	England	13–11	+407	
32	Hahn, Albert	Canada	13–11	+405	
33	Wapnick, Joel	Canada	13–11	+395	
34	Luebkemann, John	United States	13–11	+392	
35	Brousson, Theresa	Malta	13–11	+349	
36	Awowade, Femi	England	13–11	+332	
37	Hirai, Keiichiro	Japan	13–11	+330	
38	Odom, Lisa	United States	13–11	+272	
39	Delia, Jojo	Malta	13–11	+260	
40	Ananga, Yawo Takyi	Ghana	13–11	+183	
41	Appleby, Phil	England	13–11	+167	
42	Carter, Gerald	Thailand	12½–11½	+249	
43	Smitheram, Brett	England	12½–11½	+117	
44	Davis, Andrew	England	12–12	+808	
45	Byers, Russell	England	12–12	+469	
46	Mallick, Joey	United States	12–12	+361	
47	Richards, Nigel	New Zealand	12–12	+294	
48	Tabasa, John Edward	Philippines	12–12	+289	
49	Lerman, Jerry	United States	12–12	+246	
50	Hoekstra, Ron	Canada	12–12	+200	
51	Kenas, Mark	United States	12–12	+196	
52	Nyman, Mark	England	12–12	+193	
53	Poder, David	United States	12–12	+60	
54	Goh, Jiang Pern	Singapore	12–12	-159	
55	Talosig, Rogelio	New Zealand	12–12	-376	
56	Ul-Haq, Assad	Qatar	12–12	-386	
57	Litunya, Patrick	Kenya	12–12	-452	
58	Kaufman, Zev	Canada	12–12	-507	
59	Grant, Jeff	New Zealand	11½–12½	-553	
60	Katz-Brown, Jason	United States	11–13	+663	
61	Kramer, Jim	United States	11–13	+318	
62	Finley, Peter	England	11–13	+257	
63	Charles, Leslie	Trinidad and Tobago	11–13	+179	
64	Oduwole, Olatunde	Nigeria	11–13	+136	
65	Capuno, Leonardo	United Arab Emirates	11–13	+132	
66	Khoshnaw, Karl	Kurdistan-Iraq	11–13	-9	
67	Lobo, Ralph	Oman	11–13	-27	
68	Kurnia, Andy	Singapore	11–13	-48	
69	Hersom, Randy	United States	11–13	-367	
70	Rodrigues, Sherwin	India	11–13	-487	
71	Kalumba, Paul Yandisha	Zambia	11–13	-667	
72	Early, Dylan	South Africa	11–13	-813	
73	Ikolo, Anthony	Nigeria	11–13	-981	
74	Yeo, Kien Hung	Malaysia	10½–13½	+95	
75	Simmons, Allan	Scotland	10–14	+416	
76	Jabbar, Abdul	Pakistan	10–14	+221	
77	Sayavesa, Navapadol	Thailand	10–14	+48	
78	Sinton, Peter	New Zealand	10–14	-208	
79	Amalean, Shaila	Sri Lanka	10–14	-518	
80	Wanniarachchi, Lakshan	Sri Lanka	10–14	-532	
81	Cohen, Evan	Israel	10–14	-615	
82	Prabhu, Cecil Fernandes	Oman	10–14	-623	
83	Khan, Rashid Ateeq	Pakistan	10–14	-625	
84	Fomum, Samuel Tanee	Cameroon	10–14	-665	
85	Green, Neil	Wales	10–14	-698	
86	Buddhdev, Anand	Netherlands	10–14	-1399	
87	Hovelmeier, Trevor Mark	South Africa	9½–14½	+581	
88	Bwire, Matayo	Kenya	9–15	+65	
89	Raychbart, Paloma	Israel	9–15	-398	
90	McDonnell, Brendan	Ireland	9–15	-556	
91	Filio, Ben	Bahrain	9–15	-806	
92	Amarasinghe, Samitha	Sri Lanka	9–15	-900	
93	Bohbot, Herve	France	9–15	-901	
94	Ntege, Chris	Uganda	9–15	-1115	
95	Ahmad, Adeeb	Bahrain	9–15	-1187	
96	Zbikowski, Mateusz	Poland	9–15	-1652	
97	Tanveer, Rohaina	Kuwait	8½–15½	-1061	
98	Anthonius, Ferdy	Indonesia	8–16	-402	
99	Esmail, Mushtak	Tanzania	8–16	-791	
100	Sandu, Dan Laurentiu	Romania	6–18	-1413	
101	Kuroda, Kunihiko	Japan	6–18	-1844	
102	Bjorkman, Marten	Sweden	5–19	-1806	

- FINALS:
- Game 1: Adam 524 – Pakorn 409
- Game 2: Adam 520 – Pakorn 316
- Game 3: Adam 465 – Pakorn 426

== Participants ==
Places were allocated by country. The number of places per country was:

- U.S., 15 places
- England, 10 places
- Canada, 7 places
- New Zealand, 5 places
- Australia, 4 places
- Kenya, 4 places
- Thailand, 4 places
- Ghana, 3 places
- Philippines, 3 places
- Nigeria, 3 places
- Singapore, 3 places
- Sri Lanka, 3 places
- Bahrain, 2 places
- India, 2 places
- Israel, 2 places
- Japan, 2 places
- Malaysia, 2 places
- Malta, 2 places
- Oman, 2 places
- Pakistan, 2 places
- Scotland, 2 places
- South Africa, 2 places
- Wales, 2 places
- Cameroon, 1 place
- France, 1 place
- Gibraltar, 1 place
- Guyana, 1 place
- Indonesia, 1 place
- Ireland, 1 place
- Kurdistan-Iraq, 1 place
- Kuwait, 1 place
- Poland, 1 place
- Romania, 1 place
- Saudi Arabia, 1 place
- Seychelles, 1 place
- Sweden, 1 place
- Tanzania, 1 place
- Trinidad, 1 place
- U.A.E., 1 place
- Uganda, 1 place
- Zambia, 1 place

Panupol Sujjayakorn qualified automatically as defending World Champion, and so did not count towards Thailand's quota.
