= Bingo (Scrabble) =

Term used in Scrabble in North America

Bingo is a term used in North American Scrabble for a play in which a player uses all seven of their tiles in a single turn. Mattel, the game's manufacturer outside North America, uses the term bonus to describe such a word. In French, it is called a scrabble. In Nigeria, where Scrabble is a national game, it is often called a "premium". A player who does this receives a 50-point bonus, which is applied after the rest of the play is scored.

Bingos are an important part of achieving high scores in Scrabble. While many beginners rarely play even one during a game, experts frequently score three or more. Much advanced strategy revolves around maximizing one's chance of playing a bingo: blank tiles are kept, poor letter combinations such as BVW, GKUUV, IIIUU, or LLNNN are broken up, and flexible letter combinations such as AEINST (a six-letter "stem" that anagrams with 24 letters—all but Q and Y—to form at least 73 bingos) are aimed for until a bingo is formed. This strategy is often at direct odds with that of placing high-value letters on premium squares.

The highest-scoring bingo ever played in an official Scrabble tournament was by Karl Khoshnaw, who got 392 points for CAZIQUES in a 1982 game in Manchester.

== Bingo examples ==
These facts are according to the SOWPODS lexicon as amended in 2006.

- The highest scoring 7-letter bingo is "MUZJIKS". Though the sum total of the seven tiles is 29 points, if the Z is placed on the double letter square (for maximum score value), the resulting score is (39x2) + 50 = 128 points.
- The highest scoring 8-letter bingo in Collins is "QUIZZIFY" (using a blank for one of the Zs). Placed on two triple-word squares with the Z on a double letter square, it scores 419.
- The highest scoring 8-letter bingo in TWL and the highest scoring 8-letter bingo without a blank is "QUINZHEE", which amounts to 401 points when played across two triple-word squares.
- The lowest possible score for a bingo is 56. This is achieved by making an 8-letter word with six one-point tiles and two blanks, or by making a 7-letter word with one blank and a two-letter word with both blanks. The word must not be doubled or tripled, and no one-point tile may be doubled or tripled. A 55-point bingo is theoretically possible in tournament play, by making a two-blank play on an empty board that misses the center star.
- The highest scoring 15-letter bingo is theoretically "Oxyphenbutazone" (an anti-inflammatory drug once used mostly to treat arthritis). With 8 letters already placed between three triples, the word can score 1785. There are no reports of a triple-triple-triple ever being played in a competitive game, as it requires very unlikely circumstances.
- Based on the tile frequency, the most likely bingos in SOWPODS are OTARINE#/NOTAIRE#, followed by ETAERIO# (the # denotes words not in the TWL lexicon). Using the TWL lexicon, the most probable bingos are ANEROID, AILERON/ALIENOR, ATONIES, ELATION/TOENAIL, and ERASION, followed by ARENITE/RETINAE/TRAINEE.
- The 7-letter bingo alphagram that form the highest number of anagrams is AEINRST, which forms nine words in TWL: ANESTRI, ANTSIER, NASTIER, RATINES, RETAINS, RETINAS, RETSINA, STAINER, and STEARIN (CSW also has RESIANT# and STARNIE#.)
