= Adam Logan =

Canadian-American mathematician and Scrabble player

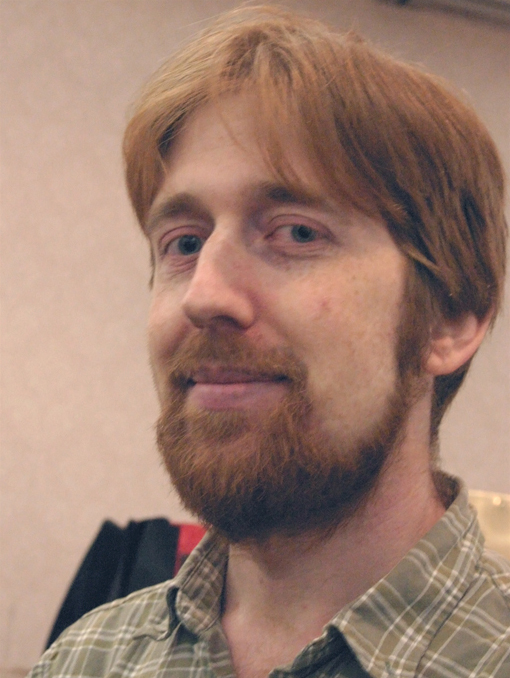
- Logan in 2007
- Born: Kingston, Ontario, Canada
- Education: Harvard University (PhD, 1999); Harvard University (AM, 1996); Princeton University (AB, 1995)
- Awards: Putnam Fellow
- Scientific career
- Fields: Mathematics
- Workplaces: Tutte Institute
- Thesis: Moduli Spaces of Curves with Marked Points (1999)
- Doctoral advisor: Joseph Daniel Harris
- Website: https://sites.google.com/view/adamlogan/home

Adam Logan is a Canadian-American mathematician and tournament Scrabble player. His work is primarily in arithmetic geometry and algebraic geometry. In Scrabble, he has won the World Scrabble Championship in 2005 and 2025.

== Early life, education, and personal life ==
Logan is the son of George Logan and Michal Ben-Gera, who both described Logan as mathematically gifted as a child. He attended the Lisgar Collegiate Institute. He was a Putnam Fellow in 1992 and 1993. He completed his first degree, in mathematics, at Princeton University in 1995, graduating at the top of his class and received a PhD from Harvard University in 1999.

== Scrabble ==
Logan competed in his first Scrabble tournament in 1985, at age 10, in which he placed fourth; he was only entered into the tournament due to an odd player count. He first played using the wordlist of the Official Scrabble Players Dictionary, first playing with the Collins Scrabble Words in the early 2000s, while working in England.

Logan is one of three players who have won the World Scrabble Championship more than once. In 2005, he won the championship against Pakorn Nemitrmansuk of Thailand, 3–0 in the final, and in 2025, won against Nigel Richards of New Zealand, 4–2 in the final.

Since his competitive career began in 1985, Logan has played nearly 2700 tournament games, compiling a winning percentage of 69.5%, and earning around $103,000 in prize money.

== Mathematics ==
Logan completed his postdoctoral work at McGill University between 2002 through 2003. From 2003 to 2005, he worked in England. From 2008 to 2009, he was employed as a Quantitative Analyst at D. E. Shaw & Co. in New York City. He also worked for the Tutte Institute for Mathematics and Computing in Ottawa, Ontario, Canada.
