= Ganesh Asirvatham =

English academic

- Citizenship: Malaysian
- Occupation: English language teacher
- Known for: Competitive Scrabble, World Scrabble Championship runner-up (2007)
- Honours: Former Guinness World Record holder for most Scrabble opponents played simultaneously (21 wins out of 25 opponents on November 7, 2007)

Ganesh Asirvatham is an English language teacher from Klang, Selangor. He is a Scrabble player who represents Malaysia in international competition. He was the World Scrabble Championship 2007 runner-up. Ganesh was also the former Guinness World Record holder for the most Scrabble opponents played simultaneously by one challenger. The record took place on 7 November 2007 at the Infiniti Mall in Andheri, Mumbai, India. Ganesh beat 21 out of 25 opponents during his record attempt.

Ganesh achieved his best career WSC Rank 4 in 2005 and he had won awards in Malaysia NSC, Singapore Open and 2005 Indian Open. He is currently the top ranked player in the world according to WESPA.
