= Mark Nyman =

English Scrabble player (born 1966)

- Born: 14 October 1966 (age 60); London, England
- Occupation: Scrabble player
- Known for: World Scrabble Champion (1993)

Mark Nyman (born 14 October 1966) is an English professional Scrabble player originally from London, England and now a resident in Cheshire. At the end of 2002, he was rated 205 and was top-rated in the ABSP ratings. As at 7 September 2015 he is rated 200. His 27 consecutive tournament game wins is an ABSP record. He is most widely known as the first (and, until Craig Beevers' victory in 2014, only) British player to win the World Scrabble Championship, which he accomplished in 1993. He married in 2004 and has two children, Max and Kizzy.

Nyman played Canadian Joel Wapnick in the World Scrabble Championship 1993 final, in which he came back from 2–1 behind to win 3–2, including winning one game having been 174 behind. The two met again in the 1999 WSC final, and this time Wapnick was successful, winning a decider by 403 to 402.

Nyman has won a record twenty-two major UK tournaments, including:

1. The British Matchplay Scrabble Championship in 1992, 1996, 2002, 2009 and 2015
2. The National Scrabble Championship in 1998, 2001, 2002 and 2004
3. The ABSP Masters in 1995, 1997, 2000, 2003 and 2004.
4. Durham in 1988 and 1993.
5. Easter Matchplay in 1994.
6. Summer Matchplay in 1990 and 1991.
7. Winter Matchplay in 1991, 1992 and 1994.
8. The Brand's Crossword Game King's Cup in 1999.

Nyman was also the 2010 BEST Champion (British Elimination Scrabble Tournament).

Nyman made a return to competitive face to face Scrabble after the pandemic in 2021 & won the 2021 Malta International Open (MISO13).

He returns to Malta in November to defend his title. The event is being held at the Vivaldi Golden Tulip hotel in St Julians, Malta.

Nyman produced the British game show Countdown from 1990 to 2002 and made many appearances as an on-screen adjudicator. He had appeared on the show as a contestant, recording his first performances, at the age of 16, in 1983. In 1984, he was the programme's first 'Champion of Champions'.
