= World Scrabble Championship 2011 =

- 12 October 2011 – 16 October 2011
- Winner: Nigel Richards (Scrabble)
- Number of players: 106
- Location: Warsaw, Poland
- Sponsor: Mattel

The World Scrabble Championship 2011 was held in the Hilton Hotel, Warsaw, Poland, from 12 October to 16 October 2011. The format was a 34-round preliminary tournament and a best-of-five final. The top two players after the preliminary tournament, Nigel Richards and Andrew Fisher, played a best-of-five final for the top prize and the title of World Scrabble Champion 2011. There were 114 places allocated to competitors from around the world, with 106 players eventually competing.

== Results ==
The winner was Nigel Richards of New Zealand who defeated Andrew Fisher of Australia with three games to two in the best-of-five finals. Richards set the record for being the first two-time World Champion. He repeated this success, winning for a third time in 2013.

Richards won the first game 489–422. Bingos from Fisher included BINGERS and INTERWAR. Bingos from Richards were zENAIDAS, ACEROLA and MOLTERs.

Fisher won the second game with 520–406. Fisher bingoed GONDELAY while Richards struggled with a rack AAAEIIS. Richards had the bingo SOSATIE but there was no available spot. Later in the game, he played RETARDS, which was then replied by Fisher's OUTSPAN. Towards the end of the game, Richards played INSULAR for 83 points, which was again replied, with NEEDIER for 81 points.

At the end of Game 2 of the best-of five finals, both players had 1 win.

Richards pulled one back in the third game, 464–359. He had 4 bingos: DAROGHAS (63), UNFANNEd (64), TOLARJEV (90) and PAROdIES (72) compared to Fisher's only bingo of BOUGHTEN for 67 points.

Game 4 went to Fisher with 562–420 despite him having racks such as AAAABEE and AAAEEIO. Richards' ANGRIeST (70) was replied with JEEZ (81) and his EQUID (75) was immediately replied with TALLIED (79)

At the end of Game 4 of the finals, both players had 2 wins. It was an intense competition between the two.

The fifth game saw Richards take the title of World Champion, winning clearly with 476–333. It was a close game until Richards got OMNIFIED for 95 points, giving him a 100-point lead over Fisher. He then sealed the win with URAnITEs across four hooks for 88 points.

=== Final standings ===
Position	Name	Country	Win–loss	Spread	Prize (USD)
1	Richards, Nigel	WSC Runner-Up	25–9	+2008	20,000
2	Fisher, Andrew	Australia	23–11	+1521	10,000
3	Nemitrmansuk, Pakorn	World Champion	22–12	+1695	5,000
4	Wiegand, David	United States	22–12	+1555	4,000
5	May, Christopher	Australia	22–12	+1022	3,000
6	Smitheram, Brett	England	22–12	+949	2,500
7	Panyasophonlert, Komol	Thailand	22–12	+939	1,750
8	Gallen, Paul	Northern Ireland	21½–12½	+638	1,500
9	Adam Logan	Canada	21–13	+939	1,250
10	Richards, Alastair	Australia	21–13	+871	1,000
11	Beevers, Craig	England	21–13	+696	
12	Lipe, Chris	United States	21–13	+331	
13	Boys, David	Canada	21–13	+38	
14	Nicholson, Mikki	England	20–14	+1480	
15	Nyman, Mark	England	20–14	+1321	
16	Thevenot, Geoff	United States	20–14	+842	
17	Wee, Ming Hui Hubert	Singapore	20–14	+773	
18	Gipson, Helen	Scotland	20–14	+533	
19	Scott, Neil	Scotland	20–14	+448	
20	Allan, Paul	England	20–14	+311	
21	Rio, Odette Carmina	Philippines	20–14	+39	
22	Siriwangso, Marut	Thailand	20–14	+24	
23	Sulaiman, Mohammad	United Arab Emirates	19½–14½	+569	
24	Chong, Aaron	Malaysia	19–15	+1097	
25	Mackay, Lewis	England	19–15	+845	
26	Warner, Howard	New Zealand	19–15	+619	
27	Hovelmeier, Trevor Mark	South Africa	19–15	+546	
28	Holden, Stewart	Northern Ireland	19–15	+514	
29	Joel Sherman	United States	19–15	+380	
30	Simmons, Allan	Scotland	19–15	+267	
31	Kougi, Peter	Australia	19–15	+237	
32	Okulicz, Edward	Australia	19–15	-105	
33	Toh, Weibin	Singapore	19–15	-156	
34	Craig, Joanne	New Zealand	18½–15½	+765	
35	Wapnick, Joel	Canada	18½–15½	+635	
36	Delicata, David	Malta	18½–15½	-144	
37	Kenas, Mark	United States	18½–15½	-346	
38	Whitmarsh, Bradley	United States	18–16	+573	
39	Fernando, Naween Tharanga	Australia	18–16	+545	
40	Grover, Udayan	India	18–16	+384	
41	Rosin, Sam	United States	18–16	+350	
42	Leah, Tony	Canada	18–16	+182	
43	Kramer, Jim	United States	18–16	+69	
44	Rodrigues, Sherwin	India	18–16	+40	
45	Yeo, Kien Hung	Malaysia	18–16	-206	
46	Saldanha, Dean	Canada	18–16	-421	
47	Thorogood, Blue	New Zealand	18–16	-465	
48	Benedict, Nathan	United States	17½–16½	+764	
49	Sim, Tony	Singapore	17½–16½	+32	
50	O'Laughlin, John	United States	17–17	+785	
51	Martin, Edward	England	17–17	+496	
52	Saldanha, Dielle	Canada	17–17	+448	
53	Nderitu, Patrick Gitonga	Kenya	17–17	+390	
54	Placca, Chrys	Ghana	17–17	+313	
55	Dominiczak, Rafal	Poland	17–17	+308	
56	Halsall, Trevor	Australia	17–17	+279	
57	Weatherhead, Feargal	Ireland	17–17	+248	
58	Gillam, Simon	Scotland	17–17	+22	
59	Romany, Rodney	Trinidad and Tobago	17–17	-75	
60	Edwards, Calum	England	17–17	-300	
60	Litunya, Patrick	Kenya	17–17	-300	
62	Koenig, David	United States	17–17	-383	
63	Bowman, Brian	United States	16½–17½	+724	
64	Cree, Chris	United States	16½–17½	+47	
65	Carter, Gerald	Thailand	16½–17½	-280	
66	Robertshaw, Phil	England	16–18	+1268	
67	Brousson, Theresa	Malta	16–18	+785	
68	Itthi-Aree, Chollapat	Thailand	16–18	+444	
69	Purnomo, Ricky	Singapore	16–18	+414	
70	Ker, Jen Ho	World Youth Champion	16–18	+407	
71	Cohen, Evan	Israel	16–18	+234	
72	Ball, Nick	Canada	16–18	+190	
73	Cohen, Laurie	United States	16–18	+133	
74	Hirai, Keiichiro	Japan	16–18	+85	
75	Webb, David	England	16–18	+7	
76	Gabriel, Marty	United States	16–18	+3	
77	Koowirat, Thacha	Thailand	16–18	-14	
78	Wanniarachchi, Lakshan	Sri Lanka	16–18	-39	
79	Early, Dylan	South Africa	16–18	-110	
80	Green, Neil	Wales	16–18	-143	
81	Bullock, Orlet	Barbados	16–18	-447	
82	Iqbal, Wajid	Pakistan	16–18	-585	
83	Gruzd, Steven	South Africa	16–18	-606	
84	Usakiewicz, Wojciech	Poland	16–18	-656	
85	Williams, Gareth	Wales	16–18	-666	
86	Khongthanarat, Charnrit	Thailand	16–18	-738	
87	Srichawla, Daniel	Thailand	16–18	-1156	
88	Butler, Lynne	New Zealand	15½–18½	-798	
89	Wieckowski, Zbigniew	Poland	15–19	+233	
90	Landau, Naomi	Israel	15–19	+148	
91	Manase, Joshua Otieno	Kenya	15–19	-213	
92	Golding, Andrew	Canada	15–19	-248	
93	Pieta, Bartosz	Poland	15–19	-318	
94	Anthonius, Ferdy	Indonesia	15–19	-501	
95	Siddiqui, Irfan	Bahrain	14–20	+135	
96	Andersson, Gunnar	Sweden	13–21	-1194	
97	Pantis, Mihai	Romania	12–22	-391	
98	Fernandes, Marie	Oman	12–22	-506	
99	Reshamwala, Shakir	Kuwait	12–22	-528	
100	Bohbot, Herve	France	11–23	-1925	
101	Sosseh, Abraham Ebi	Gambia	10–24	-1332	
102	Dundas, Suzanne	Netherlands	10–24	-1876	
103	Berger, Ben	Germany, Federal Republic of	8–26	-3620	
104	Frydenlund, Anlaug	Norway	5–29	-4457	
105	Rodr, Tomas	Czech Republic	3–31	-4584	
106	Pastucha, Ivan	Slovakia	1–33	-6100	

- FINALS:
- Game 1: Richards 489 – Fisher 422
- Game 2: Fisher 520 – Richards 406
- Game 3: Richards 464 – Fisher 359
- Game 4: Fisher 562 – Richards 420
- Game 5: Richards 476 – Fisher 333

== Missing tile incident ==
In a round seven game between Edward Martin and Chollapat Itthi-Aree, Martin discovered a tile (G) missing at the end of play. (Since players typically bag the letters from a laid-out 10-by-10 grid from which a missing letter would be obvious, it is not normally possible to start a game with an incorrect number of letters, although using a 9-by-11 grid by mistake could mask a missing tile). The tournament director ruled that the letter be replaced, and Martin won the game 402–401. This caused some embarrassment to Martin and hard feelings among the Thai contingent, and it was widely reported that Chollapat Itthi-Aree had suggested that Martin be strip searched, but another reporter states that Chollapat did not make such a suggestion.
