= Association of British Scrabble Players =

The Association of British Scrabble Players oversees competitive Scrabble in the UK. It was formed in 1987 by agreement with J. W. Spear & Sons, the game's trademark owner, who were subsequently bought out by Mattel Inc. in 1993. It currently has around 600 members.

The ABSP controls a rating system containing the names of over 2,000 people who have played in Scrabble tournaments around the country. The Association also maintains a calendar of these events, handles publicity for them and many other Scrabble-related events and actively pursues sponsorship and the development of tournament Scrabble in the UK.

The honorary president of the Association is Gyles Brandreth, who founded the first British National Scrabble Championship in 1971 and has taken a keen interest in the game ever since. Former ABSP Chairman Allan Simmons is a prolific Scrabble author and the ABSP website was formerly maintained by Countdown series champion Stewart Holden, who previously held the post of publicity officer for the association.

The current ABSP chairperson is Mike Whiteoak.
