= Dave Wiegand =

American Scrabble player (born 1974)

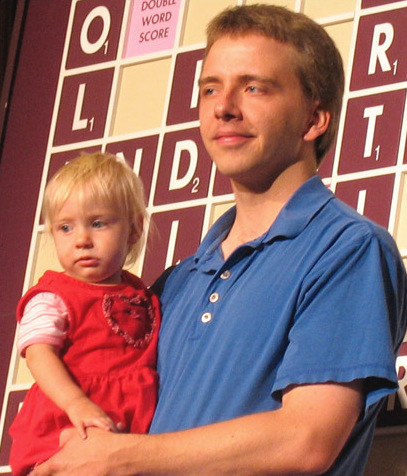
- Wiegand in 2005
- Born: July 22, 1974 (age 52); Lincoln, Nebraska
- Education: Reed College
- Occupation: Professional Scrabble player
- Mother: Sylvia Wiegand

Dave Wiegand (born July 22, 1974) is an American Scrabble player who won the National Scrabble Championship in 2005 and 2009.

Wiegand placed second in the same event in 1994 and third in 2000. He also finished eighth (of 102 competitors) in the World Scrabble Championship 2005. Since his career began in 1985, he has played over 4,700 tournament games, winning more than two-thirds of his games and has earned over $135,000 in prize money, ranking fifth among all players.

In the 2009 NSC, Wiegand defeated defending champion and top seed Nigel Richards in the tournament's final two games to earn his second national title.

== Personal life ==
Wiegand was born on July 22, 1974, in Lincoln, Nebraska to professors Roger and Sylvia Wiegand. He attended Reed College in Portland, Oregon, where he graduated in 1995 with a B.A. in mathematics. He works as a mortgage underwriter and lives with his wife and two children in Portland, Oregon.
