= David Eldar =

Australian poker and Scrabble player (born 1989)

- Born: 26 September 1989 (age 37)
- Known for: Scrabble World Champion (2017; 2023)
- Nickname: Deldar182

European Poker Tour
- Title: None
- Final table: 1
- Money finishes: 2

David Eldar (born 26 September 1989) is an Australian Scrabble player and pro-amateur poker player who specializes in Omaha hold 'em. He is the World Scrabble Champion of 2017, sweeping Harshan Lamabadusuriya 3–0 in the final, and 2023, again beating Lamabadusuriya by a score of 4–3.

In 2023, Eldar became the then second player to win multiple World Scrabble Championships, besides Nigel Richards, who has six wins.

Eldar grew up in Melbourne and attended the King David School in Armadale. He is Jewish, with him describing himself as an "atheist, progressive Jew". His mother is Australian and his father is Israeli.

== Scrabble ==
His Scrabble achievements include:

Youth/Regional

- World Youth Scrabble Champion 2006
- Australian National Champion (2007, 2013, 2024)
- Victorian State Champion 2003
- Runner-up Australian Masters (2005, 2006, 2007)
- 11th Place World Scrabble Championship 2005
- 11th Place World Scrabble Championship 2007
- 2008 Causeway Challenge Champion

Open

- North American Scrabble Championship 2016 Collins Division Winner (US$2,500)
- World Scrabble Championship 2017 Winner (£7,000)
- World Scrabble Championship 2023 Winner (US$10,000)
- 2026 Causeway Challenge Champion (US$10,000)

== Poker ==
Eldar plays under the alias Deldar182 on PokerStars and has earned over $1,800,000, as of April 2018.

Eldar finished 5th in the 2009 European High Roller Championship No Limit Hold'em event, winning $181,450. As of 2018, his total live tournament cashes exceed $200,000.
