= List of tournament Scrabble players =

This list of tournament Scrabble players includes people who have played Scrabble at the tournament level and have an article on English Wikipedia.

== Players ==
Name	Country	First tournament year	Notes
Will Anderson	United States	2009	2017 National Scrabble Championship winner (NWL)
Ganesh Asirvatham	Malaysia	1998	2007 World Scrabble Championship runner-up; former Guinness World Record holder for playing the greatest number of simultaneous Scrabble games (2007)
Moiz Ullah Baig	Pakistan	2012	2013 World Youth Scrabble Championships winner; 2018 World Junior Scrabble Championships winner
Conrad Bassett-Bouchard	United States	2004	2014 National Scrabble Championship winner (NWL)
Craig Beevers	United Kingdom	2009	2014 World Scrabble Championship winner
Hervé Bohbot	France	2003	
Germain Boulianne	Canada	2003	
David Boys	Canada	1985	1995 World Scrabble Championship winner; 2003 Canadian National Scrabble Championship winner
Brian Cappelletto	United States	1985	1991 World Scrabble Championship runner-up; 2001 World Scrabble Championship winner; 1998 National Scrabble Championship winner; 2008 and 2010 National Scrabble Championship runner-up
Barry Chamish	Israel	1980s	
Evan Cohen	Israel	1991	
Michel Duguet	France	1982	
Joe Edley	United States	1978	1980, 1992, and 2000 National Scrabble Championship winner
David Eldar	Australia	2005	2006 World Youth Scrabble Championships winner; 2016 North American Scrabble Championship winner (CSW); 2017 World Scrabble Championship winner; 2023 World Scrabble Championship winner
Stefan Fatsis	United States	1997	
Robert Felt	United States	1982	1990 National Scrabble Championship winner; 1991 National Scrabble Championship runner-up
Andrew Fisher	Australia	1991	
Darryl Francis	United Kingdom	1999	
Roxane Gay	United States	2011	
David Gibson	United States	1986	
Helen Gipson	United Kingdom	1999	
Matt Graham	United States	1991	1997 World Scrabble Championship runner-up
Eric Harshbarger	United States	2001	
Deen Hergott	Canada	2008	
Stewart Holden	United Kingdom	2003	
Wellington Jighere	Nigeria	2002	
Cheryl Kagan	United States	2008	
W. P. Kinsella	Canada	1998	
Jim Kramer	United States	1983	2006 US Scrabble Open winner
Harshan Lamabadusuriya	United Kingdom	1999	
Adam Logan	Canada	1985	
Michael McKenna	Australia	2013	2012 World Youth Scrabble Championships winner
Mack Meller	United States	2010	
Andrea Carla Michaels	United States	1990	
Antonin Michel	France	1987	
Peter Morris	United States	1980	1989 National Scrabble Championship winner; 1991 World Scrabble Championship winner
Pakorn Nemitrmansuk	Thailand	1992	
Rita Norr	United States	1980	1987 National Scrabble Championship winner and only woman to ever win a national championship in North America
Mark Nyman	United Kingdom	1983	1993 World Scrabble Championship winner; 1999 World Scrabble Championship runner-up; 2016 World Scrabble Championship runner-up
Annette Obrestad	United States	2022	
Trip Payne	United States	1995	
Paul Phillips	United States	2002	
Christian Pierre	Belgium	1990s	
Sal Piro	United States	1992	
Chris Reslock	United States	1979	
Nigel Richards	New Zealand	1997	
Chrystal Rose	United Kingdom	2008	
Eric Rosen	United States	2024	
Joel Sherman	United States	1988	1995 World Scrabble Championship runner-up; 1997 World Scrabble Championship winner; 1998 Brand's Crossword Game King's Cup winner; 2002 National Scrabble Championship winner; 2018 North American Scrabble Championship winner (NWL)
David Shulman	United States	1977	
Allan Simmons	United Kingdom	1988	
Brett Smitheram	United Kingdom	1999	2016 World Scrabble Championship winner
Josh Sokol	Canada	2005	
Clive Spate	United Kingdom	1991	
Panupol Sujjayakorn	Thailand	2001	2003 World Scrabble Championship winner; 2005 Brand's Crossword Game King's Cup winner; 2005 National Scrabble Championship runner-up
Dario De Toffoli	Italy		
Joel Wapnick	Canada	1977	1983 National Scrabble Championship winner; 1993 World Scrabble Championship runner-up; 1999 World Scrabble Championship winner; 2001 World Scrabble Championship runner-up
Robert Watson	United States	1979	1988 National Scrabble Championship winner
Dave Wiegand	United States	1985	
Winter	United States	2003	
Trey Wright	United States	1993	2004 National Scrabble Championship winner
