= English-language Scrabble =

Scrabble variation

English-language Scrabble is the original version of the popular word-based board game invented in 1938 by US architect Alfred Mosher Butts, who based the game on English letter distribution in The New York Times. The Scrabble variant most popular in English is standard match play, where two players compete over a series of games. Duplicate Scrabble is not popular in English, and High score Scrabble is no longer practised.

Although English is a worldwide language, the official list of allowable words and some tournament rules differ between territories.

== North America ==
The preeminent Scrabble association in North America is NASPA Games (formerly North American Scrabble Players Association), which has sanctioned official clubs and tournaments since 2009, taking this role over from the National Scrabble Association.

Tournaments range from one-day tournaments of less than 10 rounds to the North American Scrabble Championship, which lasts 5 days and 31 rounds. Larger tournaments can also carry significant prize money. The official lexicon is the NASPA Word List. When a player challenges a word, if the word is not in the lexicon it is removed from the board with a score of zero. If the word is in the lexicon, the player who challenged the word loses a turn.

Scrabble clubs meet on a regular basis, usually weekly or biweekly at the same venue. Players usually play a smaller number of games than they would play at a tournament.

== United Kingdom ==
Match-play Scrabble is also practised at tournaments and clubs in the UK. Tournaments follow a similar structure to American ones, usually at least six games. Weekend tournaments where players play 12 to 16 games are not uncommon. The Association of British Scrabble Players sanctions official tournaments with official ratings, which range from about 200 to about 50. The official lexicon is Collins Scrabble Words (CSW19). In contrast to American tournaments, players do not lose a turn if they challenge a valid word. Instead the other player gains points, usually five per challenged word. This means more words are challenged than in North American play.

== Hong Kong ==
There are only Scrabble competitions for primary and secondary school students in Hong Kong. Inter-School competitions are held by companies and organisations such as Mattel and Broadlearning. In May 2015, Hong Kong Student Scrabble Players Association organised the Inter-School Scrabble Championship. Some schools also organise invitational Scrabble competitions every year.

== Smaller countries ==
Many countries have small English-language Scrabble associations. 23 countries have been represented at the World Scrabble Championship, including some where English is not an official language, such as Romania, Thailand and France. Other countries that do not use the Latin script also may play in English if the language is not suitable for Scrabble, such as Japan.

The largest tournament in the world, by number of players, is Thailand's English-language Brand's Crossword Game King's Cup, which draws as many as 8,000 players.

== Records ==
- High game (OSPD) – 830 by Michael Cresta (MA), October 12, 2006. Cresta defeated Wayne Yorra 830–490.
- High game (OSW) – 793 by Peter Preston (UK), 1999.
- High game (SOWPODS) – 850 by Toh Weibin (Singapore) to Rik Kennedy's (Northern Ireland) 259, 2012. The game broke records for highest score, and highest spread in an official tournament, and featured two triple-triples: BEAUXITE for 275, and ALLiGATE for 122.
- High combined score (OSPD) – 1320 (830–490) by Michael Cresta and Wayne Yorra, in a Lexington, MA, club, 2006.
- High combined score (SOWPODS) – 1157 by Phillip Edwin-Mugisha (Uganda) and Vannitha Balasingam (Malaysia), at the 2009 World Scrabble Championship.
- Highest losing score (OSPD) – 552 by Stefan Rau (CT) to Keith Smith's (TX) 582, Round 12 of the 2008 Dallas Open.
- Highest tie game (OSPD) – 502–502 by John Chew and Zev Kaufman at a 1997 Toronto Club tournament.
- Highest opening move score (OSPD) – BEZIQUE 124 by Sam Kantimathi (CA) in Portland, OR Tournament in 1992. The highest possible legal score on a first turn is MUZJIKS, 128.
- Highest opening move score (SOWPODS) BEZIQUE 124 Joan Rosenthal. BEZIQUE 124 Sally Martin
- Highest single play (OSPD) – QUIXOTRY 365 by Michael Cresta (MA), 2006.
- Highest single play (SOWPODS) – CAZIQUES 392 Karl Khoshnaw.
- Highest Average Score (two-day tournament) (OSPD) – 467 by Joel Sherman over 11 rounds; Wisconsin Dells, WI 1997.
