= World Scrabble Championship 1993 =

- 27 August 1993 – 30 August 1993
- Winner: Mark Nyman
- Number of players: 64
- Location: New York
- Sponsor: Hasbro

The World Scrabble Championship 1993 was the second World Scrabble Championship. The winner was Mark Nyman, representing the United Kingdom, as this was before the countries of the UK were given individual representation.

The first 15 rounds used modified Swiss pairing. After this, players #1 and #3 and players #2 and #4 played a best-of-five semifinal to determine the finalists while the remaining 64 players played three more games. The semifinals were followed by a best-of-five finals while the two other semifinalists played a best-of-five match to determine third and fourth place.

The first game of the finals looked like it would go Nyman's way when he bingoed with MUTAGENIC from an MU on his second play and then challenged off Wapnick's DOX. But Nyman later played a phony of his own (VERGINGS) and then got stuck with the Q while Wapnick drew both blanks and won by 38.

In game two, Wapnick drew both blanks again and won by almost 100 points, aided by the 102-point DYSURIC.

Game three was tight until Nyman played two successive bingos and went on to a 530-victory. The fourth game again started close, until Wapnick scored 212 points on three successive turns (though he missed a 107-point bingo in the process) and took a seemingly insurmountable 174-point lead. A few turns later, Wapnick had the opportunity to take a 212-point lead with HELMING, but the play would have opened a triple-triple line with both blanks unseen so he opted for a more conservative 41-point play and still led by 170. Against the odds, Nyman came back with a 50-point X play and bingos with both blanks and went on to a devastating 9-point victory.

The key point in the final game came when Wapnick, holding a blank, played STUM instead of SMUR (of which he was unsure). Nyman then bingoed with BEDAWIN setting up an S-hook on the O column. Unable to play a bingo ending in S because of his STUM play, Wapnick instead played GROANERs when he could have blocked the O column with ORANGiER. Sure enough, Nyman drew an S and played VELURES for 91 points then coasted to an easy win to become the first non-North American to win the world championship.

== Complete Results ==
Position	Name	Country	Win–loss	Spread	Prize (USD)
1	Nyman, Mark	England	18–7	+779	10,000
2	Wapnick, Joel	Canada	17–8	+1200	6,000
3	Gibson, David	United States	16–9	+503	3,000
4	Williams, Gareth	Wales	15–10	+404	1,500
5	Saldanha, Allan	United Kingdom	13–5	+951	900
6	Felt, Robert	United States	12–6	+642	750
7	Sigley, Michael	New Zealand	12–6	+467	600
8	Schoenman, Bob	United States	12–6	+131	500
9	Spate, Clive	United Kingdom	11–7	+530	400
10	Sherman, Joel	United States	11–7	+526	300
11	Logan, Adam	Canada	11–7	+477	250
12	Morris, Peter	United States	11–7	+421	200
13	Nelkon, Phil	United Kingdom	11–7	+336	175
14	Lund, Richie	United States	11–7	+224	150
15	Odom, Lisa	United States	11–7	+221	125
16	Catto, John	United Kingdom	10–8	+557	100
17	Greenspan, Randy	United States	10–5	+541	
18	Edley, Joe	United States	10–5	+495	
19	Dennis, Di	England	10–5	+399	
20	Thorogood, Blue	New Zealand	10–5	+326	
21	Byers, Russell	England	10–5	+215	
22	Day, Darrell	United States	10–5	+204	
23	Lipton, Bob	United States	10–5	+196	
24	Grant, Jeff	New Zealand	10–5	+188	
25	Kaufman, Zev	Canada	10–5	+26	
26	Ploysangngam, Amnuay	Thailand	10–5	-433	
27	Nderitu, Patrick Gitonga	Kenya	9–6	+743	
28	Graham, Matt	United States	9–6	+319	
29	Jaruwan, Ong-Arj	Thailand	9–6	+274	
30	Cappelletto, Brian	United States	9–6	+272	
31	Ballard, Nick	United States	9–6	+168	
32	Elbourne, Peter	Malta	9–6	+52	
33	Warusawitharana, Missaka	Sri Lanka	9–6	+34	
34	Luebkemann, John	United States	9–6	-141	
35	Sim, Tony	Singapore	9–6	-164	
36	Finley, Peter	England	9–6	-230	
37	Nevarez, Johnny	United States	9–6	-293	
38	Gruzd, Steven	South Africa	9–6	-362	
39	Daniel, Robin Pollock	Canada	8–7	+463	
40	Rosenthal, Joan	Australia	8–7	+62	
41	Khoshnaw, Karl	Kurdistan-Iraq	8–7	-34	
42	Filio, Roland	Philippines	8–7	-48	
43	Cohen, Evan	Israel	8–7	-113	
44	Grayson, John	Wales	8–7	-177	
45	Wright, Geoff	Australia	8–7	-379	
46	Chishty, Ishtiaq	Saudi Arabia	8–7	-482	
47	Heaton, Ken	United Kingdom	8–7	-737	
48	Raychbart, Paloma	Israel	7½–7½	-259	
49	Onani, Magwanga	Kenya	7½–7½	-391	
50	Butler, Lynne	New Zealand	7–8	+190	
51	Neuberger, Jim	United States	7–8	-123	
52	Clenaghan, Nuala	Ireland	7–8	-245	
53	Benjamin, Larry	South Africa	7–8	-331	
54	Lerman, Jerry	United States	7–8	-424	
55	Holgate, John	Australia	7–8	-617	
56	Jackman, Bob	Australia	6½–8½	-525	
57	Filio, Candido	Philippines	6½–8½	-588	
58	Norr, Rita	United States	6–9	-372	
59	Koroda, Kunihiko	Japan	6–9	-913	
60	Meghan, Eileen	Éire	6–9	-950	
61	Abdullah, Raja Fuadin	Malaysia	6–9	-1205	
62	Alimohamed, Amirali	United Arab Emirates	5–10	-1237	
63	Roff, Lynn	South Africa	5–10	-867	
64	Yeh, Winnie	Hong Kong	3–12	-896	

- Semifinals
- Mark Nyman 3 – David Gibson 2
- Joel Wapnick 3 – Gareth Williams 2
- Consolation Match
- David Gibson 3 – Gareth Williams 2
- Finals
- Game 1: Wapnick 446 – Nyman 408
- Game 2: Wapnick 443 – Nyman 357
- Game 3: Nyman 530 – Wapnick 374
- Game 4: Nyman 469 – Wapnick 460
- Game 5: Nyman 417 – Wapnick 369
