= World Scrabble Championship 1997 =

- 20 November 1997 – 24 November 1997
- Winner: Joel Sherman
- Number of players: 80
- Location: Washington, D.C.
- Sponsor: Hasbro

The World Scrabble Championship 1997 was the fourth World Scrabble Championship. The winner was Joel Sherman of the United States.

== Format ==
The World Scrabble Championship 1997 was held in the Stouffer Renaissance Mayflower Hotel, Washington, D.C., and was the second to be held in the United States. Eighty players played a Swiss tournament of twenty-one games each, with each player playing seven games on each of the first three days. The two top players from this tournament then played a best-of-five game final to decide who would be World Scrabble Champion 1997.

Prize money was provided by the Milton Bradley Company, owned by the tournament's sponsor Hasbro, to a total value of $50,100. The winner received $25,000, the runner-up $10,000 and the remainder of the top twenty players received prizes down to $150.

This was the first World Championship to have featured a live web site, a copy of which is now archived at the main WSC web site.

== Results ==
After the initial Swiss tournament, the top two players were Joel Sherman (16 wins, winning spread +829) and Matt Graham (15 wins, winning spread +993). Notably, all the top four players were representing the United States. This was particularly surprising since the WSC uses the SOWPODS wordlist, which includes many words not present in the traditional American wordlist, TWL 98.

Graham took the first game of the finals 409–334 but lost a 387–363 squeaker in the second after missing BOWNED.

In game three, Graham made another error when he played HERB instead of BERTH and Sherman took another close game, 419–405.

In game four, Sherman got off to a big lead and began shutting down the board. Graham took a chance on FLEXERS for 101 points, but Sherman successfully challenged it off. Graham drew a rack full of consonants. Sherman won the game and was crowned World Scrabble Champion, after losing in the final two years earlier.

== Complete results ==
Position	Name	Country	Win–loss	Spread	Prize (USD)
1	Sherman, Joel	United States	16–5	+829	25,000
2	Graham, Matt	United States	15–6	+993	10,000
3	Edley, Joe	United States	15–6	+915	5,000
4	Felt, Robert	United States	14–7	+814	3,000
5	Nyman, Mark	England	14–7	+741	2,000
6	Boyd, Kendall	New Zealand	14–7	+401	1,000
7	Byers, Russell	England	14–7	+396	800
8	Bhandarkar, Akshay	Bahrain	14–7	+353	600
9	Logan, Adam	Canada	13–8	+1064	400
10	Cappelletto, Brian	United States	13–8	+946	300
11	Boys, David	Canada	13–8	+935	250
12	Acton, David	England	13–8	+517	250
13	Grant, Jeff	New Zealand	13–8	+478	250
14	Saldanha, Allan	United Kingdom	13–8	+234	250
15	Tiekert, Ron	United States	13–8	-27	250
16	Okosagah, Sammy	Nigeria	12–9	+816	150
17	Nderitu, Patrick Gitonga	Kenya	12–9	+750	150
18	Warusawitharana, Missaka	Sri Lanka	12–9	+709	150
19	Fernando, Naween Tharanga	Sri Lanka	12–9	+588	150
20	Holgate, John	Australia	12–9	+556	150
21	Downer, Penny	United Kingdom	12–9	+408	
22	Fisher, Andrew	United Kingdom	12–9	+382	
23	Thobani, Shafique	Kenya	12–9	+85	
24	Cleary, Paul Stephen	Australia	12–9	+82	
25	Ndungu, Stanley Njoroge	Kenya	12–9	+16	
26	Williams, Gareth	Wales	12–9	-179	
27	Spate, Clive	United Kingdom	11½–9½	+344	
28	Awowade, Femi	England	11–10	+711	
29	Onyeonwu, Ifeanyi	Nigeria	11–10	+613	
30	Yawo, Anaga Takyi	Ghana	11–10	+545	
31	Perrins, Esther	Australia	11–10	+377	
32	Pui, Cheng Wui	Malaysia	11–10	+305	
33	Sukhumrattanaporn, Charnwit	Thailand	11–10	+94	
34	Gruzd, Steven	South Africa	11–10	+63	
35	Addo, Joshua	Ghana	11–10	+48	
36	Wapnick, Joel	Canada	11–10	+27	
37	Carter, Gerald	Thailand	11–10	-439	
38	Daniel, Robin Pollock	Canada	11–10	-503	
39	Hahn, Albert	Canada	11–10	-719	
40	Sigley, Michael	New Zealand	10½–10½	+516	
41	Webb, Mark	England	10½–10½	+127	
42	Klaphajone, Jakkrit	Thailand	10–11	+606	
43	Blom, Roger	Australia	10–11	+520	
44	Hersom, Randy	United States	10–11	+511	
45	Mead, Jeremiah	United States	10–11	+507	
46	Schonbrun, Lester	United States	10–11	+379	
47	Geary, Jim	United States	10–11	+218	
48	Khan, Rashid Ateeq	Pakistan	10–11	-333	
49	Luebkemann, John	United States	10–11	-400	
50	Elbourne, Peter	Malta	10–11	-435	
51	Grayson, John	Wales	10–11	-447	
52	Khoshnaw, Karl	Kurdistan-Iraq	10–11	-582	
53	Jonah, J.J.	Israel	10–11	-645	
54	Chinnaiyah, Suresh	Sri Lanka	9½–11½	+124	
55	Mensah, Edem Kafui	Ghana	9½–11½	-296	
56	Butler, Lynne	New Zealand	9½–11½	-745	
57	Lao, Armando	Philippines	9–12	+246	
58	Lipton, Bob	United States	9–12	+12	
59	Quek, Sim Ho	Singapore	9–12	-284	
60	Raychbart, Paloma	Israel	9–12	-351	
61	Lobo, Yvonne	Bahrain	9–12	-413	
62	Saldanha, Norbert	United Arab Emirates	9–12	-551	
63	Saliba, Mario	Malta	9–12	-586	
64	Davids, Gerald	South Africa	9–12	-643	
65	Tan, Kiat Hing Austin	Singapore	9–12	-769	
66	Nanavati, Jim	Canada	9–12	-964	
67	Ul-Haq, Assad	Qatar	8–13	+306	
68	Abdullah, Raja Fuadin	Malaysia	8–13	+137	
69	Salih, Sala Fadl Mohamed	Saudi Arabia	8–13	-47	
70	Pray, Linda Hazel	Oman	8–13	-234	
71	Chune, Albert	Trinidad and Tobago	8–13	-828	
72	Nakai, Ken	Japan	8–13	-865	
73	Clenaghan, Nuala	Ireland	8–13	-872	
74	Meghan, Eileen	Éire	8–13	-891	
75	Springer, Robert	France	8–13	-1097	
76	Mamadou, Wone	Kuwait	7–14	-755	
77	Paolella, Libero	Canada	7–14	-862	
78	Sandu, Dan Laurentiu	Romania	5–16	-1528	
79	Gibbons, Randall	Guyana	4–17	-913	
80	Nanayakkara, Harischandra	Seychelles	3–18	-2141	

=== Finals ===
- Game 1: Graham 409 – Sherman 334
- Game 2: Sherman 387 – Graham 363
- Game 3: Sherman 419 – Graham 405
- Game 4: Sherman 410 – Graham 324
