= Word Wars =

2004 American documentary film

- Directed by: Eric Chaikin; Julian Petrillo
- Produced by: Eric Chaikin
- Starring: Joe Edley; Matt Graham; Marlon Hill; Joel Sherman
- Cinematography: Laela Kilbourn
- Edited by: Conor O'Neill
- Music by: Thor Madsen
- Distributed by: 7th Art Releasing
- Release date: 2004
- Running time: 80 minutes
- Language: English

Word Wars: Tiles and Tribulations on the Scrabble Circuit is a 2004 American documentary film directed by Eric Chaikin and Julian Petrillo about competitive Scrabble. The film was an official selection at the 2004 Sundance film festival, had a 25-city theatrical run, was included as part of the Discovery Times Channel's "Screening Room" series, and was nominated for numerous awards, including a 2004 Documentary Emmy for "Best Artistic or Cultural Programming" and an International Documentary Association (IDA) Award. The film is distributed by 7th Art Releasing.

The film follows four players in the nine months leading up to the 2002 National Scrabble Championship, which was held in San Diego, California: Joe Edley, Matt Graham, Marlon Hill, and Joel Sherman. These players, as does Chaikin, also appear in Stefan Fatsis's book Word Freak. Fatsis and Chaikin are both tournament Scrabble players themselves.

== Soundtrack ==
- E Wolf & the Moneylenders – "Paralyzed" (Written by Chalkin & Haber)
- Your Mom – "The One" (Written by Your Mom)
- The Minutemen – "Do You Want New Wave (Or Do You Want the Truth)" (Written by Mike Watt)
- The Minutemen – "The Glory of Man" (Written by Mike Watt)
- Andrew Chaikin & Austin Willacy – "Across the Universe" (Written by John Lennon and Paul McCartney)
- Joel Sherman – "Across the Universe" (Written by John Lennon and Paul McCartney)
