= North American School Scrabble Championship =

Scrabble tournament for 3rd to 8th graders

The North American School Scrabble Championship, formerly the National School Scrabble Championship, is a Scrabble tournament for 3rd grade to 8th grade students, held annually in North America since 2003. Beginning in 2017 a high school division was added. This division features one-on-one play.

== History ==
In 2018, 3rd graders were allowed to compete for the first time. Prior to 2012, 5th graders were the youngest grade allowed to compete. The School Scrabble Championship uses the Official Scrabble Players Dictionary.

The competition is in tournament Scrabble play, in which teams of two play for 25 minutes with digital timers similar to those used in the board game of chess. The time limit was originally 22 minutes for each side until 2012 when the switch was made to coincide with the traditional times of the Adult Nationals. The team with the most wins is determined the winner. If there are multiple teams with the same number of wins, cumulative point spread is used to break the tie.

Matthew Silver of Connecticut became the first competitor to win two consecutive National School Scrabble Championship titles, in 2007 (with Aune Mitchell) and 2008 (with Logan Rosen). Matt Silver accumulated a 14–0 record in those two years. In 2009, for the first time ever, the event was won by a team of 5th graders, Andy Hoang and Erik Salgado of Salem Elementary in North Carolina. They were the last team to finish the tournament with an undefeated record (7–0) until 2018, when the team of Jeffrey Pogue (CT) and Noah Slatkoff (ON) finished with a perfect 9–0 record. The champions finished 6–1 in 2010, 7–1 in 2011, 2012, 2013, 2014, 2015, and 2016, and 8–1 in 2017 and 2019.

The winners have often been invited to be on Good Morning America and Jimmy Kimmel Live!. The event has also received recognition from president Barack Obama and NBA superstar Shaquille O'Neal, who are advocates for the game themselves.

In 2012, Andy Hoang and Erik Salgado of North Carolina became the first team to win two NSSC titles, their first as 5th graders in 2009, and their second as 8th graders in 2012. In 2019, Jeffrey Pogue and Noah Slatkoff became the first team to win consecutive championships.

The 2013 NSSC was held in Washington D.C. 2013 marked the first time since 2009 that a previous champion did not compete. In 2010, 2011, 2012, and 2019 Andy Hoang, Erik Salgado, Bradley Robbins, Evan McCarthy, Jeffrey Pogue, and Noah Slatkoff were champions that returned. Andy Hoang and Erik Salgado and Jeffrey Pogue and Noah Slatkoff were the only ones to repeat during the streak, with Jeffrey Pogue and Noah Slatkoff being the first to win back-to-back championships.

With Jeffrey Pogue and Noah Slatkoff's win in 2019, Connecticut became the first state to hold 4 National titles: Connecticut players Matthew Silver (2007 and 2008), Aune Mitchell (2007), Logan Rosen (2008), and Jeffrey Pogue (2018 and 2019). California and North Carolina teams have won 3 National titles: California players Zach Ansell (2015 and 2017), Jem Burch (2016 and 2017), and Cooper Komatsu (2016); and North Carolina Players Andy Hoang (2009 and 2012), Erik Salgado (2009 and 2012), Kevin Bowerman (2013), and Raymond Gao (2013).

Canadian teams were permitted to compete in this event starting in 2010, and 2011 saw the first Canadian champions: Alex Li and Jackson Smylie from Ontario. In 2018 and 2019 Noah Slatkoff, also from Ontario, was champion (with Jeffrey Pogue from Connecticut).

In 2014, champion Thomas Draper became the first three-time finalist. The 2014 NASC was the first tournament to return to Providence since 2009. 2015 was the second year in a row where a bi-coastal team won the tournament and the fourth consecutive time where a team from North Carolina played in the final game. In 2018 the first U.S.-Canadian team won. Selected games from these tournaments were aired live with commentary on the internet.

In 2017, champions Zach Ansell and Jem Burch both won for the second time, but with different teammates. Zach won with Noah Kalus in 2015, and Jem won with Cooper Komatsu in 2016.

In 2019, Jeffrey Pogue and Noah Slatkoff became the first team to win two years consecutively, under the team name Rackmasters.

In 2017, High School and Challenge divisions were added to the event. The 2017 High School division winner was Kevin Bowerman (NC), who was champion (with Raymond Gao) in 2013; Challenge division winners were Audrey Benford (MD) and Dina Lacugna (CT).

== Past winners ==
| Year | Winner(s) | Runner(s)-Up | Location | Event Director | Winner's Prize | Total Prize Pool |
|---|---|---|---|---|---|---|
| 2026 | Tile Titans Andrew Wilen and Alan South | Pink Fluffy Unicorns Leonie Kalra and Lisette Kalra | Washington, DC | Kieran O'Connor | US$1,000 | US$5,000 |
| 2025 | Hazem Kahn and Nathan Lerlop (VA) | Theo Diamond and Tobey Lieberman | Washington, DC | Kieran O'Connor | US$1,000 | US$5,000 |
| 2024 | Nathanael Campos (CT) and Rishi Palicha Giezentanner (CT) | Milo Anderson (DC) and Nathan Lerlop (VA) | Washington, DC | Ben Greenwood | US$1,000 | US$5,000 |
| 2023 | Walden Giezentanner (MO) and Nathanael Campos (CT) | Nathan Lerlop (DC) and Milo Anderson (DC) | Washington, DC | Ben Greenwood | US$1,000 | US$2,500 |
| 2022 | Walden Giezentanner (MO) and Nathanael Campos (CT) | Gideon Brosowsky (DC) and Milo Anderson (DC) | Washington, DC | Ben Greenwood | US$1,000 | US$5,000 |
| 2019 | Jeffrey Pogue (CT) and Noah Slatkoff (ON) | Thomas Shundi (NC) and Archit Kalra (FL) | Philadelphia, PA | Ben Greenwood | US$3,000 | US$10,000+ |
| 2018 | Jeffrey Pogue (CT) and Noah Slatkoff (ON) | Knox Daniel and Logan Strzepek (VA) | Philadelphia, PA | Judy Cole and Jason Keller | US$10,000 | US$23,000 |
| 2017 | Zach Ansell and Jem Burch (CA) | Knox Daniel and Logan Strzepek (VA) | Foxborough, MA | Jason Keller | US$10,000 | US$20,500 |
| 2016 | Jem Burch and Cooper Komatsu (CA) | Matias Shundi and Javier Contreras (NC) | Foxborough, MA | John Chew | US$10,000 | US$20,500 |
| 2015 | Noah Kalus (NY) and Zach Ansell (CA) | Matias Shundi and Javier Contreras (NC) | Pawtucket, RI | John Chew | US$10,000 | US$20,000 |
| 2014 | Thomas Draper (NJ) and Jacob Sass (TX) | Jack Miklaucic and Nicholas Miklaucic (NC) | Providence, RI | John Chew | US$10,000 | US$20,000 |
| 2013 | Kevin Bowerman and Raymond Gao (NC) | Thomas Draper (NJ) and Sam Masling (DC) | Washington, DC | John Chew | US$10,000 | US$20,000 |
| 2012 | Andy Hoang and Erik Salgado (NC) | Thomas Draper and Nicholas Vasquez (NJ) | Orlando, FL | John Chew | US$10,000 | US$20,000 |
| 2011 | Alex Li and Jackson Smylie (ON) | Evan McCarthy and Bradley Robbins (NH) | Orlando, FL | John Chew | US$10,000 | US$20,000 |
| 2010 | Evan McCarthy and Bradley Robbins (NH) | Timothy Bryant and Kevin Rosenberg (NY) | Orlando, FL | Ben Greenwood | US$10,000 | US$20,000 |
| 2009 | Andy Hoang and Erik Salgado (NC) | Paolo Federico O'Murchu and Nicholas Vasquez (NJ) | Providence, RI | Ben Greenwood | US$10,000 | US$20,000 |
| 2008 | Logan Rosen and Matthew Silver (CT) | Dorian Hill and Joey Krafchick (GA) | Providence, RI | Ben Greenwood | US$5,000 | US$10,000 |
| 2007 | Aune Mitchell and Matthew Silver (CT) | Dorian Hill and Joey Krafchick (GA) | Providence, RI | Ben Greenwood | US$5,000 | |
| 2006 | Aaron Jacobs and Nathan Mendelsohn (MA) | | Boston, MA | Ben Greenwood | US$5,000 | US$9,250 |
| 2005 | Scott Cardone and Asif Rahman (OH) | | Boston, MA | Ben Greenwood | US$5,000 | |
| 2004 | Thomas Bao and Eric Johnston (CA) | | Boston, MA | Ben Greenwood and Joe Edley | US$5,000 | |
| 2003 | Nick Amphlett and John Ezekowitz (MA) | | Boston, MA | Ben (Loiterstein) Greenwood and Joe Edley | US$5,000 | |

== See also ==
- World Scrabble Championship
- World Youth Scrabble Championships
- Canadian Scrabble Championship
- Brand's Crossword Game King's Cup
- Scrabble Players Championship
