= High Score =

High Score or Hi Score may refer to:

- High score, the highest logged point value in a game
- High score Scrabble, a variant of the board game Scrabble
- A satirical term for a high kill count, usually used in the context of mass shootings

== Media ==
- Hi Score Girl, a Japanese manga series written and illustrated by Rensuke Oshikiri
- Hi Scores, an EP by Scottish electronic music duo Boards of Canada
- Hi-Score – The Best of Che Fu, the first hits collection released by New Zealand hip-hop/R&B male vocalist Che Fu
- High Score (TV series), a Netflix docuseries created by France Costrel
