= Scrabble Complete =

2002 video game

- Developer: Infogrames
- Publisher: Infogrames
- Platform: Microsoft Windows
- Release: September 25, 2002
- Genre: Puzzle game
- Modes: Single-player, Multiplayer

Scrabble Complete is a computer adaptation of the popular board game Scrabble by American studio Infogrames Initially released in September 2002 for Microsoft Windows, the game has received generally favorable reviews.

== Gameplay ==
The gameplay of Scrabble Complete is nearly identical to that of the board game. Like other computer adaptations of popular board games, Scrabble Complete has additional features which allow the game to be customized; Players have the ability to tilt the board in different directions to change the viewpoint of the game board. At the game menu, players can change the background, the board color and the music. The game offers support for the Official Scrabble Players Dictionary and a hint system for novice Scrabble players.

In addition to the main stand-alone mode, Scrabble Complete offers network play. There are also several educational word games, such as word riddles and anagram search, included with Scrabble Complete. Some copies of the game also include the 1997 Boggle computer game as a bonus.

== Reception ==
Reception to Scrabble Complete was generally favorable, with a 75.67% rating awarded by Gamerankings. GameSpot gave the game a score of 7.2, stating: "Scrabble Complete is basically just Scrabble, which, if you're a fan of the challenging board game it's based on, is a good thing."
