= NASPA =

NASPA may refer to:

- National Association of Student Personnel Administrators
- NASPA Games, a games organization formerly known as North American Scrabble Players Association
