= OWL2 =

OWL2 may refer to:

- Version 2 of the Web Ontology Language
- Version 2 of the Official Tournament and Club Word List for Scrabble
