= Mack Meller =

American Scrabble player (born 2000)

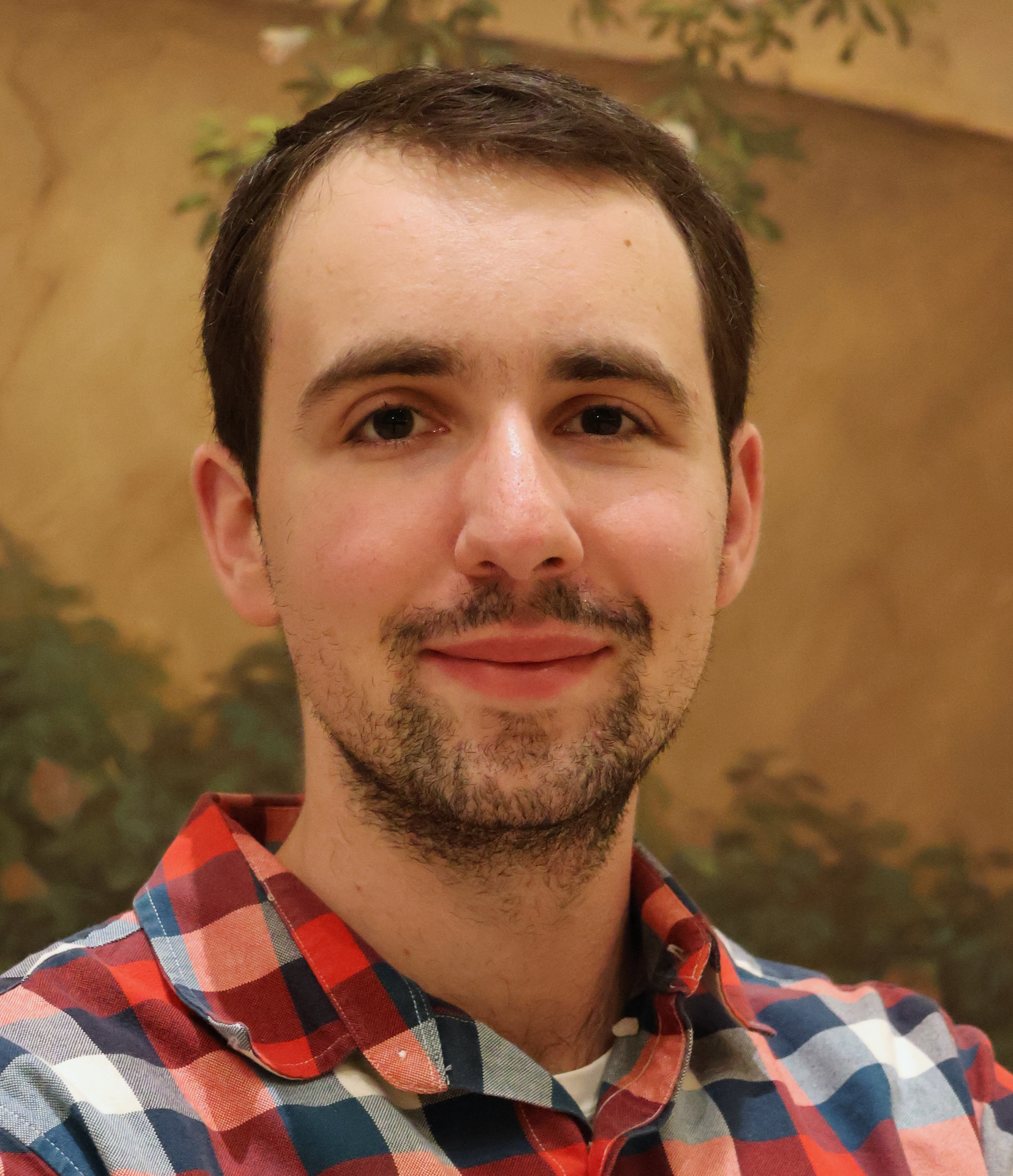
- Meller in 2025
- Born: January 6, 2000 (age 26)
- Education: Columbia University
- Occupation: Scrabble player
- Years active: 2010–present

YouTube information
- Channel: Mack Meller
- Subscribers: 6.79 thousand
- Views: 2.095 million
- Last updated: October 21, 2026

Mack Meller (born 2000) is an American competitive Scrabble player. He was the 2024 and 2026 North American national champion.

== Scrabble career ==
Meller began playing Scrabble when he was four. He soon displayed abilities well above his years, with Scrabble expert Joe Edley dubbing a ten-year-old Meller "the next champion". At that age, he played his first tournament in Ardsley, New York, in 2010, and won the Division 3 title at the event. In 2011, at age 11, he reportedly became the youngest Scrabble player to attain an "expert" 1600 rating. He won his first Division 1 title in Stamford, Connecticut, at the end of the year. By age 12, he was the highest-ranked player in North America under the age of 18. He reached the 2000-rating mark at age 13 in 2013.

Meller placed seventh at the North American national championship in both 2013 and 2014, earning the No. 6 ranking in North America at age 14. After a third-place finish in 2016, he was the runner-up to Will Anderson in 2017, bringing him to the No. 3 ranking in North America. In 2024, he became the North American national champion, winning a best-of-five playoff against Ian Weinstein. His title defense attempt ended as runner-up to Nigel Peltier in 2025. In 2026, he triumphed again in the fifth game of five, this time against Orry Swift.

Outside of competition, Meller makes videos about Scrabble on YouTube.

== Personal life ==
Meller grew up in Bedford, New York, in Westchester County, the son of Noel and Jessica Meller. He was homeschooled through Stanford Online High School. He graduated summa cum laude from Columbia University in 2020. He later moved to Lexington, Kentucky.

In other games, Meller won the KenKen tournament in Chappaqua, New York, in 2014. He collaborates with Pete Muller in creating a monthly meta crossword, and he placed second in Division D at the American Crossword Puzzle Tournament in 2025.
