= The Chrystal Rose Show =

- Starring: Chrystal Rose
- Country of origin: United Kingdom

Production
- Running time: 60mins (inc. adverts)
- Production company: Carlton Television

Original release
- Network: ITV

The Chrystal Rose Show is a British talk show presented by Chrystal Rose. Produced by Carlton Television, the programme discussed controversial subjects and was first broadcast on ITV in January 1993.
