= Roger Wright (pianist) =

American pianist and Scrabble player (born 1974)

Roger Robinson "Trey" Wright III (born April 1, 1974) is an American classical concert pianist. He is also a Scrabble player who won the United States National Scrabble Championship in 2004.

== Early life and musical training ==
Roger Wright was born in Houston, Texas, the son of Roger Wright Jr. and Christy (Schmidt) Wright. He began piano study at age 12. During high school he studied with Houston teacher John Weems. At 18 Wright made his concerto debut with the Houston Symphony Orchestra.

Wright entered the piano program at the University of Houston, where he continued his studies with Nancy Weems, Ruth Tomfohrde, Abbey Simon, and Horacio Gutiérrez, and earned his Bachelor of Music degree. During this time he won second prize in the 1996 (U.S.) Music Teachers National Association Piano Competition, College Division. Wright remained in Houston for graduate study, earning his Master of Music degree as a student of John Perry at Rice University's Shepherd School of Music; he would later do doctoral work with Perry at the University of Southern California in Los Angeles.

== Piano career ==
Wright has been a prizewinner in several international competitions, including first prizes in the 1998 Frinna Awerbuch International Piano Competition and the 2003 San Antonio International Piano Competition. His performances in the 2000 Sydney International Piano Competition led to a debut recording with the Australian Broadcasting Corporation. He has performed as a soloist in North America, Australia, Europe, and Africa. He has issued several recordings (see "Discography"). Wright has been the featured performer on national radio broadcasts by ABC Australia and CBC Radio Canada, as well as local programs on 105.1 K-Mozart in Los Angeles and WQXR in New York City. He has appeared with numerous orchestras including the Houston Symphony, the Calgary Philharmonic, the San Antonio Symphony, Mission Chamber Orchestra, Glacier Symphony, and Brussels Chamber Orchestra. Critical praise for Wright's piano playing has appeared in publications including The Washington Post, Clavier, American Record Guide, and the Houston Chronicle.

In addition to his solo performances, Wright has toured internationally with the comedian harmonists Hudson Shad and appeared with them on PBS, and has co-produced a recording of Richard Strauss's Enoch Arden, a setting of Tennyson's poem for narrator and piano, collaborating with actor Michael York and pianist John Bell Young. Wright resides in the Los Angeles, California, area, where he performs as a soloist, chamber musician, and accompanist, teaches both collegiately and privately, and composes.

== Scrabble career ==
Wright began playing Scrabble at 17 and has competed in U.S. national tournaments (under his nickname, Trey Wright) since 1992. He won the $25,000 first prize in the National Scrabble Championship of the United States in 2004, defeating former champion David Gibson by winning the first three games in a best-of-five final. During the 2004 finals a controversy arose as the result of a Scrabble play by Wright. He placed the word "LEZ" (slang for lesbian) on the board but was compelled by tournament officials to retract the move and play a different word, because the finals were being run with a list of over a hundred forbidden words (allowed during the preliminary rounds), instituted as a precondition to ESPN's plan to televise the finals at a later date. The incident was widely reported in the media, including on the BBC and in Slate. As of January 2017, Wright ranked 13th in career money winnings, with $41,584.

== Discography ==
- Piano Masterpieces. Music of Chopin, Debussy, Schumann, Liebermann, Rachmaninoff, Sculthorpe, Elisenda Fábregas, and Haydn. Eloquence 461 657–2. (2000). Radio airplay of one selection on this CD, Peter Sculthorpe's "Between Five Bells," earned Sculthorpe the Australasian Performing Right Association’s (APRA) Award for the Most Performed Contemporary Classical Composition of 2001.
- Enoch Arden by Richard Strauss and Alfred, Lord Tennyson, with Michael York, narrator, and John Bell Young, piano. Co-produced by Wright. Americus Records AMR20021025. (2002)
- Miniatures. Music of Soler, Liebermann, Schumann, and William Mason. Wright Sounds. (2002)
- Rzewski & Schubert. Music of Rzewski and Schubert. Wright Sounds. (2002)
- Roger Wright in Concert. Music of Schumann, Haydn, Rzewski, and Schubert. Wright Sounds. (2004)
- Evocations. Music of J. S. Bach, Levitzki, Schubert, Chopin, Poulenc, and Liszt. Wright Sounds. (2007)
- Piano Favorites. Music of Schumann, Soler, Mason, Chopin, and Schubert. Wright Sounds. (2009)
- Rachmaninoff Piano Concerto No. 2. With the Orquesta Sinfónica Nacional de Costa Rica, conducted by Chosei Komatsu. Wright Sounds. (2010)
- At the River. Music of Ravel, Rachmaninoff, Poulenc, Rzewski, and Balakirev. Wright Sounds. (2011)
