= Joel Sherman =

American Scrabble player (born 1962)

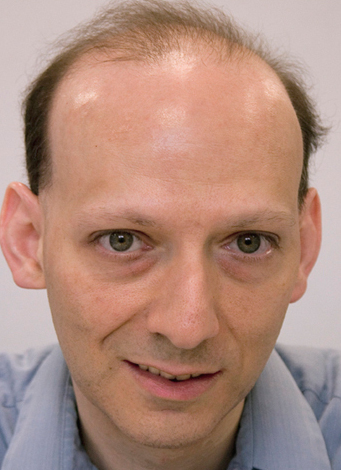
- Sherman at the World Scrabble Championship 1997
- Born: 1962 (age 63–64); Bronx County, New York
- Other name: GI Joel
- Education: Bronx High School of Science
- Occupation: Professional English-language Scrabble player
- Years active: 1988–present

Joel Sherman (born 1962), nicknamed GI Joel, is an American professional English-language Scrabble player and former world champion. He is featured in Stefan Fatsis's book Word Freak, in Eric Chaikin's film Word Wars, and in Scott Petersen's film Scrabylon. He is also mentioned in Collins Gem's reference book.

He was born in The Bronx, New York in 1962, and is an alumnus of the Bronx High School of Science.

Sherman's major Scrabble tournament victories include:

- 1997 World Scrabble Championship - Washington, D.C.
- 1998 Brand's Crossword Game King's Cup
- 2002 National Scrabble Championship - San Diego, California
- 2018 North American Scrabble Championship - Buffalo, New York

Since beginning his career in 1988, he has played at least 4,750 tournament games, winning about 64%, and earning at least $135,000 in prize money. He is director of NASPA Games Club #56, which meets on Thursday evenings in New York City.

Sherman holds the record for the highest score recorded in a tournament game played with the North American lexicon, having defeated Bradley Robbins 803–285 at a tournament in Stamford, Connecticut on December 9, 2011.

His nickname is derived from a health problem, gastrointestinal reflux syndrome, and a pun on the G.I. Joe action figure.
