= Stewart Holden =

Scrabble player

Stewart Holden is a competitive Scrabble player from the United Kingdom. Holden is originally from Oxford but has resided near Belfast, Northern Ireland since 2008. He represented England at the World Scrabble Championship 2003, where he finished in 62nd place, and represented Northern Ireland at the World Scrabble Championship 2011 where he finished in 28th place and achieved the highest game score of the tournament (694pts).

He has achieved ranking among the top 100 competitive Scrabble players in the world and as the runner-up in the 2007 National Scrabble Championship. Holden also compiles the weekly Scrabble puzzle for The Guardian newspaper. Formerly, he was a committee member of the Association of British Scrabble Players, owning his own business, Tilefish, selling Scrabble equipment and resources. That enterprise was sold to fellow ABSP committee member Amy Byrne in July 2008.

Holden was the editor of The Scrabble Player's Handbook, a free 162-page ebook written by twelve former World Scrabble Championship participants including 2016 World Champion Brett Smitheram. The book was launched on 1 January 2013, had been downloaded over 10,000 times within two weeks and has now been downloaded over 100,000 times. It received widespread coverage in Scrabble media when it was launched.

== Countdown ==
In 2004, Holden was the overall winner of Series 51 of the long-running British television game show Countdown. Holden won eight games to become an octochamp, including a score of 137 in his last preliminary match which was, at the time, the third highest score in the history of the programme. His eight-game score of 870 was also the third highest score since the introduction of the 15-round format in 2001.

Holden returned for the series finals as the number one seed, beating Steve Graston in the series final with a scoreline of 104–81. He was invited back for the twelfth Champion of Champions series but declined due to the conflicting dictionaries used in Countdown and competitive Scrabble affecting his performance in the latter game. Between 2008 and 2018 Holden contributed the content for a daily desktop calendar of Countdown puzzles.

Holden is now a full-time humanist celebrant with Humanists UK in Northern Ireland; he has conducted several hundred weddings and funeral services, including those of Northern Ireland radio presenters Stephen Clements and Kim Lenaghan.
