= Moiz Ullah Baig =

Pakistani Scrabble player

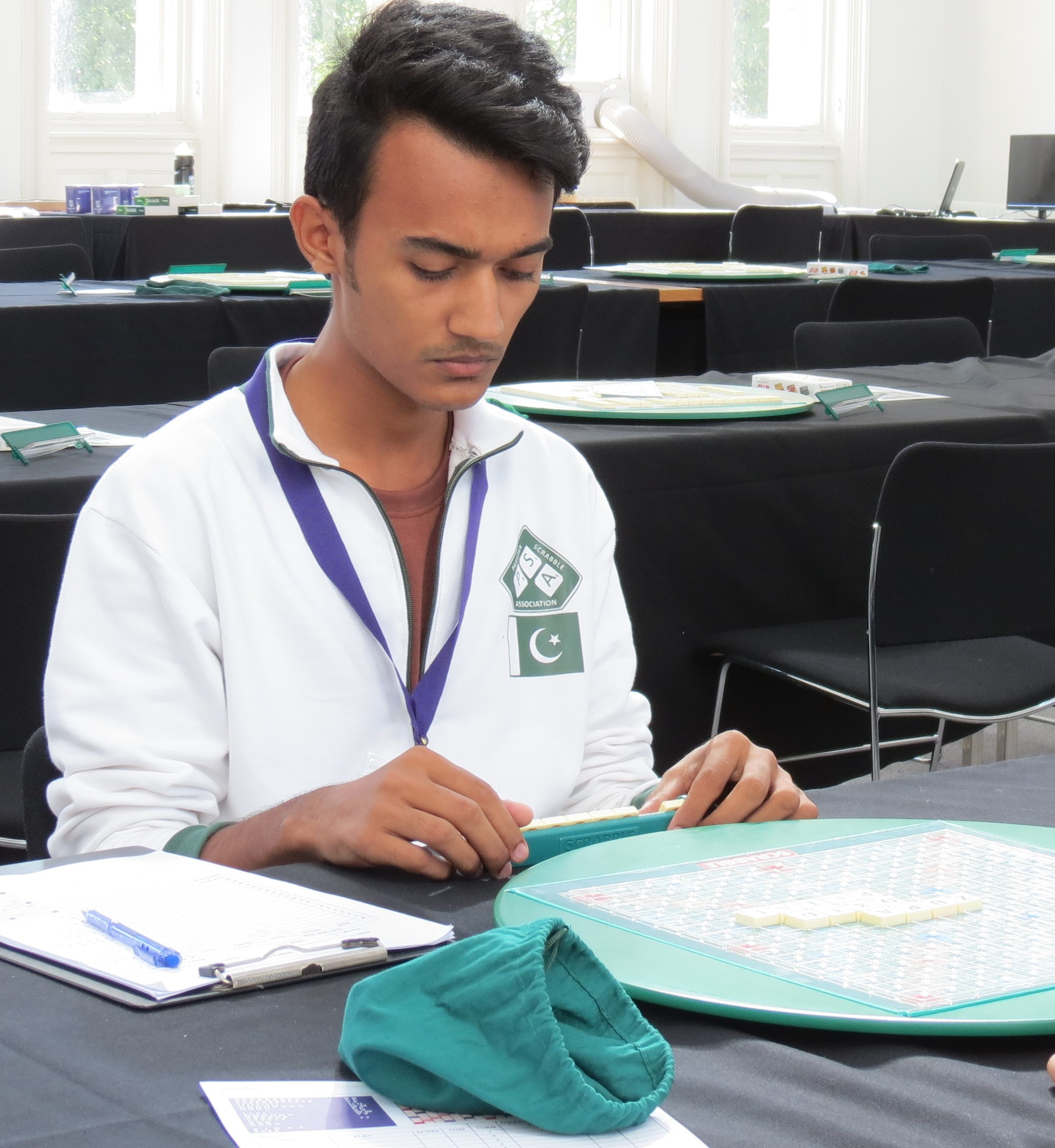
Moiz Ullah Baig

Moiz Ullah Baig (born April 1997 in Karachi, Pakistan) is a Pakistani Scrabble player who won the World Youth Scrabble Championship 2013 and the World Junior Scrabble Championship 2018, becoming the first player ever to win both. He won the Pakistan Scrabble Championship in 2018 and is currently the number 1 player of the country. In December 2018, with a WESPA rating of 1921, he climbed up to the 71st place in the world rankings – his career highest.

Moiz was conferred with a gold medal by Nazaria-i-Pakistan Trust in 2014 for his achievements in Scrabble. He was mentioned alongside Nobel Prize Laureate Malala Yousafzai, Asma Jahangir, and several others in the Newsline Magazine, on being one of the Pakistanis who have made a prominent mark internationally. He is referred to as the "giant of scrabble" in Pakistan. Moiz was appointed as a coach of Pakistan Scrabble Team in 2016.

Moiz studied at Technische Universität Darmstadt, NED University of Engineering and Technology, DJ Science College, and Falconhouse Grammar School.

== Playing history ==
Moiz debuted the national circuit in 2012 at age 14 and beat several top-rated players in his first tournament. He joined the international scene in 2013.

=== 2012 ===
Moiz won the All-Pakistan Inter-School Scrabble Championship. Later in the year, he was selected to represent Pakistan at the World Youth Scrabble Championship in the UK, but he couldn't get the visa.

=== 2013 ===
Moiz won the World Youth Scrabble Championship held in Dubai, UAE, becoming the first Pakistani to do so.

=== 2014 ===
Moiz finished 3rd at the Mind Sports International Youth Cup held in London, UK. He was unsuccessful in defending his title at the World Youth Scrabble Championship in Colombo, Sri Lanka.

=== 2015 ===
Moiz finished runner-up at the Pakistan Scrabble Championship.

=== 2016 ===
Moiz missed the quarter-finals of the World Scrabble Championship 2016 in Lille, France, after losing his last match to the former World Champion Adam Logan by 1 point, finishing 15th. He was the runner-up at the Pakistan Scrabble Championship for the second time in a row.

=== 2017 ===
Moiz finished runner-up at both, the World Junior Scrabble Championship held in Nottingham, UK, and the Princess Youth Scrabble Cup held in Bangkok, Thailand.

=== 2018 ===
Moiz won the World Junior Scrabble Championship held in Torquay, UK, the Pakistan Scrabble Championship, and the Pakistan Scrabble Champions Trophy. He rose to the number 1 spot in national rankings ending Waseem Khatri's decade-long supremacy. He was selected to represent 'Team Rest of Asia' at the Alchemist Cup – World Team Challenge in Penang, Malaysia, where he ended up 16th among the top 50 players of the world.

=== 2019 ===
He was unsuccessful in defending his title at the Pakistan Scrabble Championship.

=== 2022 ===
Moiz won the 10th Continental Scrabble Championship in Berlin, Germany.
