= High score Scrabble =

Board game variant

High score Scrabble is a variant of the board game Scrabble that was popular among tournament players in the United Kingdom in the 1970s and 1980s. The first National Scrabble Championship of the UK was played by high score rules in 1971, and was won by Steven Haskell.

== Rules ==
In modern "match play Scrabble" tournaments, players dispute a fixed number of games. In most major tournaments, for example the World Scrabble Championship and the National Scrabble Championship the players are sorted by number of games won and to break ties between players with the same number of wins, the total of the player's scores minus the total of his opponent's score (known as the spread) is calculated. For example, a game won 500–350 would give a spread of +150.

In high score Scrabble, wins are not counted. Instead only the total number of points is important. Whether the player wins or loses the game, or what his opponent's score is are not a factor. Thus a player could lose all of their games and still finish in the top half of a tournament with above average scores.

Phil Appleby scored 1049 in a British high score Scrabble game in 1989. However the official Association of British Scrabble Players website does not list this score as the highest ever, rather 712 by David Webb in 2008, long after high score Scrabble had been replaced by match play Scrabble in the UK.
