= Matt Graham (Scrabble player) =

American comedian and Scrabble expert

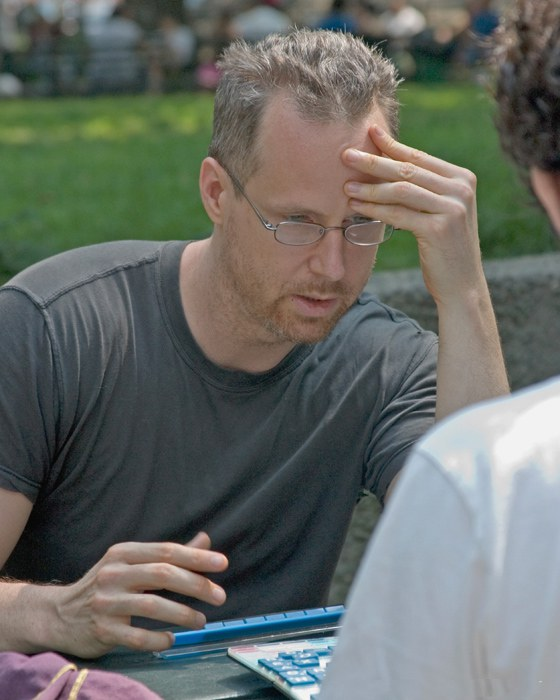
- Graham playing Scrabble in Washington Square Park, 2007
- Born: Indiana
- Occupations: Comedian; Scrabble player

Matt Graham is an American comedian and Scrabble player who has represented the United States in international competition. He was the 1997 World Scrabble Championship runner-up.

== Biography ==
Graham was born in Indiana, and lives in Queens, New York. In the late 1980s, Graham shared a Boston apartment with Marc Maron and David Cross.

Graham was featured in the 2001 book Word Freak and in the 2004 documentary film Word Wars. As a stand-up comedian, he appeared several times on Late Night with Conan O'Brien. Graham worked briefly on one season as writer on Saturday Night Live, but was fired by head writer Colin Quinn after not having much of his material included in the show. He also wrote for Late Night with Conan O'Brien, Chain Reaction, and Grand Slam. Graham performed his show This Too Shall Suck at the 2012 FringeNYC Festival.
