= World Youth Scrabble Championships =

The first World Youth Scrabble Championships were held in Wollongong, Australia 2006. Competitors from Australia, Bahrain, Canada, England, Hong Kong, India, Indonesia, Kenya, Kuwait, Malaysia, New Zealand, Nigeria, Oman, Pakistan, Philippines, Qatar, Singapore, South Africa, Sri Lanka, Thailand, Trinidad and Tobago, United Arab Emirates and United States have competed in the annual tournament so far. WYSC is open to anyone under the age of 18 on 1 January of the year of each tournament. The tournament used to be held at the start of December but was brought forward to August for 2014. So far, the WYSC tournament has been held in Malaysia six times, Australia twice, Dubai twice, Sri Lanka twice and France, Philippines and the United Kingdom once each.

== List of finals ==
| Year | Winner | 1st Runner-up | 2nd Runner-up | Location | Entrants |
|---|---|---|---|---|---|
| 2026 | (Australia) Dineth Fernando | (England) Samuel Crispin | (India) Suyash Manchali | Nairobi, Kenya | 218 |
| 2025 | (India) Madhav Gopal Kamath | (Niger) Abdulqudus Olawe A | (Pakistan) Aezham Ahmed | Kualar Lampur, Malaysia | 218 |
| 2024 | (Pakistan) Affan Salman | (India) Suyash Manchali | (Sri Lanka) Adheesha Dissanayake | Kalutara, Sri Lanka | 136 |
| 2023 | (Sri Lanka) Hivin Dilmith | (Sri Lanka) Adheesha Dissanayake | (Sri Lanka) Kavindu Malawaraarachchi | Trang province, Thailand | 142 |
| 2022 | (Pakistan) Ali Salman | (India) Madhav Gopal Kamath | (Pakistan) Hasham Hadi Khan | woogles.io | 86 |
| 2021 | (Pakistan) Syed Imaad Ali | (India) Madhav Gopal Kamath | (Thailand) Napat Vatjaranurathorn | woogles.io | 70 |
| 2019 | (Thailand) Tarin Pairor | (Sri Lanka) Janul De Silva | (India) Yash Potnis | Kuala Lumpur, Malaysia | 190 |
| 2018 | (Pakistan) Syed Imaad Ali | (Sri Lanka) Janul De Silva | (Thailand) Napat Vatjaranurathorn | Dubai, United Arab Emirates | 116 |
| 2017 | (Sri Lanka) Aabid Ismail | (Sri Lanka) Janul De Silva | (Pakistan) Abdullah Abbasi | Kuala Lumpur, Malaysia | 176 |
| 2016 | (United Arab Emirates) Sanchit Kapoor | (Sri Lanka) Thavalakshman Yoganathan | (Sri Lanka) Aabid Ismail | Lille, France | 107 |
| 2015 | (Singapore) Nicholas Hong | (Pakistan) Abdullah Abbasi | (United Kingdom) Jack Durand | Perth, Australia | 106 |
| 2014 | (United Kingdom) Jack Durand | (Singapore) Yong Jian Rong | (Pakistan) Mariam Arif | Colombo, Sri Lanka | 120 |
| 2013 | (Pakistan) Moiz Ullah Baig | (Pakistan) Javeria Baig | (Thailand) Nuttapong Pholthip | Dubai, United Arab Emirates | 136 |
| 2012 | (Australia) Michael McKenna | (Malaysia) Cheong Yi Wei | (Malaysia) William Kang | Birmingham, United Kingdom | 60 |
| 2011 | (Australia) Anand Bharadwaj | (Singapore) Victor Gwee | (Australia) Michael McKenna | Johor Bahru, Malaysia | 84 |
| 2010 | (Malaysia) Ker Jen Ho | (Thailand) Preedee Khongthanara | (Malaysia) William Kang | Manila, Philippines | 82 |
| 2009 | (Malaysia) Suanne Ong | (Australia) Matt Alastair | (Australia) Michael McKenna | Johor Bahru, Malaysia | 81 |
| 2008 | (Thailand) Charnrit Khongthanarat | (Malaysia) Darren Khoo Beng Way | (Malaysia) Scott Chung | Penang, Malaysia | 59 |
| 2007 | (Singapore) Toh Weibin | (Malaysia) Sean Chung Chin Shiu | (Malaysia) Suanne Ong | Johor Bahru, Malaysia | 54 |
| 2006 | (Australia) David Eldar | (United Kingdom) Austin Shin | (Canada) Will Nediger | Wollongong, Australia | 51 |

== Championships by country ==
| Country | Titles^{[1]} |
|---|---|
| Pakistan | 5 |
| Australia | 4 |
| Thailand | 3 |
| Malaysia | 2 |
| Sri Lanka | 2 |
| Singapore | 2 |
| India | 1 |
| United Arab Emirates | 1 |
| United Kingdom | 1 |

== World Youth Scrabble Cup 2025 : Malaysia ==
WYSC 2025 which is the 20th edition of the World Youth Scrabble Champion will be held from 30 September to 1 October 2025 at Subang Jaya, Selangor, Malaysia.

== World Youth Scrabble Cup 2024 : Sri Lanka ==
The World Youth Scrabble Championship was held from 6 to 8 September 2024 at Citrus Waskaduwa, Kalutara in Sri Lanka. Mr. Ashok Bhandarkar was the tournament director. Affan Salman was gibsonised, i.e. declared the winner of the World Youth Scrabble Cup before the last round.

Final Standings of WYSC 2024
| Place | Player name | Country |
|---|---|---|
| 1 | Affan Salman | Pakistan |
| 2 | Suyash Manchali | India |
| 3 | Adheesha Dissanayake | Sri Lanka |
| 4 | Madhav Gopal Kamath | India |
| 5 | Samuel Crispin | England |
| 6 | Bilal Asher | Pakistan |
| 7 | Kritsanaphong Boonke | Thailand |
| 8 | Ibrahim Mansoor | Pakistan |
| 9 | Ho Xuan Lei | Singapore |
| 10 | Aehzam Ahmed | Pakistan |

Age Group Winners

| Category | Player (age in bracket) | Country |
|---|---|---|
| U10 | Nathan Tan (9) | Malaysia |
| U12 | Inam Irshad (11) | Sri Lanka |
| U14 | Bilal Asher (12) | Pakistan |
| U16 | Suyash Manchali (15) | India |

Category Winners

| Category | Player | Country |
|---|---|---|
| Best Female Player | Alexis Koh | Malaysia |
| Best Novice | Samuel Crispin | England |

== WESPA Youth Cup 2023 : Trang, Thailand ==
The WESPA Youth Cup 2023 was held from 1 to 3 December 2023 at Thumrin Thana Hotel in Mueang Trang district, Trang Province in Thailand. 142 players participated representing Australia, Hong Kong, India, Indonesia, Kenya, Malaysia, Nepal, Nigeria, Pakistan, Philippines, Qatar, Romania, Singapore, Sri Lanka, Thailand, United Kingdom and the United States.

Hivin Dilmith (Sri Lanka) was crowned the World Youth Scrabble Champion 2023.

| Place | Player | Country |
|---|---|---|
| 1st | Hivin Dilmith | Sri Lanka |
| 2nd | Adheesha Dissanayake | Sri Lanka |
| 3rd | Kavindu Malawaraarachchi | Sri Lanka |
| 4th | Ali Salman | Pakistan |
| 5th | Madhav Gopal Kamath | India |
| 6th | Bilal Asher | Pakistan |
| 7th | Affan Salman | Pakistan |
| 8th | Ahmed Salman | Pakistan |
| 9th | Ahmad Aqmarul Harraz | Malaysia |
| 10th | Suyash Manchali | India |

The Sri Lankan youth Scrabble team placed first, second, and third at the 2023 World Youth Scrabble Championship, which featured 142 competitors from 17 countries. Sri Lanka also won the Best Team title for the second consecutive year.

Sixteen-year-old Hivin Dilmith of Mahinda College, Galle, has reached a remarkable pinnacle by being named the World Youth Scrabble Champion at the WYC 2023. Fifteen-year-old Adheesha Dissanayake of Gateway College, Colombo claimed the 1st runner-up position in the championship. Seventeen-year-old Kavindu Malawaraarachchi of Royal College, Colombo, achieved the 2nd runner-up spot, marking the first-ever clean sweep of the top three positions in the tournament's history.

Age Group Winners

| Category | Champion | 1st Runner-Up | 2nd Runner-up |
|---|---|---|---|
| U8 | Paul Mavichak (Thailand) | Affan Sohail (Pakistan) | Divyashri Sarthavall (United Kingdom) |
| U10 | Nathan Tan (Malaysia) | Samuel Fok (Hong Kong) | Raven Wu (Hong Kong) |
| U12 | Bilal Asher (Pakistan) | Samarth Manchali (India) | Inam Irshad (Sri Lanka) |
| U14 | Madhav Gopal Kamath (India) | Ahmed Salman (Pakistan) | Ahana Goyal (India) |
| U16 | Adheesha Dissanayake (Sri Lanka) | Affan Salman (Pakistan) | Suyash Manchali (India) |

Category Winners

| Category | Player | Country |
|---|---|---|
| Youngest Player in Top 25 | Nathan Tan (8 years old / 16th place) | Malaysia |
| Best Novice (1st WYC F2F) | Hivin Dilmith | Sri Lanka |
| Best Lady Player | Ahana Goyal | India |
| High Game | Imad Irshad (708 pts) | Sri Lanka |
| High Word | Sehaan Owais TOOLKITS 203 points | Pakistan |
| Best Team* | Team Sri Lanka (55 wins, +3915): 1. Hivin Dilmith; 2. Adheesha Dissanayake; 3. Kavindu Malawaraarachchi | Sri Lanka |

*based on wins and spreads of top 3 players

== WESPA Youth Cup 2022 : Virtual (woogles.io) ==
The WESPA Youth Cup 2022 (formerly known as the World Youth Scrabble Championship) was hosted by Pakistan Scrabble Association through the online woogles.io platform from 15 October 2022 – 30 October 2022

List of Championship Prize winners are as follows:

| Place | Player | Country |
|---|---|---|
| 1st | Ali Salman | Pakistan |
| 2nd | Madhav Kamath | India |
| 3rd | Hasham Hadi Khan | Pakistan |
| 4th | Ronnie Bennett | Australia |
| 5th | Adheesha Dissanayake | Sri Lanka |
| 6th | Pramit Rao | India |
| 7th | Affan Salman | Pakistan |
| 8th | Sandali Vithanage | Sri Lanka |
| 9th | Chaiyottha Manachaisit | Thailand |
| 10th | Eirfan Razman | Malaysia |

Age Group Winners

| Category | Player (age in bracket) | Country |
|---|---|---|
| U8 Champion | Nathan Tan (7) | Malaysia |
| U10 Champion | Samarth Manchali (9) | India |
| U12 Champion | Jeffrey Lam (11) | Australia |
| U14 Champion | Madhav Gopal Kamath (12) | India |
| U16 Champion | Adheesha Dissanayake (14) | Sri Lanka |

Category Winners

| Category | Player | Country |
|---|---|---|
| Best Female Player | Sandali Vithanage | Sri Lanka |
| Youngest Player in Top 25 | Jeffrey Lam (11 years old / 24th place) | Australia |
| High Game and High Word | Shane Abbas Highest game 721 vs Jake Haidar; Highest word: AZURINES 212 points | Pakistan |
| Best Team* | Team Sri Lanka (76.5, +5195) Top 3 Players: 1. Adheesha Dissanayake; 2. Sandali Vithanage; 3. Hivin Dilmith | Sri Lanka |

*based on wins and spreads of top 3 players

There were 85 players from 15 countries that took part in this 2022 edition:

| Continent | Country | Number of Players |
|---|---|---|
| Oceania | Australia | 6 |
| Europe | Germany | 2 |
| Europe | United Kingdom | 2 |
| Asia | Hong Kong | 7 |
| Asia | India | 10 |
| Asia | Indonesia | 3 |
| Asia | Malaysia | 11 |
| Asia | Nepal | 1 |
| Asia | Pakistan | 15 |
| Asia | Philippines | 4 |
| Asia | Singapore | 2 |
| Asia | Sri Lanka | 10 |
| Asia | Thailand | 7 |
| Africa | Nigeria | 2 |
| North America | United States of America | 4 |

== WESPA Youth Cup 2021 : Virtual (woogles.io) ==
List of Championship Prize winners are as follows:

| Place | Player | Country |
|---|---|---|
| 1st | Syed Imaad Ali | Pakistan |
| 2nd | Madhav Gopal Kamath | India |
| 3rd | Napat Vatjaranurathorn | Thailand |
| 4th | Hasham Hadi Khan | Pakistan |
| 5th | Sandali Vithanage | Sri Lanka |
| 6th | Nattapat Nak-in | Thailand |
| 7th | Thomson Law Long Yin | Hong Kong |
| 8th | Suyash Manchali | India |
| 9th | Noah Slatkoff | Canada |
| 10th | Ronnie Bennett | Australia |

Age Group Winners

| Category | Player (age in bracket) | Country |
|---|---|---|
| U10 Champion | Jeffrey Lam (9) | Australia |
| U12 Champion | Madhav Gopal Kamath (11) | India |
| U14 Champion | Suyash Manchali (12) | India |
| U16 Champion | Noah Slatkoff (15) | Canada |

Category Winners

| Category | Player | Country |
|---|---|---|
| Best Female Player | Sandali Vithanage | Sri Lanka |
| Youngest Player in Top 20 | Dresden Lim Zhan Le | Malaysia |
| High Game and High Word | Napat Vatjaranurathorn Highest game 690 vs Dresden Lim Zhan Le; Highest word: EXPENDERS 221 points | Thailand |
| Best Team* | Team Pakistan (76–32, +6734) | |
| Spirit of Virtual Scrabble | Team India | |

*based on wins and spreads of top 3 players

== WESPA Youth Cup 2020 : Virtual ==
The 2020 edition of the WESPA was held amidst the backdrop of COVID-19 pandemic, and took the form of Team tournament instead of individual competition.

2020 Championship Winners:

| Place | Country |
|---|---|
| 1st | Thailand |
| 2nd | Pakistan |
| 3rd | Sri Lanka |
| 4th | India |

Player of the Tournament

Player of the Tournament was awarded to Thailand's Napat Vatjaranurathorn for displaying wonderful playing skills throughout the tournament.

Full closing ceremony was broadcast live on World English-Language Scrabble Players Association (WESPA) Facebook

== WESPA Youth Cup 2019 : Kuala Lumpur, Malaysia ==
Tournament report can be found here.

List of all prize winners can be found here.

| Place | Player | Country |
|---|---|---|
| 1st | Tarin Pairor | Thailand |
| 2nd | Janul De Silva | Sri Lanka |
| 3rd | Yash Potnis | India |
| 4th | Joshua Law Bing Han | Singapore |
| 5th | Syed Imaad Ali | Pakistan |
| 6th | Vignesh Pirapaharan | Sri Lanka |
| 7th | Liao Yi | Singapore |
| 8th | Brian Po | Hong Kong |
| 9th | Jarrett Tan Yan Keat | Singapore |
| 10th | Eirfan Razman | Malaysia |

Thailand's Tarin Pairor won the 2019 Wespa Youth Cup, held in Kuala Lumpur, Malaysia from 29 November to 1 December of that year. (Completing a meteoric rise through youth Scrabble by the 15-year old, who finished 74th as a rookie in 2017 and 7th in Dubai in 2018.) Defending champion Syed Imaad Ali of Pakistan finished 5th while Janul De Silva of Sri Lanka ended in second place for the third consecutive year.

Thailand took home the award for the best national team, i.e. the team with the highest cumulative score among its top three players: Pairor and teammates Napat Vatjaranurathorn (who finished 12th overall) and Thanyanat Niratsungnoen (31st). This is the first year since 2008 that the WESPA Youth champion was Thai. The game of Scrabble is a popular competitive activity for schoolchildren in Thailand (where it is known as 'Crossword') and the country produced several premier adult players over the previous two decades.

== WESPA Youth Cup 2018 : Dubai ==
Tournament report can be found here.

List of all prize winners can be found here.

| Place | Player | Country |
|---|---|---|
| 1st | Syed Imaad Ali | Pakistan |
| 2nd | Janul de Silva | Sri Lanka |
| 3rd | Napat Vatjaranurathorn | Thailand |
| 4th | Aabid Ismail | Sri Lanka |
| 5th | Sohaib Sanaullah | Pakistan |
| 6th | Brian Po | Hong Kong |
| 7th | Tarin Pairor | Thailand |
| 8th | Vraj Jain | India |
| 9th | Thomson Law Long Yin | Hong Kong |
| 10th | Radinka Dissanayake | Sri Lanka |

In the 2018 youth cup, held in Dubai in the United Arab Emirates, Syed Imaad Ali of Pakistan overcame Sri Lanka's Janul Del Silva to take the championship. Ali, Sohaib Sanaullah and Ali Rashid Khan earned Pakistan the award for the best national team in the tournament. Del Silva's second-place finish marked the second year in a row he had taken silver in this world championship. His Sri Lankan teammate Aabid Ismail, champion in 2017 and third in 2016, finished 4th in Dubai.

== WESPA Youth Cup 2017 : Subang Jaya, Malaysia ==
The 2017 edition was renamed as "WESPA Youth Cup". Originally scheduled to be held in Johor Baru, it was later moved to Subang Jaya. Aabid Ismail from Sri Lanka was crowned the World Youth Scrabble Champion 2017.

| Place | Player | Country |
|---|---|---|
| 1st | Aabid Ismail | Sri Lanka |
| 2nd | Janul de Silva | Sri Lanka |
| 3rd | Abdullah Abbasi | Pakistan |
| 4th | Hasham Hadi Khan | Pakistan |
| 5th | Sohaib Sanaulah | Pakistan |
| 6th | Nititorn Laimek | Thailand |
| 7th | Daniyal Sanaullah | Pakistan |
| 8th | Vignesh Pirapaharan | Sri Lanka |
| 9th | Napat Vatjaranuratho | Thailand |
| 10th | Pansub Direkwatana | Thailand |

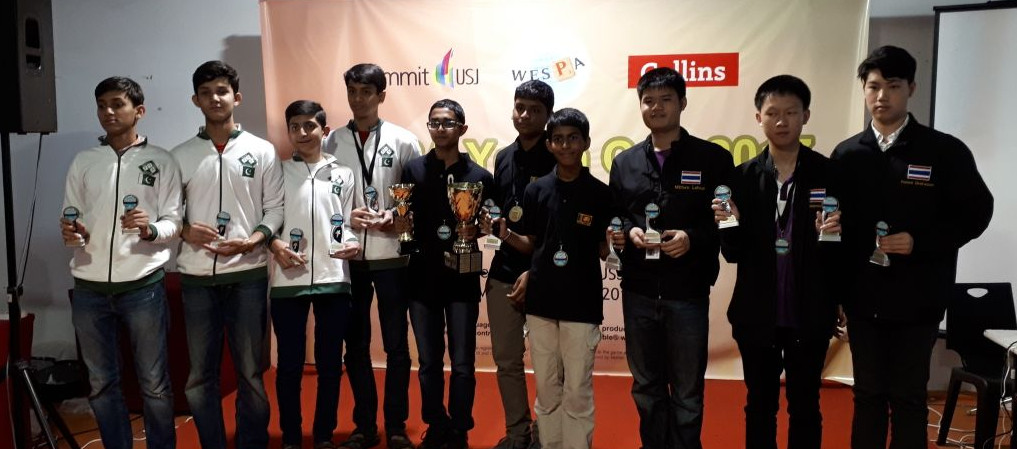
The top 10 prize winners from WESPA Youth Cup 2017

Aabid Ismail became the first Sri Lankan World Youth Scrabble Champion. Second place went to Aabid's schoolmate Janul de Silva who also won the under 16 World Scrabble title which was previously held by Aabid. Abdullah Abbasi who was runner up in 2015 secured third place. Sri Lanka secured the team title for the third year in succession on the strength of Aabid and Janul's performances along with that of Vignesh Pirapaharan who secured eighth place. Adheesha Dissanayake also of Sri Lanka won the under ten title. The under twelve title was secured by Napat Narinsuksanti, the under fourteen title by Hasham Hadi Khan and the under eight title by Madhav Gopal Kamath.

All the first ten places were filled by players from Sri Lanka, Pakistan and Thailand. This year two special awards were given out, the Amnuay award went to Akkarapol Kwhansak an official from Thailand and the WESPA Chair award to Abdullah Abbasi.

== WYSC 2016 : Lille, France ==
In 2016, the World English-Language Scrabble Players Association (WESPA) Youth Committee cooperated with the Mindsports Academy to organise the Championship in Lille, France. Sanchit Kapoor from the United Arab Emirates was crowned the World Youth Scrabble Champion 2016.

| Place | Player | Country |
|---|---|---|
| 1st | Sanchit Kapoor | United Arab Emirates |
| 2nd | Thavalakshman Yoganathan | Sri Lanka |
| 3rd | Aabid Ismail | Sri Lanka |
| 4th | Siriwat Suttapintu | Thailand |
| 5th | Aditya Iyengar | India |
| 6th | Jack Durand | United Kingdom |
| 7th | Hasham Hadi Khan | Pakistan |
| 8th | Qays Sangani | Sri Lanka |
| 9th | Kevin Bowerman | United States |
| 10th | Syed Imaad Ali | Pakistan |

Sri Lanka retained the team title they won in Perth Australia. The high game award went to Okiki Hector Fowobaje of Nigeria for scoring 653 points. The high word award was shared between three players Shohaib Sanaullah, Hansi Weerasooriya and Aabid Ismail all of whom scored 158 points for BASCINET, FILAMENT, OBEDIENT respectively.

Aabid Ismail, Hasham Hadi Khan, Syed Imaad Ali and Monis Khan emerged as World 16 Scrabble Champion, the World Under 14 Scrabble Champion, the World Under 12 Scrabble Champion and the World Under 10 Scrabble Champion respectively. Thus Pakistan secured three of the four age group prizes on offer.

For the first time in the tournament's history, there were no contestants from the host country.

== WYSC 2015 : Perth Australia ==
The tenth edition of the WYSC was held in Perth, Australia from 31 October at the University of Western Australia. Nicholas Hong of Singapore emerged as the overall winner while Sri Lanka won the team title. By virtue of winning the WYSC, Hong qualified to take part in the WESPA Championships (formerly World Scrabble Championship) held after WYSC 2015.

| Place | Player | Country |
|---|---|---|
| 1st | Nicholas Hong | Singapore |
| 2nd | Abdullah Abbasi | Pakistan |
| 3rd | Jack Durand | England |
| 4th | Janul De Silva | Sri Lanka |
| 5th | Tim Mason | Australia |
| 6th | Thirandi De Silva | Sri Lanka |
| 7th | Sanchit Kapoor | United Arab Emirates |
| 8th | Lambotharan Yoganathan | Sri Lanka |
| 9th | John McNaughton | New Zealand |
| 10th | Samrath Singh Bhatia | India |

The defending champion Jack Durand secured 3rd place.

== WYSC 2014 : Colombo, Sri Lanka ==
| Place | Player | Country |
|---|---|---|
| 1st | Jack Durand | England |
| 2nd | Yong Jian Rong | Singapore |
| 3rd | Mariam Arif | Pakistan |
| 4th | Victor Gwee | Singapore |
| 5th | Sanchit Kapoor | United Arab Emirates |
| 6th | Gayanath Chandrasena | Sri Lanka |
| 7th | Lewis Hawkins | New Zealand |
| 8th | Poh Ying Ming | Singapore |
| 9th | Abdullah Abbasi | Pakistan |
| 10th | Viggnah Selvaraj | Sri Lanka |

Based on the scores of the top three from that country, Singapore emerged as the best team.

Although the tournament is usually held in December, it was held in August in 2014 to coincide with the Colombo Scrabble Festival. The festival began with the Sri Lanka International Scrabble Championship on 22 August while the WYSC took place on the 29th. In between, the WESPA Seniors' tournament was held on the 26th. Since both the WYSC and the WESPA Seniors event had a side tournament, participants had the opportunity to take part in three consecutive international tournaments at the same venue.

Jack Durand emerged as the winner of WYSC 2014 at the end of Round 23.

== WYSC 2013 : Dubai ==
| Place | Player | Country |
|---|---|---|
| 1st | Moiz Ullah Baig | Pakistan |
| 2nd | Javeria Mirza | Pakistan |
| 3rd | Nuttapong Pholthip | Thailand |
| 4th | Navya Zaveri | UAE |
| 5th | Jack Durand | United Kingdom |
| 6th | Sanchit Kapoor | UAE |
| 7th | Anand Bharadwaj | Australia |
| 8th | Mariam Arif | Pakistan |
| 9th | Tim Bryant | United States |
| 10th | Tim Mason | Australia |

Moiz Ullah Baig of Pakistan became the World Youth Scabble Champion while compatriot Javeria Mirza secured the second place. Maria Arif also from Pakistan secured 8th place and ensured that Pakistan won the award for the best team as well. Players from Sri Lanka, Malaysia and Singapore were conspicuously missing from the top ten. There has been at least one player from these countries in the top ten in past events.

== WYSC 2012 : Birmingham, England ==
| Place | Player | Country |
|---|---|---|
| 1st | Michael McKenna | Australia |
| 2nd | Cheong Yi Wei | Malaysia |
| 3rd | William Kang | Malaysia |
| 4th | Navya Zaveri | UAE |
| 5th | Yeshan Jayasuriya | Sri Lanka |
| 6th | Yasiru Fernando | Sri Lanka |
| 7th | Tim Byrant | United States |
| 8th | Sompong Phosai | Thailand |
| 9th | Jessica Pratesi | United Kingdom |
| 10th | Sinatarn Pattanasuwanna | Thailand |

WYSC 2012 took place at the UK Britannia Hotel in Birmingham, England from Friday, 7 December to Sunday, 9 December. There are expected to be 99 entries in 2012 making it the most populous WYSC event yet but only 60 managed to get there mostly due to visa problems. Michael McKenna sealed his victory at the tournament with a game to spare- he won game 23 to lead of 1.5 wins going into the final round. This win now means that Australia is home to more WYSC than any other nation. Australia has three, Malaysia has two and Singapore and Thailand have one apiece.

Michael McKenna has also attended six out of the seven WYSC events (2007–2012). Past WYSC events have held trivia tournaments, however, 2012 held a warmup tournament. Navya Zaveri of the UAE won the Under 16 title and Migara Jayasinghe of Sri Lanka the Under 14 title. The youngest ever WYSC player Ronnie Bennet won the under 8 title. The under 10 and under 12 titles were secured by Pese Alo and Shrinidi Prakash.

High Word went to Javeria Mirza (Pakistan), SHUNTERS (158) High Game went to Sinatarn Pattanasuwanna for 640.

== WYSC 2011 : Johor Baru, Malaysia ==
| Place | Player | Country |
|---|---|---|
| 1st | Anand Bharadwaj | Australia |
| 2nd | Victor Gwee | Singapore |
| 3rd | Michael McKenna | Australia |
| 4th | Yeshan Jayasuriya | Sri Lanka |
| 5th | Premkumar Nimalan | Sri Lanka |
| 6th | Oliver Garner | United Kingdom |
| 7th | Sinatarn Pattanasuwanna | Thailand |
| 8th | Mohd Bin Abdul Suma | Philippines |
| 9th | Jessica Pratesi | United Kingdom |
| 10th | Somphong Phosai | Thailand |

WYSC 2011 took place in the same location as 2007 and 2009: The Zon Regency Hotel, Malaysia. This year produced the youngest ever WYSC champion, Anand Bharadwaj who was a mere 11 years old at the time. In the process Australia became the second country to have had a representative win WYSC more than once (2006/2011) the other country being Malaysia (2009/2010). Michael McKenna (Australia) placed 3rd, making it his second 3rd placing in his years at WYSC (2009/2011). Jessica Pratesi placed in 9th position for the second year running, Mohd Suma retained his 8th position from 2010. Anand also stayed in the first position for longer than any other player, leading the tournament for eleven rounds. 2011 was the first year that there were no competitors who had played in every single WYSC. The pre-WYSC trivia tournament that ran in 2009 and 2010 did not run in 2011.

== WYSC 2010 : Manila, Philippines ==
| Place | Player | Country |
|---|---|---|
| 1st | Ker Jen Ho | Malaysia |
| 2nd | Preedee Khongthanarat | Thailand |
| 3rd | William Kang | Malaysia |
| 4th | Oluwafemi Akinlosotu | Nigeria |
| 5th | Kitty-Jean Laginha | Australia |
| 6th | Tawan Paepolsiri | Thailand |
| 7th | Vinnith Ramamurti | Malaysia |
| 8th | Mohd Bin Abdul Suma | Philippines |
| 9th | Jessica Pratesi | England |
| 10th | Looi Yih Feng | Malaysia |

Ker Jen Ho of Malaysia became the second player from Malaysia to win the championship. Compatriot William Kang became second runner up and under 16 champion. Malaysia had four players in the top 10 while Cheong Yi Hua also of Malaysia, finished in 19th position and received the encouragement award for her well-above-expectation result. Irwin Goh of Malaysia received the Paulette Yeoh Award for his strong behind-the-scenes helping of the tournament. The pre-tournament trivia competition ran again in 2010 and the winning team was "SAM GUN" which consisted of Kim Rubina (Philippines), Arvinran Rajendran (Malaysia) and Shahroz Zamir (Pakistan).

Victor Gwee of Singapore became the Under 14 World Scrabble Champion while Migara Jayasinghe of Sri Lanka and Jessie Hannah David of Qatar became the under 12 and under 10 champions respectively.

This was the first WYSC to have more than 1 female finish in the top ten Kitty-Jean Laginha (Australia) and Jessica Pratesi (England). Jessica also shared the high word award with Pranav Kaarthik. Host country the Philippines had a player in the top ten for the first time. (Mohd Bin Abdul Suma). 4 ladies made it to play at Table 1 during the tournament. They were: Sirinapa Srinornil (Thailand), Natasha Podesser (Australia), Kitty-Jean Laginha (Australia) and Jessica Pratesi (England). This the first time more than one female had played on table 1 with the exclusion of Game 1.

Finally, Natasha Podesser of Australia was the only player to have played in all 4 previous WYSC tournaments. However, being 17 years old, she will be too old to compete in any further WYSC's. Oluwafemi Akinlosotu of Nigeria held the lead of the tournament for the first thirteen games.

== WYSC 2009 : Johor Baru, Malaysia ==
| Place | Player | Country |
|---|---|---|
| 1st | Suanne Ong | Malaysia |
| 2nd | Alastair Richards | Australia |
| 3rd | Michael McKenna | Australia |
| 4th | Preedee Khongthanarat | Thailand |
| 5th | Charnrit Khongthanarat | Thailand |
| 6th | Oluwaseun Oyeleke | Nigeria |
| 7th | Wong Zhi Yuan | Singapore |
| 8th | Wanchana Jirapitikul | Thailand |
| 9th | Goutham Jayaraman | Singapore |
| 10th | Charas Worapotpisut | Thailand |

The 2009 WYSC was held in the Zon Regency Hotel, Johor Bahru as part of the Iskandar Malaysia World Festival of Scrabble. Unlike previous years of WYSC which featured 22 games over 3 days and a best out of 5 playoffs; the 2009 WYSC was a 24-game tournament held over 3 days without any final play-off. The World Youth Scrabble Championships of 2009 was held from Tuesday, 8 December to Thursday, 10 December. 2009 WYSC had a record number of entrants of over 80. Members of the Malaysian monarchy were present for the prize giving ceremony. The Princess of Malaysia personally congratulated each of the prize winners.

Suanne Ong of Malaysia became the first girl to win the World Youth Scrabble Championship. As at 2017, she remains the only girl to have held the title.

== WYSC 2008 : Georgetown, Malaysia ==
| Place | Player | Country |
|---|---|---|
| 1st | Charnrit Khongthanarat | Thailand |
| 2nd | Darren Khoo Beng Way | Malaysia |
| 3rd | Scott Chung | Malaysia |
| 4th | Ramaraj Sundraraj | Malaysia |
| 5th | Suanne Ong | Malaysia |
| 6th | Mohsin Ahmed | India |
| 7th | Wanchana Jirapitikul | Thailand |
| 8th | Samitha Amarasinghe | Sri Lanka |
| 9th | Alastair Richards | Australia |
| 10th | Akaradech Suppapitta | Thailand |

WYSC 2008 took place in Georgetown Penang, Malaysia

== WYSC 2007 : Johor Baru, Malaysia ==
| Place | Player | Country |
|---|---|---|
| 1st | Toh Weibin | Singapore |
| 2nd | Sean Chung Chin Shiu | Malaysia |
| 3rd | Ong Suanne | Malaysia |
| 4th | Liew Kian Boon | Singapore |
| 5th | Pasit Natearpha | Thailand |
| 6th | Benjamin Chow | Singapore |
| 7th | Ian Tay Zhi Xian | Malaysia |
| 8th | Charas Worrapotpisut | Thailand |
| 9th | Lee Guan Hui | Singapore |
| 10th | Imron Sawamipak | Thailand |

The 2007 WYSC took place on 4–6 December 2007 in Johor Bahru, Malaysia.

== Inaugural WYSC (2006) : Wollongong, Australia ==
| Place | Player | Country |
|---|---|---|
| 1st | David Eldar | Australia |
| 2nd | Austin Shin | England |
| 3rd | Will Nediger | Canada |
| 4th | Joshua Sng | Singapore |
| 5th | Benjamin Chow | Singapore |
| 6th | Toh Weibin | Singapore |
| 7th | Thacha Koowirat | Thailand |
| 8th | Tanasak Supaphibunk | Thailand |
| 9th | Sherwin Rodrigues | India |
| 10th | Lee Guan Hui | Singapore |

David Eldar of Australia became the first World Youth Scrabble Champion when he won the inaugural event that look place at Wollongong University, Wollongong, Australia in 2006.

== See also ==
- World Scrabble Championship
- Canadian Scrabble Championship
- Brand's Crossword Game King's Cup
- National Scrabble Championship
- National School Scrabble Championship
