= Conrad Bassett-Bouchard =

American Scrabble player

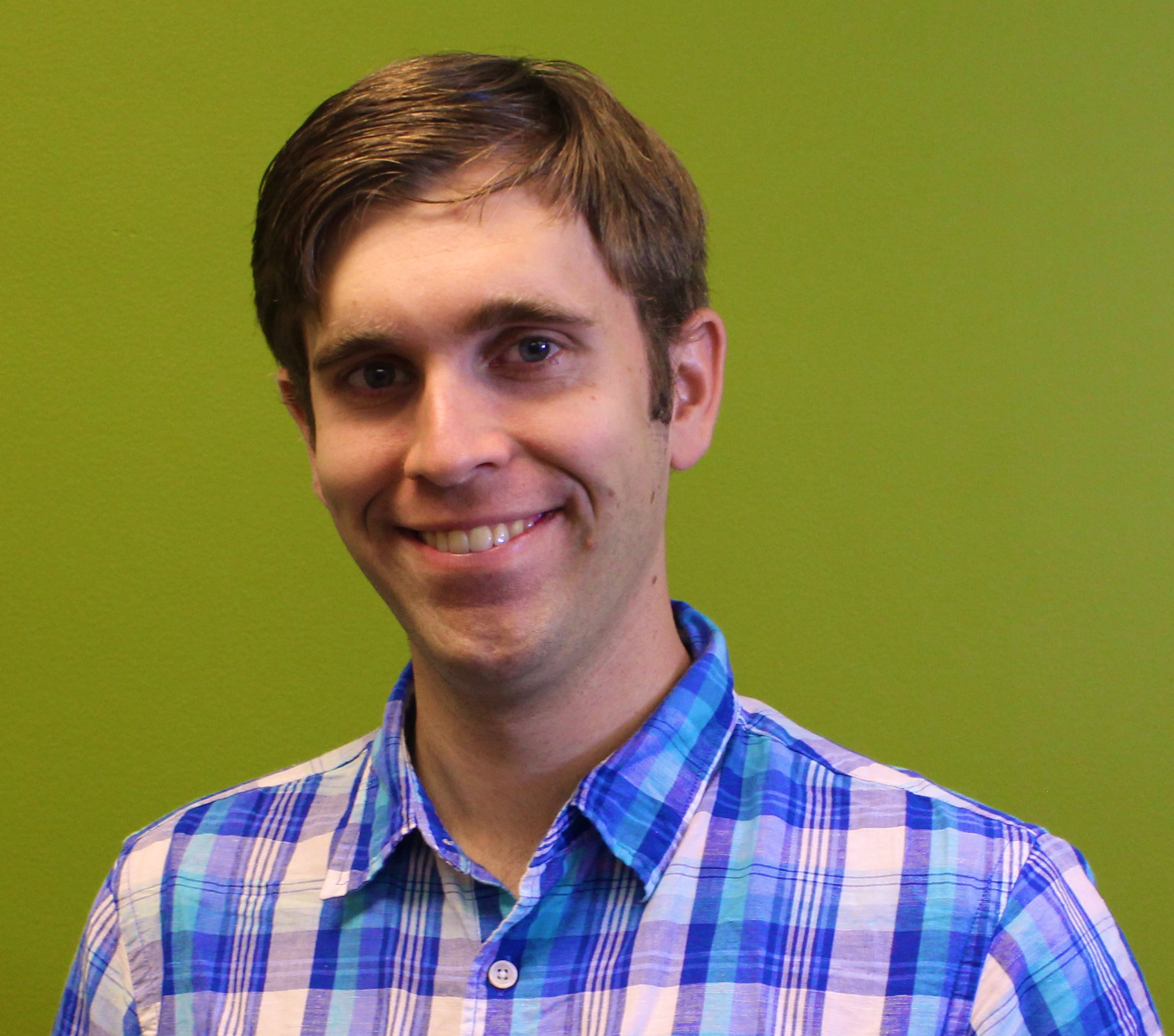
Conrad Bassett-Bouchard in 2016

Conrad Bassett-Bouchard is an American Scrabble player who won the 2014 National Scrabble Championship. That year, Conrad won 22 out of 31 games and defeated Jason Li to win the grand prize of $10,000. Bassett-Bouchard began his Scrabble career in 2004 and has since won over 1,100 games and over $29,000 while compiling a winning percentage of .629.

== Personal life ==
Outside of Scrabble, Bassett-Bouchard is a user experience designer at Google. Originally from Moraga, California, Bassett-Bouchard is a graduate of Campolindo High School, the University of California, San Diego, and Carnegie Mellon University. As of 2020, he resides in Portland, Oregon with his husband Brandon Zuel.
