= Will Anderson (Scrabble player) =

American Scrabble player (born 1984)

- Born: September 13, 1984 (age 42)
- Occupation: Scrabble player

YouTube information
- Channel: Will Anderson
- Subscribers: 72.5 thousand
- Views: 20.5 million
- Last updated: August 3, 2026

Will Anderson (born September 13, 1984) is an American Scrabble player and YouTuber. He was the North American national champion in 2017, winning 25 out of 31 games, finishing ahead of runner-up Mack Meller.

Anderson is also one of the most prominent Scrabble YouTubers. His channel primarily covers famous games and moments in Scrabble history, notably matches by Scrabble juggernaut Nigel Richards, against whom Anderson has a rare positive record.

Anderson is from Croton-on-Hudson, New York. Outside Scrabble, he works as a textbook editor.
