= Yeehaw =

Ya haw or Yee-haw may refer to:

- "Yee Haw", a song by Jake Owen
- "Yee Haw", a song by The BossHoss
- Yeehaw Junction, Florida
- "Yee-Haw", a phrase commonly associated with Cowboys and the Southern United States

== See also ==
- "Yihaa", a 2025 song by Dolly Style
- Rebel yell
- Yahoo (disambiguation)
