= Michael McKenna (Scrabble player) =

Australian Scrabble player

- Education: Australian National University (ANU)
- Awards: 2012 World Youth Scrabble Championship

Michael McKenna is an Australian Scrabble player and world record holder who won the 2012 World Youth Scrabble Championships. He attends and is employed by the Australian National University.

== Scrabble ==
=== Records ===
McKenna currently holds the record for the highest combined score in tournament Scrabble of 1210 with Edward Okulicz (489–721). Together with Alastair Richards, he broke the world record for the highest number of points scored by two Scrabble players within 24 hours of 170,682 in July 2012, but that record was beaten in November of that year.

=== Youth ===
- 2012 World Youth Scrabble Champion

=== Open ===
- 2013 Australian representative at the World Scrabble Championship, finishing 87th

== Education ==
McKenna works at and attends the Australian National University, where he is an academic in their School of Political Science and International Relations, and a student in the College of Engineering and Computer Science
