= Robert Watson (Scrabble player) =

American Scrabble player

Robert Watson was the American 1988 National Scrabble Championship champion. He subsequently retired from tournament Scrabble to pursue other interests, including medicine.

Watson, of Edina, Minnesota, began playing Scrabble after memorizing three and four-letter words to play Boggle and was skilled at bluffing. He beat Joel Wapnick in the final of the 1988 US championship.
