= Scrabble Players Championship =

Scrabble competition

The Scrabble Players Championship (formerly the North American Scrabble Championship, the US Scrabble Open, and the National Scrabble Championship) is the largest Scrabble competition in North America. Organized by NASPA Games, the event is currently held every year, and from 2004 through 2006 the finals were aired on ESPN and ESPN2. The 2026 event was held in Cedar Rapids from July 18-22, 2026, with Mack Meller emerging as two-time champion.

== History ==
The first officially sanctioned Scrabble tournaments in the U.S. were spearheaded, organized and run by Joel Skolnick in the mid-1970s. Skolnick was a recreation director for the New York City Department of Parks and Recreation. He approached Selchow and Righter in late 1972, and the first tournament, open to Brooklyn residents only, commenced on March 18, 1973. The Funk and Wagnalls Collegiate Dictionary was used to rule on challenges, and the official word judge was Skolnick's then-wife Carol. Carol's sister, Shazzi Felstein, who would later finish in ninth place at the first North American Invitational tournament, won the first preliminary round with 1,321 points over three games. The final round took place on April 15, 1973, and Jonathan Hatch was the winner of the first official Scrabble tournament.

The summer of 1973 saw two more tournaments, held respectively at Grossingers (won by Minerva Kasowitz) and the Concord hotel (won by Harriet Zucker) in New York's Catskill region. Another two tournaments quickly followed in November that same year: in Baltimore, Gordon Shapiro topped approximately 400 contestants; and at the Brooklyn War Memorial approximately 2,000 people entered the nine weekly preliminary rounds of the first all–New York City Scrabble Championship. It was won by Bernie Wishengrad. The New York City Championship was thereafter held annually, jointly sponsored by Selchow and Righter and the NYC Department of Parks and Recreation.

The first national tournament was the North American Invitational, held May 19–21, 1978, in the Presidential Suite of the Loews Summit Hotel in New York City. Joel Skolnick and Carol Felstein, as usual, served as the tournament director and word judge, respectively. David Prinz took the $1,500 first prize, followed by Dan Pratt and Mike Senkiewicz.

In 1980, soon after the publication of the first Official Scrabble Players Dictionary, control of the national tournament passed to the National Scrabble Association. They continued to organize the tournament until 2008.

The tournament was previously called National Scrabble Championship, except in 2006 when it was named US Scrabble Open. In 2015, to recognize the longtime eligibility of Canadian members, it was renamed North American Scrabble Championship. In 2022 it was renamed Scrabble Players Championship.

Since 2009, the tournament has been organized annually by NASPA Games (formerly known as North American Scrabble Players Association). The first event under NASPA was held in Dayton, Ohio, in August 2009. Since then, the championships have been held in various U.S. cities (chosen more or less based on a rotation between five regions: southeast, southwest, northeast, northwest, and central).

The 2020 and 2021 events were canceled due to the COVID-19 pandemic. The 2022 event, the first under the new SPC identity, was held in Baltimore on July 23–27, and was won by Michael Fagen, a data analyst from Quebec.

The Scrabble Players Championship uses the NASPA Word List (NWL, formerly Official Tournament and Club Word List, referred to as OTCWL, OWL, TWL) as the official word authority for play. Beginning in 2012, an additional division was included for international-English play using the Collins Scrabble Words (CSW) list.

=== Collins ===
The first Collins division in 2012 was won by Sam Kantimathi with a 24–7 record, although Kantimathi was caught palming tiles at the 2013 championship and suspended from tournament play for four years. In 2013, John O'Laughlin, creator of the Quackle software program, won the division with a 24–7 record, winning $2,500 and claiming his first NSC divisional title. Past world, national, and Canadian champion Adam Logan won the division easily in 2014 with a 23–4 record and four byes. Peter Armstrong prevailed over past champion Dave Wiegand in 2015, winning 3–2 in the final best-of-five series. David Eldar won the division in 2016 with a 27–4 record, beating past champion Logan by a six-game margin. Austin Shin won the top division in 2017 with a 22–9 record, prevailing over runner-up Dave Wiegand in the final round; this was the first year that Collins players were divided into two divisions. Austin repeated his win in 2022, defeating Waseem Khatri from Pakistan in a 5-game playoff.

=== Youth ===
Rafi Stern won division 3 of the 2006 National Championship, posting a 20–8 record. Joey Krafchick out of Georgia won division 5 at the 2007 Players' Championship with a 25.5-5.5 record, followed by Bradley Robbins from New Hampshire winning division 6 going 24–4 in 2008. In 2010, Richard Spence of Arizona won Division 4 with a 25.5–5.5 record, and in 2011, won Division 2 with a 25–6 record. In 2012, Amalan Iyengar of North Carolina won Division 4 with a 22–9 record. Also in 2012, Chris Canik of Texas won Division 3 with a 26–5 record, the best record in that division's history. In 2013, Andy Hoang of North Carolina won Division 3 with a 23–8 record. Bradley Robbins and Andy Hoang are the only people to have won both the National School Scrabble Championship (2010 for Robbins, 2009 and 2012 for Hoang) and a division in the National Scrabble Championship (2008, Division 6 for Robbins & 2013, Division 3 for Hoang). Mack Meller of New York placed seventh in Division 1 in 2013. He started the 2014 event with a 7–0 record, giving him first place in Division 1 after the first day of the event, and again finished seventh overall.

== Past events and Division 1 winners ==
=== NASPA Word List (NWL/OTCWL/OWL/OSPD) ===
Year	Winner	Location	Region	Entrants	Winner's prize	Total prize pool
2027		New Orleans	SE			
2026	(Kentucky) Mack Meller (2)	Cedar Rapids	C	242	USD 10,000	
2025	(Oregon) Nigel Peltier	Hanover	NE	256	USD 10,000	USD 44,750
2024	(Kentucky) Mack Meller (1)	South Bend	C	251	USD 10,000	USD 45,300
2023	(Quebec) Josh Sokol	Las Vegas	SW	239	USD 10,000	USD 43,750
2022	(Quebec) Michael Fagen	Baltimore	NE	244	USD 10,000	USD 42,200
2019	(Washington (state)) Alec Sjöholm	Reno	NW	249	USD 10,000	no current data
2018	(New York (state)) Joel Sherman (2)	Buffalo	NE	403	USD 10,000	USD 52,000
2017	(Pennsylvania) Will Anderson	New Orleans	SE	365	USD 10,000	USD 54,350
2016	(South Carolina) David Gibson (2)	Fort Wayne	C	417	USD 10,000	USD 49,275
2015	(Ontario) Matthew Tunnicliffe	Reno	NW	340	USD 10,000	USD 50,225
2014	(California) Conrad Bassett-Bouchard	Buffalo	NE	524	USD 10,000	USD 45,775
2013	(New Zealand) Nigel Richards (5)	Las Vegas	SW	521	USD 10,000	USD 43,725
2012	(New Zealand) Nigel Richards (4)	Orlando	SE	339	USD 10,000	USD 36,150
2011	(New Zealand) Nigel Richards (3)	Dallas	S	329	USD 10,000	USD 42,075
2010	(New Zealand) Nigel Richards (2)	Dallas	S	408	USD 10,000	USD 42,075
2009	(Oregon) Dave Wiegand (2)	Dayton	C	486	USD 10,000	USD 43,175
2008	(New Zealand) Nigel Richards (1)	Orlando	SE	662	USD 25,000	USD 85,385
2007	(British Columbia) James Leong	Dayton	C	451	USD 12,000	USD 85,385
2006	(Minnesota) Jim Kramer	Phoenix	SW	625	USD 25,000	USD 85,385
2005	(Oregon) Dave Wiegand (1)	Reno	SW	682	USD 25,000	USD 85,415
2004	(Texas) Trey Wright	New Orleans	S	837	USD 25,000	USD 92,805
2002	(New York (state)) Joel Sherman (1)	San Diego	SW	696	USD 25,000	USD 89,290
2000	(Michigan) Joe Edley (3)	Providence	NE	598	USD 25,000	USD 89,290
1998	(Illinois) Brian Cappelletto	Chicago	C	535	USD 25,000	USD 82,200
1996	(Ontario) Adam Logan	Dallas	S	412	USD 25,000	USD 75,485
1994	(South Carolina) David Gibson (1)	Los Angeles	SW	294	USD 15,000	USD 50,585
1992	(Michigan) Joe Edley (2)	Atlanta	SE	315	USD 10,000	USD 35,910
1990	(Tennessee) Robert Felt	Washington	E	282	USD 10,000	USD 37,400
1989	(Michigan) Peter Morris	New York	NE	221	USD 5,000	USD 24,425
1988	(Minnesota) Robert Watson	Reno	SW	315	USD 5,000	USD 23,100
1987	(New York (state)) Rita Norr	Las Vegas	SW	327	USD 5,000	USD 16,850
1985	(Florida) Ron Tiekert	Boston	NE	302	USD 10,000	USD 52,370
1983	(Quebec) Joel Wapnick	Chicago	C	32	USD 5,000	USD 13,600
1980	(Michigan) Joe Edley (1)	Santa Monica	SW	32	USD 5,000	USD 10,100
1978	(New York (state)) David Prinz	New York	NE	65 (invitational)	USD 1,500	USD 8,400

=== Collins Scrabble Words (CSW) ===
Year	Winner	Location	Entrants	Divisions	Winner's prize	Total prize pool
2026	(Virginia) Joshua Castellano (2)	Cedar Rapids	38	2		
2025	(Washington (state)) Alec Sjöholm	Hanover	48	2	USD 4,000	USD 10,550
2024	(Virginia) Joshua Castellano (1)	South Bend	35	1	USD 4,000	USD 8,550
2023	(Nigeria) Wellington Jighere	Las Vegas, NV	47	1	USD 4,000	USD 8,500
2022	(United Kingdom) Austin Shin (2)	Baltimore	34	1	USD 3,000	USD 5,850
2019	(New York (state)) Jesse Day	Reno	35	1	USD 3,000	USD 5,850
2018	(Washington (state)) Evans Clinchy	Buffalo	73	2	USD 4,000	USD 10,000
2017	(United Kingdom) Austin Shin (1)	New Orleans	64	2	USD 4,250	USD 10,550
2016	(Australia) David Eldar	Fort Wayne	44	1	USD 2,500	USD 6,000
2015	(California) Peter Armstrong	Reno	48	1	USD 2,500	USD 6,000
2014	(Ontario) Adam Logan	Buffalo	63	1	USD 2,500	USD 5,775
2013	(California) John O'Laughlin	Las Vegas	40	1	USD 2,500	USD 4,700
2012	(California) Sam Kantimathi	Orlando	38	1	USD 1,500	USD 3,450

== See also ==
- World Scrabble Championship
- Canadian Scrabble Championship
- National Scrabble Championship (UK)
- Brand's Crossword Game King's Cup
- World Youth Scrabble Championships
- National School Scrabble Championship
