= Josh Sokol (Scrabble player) =

Canadian Scrabble player

Joshua Sokol
- Born: Joshua Sokol-Rubenstein
- Other name: axcertypo
- Occupations: Scrabble player; influencer
- Years active: 2013–present

Joshua Sokol-Rubenstein is a Canadian competitive Scrabble player and influencer. He won the 2023 Scrabble Players Championship.

== Career ==
Sokol has said Scrabble was his parents' "favourite board game" and began memorizing obscure words for the game as a child. He joined the Montreal Scrabble Club at age 10 and soon began seriously competing. He has played at the Scrabble Players Championship (formerly North American Scrabble Championship) since 2013. He excelled at the Scrabble Players Championship in Las Vegas in 2023, with a 23–5 record going into the finals (four games ahead of anyone else), where he then won 3–2. He was the second Montrealer in a row to win the tournament after Michael Fagen the previous year.

Sokol has described himself as a "Scrabble influencer". He started livestreaming on Twitch in 2020 and has uploaded hundreds of YouTube videos under the username axcertypo. He has also commentated for Scrabble tournament livestreams.
