= Jim Kramer =

American Scrabble player (born 1958)

Jim Kramer accepts $25,000 check for winning the U.S. Scrabble Open in Phoenix, Arizona, August 9, 2006

Jim Kramer (born 1958) is an American Scrabble player who won the 2006 United States Scrabble Open in Phoenix, Arizona. Kramer has competed in 15 U.S. championship Scrabble tournaments and has represented the U.S. at the World Scrabble Championships six times. Before winning in 2006, he had top-ten finishes in the national championships in 1998, 2000, and 2005. His fifth-place finish at the 2003 World Championship (WSC) was the highest by any North American player that year. He finished third in 2001.

A resident of Roseville, Minnesota, Kramer is nicknamed "Gentleman Jim" in Scrabble circles. Since his career began in 1983, he has played at least 2,500 tournament games, winning about 64% of the time. He has won at least $54,000 in prize money.

On November 17, 2006, Kramer was invited to compete against "Genius", a computer Scrabble opponent running the newest version of RealNetworks' Scrabble. In a three-round "Man v. Machine" match at the Westlake Mall in Seattle, Genius won the first game, 466 to 419. Kramer took the second game, 417 to 406. The deciding, third game came down to the last play, and Kramer won it, 442 to 441, taking home $10,000.
