= Chrystal Rose =

British television personality

- Known for: The Chrystal Rose Show
- Children: Louise Rose
- Website: chrystalrose.co.uk/chrystal-rose

Chrystal Rose is best known as a British television personality who was the first woman of any nationality to host an eponymous TV talk show in the UK, The Chrystal Rose Show, produced by Carlton Television and broadcast on ITV from 1993 to 1996, 103 shows. She is also the mother of Louise Rose who was in the pop band Precious who competed in the 1999 Eurovision Song Contest.

== Biography ==
In 1984, Chrystal Rose won third place in a Channel 4 screenplay writing competition with her original script, "The Fine Edge of Friendship".

Her first novel, What a Bitch, was published in 1996 by Fourth Estate.

Rose's background is in television, where she worked as a producer and presenter. In 1990, she funded her own pilots and created a talk show commissioned and aired on Carlton TV. The Chrystal Show ran for four series, alongside Chrystal’s Style Guide, a series that helped people look good for less.

Chrystal was a Director of Spotlight Promotions, producing major public events, exhibitions, concerts and managed budgets upwards of £500,000, writing business plans and forecasts. She has owned a clothing boutique in Central London and has a line of clothes and accessories on her own label.

Chrystal has written the novel, 40 Faking Fabulous and the book, “How To Make A Film”, which follows her progress of getting “40 Faking Fabulous” from novel to the big screen.

She has headed negotiations in licensing agreements with British and American companies

Her game, “Flash & Furious” retails in stores throughout the US including Target.

Chrystal wrote the lyrics for the original songs on the sound track for “40 Faking Fabulous”.

== Hobbies ==
Chrystal Rose plays competitive Scrabble. She is a member of the London Scrabble League and she has competed in major UK Scrabble tournaments in 2008, 2014 and 2025. Chrystal was featured in the 2004 tournament Scrabble documentary "Lost for Words".
