= Word Freak =

2001 book by Stefan Fatsis

- Book cover
- Author: Stefan Fatsis
- Language: English
- Subject: Scrabble
- Genre: Non-fiction, memoir
- Publisher: Houghton Mifflin
- Publication date: 2001
- Media type: Print
- Pages: 372 (hardcover)
- ISBN: 0-618-01584-1

Word Freak is a nonfiction narrative by Stefan Fatsis published in 2001 (ISBN 0-618-01584-1).

The book is subtitled Heartbreak, Triumph, Genius, and Obsession in the World of Competitive Scrabble Players. Fatsis, a sports reporter for The Wall Street Journal, introduces the reader to the world of competitive Scrabble through a narrative of his slow transformation from "a good living room player" into a player ranked as expert by the National Scrabble Association. His humorous approach and descriptions of fellow competitive Scrabble players are interspersed with game strategies as the reader follows his ascent through the ranks of tournament players. The book also covers the game's history, how tournaments are run, and the politics of the Scrabble scene. Word Freak is a New York Times Bestseller and New York Times Notable Book.

A 10th-anniversary paperback edition of Word Freak came out in 2011. The new edition (18th printing) includes a new 30-page afterword about what's happened to the game in the last decade: where-are-they-now on the main characters, here-they-are-now on the new generation of players, corporate politics, dictionary changes, and much more. The new edition has the same ISBN as the original, but is distinguished by a "10th Anniversary Edition" logo on the lower right of the front cover.

The documentary film Word Wars (2004), while not directly related to the book, includes many of the same players.
