= David Gibson (Scrabble player) =

American Scrabble player (1951–2019)

David Lawrence Gibson (February 8, 1951 – November 22, 2019) was an American professional Scrabble player and mathematics professor. Ranked the top player in North America and widely regarded as one of the greatest Scrabble players, Gibson won the North American Scrabble Championship twice.

== Early life ==
The eldest of three children, David Lawrence Gibson was born in 1951 in Raleigh, North Carolina and raised in Charlotte, North Carolina, where his parents owned an auto parts locating company. A graduate of North Mecklenburg High School and Furman University, he excelled in mathematics but fared considerably poorly in English. In 1975, Gibson and his family moved to Spartanburg, South Carolina.

== Career ==
Gibson was introduced to Scrabble at age 6. He began playing tournament Scrabble in 1983 and won the North American Scrabble Championship (NASC) in August 1994; although he had kept a relatively low profile in the Scrabble community, the win propelled him to No. 1 in the North American rankings. In 1995, Gibson won the "Scrabble Superstars" tournament and its top prize of $50,000. Gibson finished second in the 2012 NASC; only needing to lose by fewer than 169 points to win the title, he ended up losing 298–475 in the final round against Nigel Richards. In 2016, Gibson won his second NASC title in Fort Wayne, Indiana. The term "Gibsonization" for a process of pairings in a single-elimination final was named after Gibson due to his tendency to clinch tournaments before their final rounds. Gibson also taught mathematics for some four decades at the Spartanburg Methodist College, and was awarded with an honorary distinction of professor emeritus by the college in early 2019.

== Death ==
Gibson died aged 68 on November 22, 2019, due to complications from stage four pancreatic cancer.

== Major championship wins ==
| No. | Date | Tournament | Winning score | Cumulative spread | Runner(s)-up |
|---|---|---|---|---|---|
| 1 | August 13, 1994 | North American Scrabble Championship | 23-4 | +1700 | (United States) Dave Wiegand |
| 2 | August 21, 1995 | Superstar Showdown | 21-3 | +1894 | (United States) Brian Cappelletto |
| 3 | August 16, 2003 | All Stars Championship | 12-6 | +217 | (United States) Ron Tiekert |
| 4 | August 6, 2016 | North American Scrabble Championship (2) | 24-7 | +2004 | (United States) Ian Weinstein |
