= World Scrabble Championship 2003 =

Word Game Championship Contest

- 21 October 2003 – 24 October 2003
- Winner: Panupol Sujjayakorn
- Number of players: 90
- Location: Kuala Lumpur
- Sponsor: Mattel

The World Scrabble Championship 2003 was held in the Corus Hotel, Kuala Lumpur, Malaysia. The winner was Panupol Sujjayakorn of Thailand.

The format was notably different from previous WSCs. The tournament began with the Australian Draw system, with each player playing sixteen games over two days. On the third day the players played eight games in a King Of the Hill format. After this, the top two players competed in a best-of-five final to decide who would be the seventh World Scrabble Champion.

Prize money started at $17,500 for the winner, with all the top twenty players receiving prizes down to $200.

== Results ==
The winner was Panupol Sujjayakorn of Thailand. This was the first time that a player won the WSC while representing a country for which English is not the first language.

== Complete Results ==
Position	Name	Country	Win–loss	Spread	Prize (USD)
1	Sujjayakorn, Panupol	Thailand	18–6	+1461	17,500
2	Nemitrmansuk, Pakorn	Thailand	17–7	+1383	8,500
3	Perry, Andrew	England	17–7	+1202	4,000
4	Nyman, Mark	England	16–8	+975	2,500
5	Kramer, Jim	United States	16–8	+712	1,750
6	Panyasophonlert, Komol	Thailand	16–8	+418	1,000
7	Davis, Andrew	England	16–8	+188	750
8	Fernando, Naween Tharanga	Sri Lanka	15–9	+613	600
9	Allan, Paul	Scotland	15–9	+532	500
10	Adamson, Tim	United States	15–0	+438	400
11	Helen Gipson	England	15–9	+317	300
12	Geary, Jim	United States	15–9	+198	300
13	Grant, Jeff	New Zealand	15–9	-58	300
14	Appleby, Phil	England	14½–9½	+424	300
15	Litunya, Patrick	Kenya	14–10	+1043	300
16	Boys, David	Canada	14–10	+843	200
17	Wapnick, Joel	Canada	14–10	+690	200
18	Sanni, Moshood Olasunkanmi	Nigeria	14–10	+581	200
19	Cleary, Paul Stephen	Australia	14–10	+436	200
20	Warner, Howard	New Zealand	14–10	+316	200
21	Bhandarkar, Akshay	Bahrain	14–10	+315	
22	Asirvatham, Ganesh	Malaysia	14–10	+144	
23	Sim, Tony	Singapore	14–10	-9	
24	Lipton, Bob	United States	13½–10½	+541	
25	Carter, Patrick	New Zealand	13½–10½	+229	
26	Hersom, Randy	United States	13–11	+738	
27	Dennis, Di	England	13–11	+537	
28	O'Laughlin, John	United States	13–1	+360	
29	Fisher, Andrew	Australia	13–11	+286	
30	Kurnia, Andy	Singapore	13–11	+270	
31	Linn, Robert	United States	13–11	+251	
32	Williams, Gareth	Wales	13–11	+132	
33	Delicata, David	Malta	13–11	+80	
34	Balogun, Rasheed Olajide	Nigeria	13–11	-55	
35	Capuno, Leonardo	Philippines	13–11	-161	
36	Lobo, Ralph	Oman	13–11	-195	
37	Golding, Andrew	Canada	13–11	-357	
38	Polatnick, Steve	United States	12½–11½	+226	
39	Jackman, Bob	Australia	12–12	+666	
40	Placca, Chrys	Ghana	12–12	+569	
41	Ikekeregor, Dennis	Nigeria	12–12	+515	
42	Willingham, Walker	United States	12–12	+248	
43	Iqbal, Wajid	Pakistan	12–12	+168	
44	Ndungu, Stanley Njoroge	Kenya	12–12	+126	
45	Berofsky, Evan	Canada	12–12	+58	
46	Kirk, Terry	England	12–12	+11	
47	Khoshnaw, Karl	Kurdistan-Iraq	12–12	-173	
48	Finley, Peter	England	12–12	-267	
49	Anthonius, Ferdy	Indonesia	12–12	-304	
50	Quao, Michael Arthur	Ghana	12–12	-350	
51	Withers, Ben	United States	12–12	-757	
52	Hirai, Keiichiro	Japan	12–12	-794	
53	Hovelmeier, Trevor Mark	South Africa	11½–12½	+929	
54	Lam, John	Malaysia	11½–12½	+120	
55	Wiegand, David	United States	11–13	+367	
56	Pui, Cheng Wui	Malaysia	11–13	+198	
57	Chong, Aaron	Malaysia	11–13	+30	
58	Mamadou, Wone	Kuwait	11–13	-209	
59	Chakrabarti, Amit	United States	11–13	-243	
60	Credo, Ronald	Philippines	11–13	-257	
61	Hoekstra, Ron	Canada	11–13	-297	
62	Holden, Stewart	England	11–13	-328	
63	Lobo, Selwyn	United Arab Emirates	11–13	-342	
64	Abordo, Chris	Bahrain	11–13	-453	
65	Lloyd, David	Australia	11–13	-841	
66	Kenas, Mark	United States	11–13	-947	
67	Gruzd, Steven	South Africa	10½–13½	-270	
68	Talosig, Rogelio	New Zealand	10½–13½	-480	
69	Kamath, Pramit	India	10½–13½	-698	
70	Gongolo, Michael	Kenya	10–14	+675	
71	Kantimathi, Sam	United States	10–14	+89	
72	Baker, Rich	United States	10–14	-92	
73	Saldanha, Dean	Canada	10–14	-272	
74	Recedes, Mario	Philippines	10–14	-467	
75	Gonzalez, Ricardo V	Gulf Champion	10–14	-469	
76	Manase, Joshua Otieno	Kenya	10–14	-542	
77	Kpentey, Bennet	Ghana	9½–14½	-449	
78	Kalumba, Paul Yandisha	Zambia	9–15	-45	
79	John, Robin K.T.	Trinidad and Tobago	9–15	-125	
80	Wanniarachchi, Lakshan	Sri Lanka	9–15	-232	
81	Chicoine, Emanuel	Canada	9–15	-468	
82	Abela, Kevin	Malta	9–15	-844	
83	Chishty, Ishtiaq	Saudi Arabia	9–15	-958	
84	Kuroda, Kunihiko	Japan	8–16	-1201	
85	Sandu, Dan Laurentiu	Romania	8–16	-651	
86	Abordo, Ferrer	Bahrain	8–16	-799	
87	Bohbot, Herve	France	8–16	-844	
88	Saeyorn, Sivanesan	Sri Lanka	8–16	-989	
89	Esmail, Mushtak	Tanzania	7½–16½	-190	
90	Kenny, Bronagh	Ireland	2–22	-3166	

- FINALS:
- Game 1: Panupol 418 – Pakorn 380
- Game 2: Pakorn 495 – Panupol 384
- Game 3: Pakorn 514 – Panupol 470
- Game 4: Panupol 446 – Pakorn 433
- Game 5: Panupol 444 – Pakorn 387
