= Brian Cappelletto =

American Scrabble player (born 1969)

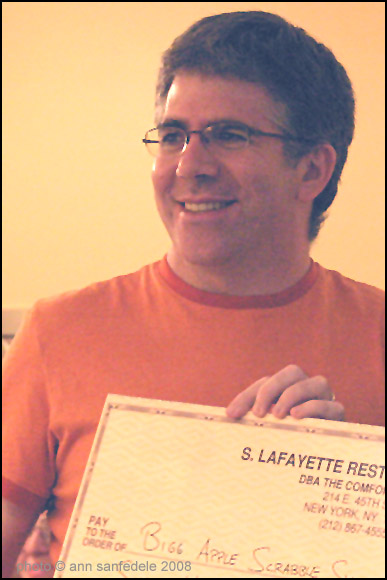
Cappelletto in 2008

Brian Cappelletto (born 1969) is an American Scrabble player. He was the runner-up at the inaugural World Scrabble Championship in 1991 and won the event in 2001. He also won the American National Scrabble Championship in 1998, and was the runner-up in 2008 and 2010.

Cappelletto appeared in Stefan Fatsis's book Word Freak, which follows the stories of several of Scrabble's top players in North America. Fatsis calls him "Scrabble's first child prodigy". The documentary Scrabylon, about the 2001 World Championship, also features Cappelletto as a central character.

Cappelletto first appeared as a Division 1 player at the 1987 National Scrabble Championship, winning 16 of his 21 games and finishing with a winning spread of 1300. He has since appeared at the Championship ten more times, finishing in the top 5 on seven occasions in addition to his 1998 victory. He has not appeared at the World Championship since winning it in 2001. As of June 2010, his NASPA Games rating was 2047, making him the top-rated player in Illinois and the second-highest rated player in the United States.
