= NASPA Games =

Scrabble tournament and club organization

- Predecessor: National Scrabble Association
- Formation: July 1, 2009; 17 years ago
- Headquarters: Dallas, Texas
- Region served: United States & Canada
- Website: https://scrabbleplayers.org
- Formerly called: North American Scrabble Players Association (NASPA)

NASPA Games, formerly known as North American Scrabble Players Association (NASPA), is a nonprofit organization founded in 2009 to administer competitive Scrabble tournaments and clubs in North America. It officially took over these activities from the National Scrabble Association (NSA) on July 1, 2009. As of July 31, 2021, the organization is no longer associated with the North American owner of the Scrabble trademarks, Hasbro.

== Activities ==
NASPA has organized an annual North American championship since taking over from the NSA in 2009, most recently held in July 2024 in South Bend, Indiana. Initially, it was known by its inherited name, the National Scrabble Championship (NSC). In 2015, the championship was officially renamed the North American Scrabble Championship (NASC), in recognition of its significant Canadian membership. In September 2021, the championship was officially renamed the Scrabble Players Championship (SPC), as a consequence of NASPA's dissociation from Hasbro.

Its committees and officers perform a number of tasks, including:

- Administer the organization according to its articles of incorporation.
- Edit and license the NASPA Word List.
- Edit the NASPA Official Tournament Rules.
- Maintain NASPA's official rating system.
- Sanction hundreds of tournaments each year.
- Maintain a roster of officially sanctioned clubs, and certify club and tournament directors.
- Act as the disciplinary body for players and directors.
- Determine policy that affects club and tournament play, and hear appeals to the decisions of other committees.
- Encourage the development of useful software for word study, adjudication, and tournament management.
- The Canadian Committee oversees matters that pertain solely to Canadian NASPA members, such as organizing a biennial Canadian national tournament.

== History ==
The National Scrabble Association (NSA) began promoting school, recreational and adult tournament Scrabble in the late 1970s with financial support from Hasbro. In 2008, Hasbro decided to stop supporting adult tournament Scrabble and clubs by the end of 2009.

A meeting arranged by the NSA and Hasbro executives was held at Hasbro headquarters in suburban Springfield, Massachusetts in December 2008. It was attended by prominent Scrabble players, club and tournament directors, and others from across the continent, including John Chew, Chris Cree, Joe Edley, Ira Freehof, Matt Hopkins, Robert Kahn, Katya Lezin, Seth Lipkin, Mad Palazzo, Steve Pellinen, Mary Rhoades, John Robertson, Sherrie Saint John, Debbie Stegman, Alan Stern, and David Weiss.

The attendees were offered the opportunity to form a new organization to preserve competitive adult Scrabble in North America, and encouraged to do so with Hasbro's blessing but without any funding. The NSA would continue to exist, but would largely focus on its school Scrabble program and promoting recreational play. (It ceased operations on July 1, 2013.)

Most of the attendees accepted Hasbro's challenge and formed the nucleus of the steering committee. An email vote by the steering committee's members determined the new organization's name: North American Scrabble Players Association (NASPA). NASPA was registered in Texas as a not-for-profit corporation and headquartered in Dallas. Chris Cree of Dallas and John Chew of Toronto emerged as co-presidents. Hasbro gave NASPA until the end of 2009 to establish control of the competitive tournament scene, but it was ready for the transition six months early. Accordingly, the first NASPA tournament games were played on July 1, 2009, in three different cities.

As of July 1, 2009, NASPA became the only group in North America permitted to use Hasbro's SCRABBLE trademarks in adult club and tournament play. Other organizations such as the Word Game Players' Organization have existed since 2010 and run their own tournaments, but have been careful to use the Scrabble name only nominatively and thus not to infringe on Hasbro's trademarks.

NASPA later adopted a stricter Code of Conduct, with the goal of improving players' and officials' deportment at Scrabble events. Punishments for misbehavior and cheating at tournaments and clubs have been much swifter and harsher than in the past.

Though it valued its status as Hasbro's officially licensed organization for tournament and club play, NASPA received no operational funding from Hasbro, relying on membership fees, as well as "participation fees" collected by tournament directors, calculated at a fixed rate based on the number of tournament games played.

On July 22, 2021, Chew (now the lone CEO of NASPA, following Cree's decision in 2019 to step back as co-president to become CFO) announced to the membership that NASPA's right to use Hasbro's SCRABBLE trademarks would be terminated as of July 31, 2021. This resulted in a number of organizational changes, including a name change to NASPA Games. The organization intends to continue operations as before, including its annual North American championship, without Hasbro's endorsement. Its new legal disclaimer reads, "SCRABBLE is a trademark of Hasbro, Inc. in the USA and Canada, and of Mattel, Inc. elsewhere. NASPA and its activities are neither endorsed by nor affiliated with Hasbro or Mattel."

== NASPA Word List ==
On July 9, 2020, after some debate and a non-binding survey of members, NAPSA removed 259 "personally applicable offensive slurs" from its tournament and club lexicon, echoing Hasbro's public position. The NASPA Word List, published for members only, continues to differ from the public Official Scrabble Players Dictionary in including other offensive words, generic trademarks, and longer words (up to 15 letters).

An updated NASPA word list released in 2023 reinstated more than 100 of the slurs removed in 2020, to many players' frustration. The 2023 update also included many new inflected forms of existing words that gave players and lexicographers pause.

== NASPA membership types ==
NASPA membership is mandatory for anyone who wishes to compete in sanctioned NASPA tournament play, though NASPA-sanctioned clubs are free to operate independently within the limits of the Code of Conduct. There are several categories of membership:

- One-year regular adult
- One-year youth (under 18)
- Six-month trial
- One-week
- Life

As of June 2013, NASPA had more than 2,500 dues-paid members.

== Championships ==
As National Scrabble Championship:

- 2009 – Dayton, Ohio
- 2010 – Addison, Texas
- 2011 – Addison, Texas
- 2012 – Orlando, Florida
- 2013 – Las Vegas, Nevada
- 2014 – Buffalo, New York

As North American Scrabble Championship:

- 2015 – Reno, Nevada
- 2016 – Fort Wayne, Indiana
- 2017 – New Orleans, Louisiana
- 2018 – Buffalo, New York
- 2019 – Reno, Nevada

As Scrabble Players Championship:

- 2022 – Baltimore, Maryland
- 2023 – Las Vegas, Nevada
- 2024 – South Bend, Indiana
- 2025 – Hanover, Maryland
- 2026 – Cedar Rapids, Iowa

The 2020 and 2021 events, both scheduled for Baltimore, were postponed due to the COVID-19 pandemic.
