= Official Scrabble Players Dictionary =

Word authority for American tournaments

- First edition
- Author: Merriam-Webster, Inc.
- Language: English
- Published: 1978
- Publisher: Merriam-Webster, Inc.
- Publication place: United States
- ISBN: 978-0-87779-596-4 (sixth mass-market-paperback edition)
- Dewey Decimal: 793.734

The Official Scrabble Players Dictionary or OSPD is a dictionary developed for use in the game Scrabble, by speakers of American and Canadian English.

== History ==
=== Background and creation ===
The Official Scrabble Players Dictionary was first published in 1978 through the efforts of the National Scrabble Association (NSA) Dictionary Committee and Merriam-Webster, primarily in response to a need for a word authority for NSA-sanctioned clubs and tournaments. Prior to its publication, Scrabble clubs and tournaments used Funk & Wagnalls Standard College Dictionary as an official word source, but as tournament play grew, this source proved unsatisfactory. The inclusion of foreign words such as "Ja" and "Oui", the exclusion of common words such as "coven" and "surreal", and a lack of clear guidance on the creation of comparative terms, were all problematic for Scrabble players.

Games manufacturers Selchow and Righter, the owners of Scrabble at the time, approached Merriam-Webster Inc. to assist with the compilation of an official Scrabble dictionary. They proposed that words should be included in the new dictionary if they appeared in the five in-print collegiate dictionaries, namely The Random House College Dictionary (1968), The American Heritage Dictionary of the English Language (1969), Webster's New World Dictionary (1970), Merriam-Webster's Collegiate Dictionary (1973) and Funk & Wagnalls (1973). Main entries in the OSPD contain from two to eight letters since those are considered to be the most useful.

The compilation was produced by hand and many errata and omissions were later discovered. For example, the word granola was present in all five nominated dictionaries but not in the OSPD. A second edition, OSPD 2, was released in 1991. The current edition is OSPD 7, released in November 2022.

Although OSPD bears the name Official Scrabble Players Dictionary, no country's competitive organization lists the OSPD as its official dictionary; the NASPA Word List is the official word list for tournament Scrabble in the United States, Canada, Thailand and Israel. Merriam-Webster markets the OSPD as ideal for school and family use.

=== Offensive words ===
In 1993 a Virginia woman found several racial slurs in OSPD 2, including "jew", listed as a verb with the definition "To bargain with – an offensive term". The more conventional sense of "member of a certain ethnoreligious group; Jewish person" was not listed because the dictionary did not include proper nouns. In response to her initial letters to Merriam-Webster and Milton Bradley, her request for the removal of such words was politely declined. Merriam-Webster responded "[the] slurs are part of the language and reputable dictionaries record them as such." Milton Bradley responded "As a dictionary, it is a reflection of words currently used in our language."

She wrote to several social justice organizations, and the National Council of Jewish Women began a letter-writing campaign in support of her cause. Publicity in Jewish media led to the Anti-Defamation League writing to Hasbro chairman Alan Hassenfeld. Hasbro announced that a third edition would be published with racial slurs removed, as well as words like "farted", "fatso", and "boobie". After receiving mostly negative feedback from players, including threats to boycott events, the NSA president announced a compromise. The Official Tournament and Club Word List, the predecessor of today's NASPA Word List, would include the offensive words but not provide definitions. The Official Scrabble Players Dictionary, intended for casual play, would exclude several offensive words.

=== Fourth edition ===
A fourth edition of the dictionary was published by Hasbro in 2005, which contained around 4000 additional words, including strategically useful two-letter words "QI" and "ZA".

=== Fifth edition ===
A fifth edition was published on August 6, 2014. New words include the two-letter words "DA", "GI", "PO", and "TE". A contest to nominate and choose a new word to add to the lexicon was held online, and "GEOCACHE" was voted into the new lexicon.

=== Sixth edition ===
The sixth edition was released on September 24, 2018. 300 new words were added, including "OK", "EW", "ZEN", "EMOJI", "FACEPALM", and "QAPIK".

=== Seventh edition ===
The seventh edition was released on November 15, 2022, adding about 500 new words. Included in this edition are "YEEHAW", "ZOOMER", "BAE", and "DUMPSTER", which was previously considered a trademark.

=== Eighth edition ===
The eighth edition was released on September 28, 2026. There were approximately 200 new additions, including "SKIBIDI", "ELOTE", "KAIJU" "BOBA", "UNC", "POG", "YINZ", and "JAWN".

== See also ==
- Collins Scrabble Words ("CSW", formerly "SOWPODS")
- NASPA Word List ("NWL", formerly "OTCWL", "OWL", "TWL")
