= Robert Felt =

American scrabble player (1953–2002)

Robert Felt (1953–2002) was a computer programmer, USCF-rated chess Expert, Tennessee Junior chess champion, and champion Scrabble player.

Born in Memphis, he entered the University of Chicago in 1971 and tested out of so many requirements that he was awarded Junior status. At the University of Chicago, he was a member of the chess team, at one point being first board on the university's second team for two Pan-American Intercollegiate national tournaments. He also competed for the university at the NCAA national contract bridge tournament.

In 1978, he left university without a degree and joined Banker's Life and Casualty as a computer programmer. At the TDM division of Rand McNally he enjoyed a reputation as one of the best CICS programmers in the world. In the late 1980s and early 1990s, he established 911 systems for police and fire dispatchers. Much of the technology at most 911 call centers is derived from his early work.

In 1990, Felt won the US National Scrabble Championship. He achieved a peak rating of 2155, which in February 2011 would easily be the number one rating again.
