= Collins Scrabble Words =

Tournament Scrabble dictionary

Collins Scrabble Words (CSW, formerly SOWPODS) is the word list used in English-language tournament Scrabble in all countries except the US and Canada, although some Scrabble tournaments in the US and Canada are also organized with divisions that use CSW as their lexicon, some under the auspices of organizations such as the Collins Coalition. The term SOWPODS is an anagram of the two abbreviations OSPD (Official Scrabble Players Dictionary) and OSW (Official Scrabble Words), these being the original official dictionaries used in various parts of the world at the time.

Currently the two main sources for the words making up the combined list (generally known as Collins or CSW) are:

- The British words. Derived from two sources; the Collins English Dictionary and the Collins Corpus, and
- The American words. From the NASPA Word List, formerly Official Tournament and Club Word List, or TWL, derived from the Merriam-Webster's Dictionary and four other collegiate dictionaries. Latest version is NWL2023.

== History ==
History of two-letter words in Collins Scrabble Words

In 1980 in the United Kingdom, the Chambers Dictionary replaced the Shorter Oxford English Dictionary as the official choice for arbitration of the British National Scrabble Championship. In 1988 a single list of all the valid words from Chambers, without the ambiguity of discussing conjugations, declensions and plurals was published for he first time under the title Official Scrabble Words (this would come to be known as OSW). North American Scrabble was using the Official Scrabble Players Dictionary (OSPD), hence when the first World Scrabble Championship took place in 1991 words from either word source were allowed.

Over the following years there was disagreement in the competitive Scrabble community over the desirability of a combined word source, which came to be known as SOWPODS as an easily pronounced anagram of OSW and OSPD. Australia changed all its rated tournaments to using the SOWPODS word list in 1994, while the UK made the same change in 2001. This latter move coincided with the publication of the first official book to contain all words from OSW and OSPD, Chambers' Official Scrabble Words: International Edition.

In December 2003 Collins took over the publication of the official word list sanctioned by the World English-Language Scrabble Players' Association (WESPA). The 7th edition, CSW24, was published in 2024.

The only change from CSW19 to CSW22 was the deletion of 419 words deemed to be hate speech. This is following a directive from Mattel, who committed to ongoing review and removal of words and definitions, removing hate speech from the game and obliging Collins publisher as a licensee to implement these changes. Six more words (3 and their plurals) were removed as hate speech in the transition from CSW22 to CSW24, although two words (1 and its plural) previously removed were added back in.

== Word count ==
CSW24 words by number of letters (Total: 280,887)
Letters	Word count
2	127
3	1,351
4	5,662
5	13,018
6	23,140
7	34,506
8	42,341
9	43,180
10	37,434
11	29,175
12	21,125
13	14,435
14	9,437
15	5,956

== See also ==
- NASPA Word List
