= Joe Edley =

American Scrabble player (born 1947)

- Born: Joseph Edley; 1947 (age 78–79)
- Education: Wayne State University
- Occupations: security guard, author
- Known for: Playing Scrabble
- Notable work: won National Scrabble Championship three times

Joseph Edley (born 1947) is a professional Scrabble player and author, and the first player to win the National Scrabble Championship three times.

== Pre-Scrabble life ==
Joe Edley was born in 1947 and grew up in Detroit, Michigan and he attended Wayne State University, where he concentrated in mathematics and philosophy. In 1969, he moved to San Francisco, California, where he claims to have been influenced by the works of Jane Roberts.

== Scrabble career ==
Having taken the job of a night security guard for the free time it afforded, Edley systematically memorized the first edition of the Official Scrabble Players Dictionary, a feat that only a small minority of top players have accomplished. He played in his first tournaments in California in 1978, performing well but not dominating. Edley has claimed that in preparing for his first national championship, the final key to his success was "controlling my breathing."

Edley won his first National Scrabble Championship in 1980 with a 14–3 record, half a game ahead of Jim Neuberger, although Neuberger had a much higher point spread (which would have been the tiebreaker.) He won additional National Championships in 1992 (22–5) and 2000 (22–9), and is the first player ever to win three National Scrabble Championships. He has also had some lackluster performances, finishing 23rd in both 1987 and 2002, and 17th in 1988. Edley has also never finished higher than third in a World Scrabble Championship, and posted 13–11 and 14–10 records in 1999 and 2001, his most recent World Scrabble Championships.

Since the beginning of his career in 1978, he has played over 4,000 tournament games, winning about 63%, and earning at least $114,000 in prize money.

Edley was hired as an expert consultant for the National Scrabble Association and served as its Director of Clubs and Tournaments from 1988 to 2009. He has published on Amazon.com: ANAGRAMMAR (2011), which is a puzzle book designed specifically to improve the average wordgame player's anagramming ability. He published his first app, Nokori, a puzzle game that can be played by 5-year-olds or on its higher levels challenge Mensa members, late in 2015 and is currently working on a second version, Nokori Dragon (as of May 2016).

== Works ==
- Edley, Joe (1997). The Official Scrabble Puzzle Book. Simon and Schuster. ISBN 0-671-56900-7.
- Edley, Joe; Williams, John D.; Williams Jr., John D. (2001). Everything Scrabble. Simon and Schuster. ISBN 0-671-04218-1.
- Williams, John D.; Edley, Joe (2007). Scrabble A to Z: Everything You Need to Spell Your Way to Victory. Ballantine Books. ISBN 978-0-345-48119-1.
- Edley, Joe (2008). SCRABBLE Puzzles Volume 1. Sterling Publishing Company. ISBN 978-1-4027-5518-7.
- Edley, Joe (2008). SCRABBLE Puzzles Volume 2. Sterling Publishing Company. ISBN 978-1-4027-5519-4.
- Edley, Joe (2008). SCRABBLE Puzzles Volume 3. Sterling Publishing Company. ISBN 978-1-4027-5525-5.
- Edley, Joe (2008). SCRABBLE Puzzles Volume 4. Sterling Publishing Company. ISBN 978-1-4027-5526-2.
