= NASPA Word List =

Abridged Scrabble word list used in North America

NASPA Word List (NWL, formerly Official Tournament and Club Word List, referred to as OTCWL, OWL, TWL) is the official word authority for tournament Scrabble in the US and Canada under the aegis of NASPA Games. It is based on the Official Scrabble Players Dictionary (OSPD) with modifications to make it more suitable for tournament play. Its British and international-English counterpart is Collins Scrabble Words.

== Current edition ==
North American tournament Scrabble currently uses the sixth edition of NWL, officially called NWL2023. The NASPA Games Dictionary Committee created this version in mid-2023 and it took effect on February 29, 2024; it is the third version published autonomously by NASPA rather than by Merriam-Webster under its copyright.

NWL2023 contains every word in the seventh edition of the Official Scrabble Players Dictionary as well as words considered unsuitable for that book (offensive words and trademarks). It also contains words of nine or more letters, unlike the OSPD. It differs from its predecessor, NWL2020, in the introduction of over 4,500 words, including additions to OSPD7, and 11– to 15-letter words from the Canadian Oxford Dictionary 2nd edition (COD2).

== Past editions ==
The decision to bowdlerize the OSPD's third edition by removing a large number of possibly offensive words necessitated a separate, unabridged word list for tournament use. The first edition of OWL was created by the NSA Dictionary Committee, chaired by John Chew, and took effect on March 2, 1998. To avoid controversy, it was available for sale only to NSA members, and unlike the OSPD, did not include definitions. To provide additional value for tournament players, the OWL includes words whose base or inflected forms have up to nine letters, rather than the OSPD's eight.

OSPD3 was created from OSPD2 by adding all appropriate words that had been added to Merriam-Webster's Collegiate Dictionary (MWCD) in the interim; OWL was then formed by restoring the possibly offensive words removed from OSPD3 and adding nine-letter words from MWCD.

The 2014 update OTCWL2014 (Note: also known as OWL3) added several thousand words from two new sources, Oxford Collegiate Dictionary Second Edition (Note: OCD2) and Canadian Oxford Dictionary Second Edition. (Note: COD2)

OTCWL2016, (Note: also known as OWL3.1) a minor update in 2016, added over 1,000 nine-letter words.

The 2018 update NWL2018 (Note: also known as OWL4) added over 3,000 words, including additions to OSPD6 and MWCD, and ten-letter words from COD2. It was produced by NASPA in collaboration with Merriam-Webster, and under its own copyright for the first time.

The 2020 update NWL2020 (Note: also known as OWL5) differed from its predecessor only in the removal of 259 words deemed to be personally applicable offensive slurs, precipitated by rule changes proposed by the North American holder of SCRABBLE trademarks, Hasbro, Inc., in the wake of that year's anti-racism protests.

== Other word authorities ==
Unlike the Official Scrabble Players Dictionary, NWL is a list and does not include definitions. It contains words that are not included in OSPD because they are considered offensive, and a number of other additional words (mostly registered trademarks). Print versions of NWL can be procured from the NASPA website by NASPA members only.

== Word count ==
NWL2023 words by number of letters (total: 196,601)
Letters	Word count
2	107
3	1,085
4	4,247
5	9,476
6	16,706
7	25,473
8	31,736
9	31,229
10	25,028
11	18,735
12	13,515
13	9,323
14	6,102
15	3,839
