= National Scrabble Association =

The National Scrabble Association (NSA) was created in 1978 by Selchow & Righter, then the makers of Scrabble, to promote their game. It coordinated local clubs and Scrabble tournaments in North America, including the National Scrabble Championship, until 2009. The last director was John D. Williams, who is co-author of the book Everything Scrabble.

In July 2009, the coordination of tournaments and competitive clubs was transferred to a new organization, North American Scrabble Players Association (NASPA), now known as NASPA Games. The NSA continued to publish Scrabble News and run programs such as the School Scrabble program.

The National Scrabble Association dissolved on July 1, 2013.

Activities of the association included:

- Organizing and promoting the National Scrabble Championship (through 2008)
- Playing an active role in Scrabble public relations, publicity and promotions
- Developing and promoting the National School Scrabble Program
- Developing and managing the ProLiteracy Worldwide Fund-Raiser Program
- Publishing 8 issues of Scrabble News each year
- Answering questions from consumers and press regarding the game's history, rules, products, etc.
- Advising Hasbro on word games
- Monitoring the media for correct trademark use
- Co-ordinating casual Scrabble clubs
