= 19th century in games =

see also: 18th century in games, 1900s in games

== Games released or invented in the 19th century ==
- The Mansion of Happiness (1843) ~ the first commercially produced game in the US.
- Bell and Hammer (c. 1850).
- The Game of Authors (1861).
- Snakes and ladders (1870)
- Game of the District Messenger Boy, or Merit Rewarded (1886).
- Messenger Boy (1886)
- Game of the Telegraph Boy (1888).
- Chinese Checkers (c. 1893) ~ derived from Halma
- Ludo (1896).
- Reversi (1898) also branded as Annexion or Annexation.

== Significant games-related events in the 19th century ==
- The Milton Bradley Company is founded in Springfield, Massachusetts (1860).
- E.G. Selchow & Co. founded (1867), later changing its name to Selchow and Righter (1880).
- Parker Brothers founded by George S. Parker (1883).
