= Clabber (disambiguation) =

Clabber may refer to:

- Clabber, a card game
- Clabber (food), a food made of curdled milk
- Clabber (horse) (1936–1947) an American Quarter Horse stallion
- Clabber Girl, a brand of baking powder, baking soda, and corn starch popular in the United States
- Clabbers, a variation of Scrabble
