= Wordfeud =

Scrabble-like multiplayer game

- Developer: Bertheussen IT
- Platforms: App Store; Google Play; Windows Phone
- Release: 2011
- Genre: Word game

Wordfeud is a multiplayer mobile word game developed by Håkon Bertheussen in 2010. In 2011, the game had nearly eight million users worldwide.

In 2021, it was reported that the game was being used by adult men for sexual abuse of teenage girls, first investigated by student reporters of Mid Sweden University.

== Reviews ==
Writing for PC World, Paul Jickling criticized the game's unoriginality, noting it as "exactly like Scrabble"; he further criticized the "annoying ads [...] integrated into app's design", noting how the full-screen ads appearing once per turn have to be dismissed by opening a menu, and referring to them as "tedious and unbearable".

== See also ==
- Scrabble variants
- Alfapet
