= Challenge (Scrabble) =

Occurrence in a game of Scrabble

In Scrabble, a challenge is the act of one player questioning the validity of one or more words formed by another player on the most recent turn. In double challenge (most common in North American tournaments), if one or more of the challenged words is not in the agreed-upon dictionary or word source, the challenged player loses their turn. If all challenged words are acceptable, the challenger loses their turn.

In tournament play, a player challenges by neutralizing the game clock and announcing, "Challenge." Both players must refer to word judge software, or request an adjudicator if one is unable to do so. Depending on the rules in play, there may be different consequences for a challenge. There are three common variations: double challenge, single challenge, and penalty challenge.

== Double challenge ==
Double challenge is most widely used in North American club and tournament play. Suppose a player makes a play and the opponent challenges. If the challenged word(s) are acceptable, the challenger loses their turn. If any of the challenged words is unacceptable, the player removes their played tiles and forfeits the turn.

In NASPA tournament play, the only exception occurs when the first play of the game misses the center star, in which the opponent may challenge the play off the board, regardless of its validity.

A criticism of double challenge is that it is more conducive to bluffing, although supporters of this rule believe it gives an added Poker-like element of strategy. A player may play a word they know is invalid in the hope that their opponent will not risk a challenge. Or a player could play a strange looking but legal word hoping their opponent will challenge it and lose their turn (and perhaps cause that player to be more reluctant to challenge words later).

== Single challenge ==
In single challenge, the challenger may challenge a play with no penalty. If the play is valid, it remains on the board. If it is invalid, it is removed from the board, and the challenged player scores zero for that turn. The challenger receives no penalty (point deduction or loss of a turn) no matter if the challenged play is valid or invalid.

A suggested flaw of this is that a player can challenge any word at any time, even words which are known to be valid; since tournament games are usually timed, this can be used to unfairly gain additional time to think about their own next turn.

== Penalty challenge ==
In penalty challenge (also known as modified single challenge, 5-point challenge, or 10-point challenge), a fixed number of points for the penalty is agreed on before the game, either by the two players or more often in tournament play, by the director(s). If a player challenges their opponent's play and it is invalid, the letters are taken back as usual and the opponent loses their turn. However, if the word is valid, the word remains on the board and the challenger loses 5, 10 or however many points the agreed penalty was. This can either be given to the opponent or subtracted from the challenger's score, depending on the agreed rules.

This is a compromise between single and double challenge, with many of the strengths and weaknesses of the two. Players are unlikely to challenge a word they know just to gain thinking time, as it may cost points or spread. On the other hand, the potential loss of points of a failed challenge may discourage a player from challenging a word they believe to be invalid, increasing the chances of an invalid word remaining throughout the game. 5-point challenge is most commonly used in international events, including the World Scrabble Championship.

== Holding a play ==
In club and tournament play, a player may choose to "hold" the previous play, provided that the opponent has not seen a single drawn tile yet, in order to consider whether to challenge. To do this, the player simply announces, "Hold," which prevents the opponent from drawing replenishment tiles for 15 seconds (but may draw thereafter, keeping those tiles separate). The player may decide to rescind the hold, or challenge the play.

== Internet variations ==
Scrabble and Scrabble-like game sites on the Internet such as Yahoo Games' Literati, Internet Scrabble Club and Lexulous offer automatic verification as an option, which makes it impossible to play an invalid word. The Facebook version of Scrabble and Zynga's mobile game Words With Friends make automatic verification compulsory without imposing a penalty for wrong guesses or a limit on the number of attempts, allowing players to guess repeatedly at words until the computer verifies one to be acceptable.

On the Internet Scrabble Club, where multiple languages are available, automatic validation allows players to play in their second language or even languages they have no experience with, without the fear of an invalid word ever being played.

Lexulous also has a "strict challenge" option in which a player loses a turn as well as 20 points on a wrong challenge.
