= Alfred Mosher Butts =

American architect who invented Scrabble (1899–1993)

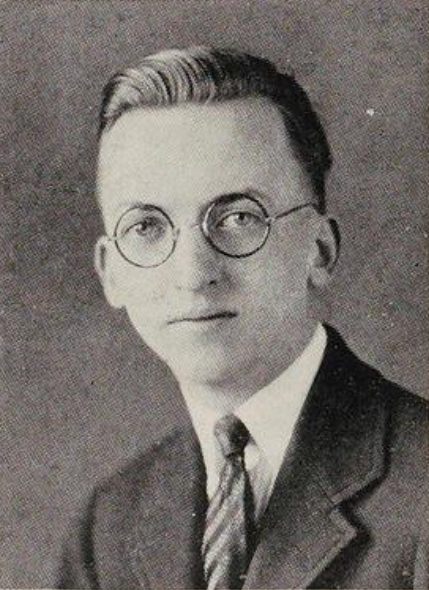
- Butts in 1924
- Born: April 13, 1899; Poughkeepsie, New York, U.S.
- Died: April 4, 1993 (aged 93); Rhinebeck, New York, U.S.
- Education: Poughkeepsie High School
- Alma mater: University of Pennsylvania
- Occupations: Architect, board game designer
- Known for: Inventing Scrabble
- Parents: Allison Butts (father); Arrie Elizabeth Mosher (mother)

Alfred Mosher Butts (April 13, 1899 – April 4, 1993) was an American architect, famous for inventing the board game Scrabble in 1931.

== Biography ==
Alfred Mosher Butts was born in Poughkeepsie, New York, on April 13, 1899, to Allison Butts and Arrie Elizabeth Mosher. His father was a lawyer, and his mother a high school teacher. Alfred attended Poughkeepsie High School and graduated in 1917. He then graduated from the University of Pennsylvania with a degree in architecture in 1924.

He was also an amateur artist, and six of his drawings were acquired by the Metropolitan Museum of Art.

Butts and his wife, Nina, who died circa 1979, were married for 54 years; they had no children. He died on April 4, 1993, nine days before his 94th birthday.

== Board games ==
=== Scrabble ===
In the early 1930s, after working as an architect but now unemployed, Butts set out to design a board game. He studied existing games and found that games fell into three categories: number games, such as dice and bingo; move games, such as chess and checkers; and word games, such as anagrams. Butts was a resident of Jackson Heights, New York, and the game of Scrabble was invented there. To memorialize his importance to the invention of the game, a street sign at 35th Avenue and 81st Street in Jackson Heights is stylized using letters with their values in Scrabble as a subscript.

Butts created a game that used both chance and skill by combining elements of anagrams and crossword puzzles, a popular pastime of the 1920s. Players draw seven lettered tiles from a pool and then attempt to form words from their letters. A key to the game was Butts's analysis of the English language. Butts studied the front page of The New York Times to calculate how frequently each letter of the alphabet is used. He then used each letter's frequency to determine how many tiles of each letter he would include in the game. He included only four "S" tiles so that the ability to pluralize words would not make the game too easy.

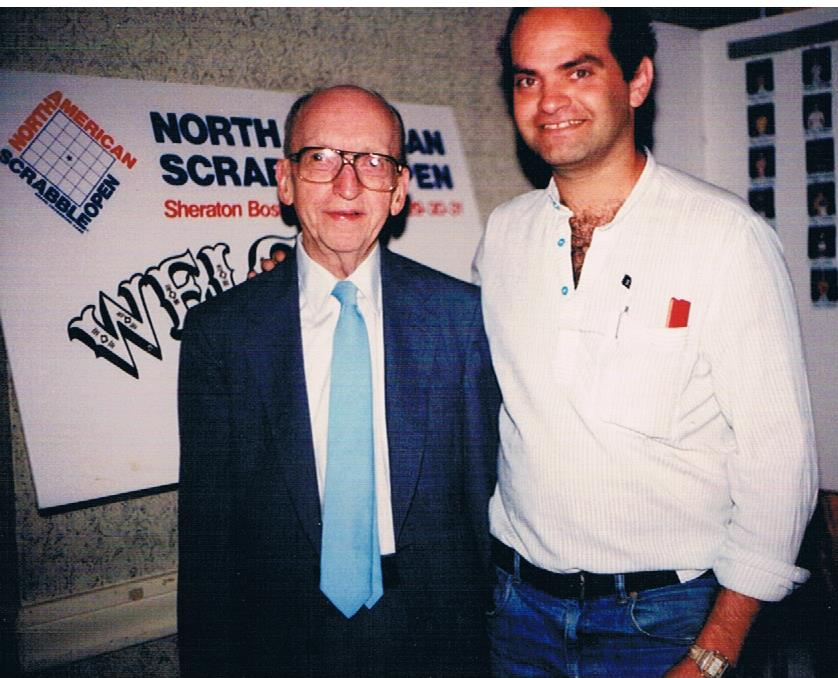
Butts (left) with Sam Orbaum in 1980

Butts initially called the game Lexiko, but changed the name to Criss Cross Words (he also considered It), and began to seek a buyer. The game makers he originally contacted rejected the idea, but Butts was tenacious. Eventually, he sold the rights to entrepreneur and game lover James Brunot, who made a few minor adjustments to the design and renamed the game Scrabble.

In 1948, the game was trademarked, and Brunot and his wife converted an abandoned schoolhouse in Dodgingtown, Connecticut, into a Scrabble factory. In 1949, the Brunots made 2,400 sets and lost $450 ($6,089 in 2025). But the game was steadily gaining popularity, helped by orders from Macy's department store. By 1952, the Brunots could no longer keep up with demand and asked licensed game maker Selchow and Righter to market and distribute the game. As of 2009, over 150 million sets had been sold worldwide, with between one and two million sets sold each year in North America alone.

=== Alfreds Other Game ===
In his 80s, Butts invented another game, titled simply Alfreds [sic] Other Game, released in 1985 by Selchow and Righter. Also a tile-based game, it has 144 letter tiles and four playing boards. Players receive 36 letters from which they try to make as many word combinations as possible. Butts called it "simultaneous solitaire". It has not had the commercial success of Scrabble. As of October 2023, the game has a rating of 5.5 out of 10 on the BoardGameGeek website.
