= Hervé Bohbot =

French Scrabble player

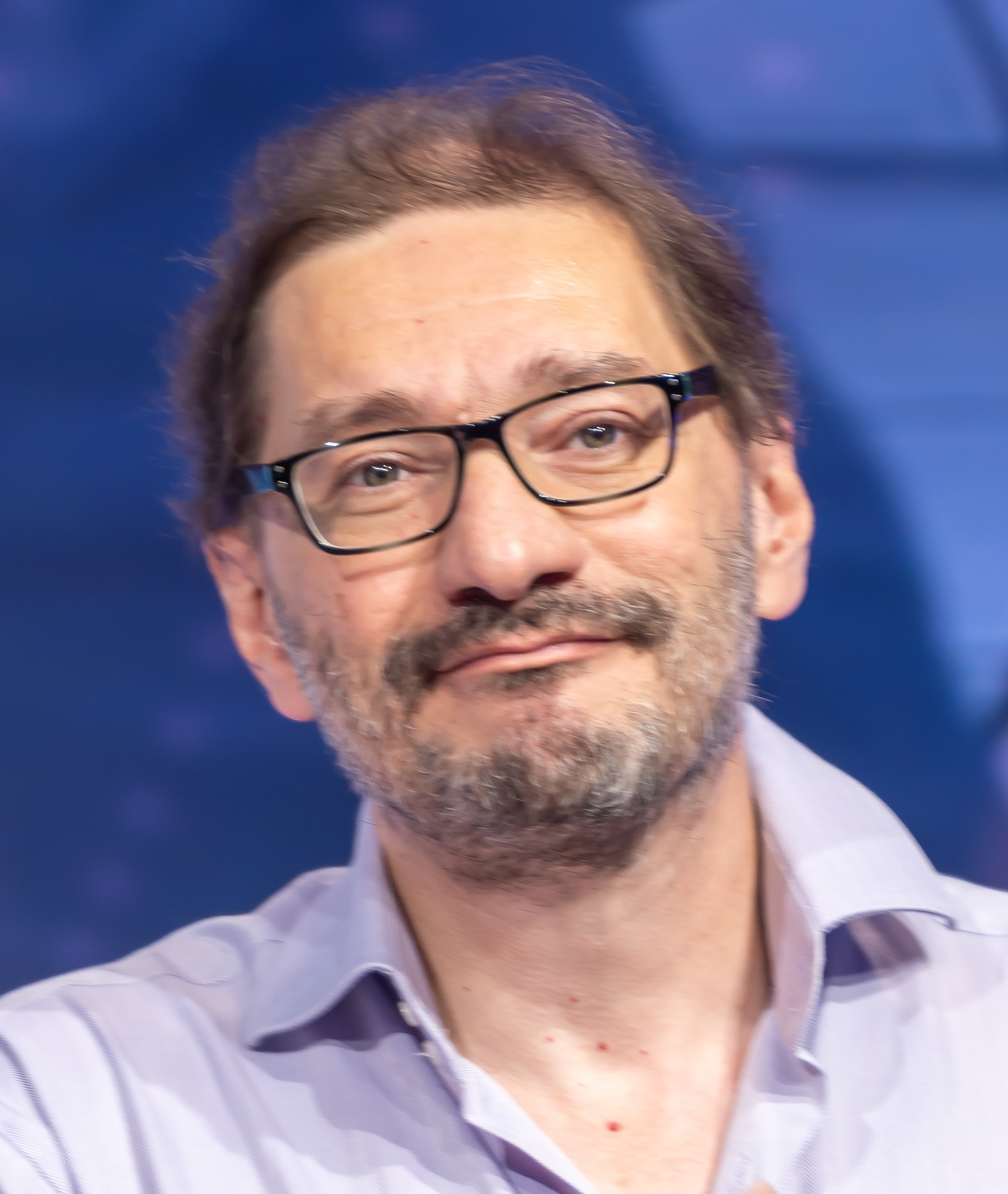
Hervé Bohbot

Herve Bohbot is a French Scrabble player who competes in both French and English language Scrabble competitions. He is also an administrator on the online Scrabble site Internet Scrabble Club, the president of the French matchplay Scrabble committee and an official on the French-speaking International Scrabble Federation.

== Biography ==
In French, Bohbot is ranked in première série - the top 1% of French Scrabble players. Bohbot finished second in the 2004 French matchplay championship, first in 2005, 2006 and 2011.

In English, he has represented France on six occasions at the World Scrabble Championship from 2003 to 2013. The highlight of these championships was almost certainly his victory against former World Champion Joel Wapnick in 2005.

== Notable Achievements ==
=== French matchplay championship ===
- winner (2005)
- second place (2004, 2006, 2007, 2011)

=== World Scrabble Championship ===
- 2003 87th/89 (8 wins, 16 losses)
- 2005 93rd/102 (9 wins, 15 losses)
- 2007 94th/104 (9 wins, 15 losses)
- 2009 85th/108 (10 wins, 14 losses)
- 2011 100th/106 (11 wins, 23 losses)
- 2013 99th/110 (14 wins, 17 losses)

== See also ==
- Internet Scrabble Club
- Francophone Scrabble
- World Scrabble Championship
