= Alfapet =

Swedish version of Scrabble

Alfapet was the original Swedish name for the popular word game Scrabble.

An edition from the 1990s. The motto Det Klassiska Korsordsspelet means "The classic crossword puzzle game".

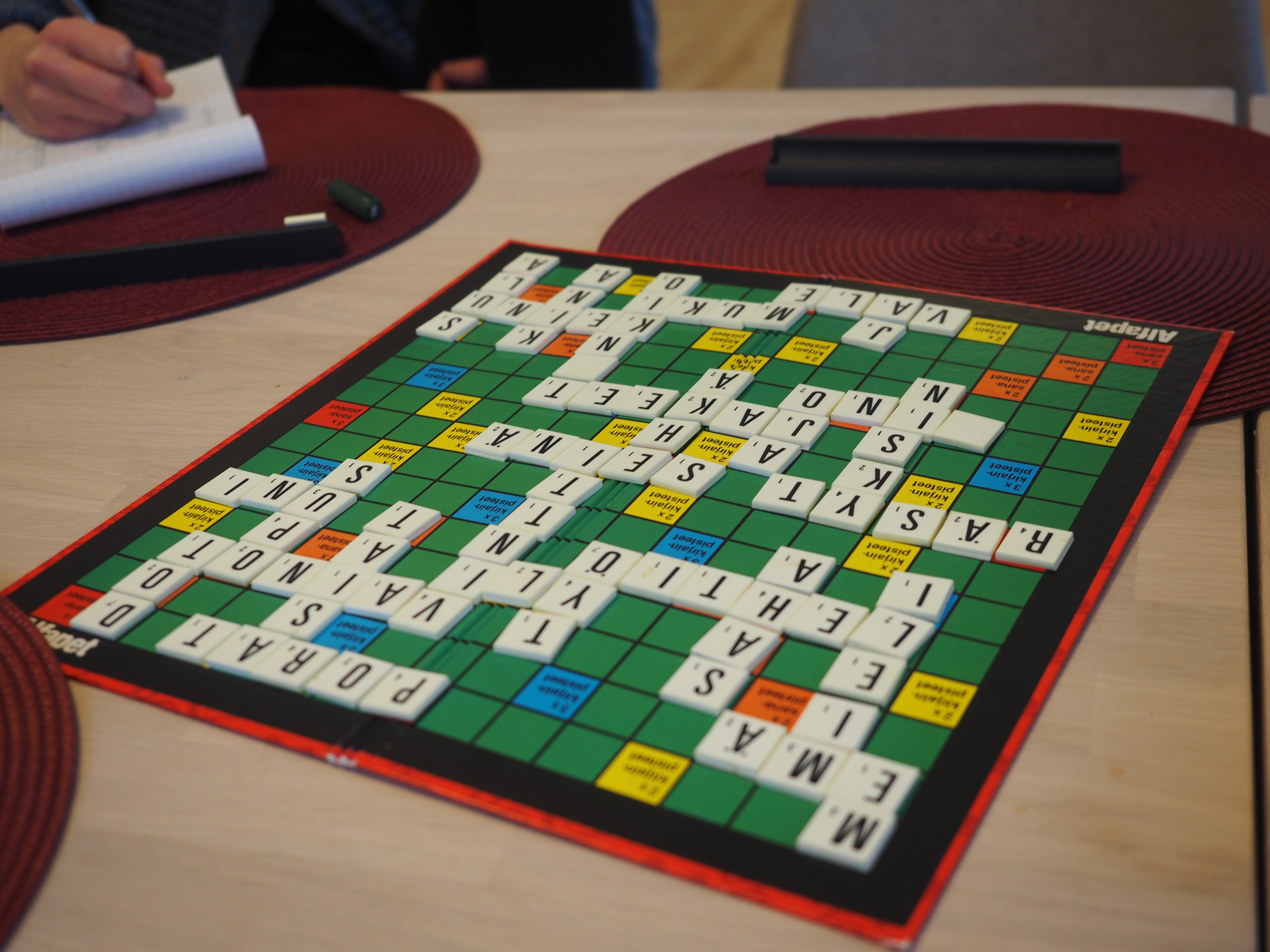
A game of Alfapet played in Loviisa, Finland

In 1954, the Swedish board game company Alga was granted a license by J. W. Spear & Sons to market Scrabble in Sweden. For almost four decades, Alga sold the game under the name Alfapet (wordplay on alfabet, the Swedish word for "alphabet"). In the 1980s, Alga was bought by BRIO, which retained Alga as its board games division.

In the early 1990s, Mattel acquired J. W. Spear & Sons and rescinded the BRIO/Alga license in order to market the game Scrabble themselves, in Sweden.

Still, BRIO/Alga retained the right to the name Alfapet, and quickly designed and marketed a similar word game using that name.

The new Alfapet word game makes sure to differ in several ways from the international game of Scrabble:

- The board has 17 x 17 squares (instead of 15 x 15).
- There are more bonus squares (even quadruples) and also reduction squares.
- There are 120 tiles (instead of 100) and the values differ from the Swedish Scrabble set.
- The letter Q has a separate tile (but can only be played with a blank tile in Scrabble).
- There are several rule differences.

== See also ==
- Scrabble
- Super Scrabble
