= Clabbers =

Variation of Scrabble

Clabbers is a game played by tournament Scrabble players for fun, or occasionally at Scrabble variant tournaments. The name derives from the fact that the words CLABBERS and SCRABBLE form an anagram pair.

== Rules ==
The rules are identical to those of Scrabble, except that valid plays are only required to form anagrams of acceptable words; in other words, the letters in a word do not need to be placed in the correct order. If a word is challenged, the player who played the word must then name an acceptable word that anagrams to the tiles played.

Because the number of "words" that can be formed is vastly larger than in standard English, the board usually ends up tightly packed in places, and necessarily quite empty in others. Game scores will often be much higher than in standard Scrabble, due to the relative ease of making high-scoring overlap plays and easier access to premium squares.

== Web version ==
The Internet Scrabble Club offers the ability to play Clabbers online.

== Example game (SOWPODS) ==
An example board from a game of SOWPODS Clabbers

Horizontal words from top to bottom (# denotes words that exist in the Collins English Dictionary but not the Tournament Word List). Some of the words below have multiple anagrams:

- ALI = AIL
- TOD = DOT
- ISNAETCR = CANISTER
- WOPL = PLOW
- DEER = DEER
- ZIF = FIZ
- SIATX = TAXIS
- BTADEI = BAITED
- MGU = GUM
- EMING = MINGE#
- ECOPU = COUPE
- RATHE = HEART
- IQ = QI
- VUEJ = JUVE#
- EWY = WYE
- ODOR = ODOR
- ASSGEOU = GASEOUS
- ROH = RHO

Vertical words from left to right

- ATIW = WAIT
- KAMER = MAKER
- LOSODF = FLOODS
- GCALINS = SCALING
- IDNPE = PINED
- UOT = OUT
- ALEZ = LAZE
- PHA = HAP
- RSITOUEN = ROUTINES
- FIAR = FAIR
- EBRYE = BEERY
- XIM = MIX
- NAV = VAN
- UO = OU#
- GULNED = LUNGED
- JOR = JOR#
- RO = OR
