= 1900s in games =

see also: 19th century in games, 1910s in games

This page lists board and card games published in the 1900s (decade).

== Games released or invented in the 1900s ==
- The Landlord's Game (an early version of Monopoly) (1904)
- Rook (1906)
- Touring (1906)
