= Wordscraper =

- Release: 2008

Wordscraper is a Scrabble-style word game formerly available as a Facebook application. It was created by the Agarwalla brothers Rajat and Jayant, creators of Scrabulous, and differs from Scrabble by having no fixed board design or tile distribution, instead prompting the user to choose their own.

Wordscraper was reportedly released in response to a DMCA action against Scrabulous by Hasbro. It has been online since January 2008.

== Gameplay ==
Wordscraper allows users to create a customised board and tile set of their choice. Users choose where premium squares are placed on the board. Premium squares range from 2x to 5x letter score and 2x to 5x word score. Users can also choose the tile distribution including quantity of each letter and score for each letter. Users are free to share the rules they have created with other players.

It is not possible to recreate the copyrighted Scrabble board layout using this process, or any rough approximation of the board - attempting to do so or to use a saved Scrabble-type layout results in a "Sorry, this board is not allowed" message or in the game being automatically changed to Wordscraper Standard. These restrictions were imposed as part of a legal settlement of a case brought by Hasbro concerning copyright of the Scrabble game.
