= Words of Gold =

2014 video game

- Words of Gold icon
- Developer: Cupcake Entertainment
- Platforms: Facebook, iOS, Android
- Release: Facebook: November 2014; Android: December 14, 2015 iOS: February 11, 2016
- Genre: Puzzle

Words of Gold is a multiplayer word game developed by Cupcake Entertainment. It was released in November 2014 for Facebook, December 2015 for Android, and February 2016 for iOS.

== Gameplay ==
Words of Gold is a word puzzle Scrabble game. Each level has an empty game board with a starting point for words which may contain obstacles. Random letters are placed at the bottom, and the user needs to drag them onto the board to form words. The player can create words horizontally or vertically.

The game comprises multiple levels, each with a distinct objective that players must accomplish within a limited number of moves or within a set time frame. These objectives may involve removing moss from the game board by matching tiles, achieving a certain score, bringing specific items to the bottom of the board, or clearing a predetermined number of words. To increase the difficulty of the levels, obstacles such as boxes, bombs, and multi-layered moss blocks are introduced. Failure to clear these obstacles within a certain number of moves may result in the level being lost. Players can earn or purchase boosters to aid them in their progress through the levels. Additional letters are placed in the pile by matching a combination of five letters. Blank letters show up randomly and can act as any letter. Letters marked with a small number in the left corner at the bottom of the tile give the player more points.

Illusion letters are purple tiles on which a new letter is displayed every round. Boosters include Hints (shows a word), Shuffle (reorders all words), Wand (changes letter to a blue or green colored letter), Hammer (clears a piece from the board), and Rainbow (all colored words explode). Extra Moves or Extra Time can also be acquired through in-app purchases.

The game is primarily monetized through in-app purchases (through Facebook credits).

Players begin with five "lives", which are lost whenever the player fails a level, a common feature in Cupcake's games. When they run out of lives, users can send requests to their Facebook friends for more lives, wait for them to replenish themselves (a life is restored every thirty minutes), and/or purchase them. At certain points of the game, primarily at the start of new "episodes", users must also either purchase or receive a request from at least three friends before they may access the next set of levels.

The game includes in-game advertisements to monetize users that choose to play for free.

Once all levels in an episode are completed, the next episode (starting at episode 2) is locked and the player must either get three friends on Facebook to send them "tickets" to unlock the next episode. It can also be unlocked directly through the in-game store. Other than waiting for the time period until mystery quests are available, using in-app purchases is the only way to unlock episodes. The game adds new levels and episodes in its updates. In July 2015 it reached 200 levels.

== Plot ==
The player solves puzzles to help the six colorful tamarins defeat the Evil Owls.

== Reception ==
Words of Gold has over 150 thousand players and around 5,000 active players every day. The game received particular mention in Brazilian media due to its popularity in the country.

== Sequel ==
In October 2013, a sequel titled Letters of Gold was soft-launched by Cupcake Entertainment. The game has a similar design but different gameplay mechanics, bringing its challenges to a word puzzle engine similar to Candy Crush Saga. As of September 2015, there are 440 Letters of Gold levels. Its mobile version is reportedly under development.
