= Lexiko =

Precursor of board game Scrabble

- Designers: Alfred Mosher Butts
- Illustrators: Alfred Mosher Butts
- Publication: 1931
- Years active: 1931–1938
- Genres: Word game
- Languages: English

Lexiko was a word game invented by Alfred Mosher Butts. It was a precursor of Scrabble. The name comes from the Greek lexicos, meaning "of or for words".

Lexiko was played with a set of 100 square cardboard tiles, with the same letter distribution later used by Scrabble (see Scrabble letter distributions), but no board. Players drew nine tiles at random, and attempted to construct words from them.

== History ==
In 1931, Butts wrote a paper entitled "Study of Games." In his paper, he described three categories of games: board, number games using playing cards or dice, and letter games (or games that fell into more than one). He noted that, although the most popular games were of the first two (e.g., chess and backgammon), the best letter game readily available was Anagrams. Around that time, he was reading "The Gold-Bug" by Edgar Allan Poe and noticed a line containing the English letter distribution. This gave him an epiphany: Anagrams would be more fun if the most common letters in English were more common in the game. He carefully analyzed letter frequencies in newspapers and other printed works to determine the ideal letter distribution for the game. With a few other changes, he named his project Lexiko. The game design was rejected by games manufacturers such as Parker Brothers and Milton Bradley, but Butts was able to sell copies on his own, though not enough to recoup his development expenses. In 1938, he began work on a board game based on Lexiko, which he called Criss-Cross Words, which was eventually renamed Scrabble.
