= Tile tracking =

Gaming strategy

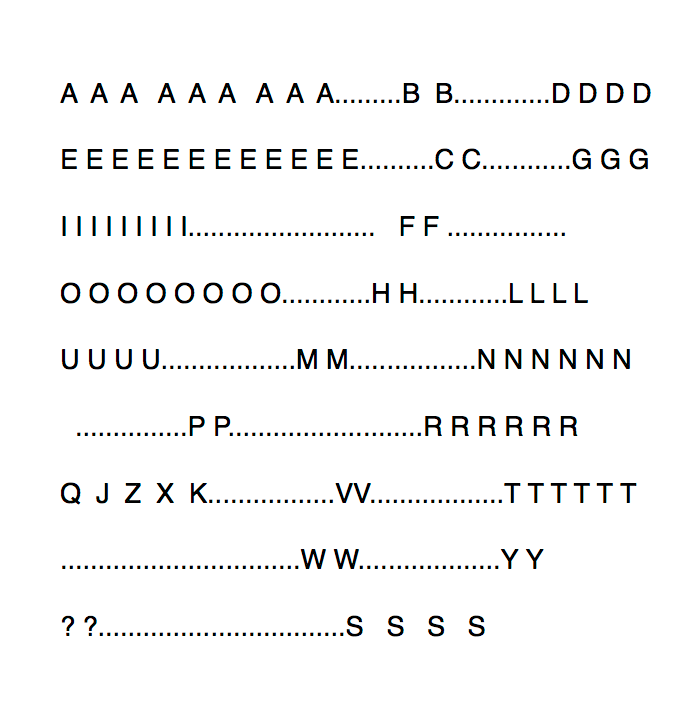
A typical tracking grid using the English-language Scrabble Letter distribution. The letters are organized to keep vowels and high-point/high value tiles (Q, J, Z, X, K, S and blanks) along the same 'sight-line' rather than in a strictly alphabetical format. There is no 'standard' way of arranging letters on a tracking grid, nor any rules that dictate one style over another.

Tile tracking is a technique most commonly associated with Scrabble and similar word games. It refers to the practice of keeping track of tiles played on the game board, typically by crossing them off a score sheet or tracking grid as they are played. Tracking tiles can be an important strategic aid, especially during the endgame, when there are no tiles left to draw and tracking allows each player to deduce the tiles on their opponent's rack. The marking off of each letter from a tracking grid as the tiles are played is a standard feature of tournament play.

Tracking sheets come in many varieties, and are often customized by players in an attempt to make the manual process of recording, tracking, and counting tiles easier, more intuitive, and less prone to error.

== Tile-tracking tools ==
Accurate tile-tracking depends upon knowing the total letter distribution and letter frequency of the game and then reproducing each tile in its correct frequency to facilitate the "accounting" as tiles are played. Pre-printed forms are popular for Scrabble because they eliminate the need to continuously create such a list for each new game.

While Scrabble-branded "tracker sheets" are available for purchase, customized tracking sheets of all types are freely available for downloading online, usually as PDFs to facilitate printing. Scrabble club websites are the most common source for pre-printed tracking sheets, and players often create their own tracking sheets.

== Technology ==
The introduction of Scrabble for computers saw the practical application of automated score-keeping, but the rapid technological advances computers and the internet brought about seemed only to serve the wider distribution of pre-printed tracking grids via downloads in terms of new tile-tracking tools.

Some websites offer online tile-tracking alternatives to paper and pencil. Users are required to manually input played tiles via the keyboard, and the input is then subtracted from a pool representing total tile distribution. The user then counts or otherwise calculates the remaining tiles. Notes are made on a separate piece of paper as necessary. The user is still tracking and counting tiles manually, and the risk of an inaccurate count due to human error remains roughly equal to the non-technological option.

The migration of Scrabble to mobile devices and the popularity of the digital exclusive Words with Friends has seen the introduction of a dedicated tile-tracking app exclusively for games played on mobile app devices that automates the process of tracking tiles and requires no manual input.

== Strategy ==
=== Advantages ===
The benefits of tracking and counting tiles are widely known among competitive Scrabble players and tile tracking is considered a standard part of tournament play. By tracking played tiles, players can learn what tiles remain unseen (either in the bag or on their opponent's rack) and use that information to make strategic decisions about what tiles to hold, which squares to block, and which tiles to play to create advantages.

Tile tracking provides much of the data required to make many of the strategic decisions a player makes in the course of a game, and has a key role in other strategic elements, including rack and board management. It is considered especially critical in the endgame (when there are no tiles left in the bag and seven or fewer tiles on each player's rack). At this point, "Scrabble is chess". If both players have tracked the tiles correctly, each knows what tiles the other has. Assuming a close game, the win will go to the player who can plan and calculate the best move while taking into account the other player's possible responses—winning a close game by blocking an opponent's play or setting up a play the opponent cannot block.

Five-time winner of the Australian Championship John Holgate notes that tile-tracking is particularly important in tight "bobbing" finishes when the bag is empty, and that many games are lost through "just not knowing what tiles your opponent has on her rack. You simply cannot calculate possible permutations if you are unsure about which letters are relevant."

Tracking can also tell a player if the bag is "vowel-heavy" or "consonant-heavy", how many S's or blanks are unseen, whether their opponent is likely to have a bingo on their rack, and which tiles to play or conserve. For example, if Alice has the option of playing J(I)NN or J(I)LL, and four N's and zero L's remain unseen, then assuming both plays are otherwise equal (in terms of score, openings for the opponent, etc.), J(I)NN is likely the better play.

Letter frequency lists for both Scrabble and Words with Friends are easily accessible (some versions of Scrabble have the tile distribution directly on the board) and, unlike word lists, using them is not against tournament rules.

Whether done mentally, using a paper and pencil to track tiles, accessing a website program or a tile-counting app on mobile devices, every player has the same level of access to the same amount of readily available data——and even those unfamiliar with tile tracking as a studied technique are "tracking tiles" if they note that the Q is still unseen or count the number of S's on the board before playing a word that can take an S hook to the opponent's advantage.

=== Disadvantages ===
Manual tile tracking can take away game time that would otherwise be used for finding words and making decisions about where to play them. Inaccurate tile tracking can lead to mistakes, such as setting up a spot for one's S when the opponent also has an S, or failing to block a winning play by the opponent. Holgate recalls winning a game in the 1993 World Championship because his opponent inadvertently crossed off two S's with one stroke and failed to block the last S hook.

The traditional method of manually tracking and counting tiles is generally considered tedious and time-consuming, so some players track tiles in a simplified manner, usually by mentally tracking and counting the letters considered key: the Q, J, Z, X, and the esses and the blanks. It can take several months to a year for players to track all 100 tiles consistently without affecting their game play.

== Outside the Scrabble community ==
In some discussions and reader comments related to Words with Friends, the idea that an opponent can "know what's on your rack" or what tiles remain unseen has been called "outside help" or "borderline cheating". Tile-tracking is considered an acceptable part of Scrabble and sanctioned by NSA and NASPA rules, but there is much colloquial evidence to suggest that tile-tracking as both a legitimate technique and a strategic tool is not widely known outside the Scrabble community. The technique's similarity to card counting contributes to some of the confusion among novice players.

Zynga's Words with Friends online game includes tile-tracking as a paid feature called Peeks. This was criticized as a form of cheating that Zynga condones and profits from. Zynga's strategy has been called a threat to the integrity of the game, because of what it might cause "loyal Scrabblers" to think about Words with Friends players: "I seriously doubt that loyal Scrabblers are going to be happy when they find out that the reason their friend has been winning lately is because he paid an extra $10 to have an advantage".

== Examples ==
The value of tile tracking is apparent once a player understands that Scrabble is as much about probability as it is about vocabulary. Once possible plays have been discovered, the strategic decisions to be made have been called as "dark and complex as a forest".

- Near the end of a game, the eight tiles unseen by Alice are EFINRSSJ (seven on the opponent's rack and one in the bag). Alice can deduce that her opponent must have at least one S.
- Near the end of the game, the only way Bob can win is to draw an S or a V, and the 10 unseen tiles are AACEIINRSV.
  - If Bob plays one tile, the probability he will draw the S or V is $\frac{2}{10} = 20\%$, assuming each unseen tile is equally likely to be in the bag.
  - If Bob plays two tiles, the probability he will draw the S or V is $1 - \frac{\binom{8}{2}}{\binom{10}{2}} \approx 37.8 \%$.
  - If Bob plays three or more tiles, the probability he will draw the S or V is $1 - \frac{\binom{8}{3}}{\binom{10}{3}} \approx 53.3 \%$.
