= Internet Scrabble Club =

Website that facilitates online Scrabble play

The Internet Scrabble Club (ISC) is a website that allows players around the world to play Scrabble through a web interface. Previously, one had to download software, called Wordbiz, to play, but Wordbiz is no longer supported.

== Using ISC ==
Players start games either by sending or accepting a "seek," or sending or accepting a match request. A seek is a request for a game with certain parameters, including the lexicon, the time limit (between 1 and 60 whole minutes), the type of challenge (SINGLE, DOUBLE, 5-POINTS, or VOID), and the minimum and maximum ratings criteria that the other player must meet.

== Organisation and management ==
The ISC was created and is run by the player known as Carol (real name Florin Gheorghe), who lives in Romania, hence the URL www.isc.ro. The other administrator is Herve, who is the 2005 French matchplay national champion, Hervé Bohbot.

The administrators invite certain players to be moderators, also known as helpers. There is a command, 'ASK', whereby players may ask questions of the helpers; if a helper answers a question, the question and the answer will appear on channel 0. Some helpers are given the power to restrict the activities of players who have violated the rules of the site, e.g. by using inappropriate language. The primary function of the moderators, who are only intermittently present, is to answer questions about the site and to moderate the language and content of the discussions in order to make the site pleasant for most players.

The players are split into two categories—members and contributory members. The ISC is a free service; no member needs to pay to use the site's facilities. But there are benefits for contributory or support players, who pay an annual fee. These benefits include the right to play against computer players, to save games in a library, to use an examiner program that suggests solutions for game positions, and many others. A full list of benefits can be found at the ISC website linked below.

== Bots ==
There are about 35 robots that are playable on ISC. On the server, which is hosted in the US, the list of bots is accessed using "who C". Contributory members have priority over non-contributory members when requesting to play against these robots. The bots have different skill levels. Bamse, Adela, and Myrrhs are novices; Keres, Automat, and Dogberry are intermediates; Waxberry, Alehin, and Woland are experts. It is advised that the initial time be set relatively high, because the bots take no time to make their moves. On the ISC seek graph, bots are denoted by a square instead of a dot. The bots also have C next to their names. Finally, players who intend to use an anagram program on ISC must inform Carol or Herve, the administrators, so "C labels" can be assigned to them.

== Other languages on the ISC ==
The ISC does its best to use official word lists—those used in club and tournament competition in various countries. It uses two English-language word sets: NWL2023, which is used in the U.S., Canada, Thailand and Israel, and SOWPODS, which is used for the rest of the world. But the ISC caters to multiple languages. It uses ODS 5 for French, LOC v.4 for Romanian, ZINGA for Italian and SWL for Dutch. There is also the "Multi" dictionary, which consists of English, French, and Romanian words, and has proved popular for online tournaments.

There is also the option of playing Clabbers. It is not official on the ISC, but it is available.

== Some champions on the ISC ==
The help file ISC.ro has a fairly extensive list of these.
