= Harriet T. Righter =

American businesswoman (1878–1982)

- Born: February 24, 1878; Brooklyn, New York, US
- Died: June 8, 1982 (aged 104); Brooklyn, New York, US
- Occupation: Businesswoman
- Known for: President, Selchow and Righter (1923–1954)

Harriet T. Righter (February 24, 1878 – June 8, 1982) was an American businesswoman, the president of Selchow and Righter, a game company, which was co-founded by her father. Her best-known addition to the company's properties was Scrabble, which she thought was "a nice little game".

== Early life ==
Harriet T. Righter was born in Brooklyn, the daughter of John H. Righter, who co-founded the game company Selchow and Righter with Elias Selchow in 1870. She had sisters, Katherine and Jessie, and a brother who died young. She attended Wellesley College.

== Career ==
Righter did settlement work in New York as a young woman, and was the first president of United Neighborhood Houses of New York in 1921. She was active in the City Fusion Party in Brooklyn in the 1930s, and worked on the mayoral campaign of Fiorello LaGuardia in 1933. In 1936, Mayor LaGuardia named Righter to the board of trustees of the Brooklyn Public Library. She was also chair of the library's Friends of the Library organization.

Righter became president of Selchow and Righter in 1923. Under her leadership, the company began manufacturing (not just selling) games, expanding advertising and promotion of the games, and offering popular games in different editions, to appeal to a wider range of buyers. Her best-known addition to the company's properties was Scrabble, when Selchow and Righter licensed the game from entrepreneur James Brunot in 1952. "It's a nice little game. It will sell well in bookstores", she remembered saying about Scrabble when she first saw it. In its second year as a Selchow and Righter-built product, nearly four million sets were sold. She retired from the executive role at Selchow and Righter in 1954, but stayed active in the company as an adviser and public face.

== Personal life ==
Righter died in 1982, aged 104 years, at her home in Brooklyn.
