= 18th century in games =

see also: 17th century in games, 19th century in games

== Significant games-related events in the 18th century ==
- 1742 – Edmond Hoyle publishes his A Short Treatise on the Game of Whist.
- 1750 – The compendium Mr. Hoyle's Games Complete is released, considered the first 'Hoyle' book published.
