= Letters of Gold =

2013 video game

- Letters of Gold icon
- Developer: Cupcake Entertainment
- Platforms: Facebook (Adobe Flash), iOS, Android
- Release: Facebook: October, 2013
- Genre: Puzzle

Letters of Gold is a word puzzle game released by Brazilian studio Cupcake Entertainment in October 2013 for Facebook. In March 2015, the game reached 400 levels. The game is periodically updated, adding new "episodes" and levels.

Android and iPhone versions of the game are currently under development.

== Gameplay ==
=== General ===
This game is a variation of word puzzle puzzle video game games such as Bejeweled. Each level has a game board filled with differently places letters, and might contain obstacles. The player can select letters horizontally, vertically and diagonally in order to create words.

Each level contains a certain objective that must be completed in a given number of moves (or on a time limit); some levels require clearing "moss" off the board by making matches on top of them, reaching a certain score, getting top hat items to the bottom of the board, or having to clear certain numbers of letters.

Levels may also contain blocks to make them more difficult, such as boxes or bombs (which end the level if they are not matched before they go off), multi-layered moss blocks, and others. Boosters can be earned or purchased to provide assistance during levels.

=== Letters ===
Different "special letters" can be formed by matching a combination of 4 (blue) or 5 (green) letters. The blue letter explodes as a cross, clearing 4 letters around the colored letter. The green letter explodes all of its surrounding 8 letters. These can also be created using in-game boosters.

Some letters might have a special value, that will give the user more points are marked with a small number in the down-left corner of the tile. User might also get “Illusion” letters. These are purple tiles that change the letter they are after each new round.

The player can also use various Boosters before or into the level to attempt to win levels more easily or extend play after a lost level; Hint shows a word, Shuffle reorder all of the letters in the board, Wand turns a letter indo colored letter (blu or green), Hammer clears a single piece from the board, Rainbow explodes all of the colored letters on the board. Extra Moves or Extra Time can be purchased if running out at the end of a game.

=== In-app purchases ===
The game is primarily monetized through in-app purchases (through Facebook credits). Players begin with five "lives", lost whenever a level is failed. This applies to all of Cupcake's games. When they are exhausted, users can either send requests to their Facebook friends for more lives, wait for them to replenish themselves (a life is restored every half-hour), or purchase them. At certain points, primarily at the start of new "episodes", users must also either purchase, or receive a request from at least three friends before they may access the next set of levels. Boosters, to make the levels easier, can also be bought using in-app purchases. The game also includes in-game advertisements to monetize on users that don't spend money into the game.

While the game includes freemium content, just like Candy Crush, 97.7% of people playing the game are playing for free, while only 2.3% pay.

=== Passing episodes ===
Once all levels in an episode are completed, the next episode (starting at episode 2) is locked and the player must either get three friends on Facebook to send them "tickets" to unlock the next episode, it can also be unlocked directly through the in-game store. Other than waiting the time period until mystery quests are available, using in app purchase is the only way to unlock episodes.

== Characters ==
Throughout the game, the player solves puzzles so that the 6 colorful Tamarins can beat the Evil Owls. Characters also include tutorial guide Mr. Caco.

== Reception ==
Letters of Gold has over 300 thousand players and around 10 thousand active players every day. The game received particular mention in Brazil media, due to its popularity in the country. Cupcake Entertainment, developer of the game, is a Brazilian company.

== Legacy ==
In November 2014, a sequel titled Words of Gold was soft launched by Cupcake Entertainment, with a similar design but new gameplay dynamics, bringing its challenges to a Scrabble engine similar to Words With Friends. As of September 2015, there are 260 Words of Gold levels. Its mobile version is reportedly under development.
