= The Game of Alice in Wonderland =

First card game based on Alice in Wonderland

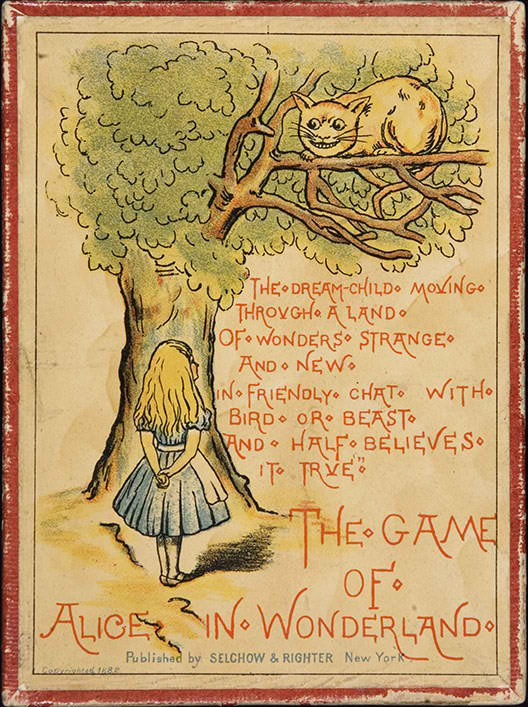
- Original box cover, 1882
- Players: 2–6
- Setup time: 1 minute
- Playing time: 20 to 30 minutes
- Age range: 8 and up

The Game of Alice in Wonderland, subtitled "The dream-child moving through a land of wonders strange and new in a friendly chat with bird or beast and half believes it true," is a card game published in 1882 by Selchow and Righter. It was the first card game to be published that was based on Alice in Wonderland by Lewis Carroll.

== Description ==
The Game of Alice in Wonderland uses a custom deck of 52 cards divided into three "suits": starred picture cards, plain picture cards, and numbered cards.

- Star picture cards: 16 cards are numbered from 1 to 16; each card has a star and a picture based on John Tenniel's original illustrations in Alice in Wonderland. The top-ranked picture card is Alice, and the lowest-ranked picture card is the dodo.
- Plain picture cards: Another 16 cards are identical to the first set but have no star.
- 20 unillustrated cards are numbered from 1 to 20.

=== Card ranking ===
The cards are ranked by suit and by number (16 being the highest rank):

- Star picture cards are the highest-ranked suit, and trump all plain picture cards and numbered cards.
- Plain picture cards trump all numbered cards.

=== Setup ===
The cards are shuffled, and each player is dealt seven cards. When cards run out, another seven cards are dealt, and this continues until all cards in the deck have been played.

=== Gameplay ===
The first player leads any card, starred, plain or numbered. If the second player has its mate (a card of the same number, whether starred, plain or numbered), the mate must be played, and the higher-ranked cards defeat its mate. If the second player does not have its mate, the second player must follow with a card of the same suit if possible. Other players play according to the same rules. If two or more picture cards are in play and a player has the mates to both, the player must play the mate of the first picture card played.

=== Victory points ===
When the deck is exhausted and all cards have been played, players add up their victory points by examining the cards they have taken:

- For each pair: 10 points
- Holding both Alice and the Pool of Tears: 20 points
- Holding the largest number of cards: 10 points

The player with the most points is the winner

== Publication history ==
The children's book Alice's Adventures in Wonderland by Lewis Carroll was first published in both the UK and the US in 1865. Seventeen years later, in 1882, the American games company Selchow and Righter published what The Lewis Carroll Society of North America recognizes as the first game based on the book, The Game of Alice in Wonderland.

== Recognition ==
Copies of the game are held in the special collections of:

- Kent State University (accession number kent.b2383191)
- The Lilly Library of Indiana University
