= Lexulous =

Online word game

- Website type: Casual game
- Available in: English
- Founded: Kolkata, India (5 July 2006)
- Headquarters: Kolkata, India
- Key people: Rajat Agarwalla, Co-founder; Jayant Agarwalla, Co-founder
- Services: Online word game
- Revenue: $3,000 per year
- Employees: 2 (January 2008)
- Website: www.lexulous.com
- Registration: Required
- Launched: 2005
- Current status: Active

Lexulous (formerly Scrabulous) is an online word game based on the commercial board game Scrabble. It is run by an Indian company of the same name on a dedicated website, and is also available within the social networking site Facebook.

The Scrabulous website was launched in 2005, and the game was added to Facebook as an application in 2007, quickly becoming the most popular game on Facebook. Due to copyright infringement lawsuits, the game was removed from Facebook in 2008, first for North American users and later worldwide, with the Scrabulous website following suit.

A ruling by Delhi High Court allowed Calcutta-based Rajat and Jayant Agarwalla to retain the right to post their word game online, but they were not allowed to use Scrabulous, Scrabble or any other “similar sounding” name. Thus on 27 September 2008, a new website was launched using the new moniker "Lexulous". It has a live version and practice mode, and an option for play by email.

On 20 December 2008, Hasbro withdrew their lawsuit against RJ Softwares. On 1 January 2009, Lexulous was activated on Facebook. As of 23 March 2009, the application had about 585,000 monthly active users. Electronic Arts' version had about 586,000 while RealNetworks' version had 357,000 users.

== History ==
The Scrabulous company was founded by Rajat and Jayant Agarwalla, both commerce graduates of St. Xavier's College, Kolkata, India. The Scrabulous website was created at the end of 2005, after the Agarwalla brothers, Rajat and Jayant, who had won numerous Scrabble tournaments, felt the need for a free gaming site where the popular game could be played. It was initially made available as "BingoBinge", with the site moving to Scrabulous on 5 July 2006.

In 2006 the website had 20,000 registered users, but after the developers made an application for the popular social networking website Facebook it had been added to 840,000 user pages, with more than 500,000 users daily, giving it "the most active users of any game that can be played over Facebook".

=== Legal and copyright issues ===
A game in progress on Facebook

Scrabulous faced legal issues due to its resemblance to Scrabble along with a similar name. It also copied the board layout, rules, and at one stage the number of tiles. These issues forced the removal of the game from Facebook in mid-2008 and its eventual rebranding. The rights to Scrabble are currently owned within the US and Canada by Hasbro, and throughout the rest of the world by Mattel.

According to Anthony Falzone — head of the Fair Use Project at Stanford University — copyright laws do not allow someone to freely copy the particular expression of an idea. In his article in the Wall Street Journal, Jamin Brophy-Warren has said that Hasbro Inc. has refused to comment on legal matters, while the creators have mentioned informing the company about their site. The former Scrabulous website made several references to Scrabble, and previously provided a link to the rules of Scrabble and promoted itself as the best place to play Scrabble online.

It was reported that Hasbro made an attempt to acquire Scrabulous in January 2008 for an undisclosed sum in the range of $10 million. The game had been generating advertising revenue of over $25,000 a month for the Agarwalla brothers, however they refused to sell their application to Hasbro, instead requesting a "multiple" of $10 million. It was reported that the Agarwallas had also been looking for other potential suitors who would be willing to pay higher premiums.

=== Fan protest ===
As of October 2007, the term Scrabulous was registered as a trademark and service mark with the United States Patent and Trademark Office, but in February 2008 it was officially abandoned by the applicant. Hasbro threatened to shut Scrabulous down via legal means in January 2008. Facebook was also asked to pull Scrabulous from its site's application database, but initially demurred.

In reaction to the news that the Facebook application was in legal jeopardy, two groups made a "SCRABULOUS" music video spoof of the Fergie song "Glamorous." The video from web entertainment group TastesLikeTV.com professes "L, T, S, and R / Ain't gonna get you very far," while the YouTube video created by Team Awesome Productions says that Scrabulous is the "swappy, swappy." Both viral web videos were mentioned in the February 22, 2008 issue of Entertainment Weekly.

Mattel launched its official version of online Scrabble, Scrabble by Mattel, on Facebook in late March 2008. As Hasbro controls the rights to Scrabble for North America with Mattel holding them for the rest of the world, the Facebook application is available only to players outside the United States and Canada. Scrabulous users reacted by creating a group called Save Scrabulous, asking Facebook to shut down the game on its site. Reportedly more than 54,000 fans have joined this group. It had also been reported that Scrabulous fans had written to Hasbro and Mattel demanding that the companies make "the right decision", and threatened to stop buying Mattel and Hasbro products if they shut down Scrabulous.

=== Lawsuit ===
On 24 July 2008, Hasbro formally sued Rajat and Jayant Agarwalla, along with their company, RJ Softwares. The suit claimed Scrabulous violated the Digital Millennium Copyright Act and infringed upon Hasbro's intellectual property rights. On 29 July 2008, Scrabulous was shut down on Facebook for users in North America, with the error message, "Scrabulous is disabled for US and Canadian users until further notice." Less than a month later, the game was also pulled in all other countries but India.

On 26 September 2008, the Scrabulous web site was suspended. This followed a ruling by the Delhi High Court that although the game Scrabble itself could not be copyrighted, and the Agarwalla brothers could therefore continue to offer their similar game online, they were however not permitted to use the name Scrabulous or any other name similar to that of Scrabble.

=== Launch of Lexulous ===
The day after the Delhi High Court ruling, the game was once more made available online under the new name "Lexulous". Whilst the game had an appearance overhaul, it still maintained the essential elements of the Scrabulous version including all of its records, user IDs, and saved information.

Lexulous also altered the layout of the game to differentiate it more from Scrabble. This change occurred on 3 December 2008, and saw score multipliers moved around the board, and the point score of tiles no longer matching those of Scrabble. In addition a player is now given 8 tiles to play with instead of the traditional 7 tiles. A 4x multiplier had been added to the game, however this feature was removed the next day.

As of early 2011, one of the original Lexulous features, ordinary seven-letter Scrabble (including solitaire and versus the robot) became available again on the Lexulous website for users outside of USA and Canada.

== Wordscraper ==
Wordscraper is a Scrabble-based word game application available on Facebook, also created by the Agarwalla brothers, which received an influx of people from the closure of Scrabulous in North America. It was reported inaccurately that Wordscraper was released after Scrabulous was shut down; however the application has been available since January 2008.

== Media and popularity ==
As one of the first applications launched on Facebook, Scrabulous enjoyed relatively large popularity. It was featured in PC World's 100 best products of 2008.

== See also ==
- Scrabble
- Wordscraper
