= Super Scrabble =

Board game based on Scrabble

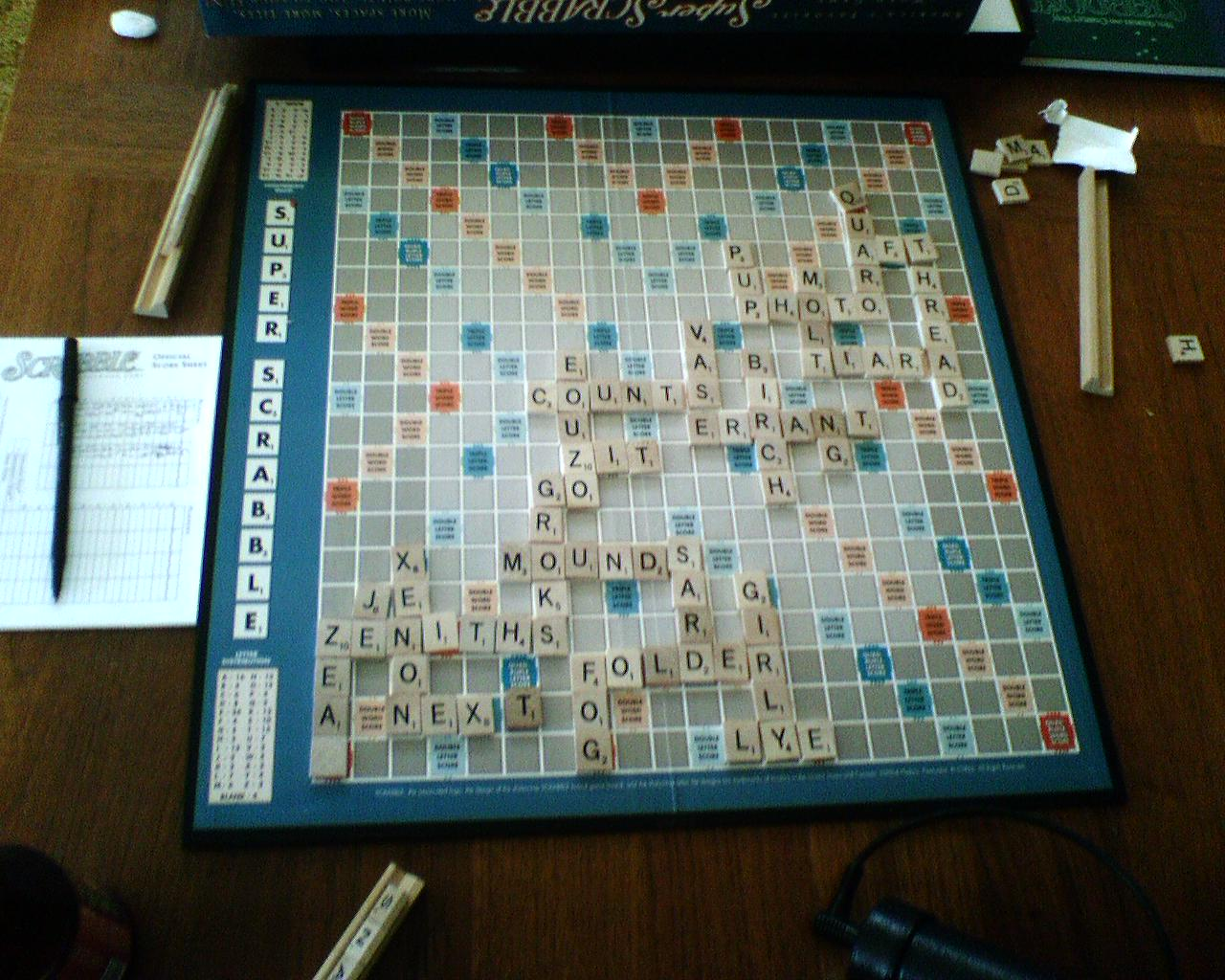
A Super Scrabble game

Super Scrabble is a board game introduced in 2004 and a variant of Scrabble. It is played on a 21×21 grid board instead of Scrabble's usual 15×15, and uses twice as many letter tiles.

In North America Super Scrabble is made and marketed by Winning Moves Games, but licensed by Hasbro. In the rest of the world it is manufactured by Tinderbox Games under license from Mattel. Super Scrabble is available in English and German. In February 2007, a Deluxe Super Scrabble was released with a rotating gameboard and interlocking tiles, just like Deluxe Scrabble.

== Gameplay differences ==
The changes from standard Scrabble in Super Scrabble are summarized by the latter's tagline, "More spaces, more tiles, more points—add to your fun!" The board is larger (21×21 or 441 squares vs. 15×15 or 225 squares); there are more premium squares (going up to quadruple letter and word score spaces); there are 200 tiles, twice as many as a normal Scrabble set. The middle 15×15 squares are identical to a Scrabble board, so standard Scrabble may be played on a Super Scrabble board. All the high-scoring quadruple premiums lie near the outside of the board, with the quadruple word squares at the four corners of the board.

Other than the differences in the board and the number of tiles, gameplay is similar to Scrabble. Each player has seven tiles in their rack as normal, scoring is the same, and the same word lists are used. However, the differences are enough to upset normal Scrabble strategies. For example, earning fifty points in a bingo bonus (using all seven tiles) is not nearly as significant when compared to the high final scores. For a two-player game, scores over eight hundred points are not uncommon.

Tournament-level Scrabble games are usually limited to two players. Many tournament players find games with more players cramped. With its larger board, Super Scrabble is ideally suited for three- and four-player games. Indeed, its scoring sheets do not have enough lines to keep score for most two-player games.

Super Scrabble has exactly twice as many tiles as Scrabble, but the distribution of letters is not simply the original distribution doubled. The distribution is:

- 4 blank tiles (scoring 0 points)
- 1 point: E ×24, A ×16▼, O ×15▼, T ×15▲, I ×13▼, N ×13▲, R ×13▲, S ×10▲, L ×7▼, U ×7▼
- 2 points: D ×8, G ×5▼
- 3 points: C ×6▲, M ×6▲, B ×4, P ×4
- 4 points: H ×5▲, F ×4, W ×4, Y ×4, V ×3▼
- 5 points: K ×2
- 8 points: J ×2, X ×2
- 10 points: Q ×2, Z ×2

The ▲ and ▼ indicate modifications from double the original distribution, with ▲ indicating more than double the original distribution, and ▼ indicating fewer. Note, for example, that there are more than twice as many S's (ten, whereas standard Scrabble has four). This was done to make more opportunities for plurals and third-person singular verbs.

Due to the board and letter distribution alterations, the highest theoretical score from one word is 11520, scored from the word BENZALPHENYLHYDRAZONE (using the two Z tiles and a x144 multiplier from the TWSs and QWSs). How the word on the board can be constructed is currently unknown.

A	B	C	D	E	F	G	H	I	J	K	L	M	N	O	P	Q	R	S	T	U
1	4× WS	2× LS	3× WS	2× LS	3× WS	2× LS	4× WS	1
2	2× WS	3× LS	2× WS	2× WS	3× LS	2× WS	2
3	2× WS	4× LS	2× WS	2× WS	4× LS	2× WS	3
4	2× LS	3× WS	2× LS	3× WS	2× LS	3× WS	2× LS	4
5	3× LS	2× WS	3× LS	3× LS	2× WS	3× LS	5
6	4× LS	2× WS	2× LS	2× LS	2× WS	4× LS	6
7	2× LS	2× WS	2× LS	2× WS	2× LS	7
8	3× WS	2× WS	2× WS	3× WS	8
9	2× WS	3× LS	3× LS	3× LS	3× LS	2× WS	9
10	2× WS	2× LS	2× LS	2× LS	2× LS	2× WS	10
11	2× LS	3× WS	2× LS	2× LS	3× WS	2× LS	11
12	2× WS	2× LS	2× LS	2× LS	2× LS	2× WS	12
13	2× WS	3× LS	3× LS	3× LS	3× LS	2× WS	13
14	3× WS	2× WS	2× WS	3× WS	14
15	2× LS	2× WS	2× LS	2× WS	2× LS	15
16	4× LS	2× WS	2× LS	2× LS	2× WS	4× LS	16
17	3× LS	2× WS	3× LS	3× LS	2× WS	3× LS	17
18	2× LS	3× WS	2× LS	3× WS	2× LS	3× WS	2× LS	18
19	2× WS	4× LS	2× WS	2× WS	4× LS	2× WS	19
20	2× WS	3× LS	2× WS	2× WS	3× LS	2× WS	20
21	4× WS	2× LS	3× WS	2× LS	3× WS	2× LS	4× WS	21
A	B	C	D	E	F	G	H	I	J	K	L	M	N	O	P	Q	R	S	T	U
Quadruple word score Triple word score Double word score	Quadruple letter score Triple letter score Double letter score
The board design used in Super Scrabble.
