= Tapple =

2012 party game

- Publishers: The Op Games
- Publication: 2012; 14 years ago
- Genres: Card game; Party game
- Players: 2–8
- Playing time: 30 minutes
- Age range: 8+

Tapple is a party game for 2–8 players published by The Op Games in 2012. Players think up words related to a topic and tap their first letters on an electronic device before a ten-second timer runs out.

== Publishing history ==
Tapple was developed by the toy development agency NPD Toys and was first released in 2012 by the publisher The Op Games (formerly USAopoly). It was based on the German game Pim Pam Pet.

Tapple 10 was released in 2016, adding more category cards and providing instructions for 10 ways to play Tapple with varying numbers of players and difficulties. In early 2024, Tapple went viral on TikTok, featuring in videos with more than 20 million views. In late 2024, The Op Games released Tapple: After Dark, an adult version of Tapple with more mature category cards.

== Gameplay ==
Tapple is played using a Tapple wheel, a special electronic device with levers featuring most of the letters of the alphabet in a ring around a central timer button. The game is played over multiple rounds, during which players take multiple turns. At the start of each round, a category card is chosen and the timer is started, giving the first player 10 seconds to complete their turn. On their turn, a player must say an answer to the category beginning with an available letter, press the corresponding letter lever to eliminate that letter for the round, then press the button to reset the timer before passing the turn. If a player either does not complete their turn within 10 seconds, says a word starting with a letter that has been eliminated, or gives an unacceptable answer for the category, they are eliminated from the round. The round ends when only one player remains and that player receives the round's category card.

The winner is the first player to collect three category cards.

== Reception ==
Tapple was a winner of the 2014 Play Advances Language Awards, and was featured in Games magazine's 2014 Game 100. Tapple 10 was the Creative Child Awards' 2016 Game of the Year, and won a Silver Honor at the 2016 Parents' Choice Awards.

In an article for GamesRadar+, Abigail Shannon praised Tapple's appeal to both children and adults and its flexible player count, praising the game by writing that "its premise is super simple and easy to get to grips with, but the time sensitivity adds a layer of challenge." The game featured in top 10 lists for both ABC13 Houston and Forbes.
