= Scrabble =

Crossword-style word making board game

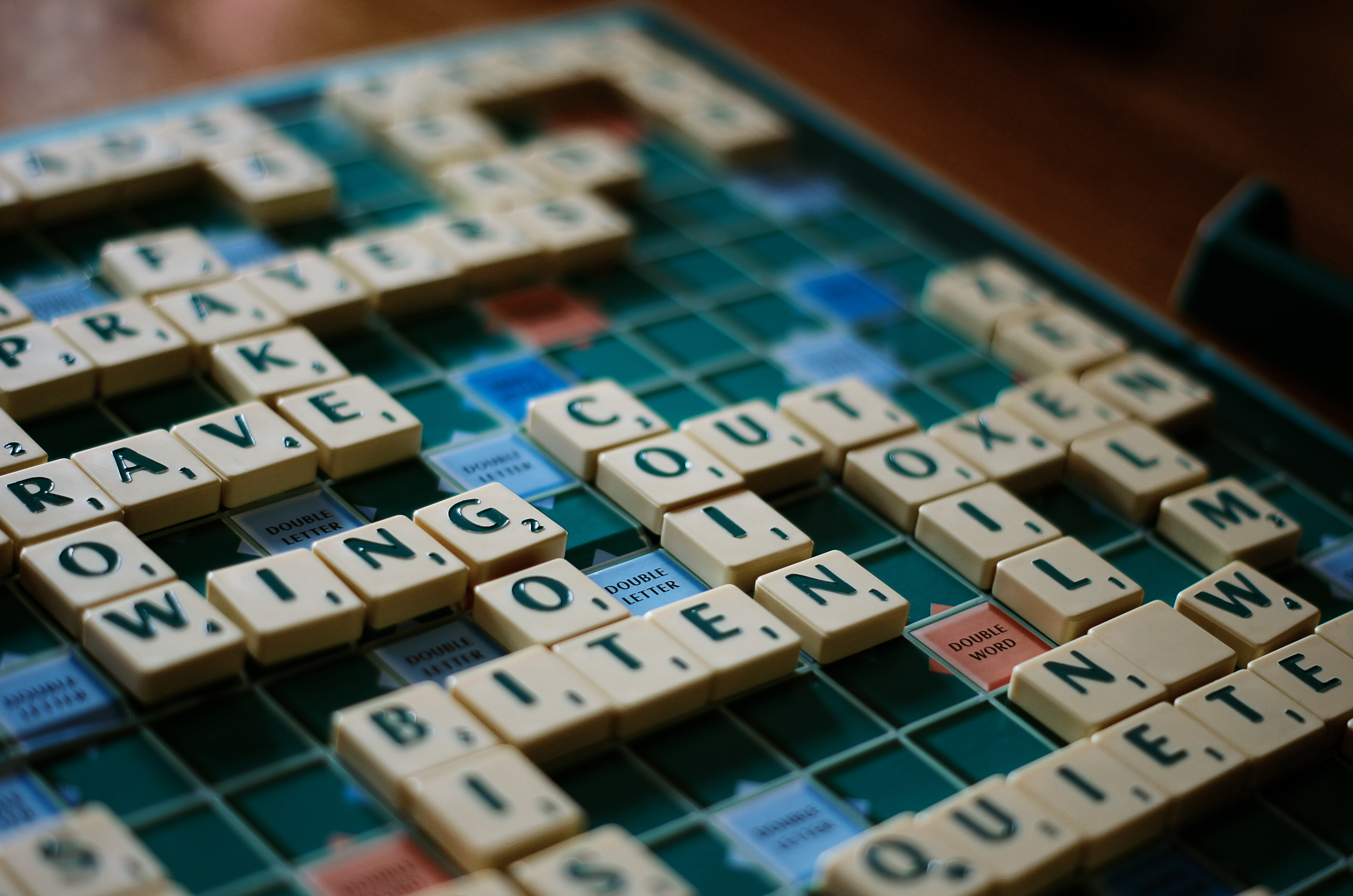
- A game of English-language Scrabble in progress
- Manufacturers: Hasbro (within U.S. and Canada); Mattel (outside U.S. and Canada)
- Designers: Alfred Mosher Butts
- Publishers: James Brunot
- Publication: 1948; 78 years ago
- Genres: Word game Board game
- Players: 2–4
- Setup time: 2–4 minutes
- Playing time: Tournament game: 50–60 minutes
- Chance: Medium (letters drawn)
- Skills: Vocabulary, spelling, anagramming, strategy, counting, bluffing, probability
- Website: Official website (Hasbro); Official website (Mattel)

Scrabble is a word game in which two to four players score points by placing tiles, each bearing a single letter, onto a game board divided into a 15×15 grid of squares. The tiles must form words that, in crossword fashion, read left to right in rows or downward in columns and are included in a standard dictionary or lexicon.

American architect Alfred Mosher Butts invented the game in 1931. Scrabble is produced in the United States and Canada by Hasbro, under the brands of both of its subsidiaries, Milton Bradley and Parker Brothers. Mattel owns the rights to manufacture Scrabble outside the U.S. and Canada. As of 2008, the game is sold in 121 countries and is available in more than 30 languages; approximately 150 million sets have been sold worldwide, and roughly one-third of American homes and half of British homes have a Scrabble set. There are approximately 4,000 Scrabble clubs around the world.

== Equipment ==
Scrabble is played on a 15x15 board, containing 225 squares. Certain squares are premium squares: eight red triple word score (TWS) squares, 17 pink double word score (DWS) squares, including the center square (h8, often marked with a star or other symbol), 12 blue triple letter score (TLS) squares, and 24 light blue double letter score (DLS) squares. In 2008, Hasbro changed the colors of the premium squares to orange, red, green, and blue for TWS, DWS, TLS, and DLS respectively, but the original premium square color scheme is still preferred for Scrabble boards used in tournaments. Boards with a raised grid and the ability to rotate are standard in tournaments.

The name of the game spelled out in game tiles from the English-language version. Each tile is marked with its point value, with a blank tile—the game's equivalent of a wild card—played as the word's first letter. The blank tile is worth zero points.

An English-language set contains 100 tiles, 98 of which are marked with a letter and a point value between 1 and 10. Each tile's point value is based on its frequency in English, with vowels and common letters such as L, N, R, S, and T worth 1 point, and rare letters such as Q and Z worth 10 points. The remaining two tiles are blank and carry no value. Other language sets use different letter set distributions with different point values. Tiles are usually made of wood or plastic and are 19 by 19 millimetres (0.75 in × 0.75 in) square and 4 mm (0.16 in) thick, slightly smaller than the squares on the board. Each player uses a rack that conceals their tiles from other players.

A	B	C	D	E	F	G	H	I	J	K	L	M	N	O
1	3× WS	2× LS	3× WS	2× LS	3× WS	1
2	2× WS	3× LS	3× LS	2× WS	2
3	2× WS	2× LS	2× LS	2× WS	3
4	2× LS	2× WS	2× LS	2× WS	2× LS	4
5	2× WS	2× WS	5
6	3× LS	3× LS	3× LS	3× LS	6
7	2× LS	2× LS	2× LS	2× LS	7
8	3× WS	2× LS	2× LS	3× WS	8
9	2× LS	2× LS	2× LS	2× LS	9
10	3× LS	3× LS	3× LS	3× LS	10
11	2× WS	2× WS	11
12	2× LS	2× WS	2× LS	2× WS	2× LS	12
13	2× WS	2× LS	2× LS	2× WS	13
14	2× WS	3× LS	3× LS	2× WS	14
15	3× WS	2× LS	3× WS	2× LS	3× WS	15
A	B	C	D	E	F	G	H	I	J	K	L	M	N	O
Triple word score Double word score	Triple letter score Double letter score
The official Scrabble board design

== History ==
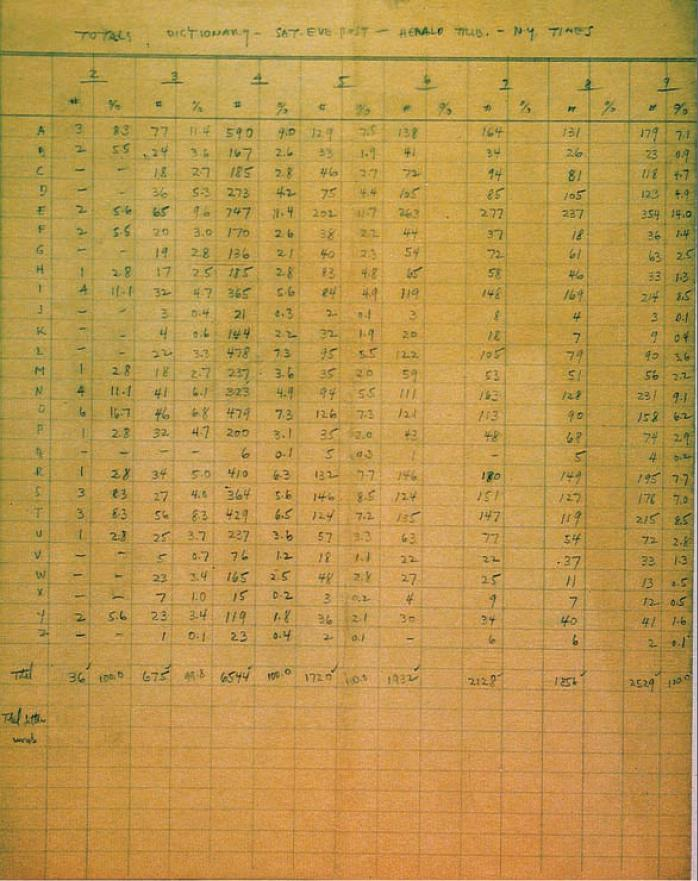
Alfred Butts manually tabulated the frequency of letters in words of various length, using examples in a dictionary, the Saturday Evening Post, the New York Herald Tribune, and The New York Times. This was used to determine the number and scores of tiles in the game.

In 1931 in Jackson Heights, Queens, the American architect Alfred Mosher Butts created the game as a variation on an earlier word game he invented, called Lexiko. The two games had the same set of letter tiles, whose distributions and point values Butts worked out by performing a frequency analysis of letters from various sources, including The New York Times. The new game, which he called Criss-Crosswords, added the 15×15 gameboard and the crossword-style gameplay. He manufactured a few sets himself but was not successful in selling the game to any major game manufacturers of the day.

In 1948, James Brunot, a resident of Newtown, Connecticut, and one of the few owners of the original Criss-Crosswords game, bought the rights to manufacture the game in exchange for granting Butts a royalty on every unit sold. Although he left most of the game (including the distribution of letters) unchanged, Brunot slightly rearranged the "premium" squares of the board and simplified the rules; he also renamed the game Scrabble, a real word that means "scratch frantically". In 1949, Brunot and his family made sets in a converted former schoolhouse in Dodgingtown, Connecticut, a section of Newtown. They made 2,400 sets that year but lost money.

In 1952, unable to meet demand himself, Brunot licensed the manufacturing rights to Long Island-based Selchow and Righter, one of the manufacturers that, like Parker Brothers and Milton Bradley Company, had previously rejected the game. "It's a nice little game. It will sell well in bookstores," Selchow and Righter president Harriet T. Righter remembered saying about Scrabble when she first saw it. In its second year as a Selchow and Righter product, 1954, nearly four million sets were sold. Selchow and Righter then bought the trademark to the game in 1972.

Selchow and Righter imported Scrabble tiles for the North American market from a factory in Germany until 1979, when they, and subsequent owners of the Scrabble brand, moved North American tile production to the United States for roughly two decades. From 1979 to 1998 Scrabble tiles for the North American market were produced in Fairfax, Vermont, and packaged for distribution and sale in East Longmeadow, Massachusetts. At its busiest, the 55,000-square-foot Fairfax factory produced over one million Scrabble tiles a day and employed more than 150 people.

Meanwhile, J. W. Spear & Sons acquired the rights to sell the game in Australia and the UK on January 19, 1955. In 1986, Selchow and Righter was sold to Coleco, which soon afterward went bankrupt. Hasbro then purchased Coleco's assets in 1989, including Scrabble and Parcheesi. Mattel then acquired JW Spear in 1994. Since then, Hasbro has owned the rights to manufacture Scrabble in the U.S. and Canada, and Mattel has held the rights to manufacture the game in other parts of the world.

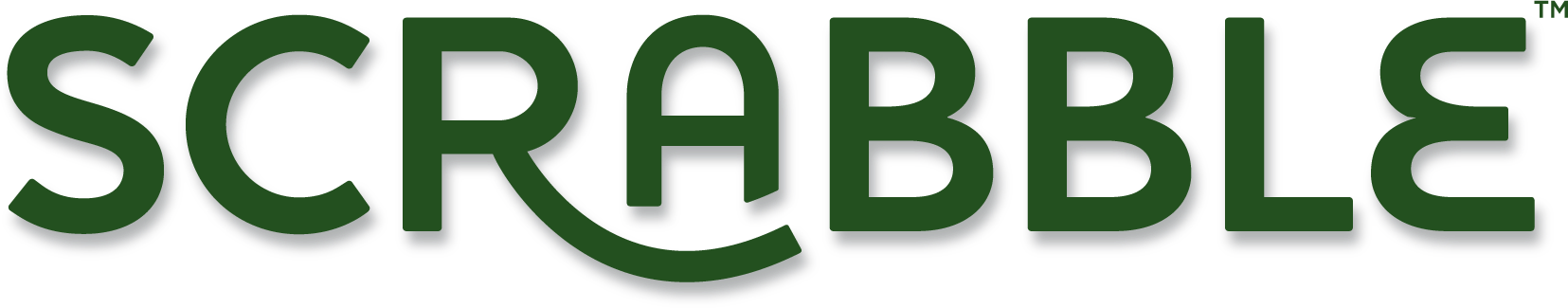
Scrabble logo used by Mattel from 2013 to 2020

Scrabble logo used by Hasbro in the United States and Canada until 2008

In 1984, Scrabble was adapted into a daytime game show on NBC. The Scrabble game show ran from July 1984 to March 1990, with a second run from January to June 1993. The show was hosted by Chuck Woolery. Its tagline in promotional broadcasts was, "Every man dies; not every man truly Scrabbles." In 2011, a new TV variation of Scrabble, called Scrabble Showdown, aired on The Hub cable channel, which is a joint venture of Discovery Communications, Inc. and Hasbro.

Scrabble was inducted into the National Toy Hall of Fame in 2004.

=== Evolution of the rules ===
The "box rules" included in each copy of the North American edition have been edited four times: in 1953, 1976, 1989, and 1999.

The major changes in 1953 were as follows.

- It was made clear that:
  - words could be played through single letters already on the board,
  - a player could play a word parallel and immediately adjacent to an existing word provided all crossing words formed were valid,
  - the effect of two premium squares was to be compounded multiplicatively.
- The previously unspecified penalty for having one's play successfully challenged was stated: withdrawal of tiles and loss of turn.

The major changes in 1976 were as follows.

- It was made clear that the blank tile beats an A when drawing to see who goes first.
- A player could pass their turn, doing nothing.
- A loss-of-turn penalty was added for challenging an acceptable play.
- If final scores are tied, the player whose score was highest before adjusting for unplayed tiles is the winner; in tournament play, a tie is counted as half a win for both players.

The editorial changes made in 1989 did not affect gameplay.

The major changes in 1999 were as follows.

- It was made clear that:
  - a tile can be shifted or replaced until the play has been scored,
  - a challenge applies to all the words made in the given play.
- Playing all seven tiles is officially called a "bingo" in North America and a "bonus" elsewhere.
- A change in the wording of the rules could have been interpreted as meaning that a player may form more than one word on one row on a single turn.

== Rules ==
Before the game, a word list or dictionary is selected in order to adjudicate any challenges during the game. In club and tournament play, the word list is specified in advance, typically the Official Scrabble Players Dictionary, Collins Scrabble Words, or the NASPA Word List. All 100 tiles are placed into an opaque bag. To decide who goes first, each player selects 1 tile from the bag, and whoever selects the tile alphabetically closest to "A" goes first, with blanks superseding all letters. Each player then draws seven tiles and places them on their rack, hidden from other players.

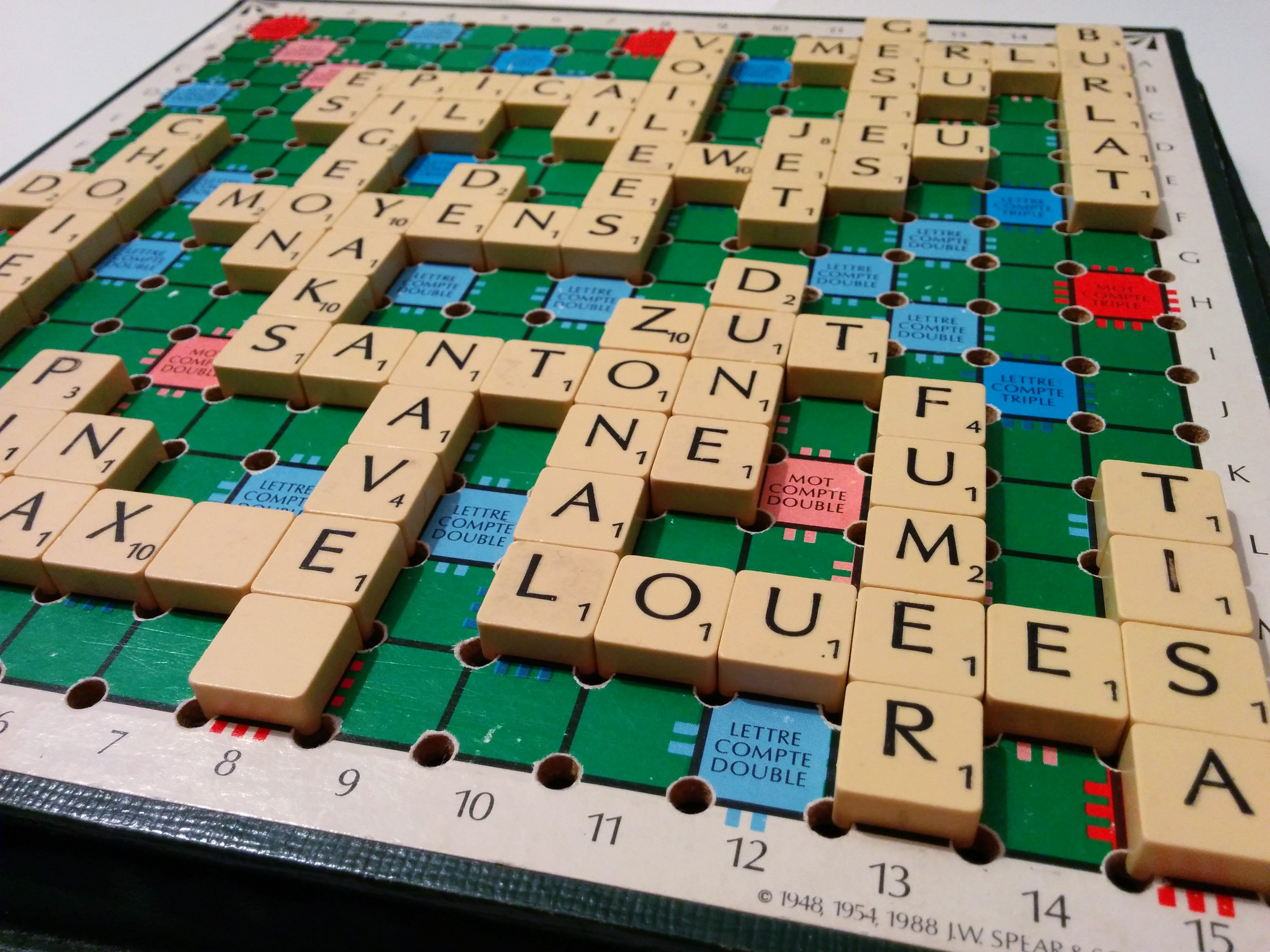
A game of Scrabble in French

=== Gameplay ===
On every turn, the player at turn can perform one of the following options:

- Pass, forfeiting the turn and scoring zero.
- Exchange one or more tiles for an equal number from the bag, scoring zero. This can only be done if 7 or more tiles remain in the bag.
- Play at least one tile on the board, adding the value of all words formed to the player's cumulative score.

The first play of the game must consist of at least two tiles and cover the center square (H8). Any play thereafter must use at least one of the player's tiles to form a "main word" (containing all of the player's played tiles in a straight line) reading left-to-right or top-to-bottom. Diagonal plays are not allowed. At least one tile must be adjacent (horizontally or vertically) to a tile already on the board. If the play includes a blank tile, the player must designate the letter the blank represents; that letter remains unchanged for the rest of the game unless the play is challenged off. The player announces the score for that play, then draws replenishment tiles from the bag. If the game is played using a clock, the player starts the opponent's clock after announcing the score and before drawing tiles. Players may keep track of tiles played during the game.

If a player has made a play and not yet drawn a tile, any other player may choose to challenge any or all words formed by the play. The challenged word(s) are then searched in the agreed-upon word list or dictionary. If at least one challenged word is unacceptable, the play is removed from the board, and the player scores zero for that turn. If all challenged words are acceptable, the challenger loses their turn. In tournament play, players are not entitled to know which word(s) are invalid or the definitions of any challenged words. Penalties for unsuccessfully challenging an acceptable play vary in club and tournament play and are described in greater detail below.

==== End of game ====
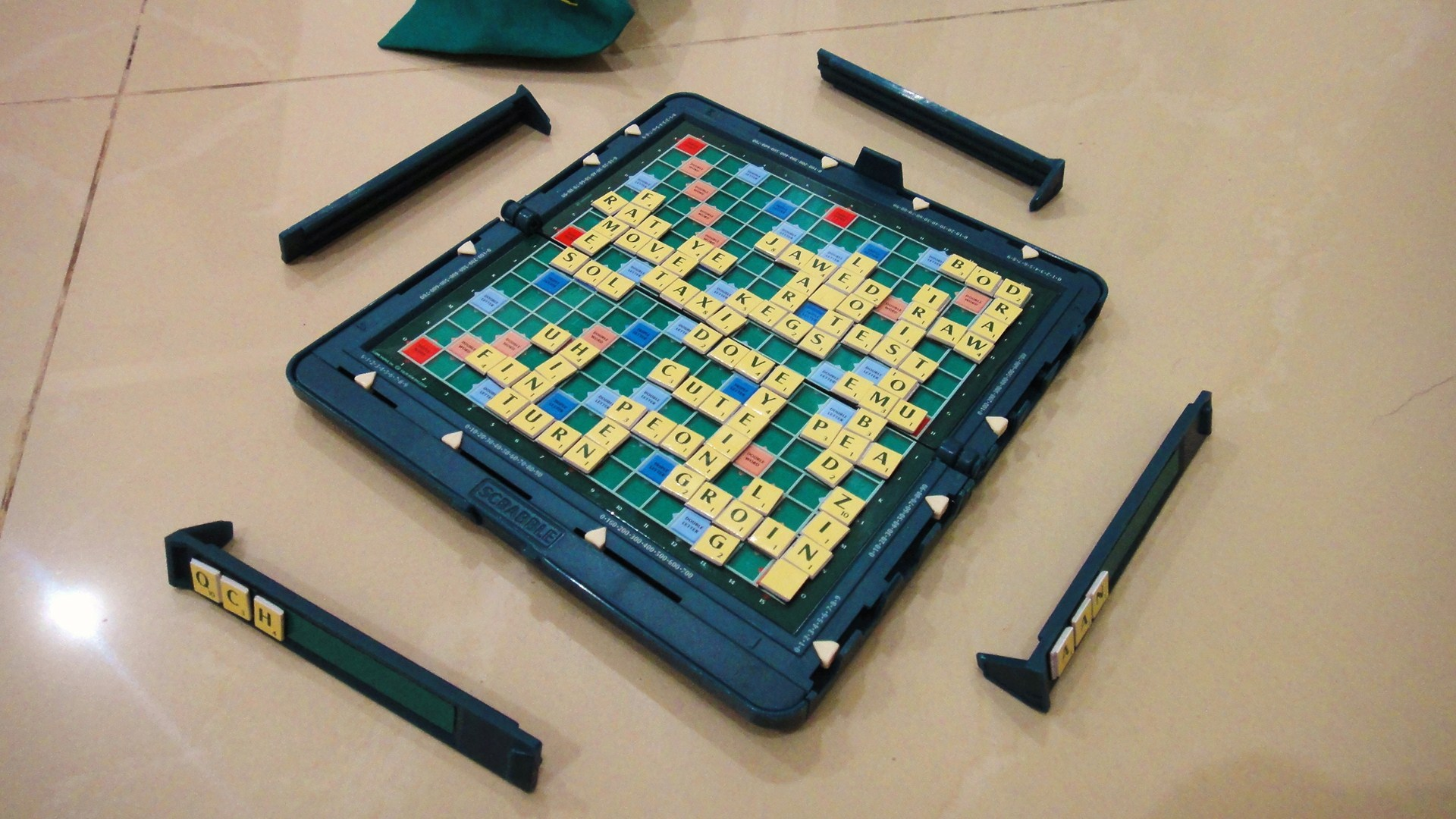
A game of magnetic Pocket Scrabble approaching its end, when players have fewer than seven tiles remaining

The game ends when either:

- One player has played every tile on their rack ("playing out") and no tiles remain in the bag.
- At least six consecutive scoreless turns have occurred and either player decides to end the game.
- In tournament play, when either player exceeds 10 minutes of overtime.

At the end of the game, each player's score is reduced by the sum of the values of their unplayed tiles; if a player plays out, the sum of all other players' unplayed tiles is added to that player's score. This scoring adjustment differs slightly in most tournaments; a player who plays out adds twice this sum, and the opponent's score is unchanged.

=== Scoring ===
Premium square colors
Square	Original version	Mattel version (2020-)	Mattel version (2012–2020)	Hasbro Version (2008–2014)
Double letter (DLS)	Light blue	Dark blue	Light blue	Bright blue
Triple letter (TLS)	Blue	Hot pink	Blue	Green
Double word (DWS)	Pink	Yellow	Yellow	Red
Triple word (TWS)	Red	Light green	Red	Orange

Every letter is assigned a point value between 1 and 10, inclusive, with blanks worth zero points. The score of a play is calculated using the following rules:

- The score of a play equals the sum of the scores of all new words formed on that play.
- The score of every new word formed equals the sum of the point values of the letter(s) in that word. If a play covers any premium squares (such as DLS or TWS squares, including the center star H8), the point value of the corresponding letter or word is multiplied by 2 or 3 respectively.
- Premium squares only apply when newly placed tiles cover them. Any subsequent plays do not count these premium squares. A play that covers a DWS or TWS multiplies the value of the entire word(s) by 2 or 3, including tiles already on the board.
- If a newly placed word covers both letter and word premium squares, the letter premiums are calculated first, followed by the word premiums.
- If a word covers two DWS squares, the value of that word is doubled, then redoubled (i.e., 4× the word value). Similarly, if the main word covers two TWS squares, the value of that word is tripled, then re-tripled (9× the word value). Such plays are often referred to as "double-doubles" and "triple-triples" respectively.
- A play using all 7 of the player's tiles (known as a "bingo" in North America and as a "bonus" elsewhere) earns a 50-point bonus to its score.

Scoreless turns can occur when a player passes, exchanges tiles, loses a challenge, or otherwise makes an illegal move. A scoreless turn can also occur if a play consists of only blank tiles, but this is extremely unlikely in actual play.

==== Scoring example ====
See the example game at right.

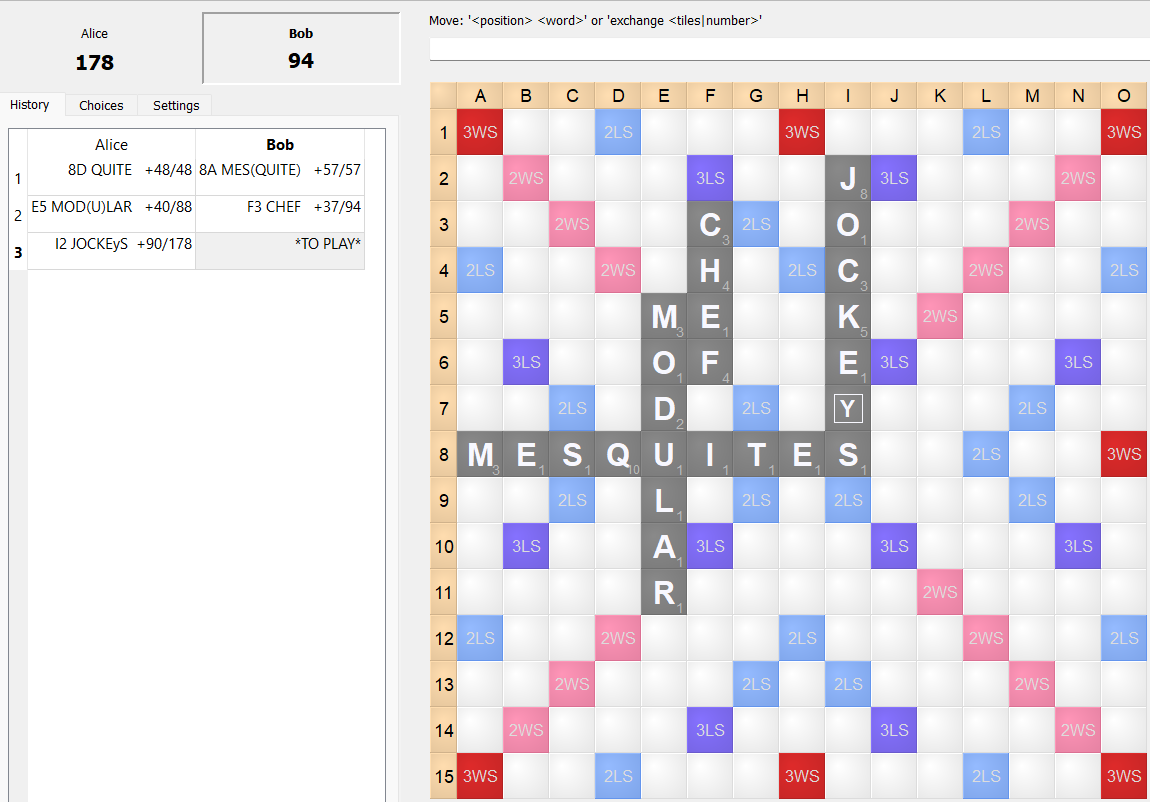
Example game played using Quackle, an open-source program. The plays 8D QUITE, 8A MES(QUITE), E5 MOD(U)LAR, F3 CHEF, and I2 JOCKEyS score 48, 57, 40, 37, and 90 points, respectively.

Alice opens with QUITE at 8D, with the Q on a DLS and the E on the center star (H8). Because the center star is a DWS, the score for this play is $({\color{Cyan} \bf 2} \times 10 + 1 + 1 + 1 + 1) \times {\color{CarnationPink} \bf 2} = 48$ points.

Next, suppose Bob extends the play to form the word MES(QUITE) at 8A with the M on the TWS at 8A. The score for this play is $(3 + 1 + 1 + 10 + 1 + 1 + 1 + 1) \times {\color{red} \bf 3} = 57$ points. In particular, the Q is not doubled, since it was not played on this turn.

Next, suppose Alice plays MOD(U)LAR at E5. Because this word covers two DWS squares on E5 and E11, the score for this play is quadrupled. The score for this play is $(3+1+2+1+1+1+1)\times {\color{CarnationPink} \bf 2} \times {\color{CarnationPink} \bf 2} = 40$ points.

Next, suppose Bob plays CHEF at F3, forming the words ME and OF. Because the F is on a TLS at F6 and is used in the newly-formed words CHEF and OF, the TLS is applied on both words:

- Score for CHEF: $3+4+1+({\color{blue} \bf 3} \times 4) = 20$ points
- Score for ME: $3+1=4$ points
- Score for OF: $1 + ({\color{blue} \bf 3} \times 4) = 13$ points

The score for this play is $20+4+13 = 37$ points.

Next, suppose Alice plays JOCKEyS at I2 with a blank representing the Y, forming the word MESQUITES. The O and blank Y cover the DLS squares at I3 and I7:

- Score for JOCKEyS: $8 + ({\color{Cyan} \bf 2} \times 1) + 3 + 5 + 1 + ({\color{Cyan} \bf 2} \times 0) + 1 = 20$ points
- Score for MESQUITES: $3+1+1+10+1+1+1+1+1=20$ points

Because this play used all 7 of Alice's tiles, a 50-point bonus is added. The score for this play is $20+20+50=90$ points.

=== Acceptable words ===
All words of length 2 to 15 letters that appear in the agreed-upon dictionary or lexicon are acceptable words in Scrabble, as are all their inflected forms and plurals. Several popular lexica are used in English-language Scrabble, including but not limited to:

- The Official Scrabble Players Dictionary (OSPD) is a common standard for casual games.
- Collins Scrabble Words (CSW or "Collins", formerly known as SOWPODS and OSW) is the international standard for competitive play.
- NASPA Word List (NWL, formerly known as OTCWL, OWL, and TWL) is used in most—but not all—tournaments in the United States and Canada.

In general, proper nouns, contractions, and other words requiring capitalization or other punctuation are not allowed unless they also appear as acceptable entries; for example, words such as HERES, JACK, and TEXAS, while typically containing an apostrophe or considered a proper noun, have unrelated definitions and are therefore acceptable in major Scrabble lexica. Similarly, acronyms and abbreviations are generally not allowed unless they have separate entries (such as AWOL, RADAR, SCUBA, and WYSIWYG). Variant spellings (such as COLOUR vs. COLOR, or TSAR vs. CZAR), slang or offensive terms, archaic or obsolete terms, and specialized jargon words are acceptable if they meet all other criteria for acceptability, but archaic spellings (e.g., NEEDE or MAKETH) are generally not acceptable. Foreign words are generally not allowed in English-language Scrabble unless they have been incorporated into the English language, such as QI, KILIM, and PATISSERIE. Notably, transliterated spellings of letters (such as ALPHA, XI, BETH, ALIF, DEE, and AITCH) are acceptable in all major Scrabble lexica. Vulgar and offensive words are generally excluded from the OSPD but allowed in club and tournament play. The North American Scrabble Players Association removed slurs from its lexicon in 2020, after conducting a poll of its members. Mattel removed 400 derogatory terms from its official word list in 2021, in response to the Black Lives Matter movement, with the company's head of games saying: "Can you imagine any other game where you can score points and win by using a racial epithet? It's long overdue." This does not prevent players from playing these words, as it is within the rules of the game to play unacceptable words (at the risk of losing a challenge).

==== NWL and OSPD ====
Today's NASPA Word List (NWL), published by NASPA Games, descends from the Official Tournament and Club Word List (a non-bowdlerized version of the Official Scrabble Players Dictionary) and its companion Long Words List for longer words. The current version of NWL is NWL2023, effective February 2024, and the Official Scrabble Players Dictionary, published by Merriam-Webster, is currently in its seventh edition of 2022. NWL includes all current OSPD words, plus several hundred offensive words and genericized trademarks such as KLEENEX; as of 2020, it no longer includes words judged to be personally applicable offensive slurs.

The NWL and OSPD are compiled using a number of major college-level dictionaries, principally those published by Merriam-Webster. If a word appears, at least historically, in any one of the dictionaries, it is included in the NWL and the OSPD. If the word has only an offensive meaning, it is included only in the NWL. The key difference between the OSPD and the NWL is that the OSPD is marketed for "home and school" use, without words which their source dictionaries judged offensive, rendering the Official Scrabble Players Dictionary less fit for official Scrabble play. The OSPD is available in bookstores, while the NWL is available only through NASPA.

==== Collins Scrabble Words ====
In most other English-speaking countries, the primary competition word list is Collins Scrabble Words 2024 edition, known as CSW24. Historically, this list has contained all OTCWL words plus words sourced from the Chambers and Collins English dictionaries, but recent editorial decisions have caused greater discrepancies between CSW and NWL.

Tournaments are also played using CSW in North America, particularly since Hasbro ceased to control tournament play in 2009. NASPA, the Word Game Players Organization, and Collins Coalition (CoCo) all sanction CSW tournaments, using separate Elo rating systems.

==== Other lexica ====
The Word Game Players Organization, a separate organization which sanctions Scrabble tournaments throughout North America, uses its own lexicon, WGPO Official Words (WOW24). This lexicon retains the offensive slurs which were removed from NWL. However, there are several other discrepancies between the two lexica; for example, words such as SKIWEARS and GEEKING, which appear in NWL2023, do not appear in WOW24.

=== Challenges ===
The penalty for a successfully challenged play is nearly universal: the offending player removes the tiles played and forfeits their turn. The penalty for an unsuccessful challenge (where all words challenged in the play are deemed valid) varies considerably, including:

- Double challenge, in which an unsuccessfully challenging player must forfeit the next turn. This penalty is most common in North American (NASPA- or WGPO-sanctioned) club and tournament play. Because loss of a turn generally constitutes the greatest risk for an unsuccessful challenge, it provides the greatest incentive for a player to "bluff", or play a "phony" – a plausible word that they know or suspect to be unacceptable, hoping their opponent will not challenge it.
- Single or free challenge, in which no penalty whatsoever is applied to a player who unsuccessfully challenges. This rule is sometimes used in Australia, but is largely out of favor in major tournaments as a player can freely challenge words in order to unfairly gain extra playing time.
- Modified single, penalty, or 5-point challenge, in which an unsuccessful challenge does not result in the loss of the challenging player's turn, but is penalized by a 5-point (or other specified point) penalty. The rule has been adopted in Singapore (since 2000), Malaysia (since 2002), South Africa (since 2003), New Zealand (since 2004), and Kenya, as well as in contemporary World Scrabble Championships (since 2001) and North American (NASPA-sanctioned) Collins tournaments, and particularly prestigious Australian tournaments. Some countries and tournaments (including Sweden) use a 10-point penalty instead. In most game situations, this penalty is much lower than that of the "double challenge" rule. Consequently, such tournaments encourage greater willingness to challenge and discourage playing dubious words.

A fourth option, known as void or void challenge, is sometimes used in online versions of Scrabble, as well as related games such as Words with Friends. In this setting, unacceptable words are automatically rejected by the program. The player is then required to make a different play, with no penalty applied.

== Competitive play ==
=== Club and tournament play ===
Tens of thousands play club and tournament Scrabble worldwide. The rules and equipment in tournament Scrabble differ somewhat from those typically found in casual play. For example, all tournament (and most club) games are played with a game clock and a set time control. Because luck is a more significant factor in 3- and 4-player games, tournament games always involve two players, or occasionally two teams of players. A player who goes overtime does not immediately lose the game (as in chess), but is instead assessed a 10-point penalty per minute. Also, the original wooden tiles are not allowed in tournaments as it is possible for players to "feel" the tiles in the bag (especially blank tiles); thus, molded plastic tiles are often used. Players are allowed tracking sheets containing the tile distribution, from which tiles can be crossed off as they are played.

Regularly held major tournaments include:

1. The WESPA Championship (formerly the World Scrabble Championship): an invitational championship organized by WESPA.
2. The Scrabble Players Championship (formerly North American Scrabble Championship): organized by NASPA Games, an open event attracting several hundred players, held around July–August every year in the United States.
3. The National Scrabble Championship: organized by the Association of British Scrabble Players (ABSP) and held every year in the United Kingdom.
4. The Brand's Crossword Game King's Cup: the largest tournament in the world. Held annually in Thailand around the end of June or the beginning of July.
5. The UK Open: the largest Scrabble tournament in Europe, held annually in Coventry in England, since 2008.

Other important tournaments include:

1. The World Youth Scrabble Championships: entry by country qualification, restricted to under 18 years old. Held annually since 2006.
2. The National School Scrabble Championship: entry open to North American school students. Held annually since 2003.
3. The Canadian Scrabble Championship: entry by invitation only to the top fifty Canadian players. Held every two to three years.
4. The Singapore Open Scrabble Championship: international Singapore championship held annually since 1997.

Scrabble clubs typically meet weekly and may typically hold one or more open, sanctioned tournaments per year.

=== Records ===
The following records were achieved during sanctioned competitive club or tournament play, according to authoritative sources, including the book Everything Scrabble by Joe Edley and John D. Williams Jr. (revised edition, Pocket Books, 2001), the Scrabble FAQ, and the NASPA Wiki, which maintains a more comprehensive list of records. Separate records are listed based on different official lexica:

1. NWL (NASPA Word List), formerly known as TWL and OTCWL.
2. CSW (Collins Scrabble Words), formerly known as SOWPODS and OSW.

Record	NWL	CSW
High game	Club: 830 by Michael Cresta, 2006; Tournament: 803 by Joel Sherman, 2011	Tournament: 876 by Hasham Hadi Khan, 2014
High combined score	Club: 1320 (830–490) by Michael Cresta and Wayne Yorra, 2006; Tournament: 1157 (744–450) by Kenneth Rubin and Patrick Delisle, 2019	Tournament: 1210 (721–489) by Edward Okulicz and Michael McKenna, 2013
Highest single play	Club: 365 (QUIXOTRY) by Michael Cresta, 2006; Tournament: 311, multiple occurrences.	Tournament: 392 (CAZIQUES) by Karl Khoshnaw, 1982
Highest opening play	126 (Note: The highest possible legal opening play is MUZJIKS (with no blanks), scoring 128 points. (Note: The probability of drawing MUZJIKS without blanks is $\frac{2 \times 4 \times 1 \times 1 \times 9 \times 1 \times 4}{\binom{100}{7}}$, or roughly 1 in 55,581,808.)) (MuZJIKS) by Jesse Inman, 2008	Tournament: 124 (BEZIQUE) by Sam Kantimathi (1993), Joan Rosenthal and Sally Martin.

A high game of 1,049 points by Phil Appleby (UK) was recognized by Guinness World Records in 1989 but was not in a sanctioned club or tournament. Additional record scores are believed to have been achieved under a British format known as the "high score rule", in which a player's tournament result is determined only by the player's own scores, not by the differences between their scores and the opponent's scores. This format is currently out of favor.

Moreover, much higher-scoring plays are possible (e.g., plays covering three TWS squares) but extremely unlikely to occur without cooperation from both players. The highest reported score for a single play is 1,786 points, with OXYPHENBUTAZONE and seven other words created simultaneously. By adding the word SESQUIOXIDIZING to these official lists, one could theoretically score 2015 (OSPD) and 2044 (CSW) points in a single play. The highest reported combined score for a theoretical game based on SOWPODS is 4,054 points, constructed by Nathan Hedt of Australia. Other records are available at Total Scrabble, an unofficial record book that includes the above as sources and expands on other topics.

In August 1984, Peter Finan and Neil Smith played Scrabble for 153 hours at St. Anselm's College, setting a new duration record. A longer record was never recorded by Guinness Book of Records, as the publishers decided that duration records of this nature were becoming too dangerous and stopped accepting them.

== Software ==
=== Computer players ===
Maven is a computer opponent for the game created by Brian Sheppard.

Quackle is an open-source alternative to Maven of comparable strength, created by a five-person team led by Jason Katz-Brown. A Qt cross-platform version of Quackle is available on GitHub.

BestBot is an artificial intelligence that evaluates positions using a 5-ply simulation or greater per move, and exhaustively solves endgames with zero or one tiles in the bag. BestBot uses the Macondo engine, which is open source on GitHub and currently in beta. As of 2026, BestBot appears to be slightly better than human grandmasters. North American grandmaster Mack Meller has played three separate 100-game series against it, in all of which he recorded a negative net score, and two of which he lost.

=== Video game versions ===
Video game versions of Scrabble have been released for various platforms, including IBM PC compatibles, Mac, Amiga, Commodore 64, ZX Spectrum, Game Boy, Game Boy Color, Game Boy Advance, Nintendo DS, PlayStation, PlayStation 4, PlayStation Portable, iPod, iOS, Game.com, Palm OS, Amstrad CPC, Xbox 360, Kindle, Wii, and mobile phones.

The Nintendo DS version of Scrabble 2007 Edition made news when parents became angry over the game's AI using potentially offensive language during gameplay.

=== Web versions ===
Scrabble can be played online against other users on several websites, such as the Internet Scrabble Club, Pogo.com from Electronic Arts (North America only), and woogles.io.

Facebook initially offered a variation of Scrabble called Scrabulous as a third-party application add-on. On July 24, 2008, Hasbro filed a copyright infringement lawsuit against its developers. Four days later, Scrabulous was disabled for users in North America, eventually reappearing as "Lexulous" in September 2008, with changes made to distinguish it from Scrabble. By December 20, Hasbro had withdrawn its lawsuit.

Mattel launched its official version of online Scrabble, Scrabble by Mattel, on Facebook in late March 2008. The application was developed by Gamehouse, a division of RealNetworks that was licensed by Mattel. Since Hasbro controls the copyright for North America with the copyright for the rest of the world belonging to Mattel, the Gamehouse Facebook application was available only to players outside the United States and Canada. The version developed by Electronic Arts for Hasbro was available throughout the world.

When Gamehouse ceased support for its application, Mattel replaced it with the Electronic Arts version in May 2013. This decision was met with criticism from its userbase. The Hasbro version continues to be available worldwide but now uses IP lookup to display Hasbro branding to North American players and Mattel branding to the rest of the world. Electronic Arts have also released mobile apps for Android and iOS, allowing players to continue the same game on more than one platform.

As well as facilities to play occasional games online, there are many options to play in leagues.

In 2020, the license for Scrabble passed from Electronic Arts to Scopely, which launched the app Scrabble GO on March 5, 2020, with the Electronic Arts version discontinued on June 5, 2020. The new app was very different, leading to protests, and Scopely soon began to offer a 'Classic' version, without some of the extras initially offered: "this updated mode is reimagined to reflect the ask for a streamlined experience. Features such as boosts, rewards and all other game modes are disabled", the company announced.

== Variations ==
=== Super Scrabble ===
A new licensed product, Super Scrabble, was launched in North America by Winning Moves Games in 2004 under license from Hasbro, with the deluxe version (with turntable and lock-in grid) released in February 2007. A Mattel-licensed product for the rest of the world was released by Tinderbox Games in 2006. This set comprises 200 tiles in slightly modified distribution to the standard set and a 21×21 playing board.

=== National versions ===
Versions of the game have been released in several other languages.

The game was called Alfapet when it was introduced in Sweden in 1954, but since the mid-1990s, the game has also been known as Scrabble in Sweden. Alfapet is now another crossword game, developed by the owners of the name Alfapet. A Russian version is called Erudit. A Hebrew version is called Shabets Na (שבץ נא). Versions have been prepared for Dakotah, Haitian Creole, Dakelh (Carrier language), and Tuvan.

For languages with digraphs counted as single letters, such as Welsh and Hungarian, the game features separate tiles for those digraphs.

An Irish-language version of Scrabble was published by Glór na nGael in 2010. The previous year the same organisation published the Junior version of the game and two years later it republished Junior Scrabble using a two-sided (and two skill level) board.

=== Television game show version ===
In 1987, a board game was released by Selchow & Righter, based on the game show hosted by Chuck Woolery that aired on NBC from 1984 to 1990 (and for five months in 1993). Billed as the "Official Home Version" of the game show (or officially as the "TV Scrabble Home Game"), gameplay bears more resemblance to the game show than it does to a traditional Scrabble game, although it does utilize a traditional Scrabble gameboard in play.

=== Games based on Scrabble ===
There are numerous variations of the game. While they are similar to the original Scrabble game, they include minor variations. For example, Literati draws random tiles instead of providing a finite number of tiles for the game, assigns different point levels to each letter and has a slightly different board layout, whereas Lexulous assigns eight letters to each player instead of seven. Words with Friends uses a different board layout and different letter values, as does Words of Gold.

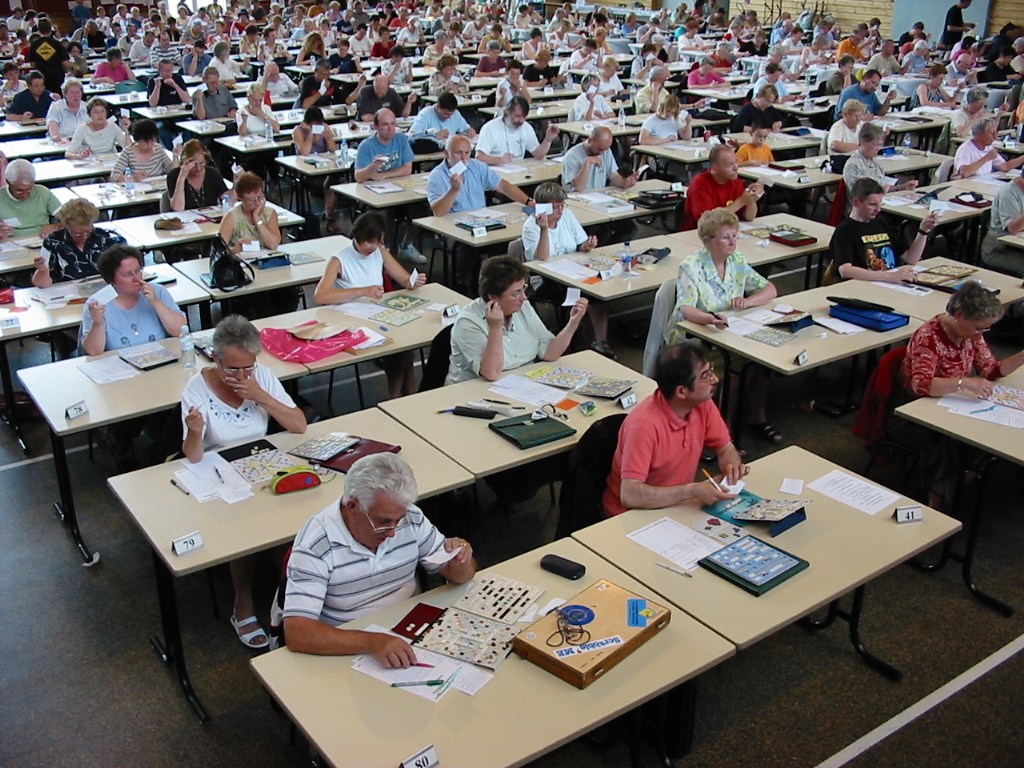
A duplicate Scrabble tournament in La Bresse, France

Duplicate Scrabble is a popular variant in French speaking countries. Every player has the same letters on the same board and the players must submit a paper slip at the end of the allotted time (usually 3 minutes) with the highest scoring word they have found. This is the format used for the French World Scrabble Championships but it is also used in Romanian and Dutch. There is no limit to the number of players that can be involved in one game, and at Vichy in 1998 there were 1,485 players, a record for French Scrabble tournaments.

Scarabeo is a variant that is much more popular in Italy than the original game. It features a 17×17 grid of cells and peculiar rules.

Popular among tournament Scrabble players is Clabbers. In Clabbers, any move that consists of anagrams of allowable words is allowed. For example, because ETAERIO is allowable in ordinary Collins Scrabble, EEAIORT would be allowable in Clabbers.

A junior version, called Junior Scrabble, has been marketed. This has slightly different distributions of frequencies of letter tiles to the standard Scrabble game.

Word games similar to or influenced by Scrabble include Bananagrams, Boggle, Dabble, Nab-It!, Perquackey, Puzzlage, Quiddler, Scribbage, Tapple, Upwords, and WordSpot.

There are also number-based variations, such as Equate.

== Gameboard formats ==
The game has been released in numerous gameboard formats appealing to various user groups. The original boards included wood tiles and many "deluxe" sets still do.

=== Tile Lock editions ===
Tile Lock editions of Scrabble and Super Scrabble are made by Winning Moves and feature smaller, plastic tiles that are held in place on the board with little plastic posts. The standard version features exactly the same 100 tiles as regular Scrabble. The Tile Lock Super Scrabble features the same 200 tiles that are in Super Scrabble.

=== Travel editions ===
Editions are available for travelers who may wish to play in a conveyance such as a train or plane or to pause a game in progress and resume later. Many versions thus include methods to keep letters from moving, such as pegboards, recessed tile holders and magnetic tiles. Players' trays are also designed with stay-fast holders. Such boards are also typically designed to be reoriented by each player to put the board upright during the game, as well as folded and stowed with the game in progress.

- Production and Marketing Company, 1954 – metal hinged box, Bakelite tiles inlaid with round magnets, chrome tile racks, silver-colored plastic bag and cardboard box covered with decorative paper. The box, when opened flat, measures 8 1/2 in × 7 3/4 in (22 cm × 20 cm) and the tiles measure 1/2 in (13 mm) square.
- Spear's Games, the 1980s – boxed edition with pegboard, plastic tiles with small feet to fit snugly in the pegboard. Racks are clear plastic, allowing some sorting while holding tiles fairly snugly. The set comes with a drawstring plastic bag to draw tiles and a cardboard box. It is possible to save a game in progress by returning the board to the box. There is a risk of players' trays being mixed and upset, and the box lid, held on by friction, is subject to upset.
- Selchow & Righter, 1980s – pocket edition with plastic "magnetic" board and tiles. Tile racks are also plastic with an asymmetrical shape to provide a handhold. All elements fit in a plastic envelope for travel and to permit a pause in the game. Plastic letters are very small and tend to lose their grip if not placed with slight lateral movement and if they are not perfectly clean. The game format is extremely small, allowing Scrabble games for backpackers and others concerned about weight and size.
- Hasbro Games, 2001 – hinged plastic board with clear tile-shaped depressions to hold tiles in play. Board is in a black, zippered folio such that board and tiles may be folded for travel, even with the game in play. The reverse side of the board contains numbered mounts for racks, holding tiles face down, allowing secure and confidential storage of tiles while a game is paused. Some versions have tile racks with individual tile slots, thus not permitting easy sorting of tiles in a rack. The board, when opened up, measures 24.5 cm × 21.0 cm (9 3/4 in × 8 1/4 in), and the tiles are 12.3 mm × 12.3 mm × 6.7 mm (1/2 in × 1/2 in × 1/4 in) in size.

=== Deluxe editions ===
At the opposite end, some "deluxe" or "prestige" editions offer superior materials and features. These include editions on a rotating turntable, so players can always face the board, with the letters upright and a raised grid that holds the tiles in place. Also available are alternative Scrabble boards, often made of glass or hardwood, that have superior rotating mechanisms and personalized graphics.

=== Large print and braille editions ===
An edition has been released (in association with the Royal National Institute of Blind People (RNIB)) with a larger board and letters for players with impaired vision. The colours on the board are more contrasting, and the font size has been increased from 16 to 24 point. The tiles are in bold 48 point, and have braille labels. A separate braille edition is also available.

=== World's smallest edition ===
Released by Super Impulse, "World's Smallest Scrabble" measures 3 × 1.75 × 0.5 inches. It has the full gameplay of the standard version, with a board, a case, and 99 magnetic tiles. It is available worldwide, with Hasbro branding in the U.S. and Canada and Mattel branding elsewhere.

== Works related to Scrabble ==
=== Books ===
Numerous books about Scrabble have been published, including nonfiction titles helping players improve their game, and fiction titles using the game as a plot device. These include:

- Merriam-Webster's The Official Scrabble Player's Dictionary, the Seventh Edition of which was published in 2023. The OSPD is the consistently best-selling official Scrabble book.
- Collins' Scrabble Dictionary: The Official Scrabble Solver, the Sixth Edition of which was published in 2022.
- Word Freak by Stefan Fatsis (2001), an introduction to tournament Scrabble and its players. While writing the book, Fatsis became a high-rated tournament player.
- The Scrabble Player's Handbook, edited by Stewart Holden and Kenji Matsumoto, and written by an international group of tournament players, which gives the information a serious player needs to advance to successful tournament play. Not to be confused with Drue K. Conklin's 1976 The Official Scrabble Player's Handbook, The Scrabble Player's Handbook is available for free online.

=== Documentaries ===
Numerous documentaries have been made about the game, including:

- Scrabylon (2003), by Scott Petersen, which "gives an up-close look at why people get so obsessed with that seemingly benign game"
- Word Slingers (2002), by Eric Siblin and Stefan Vanderland (produced for the Canadian Broadcasting Corporation), which follows four expert Canadian players at the 2001 World Championship in Las Vegas
- Lost for Words (2004) by Joshua Whitehead
- Word Wars (2004) by Eric Chaikin and Julian Petrillo, about the "tiles and tribulations on the Scrabble game circuit"

=== Game shows ===
Scrabble has been adapted into multiple television game shows.

- Scrabble, hosted by Chuck Woolery, aired on NBC from 1984 to 1990, and again in 1993.
- TV Scrabble aired on the British channel Challenge TV from 2001 to 2003.
- Scrabble Showdown aired on American channel The Hub from 2011 to 2012.
- Scrabble, hosted by Raven-Symoné, began airing on American network The CW in 2024. Craig Ferguson took over as host in Season 2.

== See also ==
- Anagrams – Public domain game, predecessor to Scrabble
- Bananagrams
- Blanagram
- Boggle
- Countdown (game show)
- List of tournament Scrabble players
- RSVP (board game)
- Scrabble in Hong Kong
- Upwords
- Words with Friends
- Wordscraper
- Jenga
- Wordfeud
