= Selchow and Righter =

Game publisher

- The company's last logo The company's historical logo
- Industry: Games
- Founded: 1867; 159 years ago (as E. G. Selchow & Co)
- Defunct: 1986 (Games); The trademark was not sold.
- Fate: Closed, Games sold.
- Successor: Coleco Industries, Inc.
- Headquarters: Bay Shore, New York, New York, U.S.

Selchow and Righter was a 19th- and 20th-century game manufacturer best known for the games Parcheesi and Scrabble. It was based in Bay Shore, New York.

It dates back to 1867 when it was founded as E. G. Selchow & Co. In 1880, to reflect his new partnership with John Righter, the company name was changed to Selchow and Righter. Games were also produced by Chaffee & Selchow, particularly between 1897 and 1902. Until the mid-twentieth century Selchow and Righter was considered a "jobber", a game company that produced and licensed other peoples' games. Under the leadership of John Righter's daughter, Harriet T. Righter, who was the company's president from 1923 to 1954, Selchow and Righter began manufacturing games, and put more emphasis on advertising and marketing campaigns.

Their first hit was Parcheesi, which they purchased the rights to in 1870 and trademarked in 1874. In 1952 they licensed Scrabble from James Brunot, then purchased that trademark in 1972. Other notable S&R games include Anagrams (1934), which is a Victorian word game, originally published by Selchow and Righter, Jotto (1955), which was licensed by Selchow and Righter in the 1970s, and Trivial Pursuit, which was licensed from Horn Abbot in 1982.

Other games which were produced by Selchow and Righter:

- Allstate Travel Games (from the box cover: "Designed specifically for use in auto. For ages six to 14")
- Alphabet City
- Assembly Line
- Blast Off
- Cap-It
- Cargoes
- Cabby
- Dr.Tangle
- Games Galore!
- Glib (1983) - A game for the Atari 2600 developed by Qualtronic Devices, Inc.
- Globe-Trotters
- Go for Broke
- Home Team Baseball
- Huggin' the Rail
- Jamboree
- Kommissar (1966)
- Straightaway (1961) – based on the 1961–1962 television series Straightaway
- Karate (1964)
- Meet the Presidents
- Plantem (sometime between 1928 and 1955, described as a “colorful intensely interesting game for young and old!”) 2, 3, or 4 players roll dice with letters Y, R, G, W, and P to signify colors yellow, red, green, white and purple, the colors of the flowers you “plant” on your board. The last side of the die has a black dot which when rolled allows you to steal a flower from another’s garden. Your goal is to complete your garden (five rows with five flowers each) first.
- Whodunit (1972) A similar game to Clue in which 6 players move around the board as investigators, obtaining opportunities to view other player's "alibi" tokens and collecting other "clues" to the identify of the murderer, weapon used, room in which committed, and a new category: motive. Whodunit draws on a similar setting and character types, including a colonel and maid, but in which the suspects are not the players.
- Mr. Ree! (1937)
- Parcheesi
- Prospecting
- Speed
- Super Market
- Snake Eyes
- The Game of Alice in Wonderland (1882)
- Towers (1891)
- Trivial Pursuit (U.S. licensee, 1982–88)
- Ur: Royal Game of Sumer
- Scrabble People (card game for ages 4–8, copyright 1985)

Selchow and Righter was purchased by Coleco Industries in 1986 for $75 million USD in cash and notes. Coleco Industries purchased the games from Selchow & Righter.

In 1988, Coleco declared bankruptcy and its primary assets were purchased by Hasbro for US$85,000,000 (equivalent to $220,771,812 in 2025) in cash, plus options to buy one million shares of Hasbro stock at a price of $28.85 (at the time the deal closed, Hasbro stock was worth only $20 a share).

Trojan Powder Coating, Tri-State Powder Coating, and Williams Architecture now occupy the site of the former Selchow and Righter building.
