= Bell and Hammer =

19th-century board game popular in Europe

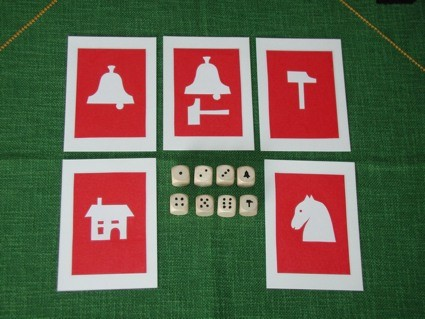
Bell and Hammer cards and dice

Bell and Hammer or Whitehorse is a dice game, which was quite popular in Europe in the 19th and early 20th centuries.

It is often assumed that the inventor was the Viennese art dealer Heinrich Friedrich Müller (1779-1848), but although Müller contributed greatly to the spread of the game, there is no evidence that he was the inventor. In German, the game is known as Glocke und Hammer or Schimmel.

Especially among the Jewish population, it was a very popular pastime during the Hanukkah festival, as well as the Dreidel game. After the Second World War, the game almost completely disappeared.
