= Boys (surname) =

Boys is a surname. Notable people with the surname include:

- C. V. Boys (1845–1944), English physicist
- Daniel Boys (born 26 March 1979) English musical theater actor
- David Boys (died 1461), English theologian
- David Boys (Scrabble), Canadian Scrabble player, 1995 world champion
- Edward Boys (disambiguation)
- Frank Boys (1918–2003), English cricketer
- John Boys (disambiguation)
- Richard Boys (disambiguation)
- S. Francis Boys (1911–1972), English theoretical chemist
- Thomas Boys (1792–1880), theologian and antiquary
- Thomas Shotter Boys (1803–1874), water-colour painter
- William Boys (disambiguation)

== See also ==
- Joseph Beuys (1921–1986), German artist
