= World Scrabble Championship 1999 =

- 4 November 1999 – 7 November 1999
- Winner: Joel Wapnick
- Number of players: 98
- Location: Melbourne
- Sponsor: Mattel

The World Scrabble Championship 1999 was the fifth World Scrabble Championship and was held at the Carlton Crest Hotel, Melbourne, Australia.

The winner was Joel Wapnick of Canada. This was the second time a player representing Canada has won, the first being when David Boys won in 1995. The 1991 champion, Peter Morris, was also a Canadian but represented the United States.

Eight games were played on each of the first three days with the top two players advancing to a best-of-five finals.

In the first game, Wapnick opened with the bingo CHAPLET and took a 249–60 lead three turns later with the double -double FILTHIER then cruised to a 624–307 victory. Nyman took the second game and Wapnick took the third then got off to an early lead in the fourth before losing a turn when he tried the phony FUROUR. The game remained tight, with both players getting down two bingos, until Wapnick drew the X and DEOXY for 50 to take a one -point lead and take the last tile out of the bag. With Wapnick having multiple places to go out, Nyman was unable to catch him and lost by a single point. Joel Wapnick could now add a world title to his US national title and Canadian title, one of only two players to have won the big three.

== Complete Results ==
| Position | Name | Country | Win–loss | Spread | Prize (USD) |
|---|---|---|---|---|---|
| 1 | Wapnick, Joel | Canada | 18–6 | +1068 | 15,000 |
| 2 | Nyman, Mark | England | 17–7 | +808 | 7,500 |
| 3 | Boys, David | Canada | 17–7 | +693 | 3,000 |
| 4 | Logan, Adam | Canada | 16–8 | +886 | 2,000 |
| 5 | Fisher, Andrew | England | 16–8 | +797 | 1,500 |
| 6 | Byers, Russell | England | 16–8 | +647 | 1,250 |
| 7 | Tiekert, Ron | United States | 16–8 | +366 | 1,000 |
| 8 | Richards, Nigel | New Zealand | 15–9 | +1616 | 750 |
| 9 | Cook, Andrew | England | 15–9 | +983 | 400 |
| 10 | Holgate, John | Australia | 15–9 | +782 | 400 |
| 11 | Cappelletto, Brian | United States | 15–9 | +711 | 300 |
| 12 | Boyd, Kendall | New Zealand | 15–9 | +603 | 300 |
| 13 | Fernando, Naween Tharanga | Sri Lanka | 15–9 | +217 | 200 |
| 14 | Appleby, Phil | England | 15–9 | +191 | 200 |
| 15 | Sherman, Joel | United States | 15–9 | +73 | 200 |
| 16 | Chinnaiyah, Suresh | Sri Lanka | 14–10 | +910 | 200 |
| 17 | Wiegand, David | United States | 14–10 | +820 | |
| 18 | Klaphajone, Jakkrit | Thailand | 14–10 | +635 | |
| 19 | Quiballo, Virgilio | Philippines | 14–10 | +566 | |
| 20 | Luebkemann, John | United States | 14–10 | +309 | |
| 21 | Chunkath, Mohan Verghese | India | 14–10 | +292 | |
| 22 | Awowade, Femi | England | 14–10 | +203 | |
| 23 | Odom, Lisa | United States | 14–10 | +151 | |
| 24 | Ndungu, Stanley Njoroge | Kenya | 14–10 | +102 | |
| 25 | Epstein, Paul | United States | 14–10 | +88 | |
| 26 | Jackman, Bob | Australia | 13½–10½ | +166 | |
| 27 | Webb, David | England | 13–11 | +602 | |
| 28 | Edley, Joe | United States | 13–11 | +447 | |
| 29 | Credo, Ronald | Philippines | 13–11 | +439 | |
| 30 | Gongolo, Michael | Kenya | 13–11 | +255 | |
| 31 | Gruzd, Steven | South Africa | 13–11 | +222 | |
| 32 | Rosenthal, Joan | Australia | 13–11 | +214 | |
| 33 | Warner, Howard | New Zealand | 13–11 | +194 | |
| 34 | Williams, Gareth | Wales | 13–11 | +178 | |
| 35 | Hersom, Randy | United States | 13–11 | +106 | |
| 36 | Thobani, Shafique | Kenya | 13–11 | +14 | |
| 37 | Ploysangngam, Amnuay | Thailand | 13–11 | -16 | |
| 38 | Cherry, James | Canada | 13–11 | -27 | |
| 39 | Pra, Michael | Oman | 13–11 | -369 | |
| 40 | Nemitrmansuk, Pakorn | Thailand | 13–11 | -382 | |
| 41 | Grant, Jeff | New Zealand | 13–11 | -588 | |
| 42 | Chishty, Ishtiaq | Saudi Arabia | 12½–114½ | +399 | |
| 43 | Rio, Odette Carmina | Philippines | 12–12 | +569 | |
| 44 | Smitheram, Brett | England | 12–12 | +555 | |
| 45 | Felt, Robert | United States | 12–12 | +360 | |
| 46 | Geary, Jim | United States | 12–12 | +358 | |
| 47 | Filio, Roland | Philippines | 12–12 | +285 | |
| 48 | Schonbrun, Lester | United States | 12–12 | +100 | |
| 49 | Gipson, Helen | England | 12–12 | +37 | |
| 50 | Pui, Cheng Wui | Malaysia | 12–12 | +6 | |
| 51 | Jimoh, Saheed | Nigeria | 12–12 | -22 | |
| 52 | Bwire, Matayo | Kenya | 12–12 | -31 | |
| 53 | Hahn, Albert | Canada | 12–12 | -48 | |
| 54 | Bondin, Owen | Malta | 12–12 | -293 | |
| 55 | Asirvatham, Ganesh | Malaysia | 12–12 | -293 | |
| 56 | Warwick, Wilma | Scotland | 11½–12½ | -514 | |
| 57 | Bhandarkar, Akshay | Bahrain | 11½–12½ | +156 | |
| 58 | Cleary, Paul Stephen | Australia | 11½–12½ | +59 | |
| 59 | Sutthasin, Taewan | Thailand | 11½–12½ | -728 | |
| 60 | Sim, Tony | Singapore | 11–13 | +247 | |
| 61 | Early, Dylan | South Africa | 11–13 | +115 | |
| 62 | Gonzalez, Ricardo V | Gulf Champion | 11–13 | +112 | |
| 63 | Lipton, Bob | United States | 11–13 | -8 | |
| 64 | Polatnick, Steve | United States | 11–13 | -130 | |
| 65 | Tang, Michael | Malaysia | 11–13 | -172 | |
| 66 | Sinton, Peter | New Zealand | 11–13 | -197 | |
| 67 | Elbourne, Peter | Malta | 11–13 | -319 | |
| 68 | Abraham, Arvind | United Arab Emirates | 11–13 | -359 | |
| 69 | Khan, Rashid Ateeq | Pakistan | 11–13 | -427 | |
| 70 | Berlin, Barbara | Australia | 11–13 | -487 | |
| 71 | Gan, Cher Siong | Singapore | 11–13 | -726 | |
| 72 | Hirai, Keiichiro | Japan | 10½–13½ | +188 | |
| 73 | Hovelmeier, Trevor Mark | South Africa | 10–14 | +197 | |
| 74 | McDonnell, Brendan | Ireland | 10–14 | +75 | |
| 75 | Webb, Alice | England | 10–14 | -33 | |
| 76 | Lobo, Selwyn | United Arab Emirates | 10–14 | -83 | |
| 77 | Kong, Chock Heng | Malaysia | 10–14 | -210 | |
| 78 | Judd, Rodney | Pakistan | 10–14 | -366 | |
| 79 | Assesa, Dixon | Kenya | 10–14 | -398 | |
| 80 | Penaflor, Vivian | Bahrain | 10–14 | -476 | |
| 81 | Pray, Linda Hazel | Oman | 10–14 | -591 | |
| 82 | Kuroda, Kunihiko | Japan | 10–14 | -614 | |
| 83 | Eburu, Gold | Nigeria | 10–14 | -740 | |
| 84 | Usakiewicz, Wojciech | Poland | 10–14 | -876 | |
| 85 | Costello, Catherine | Ireland | 9½–14½ | -237 | |
| 86 | Charles, Leslie | Trinidad and Tobago | 9½–14½ | -603 | |
| 87 | Blom, Roger | Australia | 9–15 | +215 | |
| 88 | Metivier, Edward | Trinidad and Tobago | 9–15 | -164 | |
| 89 | Kane, Alistair | Australia | 9–15 | -353 | |
| 90 | Goh, Eugene | Singapore | 9–15 | -498 | |
| 91 | Sandu, Dan Laurentiu | Romania | 9–15 | -2008 | |
| 92 | Nanavati, Jim | Canada | 8–16 | +6 | |
| 93 | Fasuba, Johnson | Seychelles | 8–16 | -491 | |
| 94 | Wanniarachchi, Lakshan | Sri Lanka | 8–16 | -519 | |
| 95 | Michel, Antonin | France | 8–16 | -951 | |
| 96 | Silva, Dhanpala | Seychelles | 8–16 | -1187 | |
| 97 | Saliba, Mario | Malta | 7–17 | -868 | |
| 98 | Caba, Catalin-Eugen | Romania | 3–21 | -2991 | |

- Finals
- Game 1: Wapnick 624 – Nyman 307
- Game 2: Nyman 444 – Wapnick 330
- Game 3: Wapnick 462 – Nyman 339
- Game 4: Wapnick 403 – Nyman 402
