= Canadian National Scrabble Championship =

Scrabble competition in Canada

The Canadian National Scrabble Championship (CNSC) is the Canadian national Scrabble competition in the English language, open by invitation and special qualification only to the top rank of Canadian players. All CNSC events have been held in Toronto.

== History ==
In 1975 the Toronto Scrabble Club was registered and is now the oldest and largest club in North America. In 1996, Hasbro Canada recognized that Canadian players, who had already won the top American and World titles, needed an opportunity to test their mettle against each other. Hasbro asked Mike Wise, a founding member of the Toronto Scrabble Club, to organize and direct the first Canadian Championship.

The first CNSC was won by Adam Logan, then a 21-year-old mathematician and reigning American Champion, who defeated English literature specialist Peter Morris, 1991 World Champion, in the finals to become the first Canadian Champion.

The second CNSC was held in 1998 directed by John Chew. Joel Wapnick, a music professor at McGill and 1983 American Champion, defeated Albert Hahn, a truck driver from Calgary, in the finals. Wapnick went on to become World Champion in 1999, and is one of only two players (along with Adam Logan) to have won all three titles.

The third CNSC was held in 2000, again directed by John Chew. The finals matched 32-year-old expat accountant Ron Hoekstra of Michigan against 1996 champion Adam Logan, and Hoekstra surprised many observers by easily defeating Logan.

The fourth CNSC was held in 2003, directed by John Chew. The finals saw 1995 World Champion David Boys, a programmer analyst, win confidently against student Dean Saldanha by 3–1 (scores 465–304, 336–418, 402–291, 414–344).

The fifth CNSC was held in 2005, directed by John Chew. The finals saw maths lecturer and 2005 World Champion Adam Logan beat education coordinator Tony Leah by 3–1 (scores 475–278, 402–385, 405–407, 438–403).

The sixth CNSC was held in 2008, directed by John Chew. The finals saw two former World Champions (and Canadian Champions) Adam Logan and David Boys play a full five-game final. Logan became the first three-time Canadian champion defeating Boys 454–308, 448–383, 337–404, 342–464, and 492–354.

The seventh CNSC was held in 2011, directed by John Chew. The finals saw two former World Champions (and Canadian Champions) Adam Logan and Joel Wapnick play three final games, all won by Wapnick, 432–398, 501–312, and 423–394.

The eighth CNSC was held in 2013, directed by John Chew. In the finals, Adam Logan defeated computer analyst Ross Brown 401–274, 455–364, 438–381 to become the first person to win the title four times. The event demonstrated the growing strength of players from the Ottawa region, who comprised five of the top ten players, including both finalists.

The ninth CNSC was held in 2016, directed by John Chew. In the finals, Adam Logan defended his title by beating James Leong to become the first person to win the title five times.

The tenth CNSC was held in 2018, directed by John Chew. In the finals, Eric Tran, a law student from Calgary, narrowly prevailed over statistician John Stardom by 3–2 (scores 467–417, 227–509, 384–362, 361–523, 413–392). This year's event was the first where the finals did not feature a player who has won the World or North American championship.

== Results ==
Year	Winner	Runner up	Location	Winner's prize
2018	(Alberta) Eric Tran	(Ontario) John Stardom	Toronto	$7000
2016	(Ontario) Adam Logan (5)	(British Columbia) James Leong	Toronto	$7000
2013	(Ontario) Adam Logan (4)	(Ontario) Ross Brown	Toronto	$5000 (plus $2000 to winner's Canadian children's charity)
2011	(United States) Joel Wapnick (2)	(Ontario) Adam Logan	Toronto	$7000
2008	(Ontario) Adam Logan (3)	(Quebec) David Boys	Toronto	$7000
2005	(Ontario) Adam Logan (2)	(Ontario) Tony Leah	Toronto	$7000
2003	(Quebec) David Boys	(British Columbia) Dean Saldanha	Toronto	$8000
2000	(British Columbia) Ron Hoekstra	(Ontario) Adam Logan	Toronto	$7000
1998	(United States) Joel Wapnick	(Alberta) Albert Hahn	Toronto	$7000
1996	(Ontario) Adam Logan (1)	(United States) Peter Morris	Toronto	

== See also ==
- World Scrabble Championship
- World Youth Scrabble Championships
- Brand's Crossword Game King's Cup
- Scrabble Players Championship
- National School Scrabble Championship
