= Thomas Philipot =

English poet and writer (died 1682)

Thomas Philipot (died 1682) was an English poet and miscellaneous writer. The son of Somerset herald John Philipot, he proceeded M.A. at Clare Hall, Cambridge, regiis literis, in 1636, and was incorporated in that degree at Oxford in 1640. He published some poetical works and contributed to miscellanies.

== Life ==
Thomas Philipot, son of John Philipot, Somerset herald, by Susan, his wife, only daughter and heir of William Glover, was admitted a fellow-commoner of Clare Hall, Cambridge, on 10 February 1632–1633, and matriculated on 29 March 1633. He graduated M.A. regiis literis on 4 February 1635–6, and was incorporated in that degree at Oxford in July 1640. Wood says "he was, by those that well knew him, esteemed a tolerable poet when young, and at riper years well versed in matters of divinity, history, and antiquities". He was buried at Greenwich on 30 September 1682.

By his will, dated 11 September 1680, after devising certain premises to Clare Hall, Cambridge, for establishing two Kentish fellowships, he left his houses in the town of Eltham and a field (sold in 1866 to the commissioners of woods and forests for 650l.) to the Clothworkers' Company to establish six almshouses for four people from Eltham and two from Chislehurst, allowing them 5l. each a year.

== Works ==
Philipot published as his own in 1659 his father's Villare Cantianum. His genuine works are:

1. Elegies offer'd up to the Memory of William Glover, Esquire, late of Shalston in Buckinghamshire, London, 1641, 4to.
2. A congratulatory Elegie offered up to the Earle of Essex, upon his investiture with the dignitie of Lord Chamberlaine, London, 1641, 4to.
3. Poems, London, 1646, 8vo; dedicated to the Earl of Westmorland. In one copy the date is corrected in manuscript to 3 February 1645. (Brydges, Restituta, i. 232).
4. An Elegie offer'd unto the memory of his Excellencie Robert, Earle of Essex … late Generall of the Parliaments forces [London, 1646], small sheet, fol.
5. England's Sorrow for the losse of their late Generall, or an epitaph upon his Excellencie Robert, Earle of Essex, &c., who died Sept. 15, 1646; with a perfect memoriall of the particular services and battels that he himself was engaged in person, London, 1646, small sheet, fol.
6. An Historical Discourse of the First Invention of Navigation, and the Additional Improvements of it. With the probable Causes of the Variation of the Compasse, and the Variation of the Variation. Likewise some Reflections upon the Name and Office of Admirall. To which is added a Catalogue of those Persons that have been from the first Institution dignified with that Office, London, 1661, 4to; dedicated to Sir Francis Prujean, M.D.; reprinted in the Harleian Miscellany, vol. ii.
7. The Cripples Complaint, a sermon, 1662, 4to.
8. The Original and Growth of the Spanish Monarchy united with the House of Austria … to which are added several discourses of those accessions and improvements in Italy, Africk, with the East and West-Indies that are now annexed … to the Diadem of Spain, London, 1664, 8vo.
9. The English Life of Æsop, prefixed to Francis Barlow's edition of the Fables, London, 1666, fol.
10. Antiquitas Theologica et Gentilis, or two Discourses; the first concerning the Original of Churches, and their Direct or Collateral Endowments. The second touching the Religion of the Gentiles, their Temples, Priests, Sacrifices, and other Ancient Rituals, London, 1670, 12mo; dedicated to Sir Philip Warwick, Knt.
11. The Descent of King Stephen as extracted from that eminent family of the Earls of Blois and Champaigne; appended to Thomas Southouse's Monasticon Favershamiense, 1671.
12. A brief Historical Discourse of the Original and Growth of Heraldry, demonstrating upon what rational Foundations that Noble and Heroick Science is established, London, 1672, 8vo; dedicated to John, Earl of Bridgewater.
13. A Phylosophical Essay, treating of the most Probable Cause of that Grand Mystery of Nature, the Flux and Reflux: or, Flowing and Ebbing of the Sea, London, 1673, 4to; dedicated to Sir John Marsham, Bart.
14. Self-Homicide-Murther; or some Antidotes and Arguments gleaned out of the Treasuries of our Modern Casuists and Divines, against that Horrid and Reigning Sin of Self-Murther, London, 1674, 4to; dedicated to John Upton, Esq., of Newington Hall, Middlesex.

He contributed English verses to (α) Fisher's Marston Moor, 1650; (β) Cartwright's Comedies, 1651; (γ) Benlowes's Theophila, 1652; (δ) Boys's Æneas his Descent into Hell, 1661; (ε) Southouse's Monasticon Favershamiense, 1671.

== Sources ==
- Hasted, Edward (1886). Drake, Henry H. (ed.). Hasted's History of Kent, Corrected, Enlarged, and Continued to the Present Time. Vol. 1. London: Mitchell And Hughes. pp. 118, 197, 199, 283.
- McLellan, Ian William (2004). "Philipot, Thomas (d. 1682), poet and writer". Oxford Dictionary of National Biography (online ed.). Oxford University Press. doi:10.1093/ref:odnb/22109. (Subscription or UK public library membership required.)
- Wood, Anthony A. (1815). Bliss, Philip (ed.). Athenæ Oxonienses. New ed. Vol. 2. London: F. C. and J. Rivington, et al. p. 518.

Attribution:

- This article incorporates text from a publication now in the public domain: Cooper, Thompson (1896). "Philipot, Thomas". In Lee, Sidney (ed.). Dictionary of National Biography. Vol. 45. London: Smith, Elder & Co. pp. 163–164.
