= John Boys =

John Boys may refer to:

== Politicians ==
- John Boys (fl. 1388), MP for Plympton Erle (UK Parliament constituency)
- John Boys (died 1447), MP for Middlesex (UK Parliament constituency) and Hampshire
- John Boys (died 1612), MP for Canterbury, Sandwich and Midhurst
- John Boys (died 1533), MP for Sandwich (UK Parliament constituency)
- John Boys (Parliamentarian) (c. 1607–1678), MP for Kent

== Religion ==
- John Boys (priest) (1571–1625), Dean of Canterbury, 1619–1625
- John Boys (bishop) (1897–1965), Bishop of Kimberley and Kuruman, 1951–1960

== Translators ==
- John Bois (1560–1643), also spelt John Boys, English translator
- John Boys (classicist) (1614?–1661), English translator of Virgil

== Others ==
- John Boys (Royalist) (1607–1664), military commander
- John Boys (agriculturalist) (1749–1824), agriculturist
- John Boys (cricketer) (1856–1883), English cricketer

== See also ==
- John Boyes (disambiguation)
- John Boy and Billy
