= John Boyes =

John Boyes may refer to:

- John H. Boyes (1886–1958), New Zealand Public Service Commissioner
- John Boyes (musician) (born 1966), English progressive rock guitarist and photographer
- John Frederick Boyes (1811–1879), English classical scholar

== See also ==
- John Boys (disambiguation)
