= Samuel Woodford =

English poet (1636 – 1700)

The Reverend Samuel Woodford FRS
- Canon of Chichester and Winchester
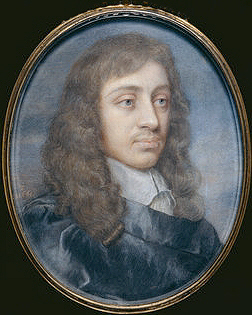
- Thomas Flatman, Samuel Woodforde DD (1661)
- Province: Canterbury
- Diocese: Chichester; Winchester

Orders
- Ordination: January 1669

Personal details
- Born: 15 April 1636 All Hallows in the Wall, London
- Died: 11 January 1700 (aged 63) Winchester, Hampshire
- Denomination: Anglican
- Spouse: Unknown (m.)
- Children: William Woodford
- Education: Wadham College, Oxford

Samuel Woodford, FRS (1636 – 1700) was an Anglican divine and poet.

== Life ==
Samuel Woodford, born on 15 April 1636 in the parish of All Hallows in the Wall, London, was the eldest son of Robert Woodford of Northampton by his wife Jane Dexter. After leaving St. Paul's School he matriculated on 20 July 1654 as a commoner at Wadham College, Oxford, whence he graduated BA on 6 February 1657 (NS). Two years later he entered as a student at the Inner Temple, where his chamber-fellow was Thomas Flatman, the poet. He afterwards lived, first at Aldbrook, then at Binstead, near Ryde, "in a married and secular condition". In November 1664 he was elected to the Royal Society. In January 1669 he took holy orders, and in 1673 was presented by Sir Nicholas Stuart to the benefice of Hartley-Mauduit, Hampshire. Through the influence of George Morley, Bishop of Winchester, he was appointed Canon of Chichester on 27 May 1676, and of Winchester on 8 November 1680. He received the degree of D.D. by diploma of Archbishop Sancroft in 1677. He died at Winchester on 11 January 1700.

Samuel married after the Restoration, and had several sons, of whom the youngest, William Woodford (died 1758), was fellow of New College from 1699 to 1712, censor of the Royal College of Physicians in 1773, and Regius Professor of Medicine at Oxford from 1730 till his death.

== Works ==
Woodford began his poetical career by contributing in 1658 to the Naps upon Parnassus of the younger Samuel Austin (fl. 1658). Of his poem On the Return of Charles II, 1660, Wood had seen no copy. His chief works were The Paraphrase upon the Psalms and The Paraphrase upon the Canticles. The first originally appeared in quarto in 1667, with a dedication to Bishop Morley, and was reissued in octavo in 1678. In a lengthy preface the reader is informed that the Paraphrase was written while Woodford "had the convenience of a private and most delightful retirement" in the company of Mrs. Mary Beale and her husband. He had been forewarned against prolixity "by a very judicious friend, Mr. Thomas Sprat" (afterwards the bishop). The object of the poet, who drew his inspiration from Cowley, was to give as nearly as he could "the true sense and meaning of the psalms, and in as easy and obvious terms as was possible". The result may be pronounced successful from a literary point of view; and the Paraphrase won the praise of Baxter in his preface to Poetical Fragments, 1681.

In 1679 appeared his Paraphrase upon the Canticles and some select Hymns of the New and Old Testaments, with other Occasional Compositions in English Rimes. The volume, which is dedicated to Archbishop Sancroft, has prefatory verses by Sir Nicholas Stuart and Thomas Flatman, besides an ode by W. Croune, D.D.

Woodford's miscellaneous poems include two odes to Izaak Walton and verses in commendation of Denham's New Version of the Psalms of David. An edition of Woodford's complete works published in 1713 is described as "the second edition corrected by the author". A manuscript Ode to the Memory of John, Lord Wilmot, Earl of Rochester, is among the Rawlinson collections in the Bodleian, to which library Woodford in March 1657 presented a map of Rome. Valentin Parisot, writing a century later, thought his poems had fallen into undeserved oblivion.
