= William Boys =

William Boys may refer to:

- William Boys (MP) (1541–1596), English politician, member of parliament for Queenborough
- William Boys (surgeon) (1735–1803), English surgeon and topographer
- William Alves Boys (1868–1938), Canadian politician and barrister
- William Boys (Royal Navy officer) (1700–1774)
- William Boys, one of the Members of the Tasmanian House of Assembly, 1856–1861
