= Wapnick =

Wapnick is a surname. Notable people with the surname include:

- Joel Wapnick (born 1946), Canadian professional Scrabble player
- Steve Wapnick (born 1965), American baseball player
