= William Boys (surgeon) =

English surgeon and topographer

William Boys (1735–1803) was an English surgeon and topographer.

== Life ==
Boys was born at Deal on 7 Sept. 1735. He was of an old Kent family (Hasted, History of Kent, iii. 109), being the eldest son of Commodore William Boys, R.N., lieutenant-governor of Greenwich Hospital (c.1700–1774), by his wife, Elizabeth Pearson of Deal (Gent. Mag. lxxiii. pt. i. 421-3). About 1755 he was a surgeon at Sandwich, Kent, where he was noted for his untiring explorations of Richborough Castle, for skill in deciphering ancient manuscripts and inscriptions, for his zeal in collecting antiquities connected with Sandwich, and for his studies in astronomy, natural history, and mathematics. In 1759 he married Elizabeth Wise, a daughter of Henry Wise, one of the Sandwich jurats (ibid.), and by her he had two children. In 1761 he was elected jurat, acting with his wife's father. In the same year, 1761, she died, and in the next year, 1762, he married Jane Fuller, coheiress of her uncle, one John Paramor of Statenborough (ibid.) In 1767 Boys was mayor of Sandwich. In 1774 his father died at Greenwich (Nichols, Lit. Anecd. ix. 24 n.)

In 1782 he again served as mayor. In 1783 his second wife died, having borne him eight or nine children (ib., and Hasted, Hist. of Kent, iv. 222 n.) In 1796 he gave up his Sandwich practice and went to reside at Walmer, but returned to Sandwich at the end of three years, in 1799. His health had now declined. He had apoplectic attacks in 1799, and died of apoplexy on 15 March 1803, aged 68.

Boys was buried in St. Clement's Church, Sandwich, where there is a Latin epitaph to his memory, a suggestion for a monument with some doggerel verses, from a correspondent to the Gentleman's Magazine (lxxiii. pt. ii. 612), having fallen through. He was a member of the Linnean Society, and a contributor to the Gentleman's Magazine (Index, vol. iii. preface, p. lxxiv). A tern found by him at Sandwich was named Sterna boysii, after him, by John Latham in his Index Ornithologicus.

== Works ==
His first publication in 1775 protested against a scheme for draining a large tract of the neighbouring land, which it was thought would destroy Sandwich harbour. Boys drew it up as one of the commissioners of sewers, on behalf of the corporation, and it was published at Canterbury in 1775 anonymously (Gent. Mag. lxxiii. pt. i. 421-3).

In 1776 Boys was elected a Fellow of the Society of Antiquaries (F.S.A., London). In 1783 Boys furnished the Rev. John Duncombe with much matter relating to Reculver, printed in Duncombe's Antiquities of Reculver. In 1784 was published Testacea Minuta Rariora, 4to, being plates and description of the tiny shells found on the seashore near Sandwich, by Boys, "that inquisitive naturalist" (Introd. p. i). The book was put together by George Walker, Boys himself being too much occupied by his profession. In 1786 Boys issued proposals for publishing his Collections for a History of Sandwich at a price which should only cover its expenses, and placed his materials in the hands of the printers (Nichols, Lit. Ill. vi. 613).

In 1787 Boys published an account of the survivors of the Luxborough Galley, a case of cannibalism, in which his father (Commodore Boys) had been one of the men compelled to resort to this horrible means of preserving life. Boys had a series of pictures hung up in his parlour portraying the whole of the terrible circumstances (Pennant, in his Journey from London to the Isle of Wight). Of this Account, as a separate publication, there is now no trace; but it appears in full in a history of Greenwich Hospital; six small paintings that were in the council room of the hospital (presumably replicas of those seen by Pennant in the possession of William Boys) represent this passage, they are now held in the hospital's collection at the National Maritime Museum,

In 1788 appeared the first part of Sandwich, and in 1789 Boys was appointed surgeon to the sick and wounded seamen at Deal. Over the second part of Sandwich there was considerable delay and anxiety (Letter from Denne, Nichols's Lit. Ill. vi. 613); but in 1792 the volume was issued at much pecuniary loss to Boys. In 1792 Boys also sent Dr. Simmons some Observations on Kit's Coity House, which were read at the Society of Antiquaries, and appeared in vol. xi. of Archæologia.
