= Edward Boys =

Edward Boys may refer to:

- Sir Edward Boys (MP) (1579–1646), MP for Fowey, Christchurch, Sandwich and Dover
- Edward Boys (Royal Navy officer) (1785–1866), English sea captain
- Edward James Boys (1916–2002), English military author
- Edward Boys (priest) (1599–1667), English divine and author of sermons
- Edward's Boys, a youth theatre group run by Perry Mills

== See also ==
- Edward Boyse (1923–2007), British-born, American physician and biologist
