= Luxborough Galley =

English ship

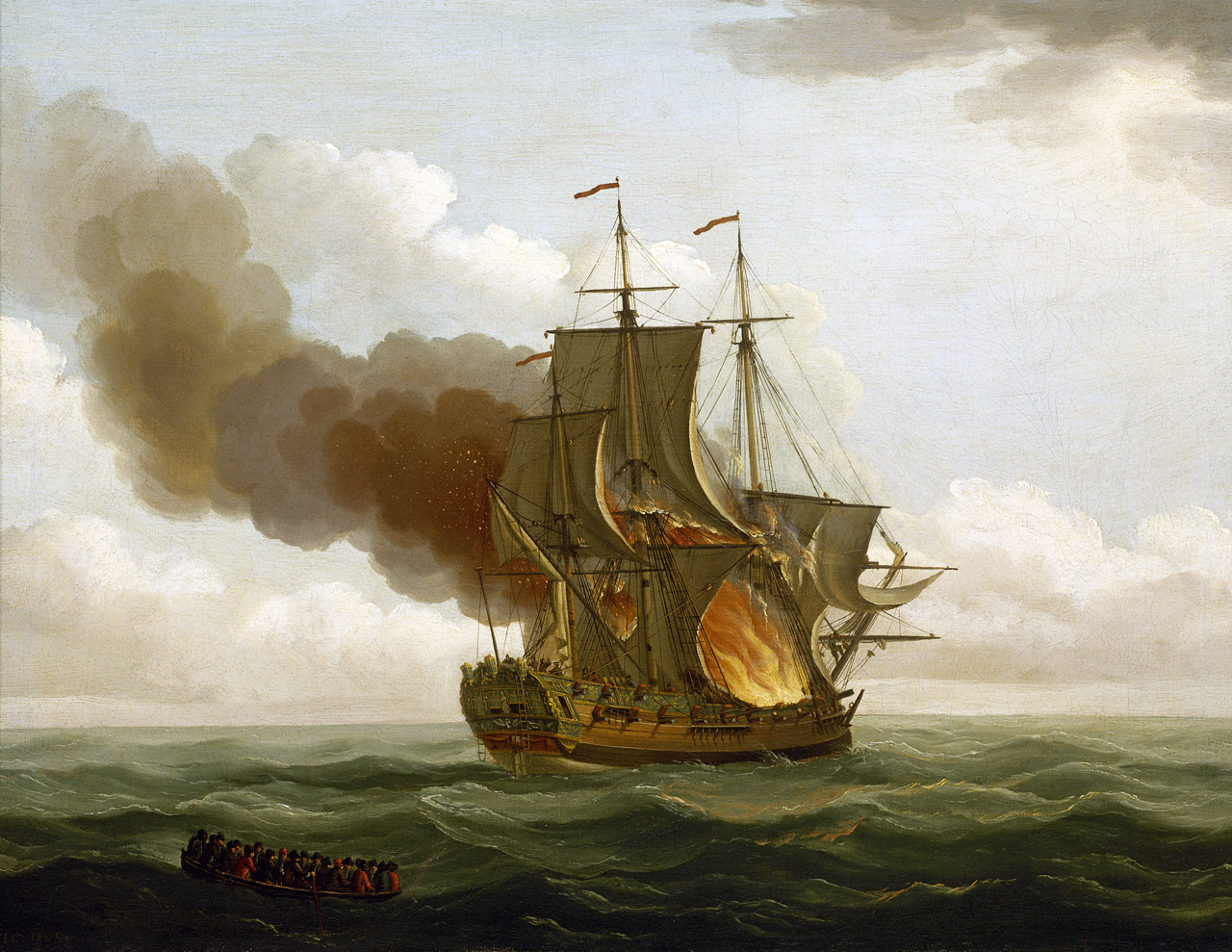
The Luxborough Galley on fire

The Luxborough Galley was an English slave ship owned by the South Sea Company which in 1727 burnt, exploded and sank in the Atlantic Ocean, returning from a slave-trading expedition. Twelve of the crew survived due to practicing cannibalism aboard the lifeboat.

== Last voyage ==
The vessel, commanded by William Kellaway, had a burthen 340 tons and was fitted to carry 26 guns. She was employed by the South Sea Company in a triangular trade route, transporting cotton goods, slaves and rum between Europe, Africa and the Americas. The delivery of slaves to the Spanish colonies in the Americas was made under the conditions stipulated in the Asiento contract.

The disastrous journey had seen one third of the human cargo, 600 African slaves, die from smallpox before they were delivered. Having left England in October 1725, her end came in the mid-Atlantic on 25 June 1727; she caught fire while carrying rum and sugar on the return leg to England and sank. The testimony of William Boys is often referred to in later notices; he was a 24-year-old second mate on the voyage, having already served with the Royal Navy for ten years.

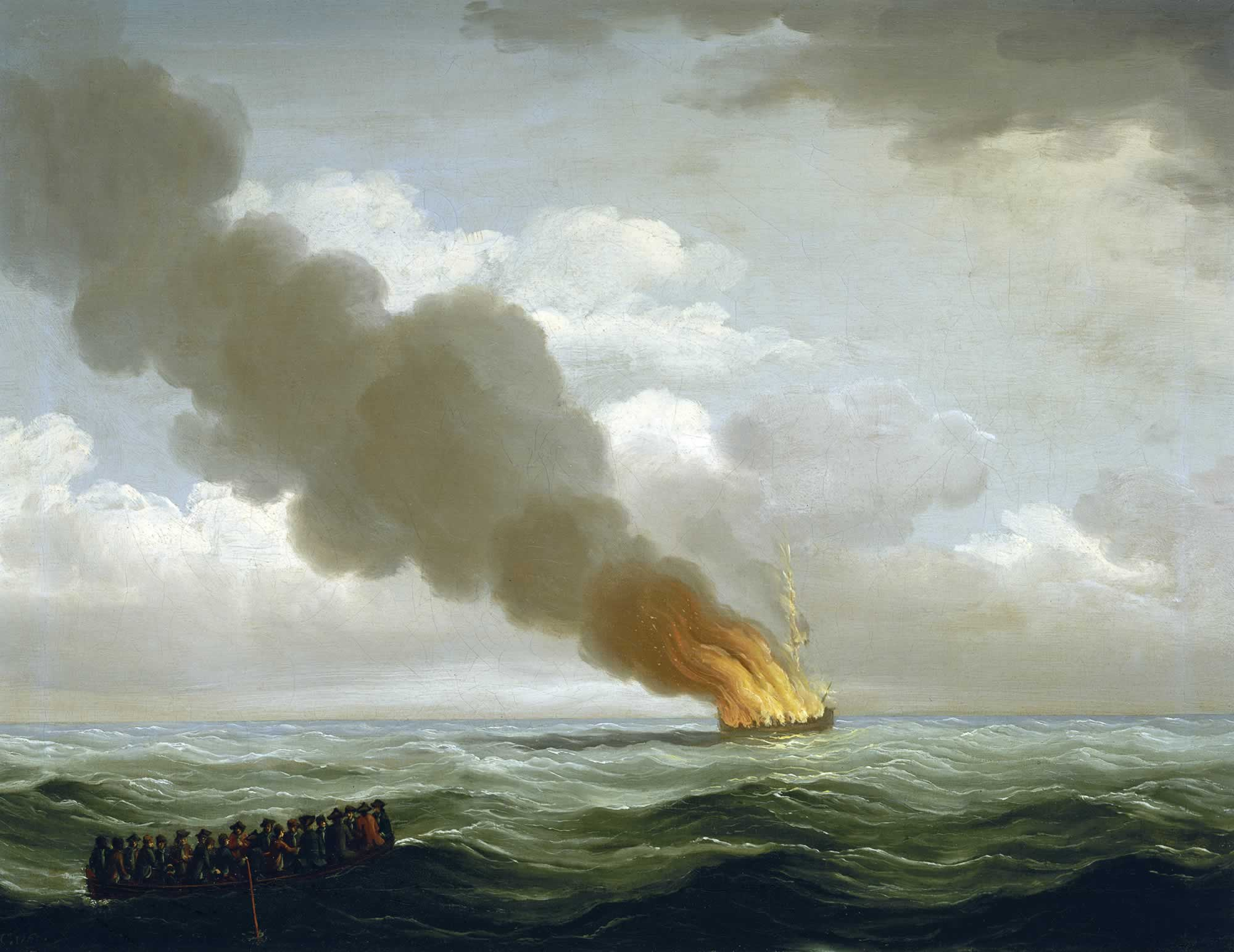
Fire on the slave ship, lost in the last leg of the triangular trade between the Caribbean and Britain

The vessel left Jamaica on 23 June, being destined for England on the final leg of the journey. Her position two days later was determined to be latitude 41° 45' north, longitude 20° 30 east, from Crooked Island, Bahamas when the final disaster struck. The cause was reported as resulting from the actions of two youths, described as "black boys", who were in the hold of the ship when they noticed liquid on the floor. Fearing this was water leaking from a keg, they held a candle to it to investigate; the substance turned out to be rum and it quickly caught fire.

The two boys then hid themselves, afraid of the consequences of their actions. At half past twelve the captain's cook noticed flames emerging from the forecastle, as he raised the alarm a keg exploded and filled the hold with flames. Several members of the crew attempted to quench the fire with water, even stripping their clothing to smother the flames, but the hold had become an inferno. The deck overhead was breached in an attempt to douse the flames, this allowed air to enter, increasing the intensity of the fire, and the front of the ship was soon ablaze.

During the conflagration the panic-stricken captain and some crew had fallen to their knees and prayed, expecting at any moment that the gunpowder below the fire would explode; others sought to escape on a yawl that had been hurriedly launched. The sixteen foot boat contained three oars, its fourth was lost, but held no other equipment or provisions. The Luxborough Galley was equipped with a longboat, but despite the efforts of some of the crew, it could not be launched, most likely because the tackle had caught fire.

The smaller boat was filled beyond its regular capacity, 22 men and boys; when this was under-way there were sixteen persons left behind. The yawl was turned into the waves to avoid swamping, putting distance between any salvage or survivors. The huddled occupants watched the Luxborough continue to burn to the waterline and eventually explode.

== Survivors ==
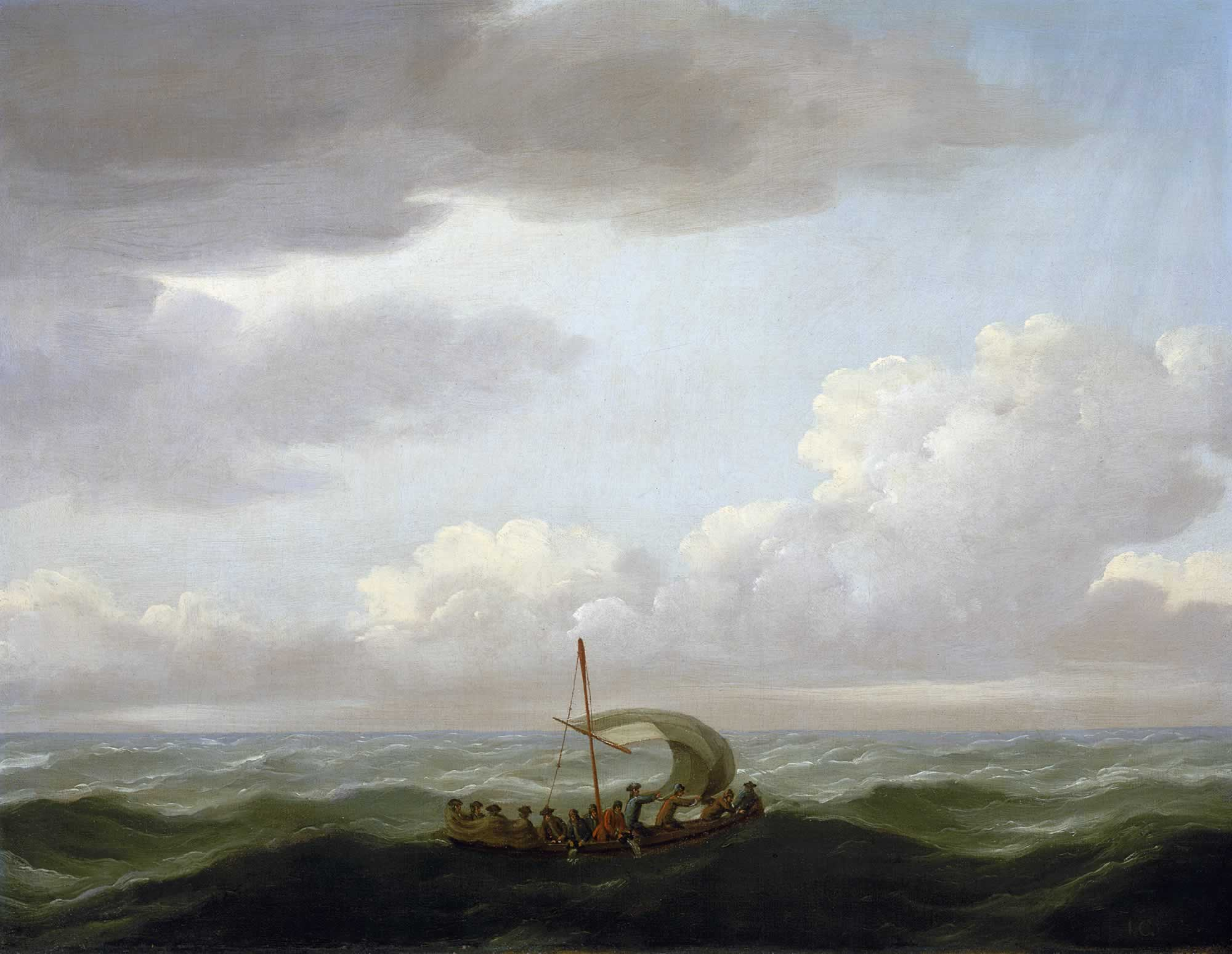
The survivors, with improvised sail, in the mid-Atlantic. Cleveley, c. 1727.

The escape on the boat left those fleeing in a precarious situation, with no food or water, no compass, and ill-prepared for an ocean voyage to safety. Some of those on board the yawl, decrying their predicament, proposed to relieve their craft's burden by casting the alleged instigators of the blaze, the two boys, into the ocean. This was overruled, and the captain vetoed a proposal to settle the matters by allotment. The later deaths of some occupants made this unnecessary.

The Luxborough's crew were adrift for two weeks, and their number was reduced to twelve before their rescue by fishermen off the coast of Newfoundland. The captain died the next day. They were tended to by their rescuers before setting out for a major port. Only five men reached this destination; one man went to New England and the rest reached London on 14 October. Of the few survivors, William Boys survived to the age of 74; the surgeon, Scrimsour, to 80; and George Mould died at Greenwich Hospital aged 82.

The gruesome details of the survivors of the Luxborough Galley appeared in notices in newspapers. In September, the Evening Post and others reprinted the ghoulish report of the Boston Gazette. An account of the incident was the subject of a 1787 book by William Boys, the son of one survivor, Commodore William Boys, R.N. (c. 1700–1774), who had risen through the ranks to become lieutenant-governor of Greenwich Hospital.

The Penny Magazine of 1834 reproduced part of Boys' narrative, comparing it to the later disaster of the sinking of Royal George. The narrative detailed the journey leading up to the sinking, and the means by which they navigated, improvised a sail, and obtained a meagre amount of water. The frank account of the fifth day of the voyage gave the recipe for their continued survival,

The sensation of hunger was not so urgent, but we all saw the necessity of recruiting our bodies with some more substantial nourishment, and it was at this time we found ourselves impelled to adopt the horrible expedient of eating part of the bodies of our dead companions, and drinking their blood. Our surgeon, Mr. Scrimsour, a man of the utmost humanity, first suggested the idea, and, resolute to set us an example, ate the first morsel himself; but, at the second mouthful, turned his face away from as many as he could and wept. With great reluctance we brought ourselves to try different parts of the bodies of six, but could relish only the hearts, of which we ate three. We drank the blood of four. By cutting the throat a little while after death, we collected a little more than a pint from each body. Here I cannot but mention the particular respect shown by the men to the officers, for the men who were employed in the melancholy business of collecting the blood in a pewter bason that was in the boat, and the rest of the people, would never touch a drop till the captain, surgeon, and myself had taken as much as we thought proper. And I can truly affirm, we were so affected by this strong instance of their regard that we always left them a larger share than of right belonged to them. This expedient, so shocking in relation, and so distressing to us in the use, was undoubtedly the means of preserving those who survived, as we constantly found ourselves refreshed and invigorated by this nourishment, however unnatural.

We often saw birds flying over our heads, and fish playing round the boat's stern, which we strove to catch with our hat-bands knotted together, and a pin for a hook, baited with a piece of the dead men's bodies; but with all our contrivance could not catch either fish or bird.

John Nichols mentions Boys' work in his Literary Anecdotes, and ends his retelling of the events by remarking on the "very great age" of the few survivors. A series of paintings detailing the events was displayed by the younger Boys in his parlour, according to Thomas Pennant.

Another series of small paintings, attributed to John Cleveley the Elder in 1727, are assumed to be reproductions of the same; these were acquired by the Greenwich Hospital and are now part of their collection held at the National Maritime Museum. A history of the hospital reproduces the rarer published account by the younger Boys.
