= Edward Benlowes =

English poet (1603–1676)

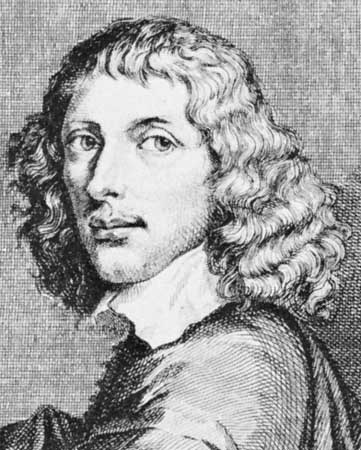
- Born: 12 July 1603
- Died: 18 December 1676 (aged 73)
- Education: St John's College, Cambridge
- Writing career
- Genre: Poetry

Edward Benlowes (12 July 1603 – 18 December 1676) was an English poet.

== Life ==
The son of Andrew Benlowes of Brent Hall, Essex, he matriculated at St John's College, Cambridge, on 8 April 1620.

On leaving the university he travelled with a tutor on the continent, visiting seven courts of princes. Wood says that he returned tinged with Romanism; but according to Cole he had been bred in the Roman Catholic religion from his earliest years. In later life he converted to Protestantism. On the death of his father he became possessed of the estate of Brent Hall, but being a man of a very liberal disposition he contrived "to squander it mostly away on poets, flatterers (which he loved), in buying of curiosities (which some called baubles), on musicians, buffoons, &c." (Wood). He often gave his bond for the payment of debts contracted by his friends, and on one occasion, being unable to meet the obligation he had incurred, was committed to prison at Oxford. To his niece at her marriage, he granted a handsome portion, and many poor scholars experienced his bounty. When he left Cambridge he made a valuable donation of books to St. John's College. Among his friends, he numbered many distinguished men. In 1633, Phineas Fletcher dedicated to him The Purple Island. Sir William Davenant, Francis Quarles, Payne Fisher, and others, dedicated works to him or complimented him in epigrams.

Benlowes spent the last eight years of his life at Oxford, studying much in the Bodleian Library, and enjoying "conversation with ingenious." He died, in great poverty, after he marched off in a cold season, on 18 December 1676, at eight o'clock at night.

== Works ==
Benlowes' chief work is entitled Theophila, or Love's Sacrifice, a divine poem. Written by E. B. Esq. Several parts thereof set to fit aires, by Mr. J. Jenkins, 1652, fol. It deals with mystical religion, telling how the soul, represented by Theophila, ascends by humility, zeal and contemplation, and triumphs over the sins of the senses. The poem is divided into thirteen cantos, most of which are preceded by large plates of Hollar and others. Prefixed to the first canto, which is entitled the Prelibation to the Sacrifice, is an engraving of a full-length figure (presumably the author) seated at a writing-table. The volume is greatly valued for the engravings. Later writers, including Samuel Butler, Alexander Pope and William Warburton, were exceedingly severe on Benlowes's poetry.
