= Samuel Austin the younger =

Samuel Austin, the younger (died ca. 1665) was an English poetical writer.

== Education ==
Austin became a commoner of Wadham College, Oxford in 1652 and took his BA degree in 1656. Afterwards, he migrated to Cambridge.

At Oxford, he had gained a reputation for self-conceit. A contemporary remarked:

Such was the vanity of this person that he, being extremely conceited of his own worth, and overvaluing his poetical fancy more than that of Cleveland, who was then accounted the "hectoring prince of poets"...

== Works ==
Pieces of Austin's verse and prose were published in 1658 under the title of Naps upon Parnassus; a sleepy Muse nipt and pincht, though not awakened, including contributions by:

- Thomas Flatman, fellow of New College;
- Thomas Sprat, of Wadham College, afterwards bishop of Rochester;
- George Castle, of All Souls College;
- Alexander Amidci, a Jewish teacher of Hebrew at Oxford;
- Sylvanus Taylour of All Souls College.

At the restoration of Charles II, Austin published another work Panegyrick (1661).

What became of Austin after the publication of the 'Panegyrick' is not known.
