= World Scrabble Championship 1995 =

- 2 November 1995 – 5 November 1995
- Winner: David Boys (Scrabble)|David Boys
- Number of players: 64
- Location: London
- Sponsor: Mattel

The World Scrabble Championship 1995 was the third World Scrabble Championship. The winner was David Boys of Canada.

A fifteen-round, Swiss-paired preliminary event was used to determine initial placement. The top four players then played a three-game round-robin (with the results of the first 15 games carrying over) to determine the finalists, who played a best-of-five final.

The first game of the finals was a close one with Sherman winning 431–421. Sherman missed a bingo (pENTROOF) but at that point, the game was already in the bag.

In the second game, many felt that Sherman blundered in his opening play while Boys cruised to an easy 404–278 victory despite missing ABOmASA early on.

Sherman and Boys traded wins again in games three and four, setting up a single game to decide the championship.

The final game was a bit of an anti-climax with Boys winning easily 432–300 (after challenging off Sherman's early phony TWINNERS) to take the World Championship. With two tiles in the bag, Boys chose to bypass a 98-point bingo (LADYBUGS) to block a triple-triple line that Sherman had a 1-in-18 chance of using for the game-winning 212-point PEJORATE. The blocking play left Sherman with no chance to win and left Boys as World Champion.

== Complete results ==
Position	Name	Country	Win–loss	Spread	Prize (USD)
1	Boys, David	Canada	17–6	+1154	11,000
2	Sherman, Joel	United States	17–6	+679	8,000
3	Grant, Jeff	New Zealand	12–7	+453	3,500
4	Lipton, Bob	United States	11–8	+645	2,000
5	Edley, Joe	United States	12–6	+668	950
6	Gruzd, Steven	South Africa	12–6	+422	800
7	Thobani, Shafique	Kenya	12–6	+381	650
8	Logan, Adam	Canada	10–8	+149	550
9	Saldanha, Allan	United Kingdom	12–6	+389	450
10	Nderitu, Patrick Gitonga	Kenya	11–7	+734	350
11	Cappelletto, Brian	United States	11–7	+477	300
12	Appleby, Phil	England	9–9	+193	250
13	Onyeonwu, Ifeanyi	Nigeria	12–6	+701	225
14	Daniel, Robin Pollock	Canada	11–7	+484	200
15	Wapnick, Joel	Canada	10–8	+264	175
16	Felt, Robert	United States	9–9	-35	150
17	Nyman, Mark	World Champion	11–7	+256	
18	Rosenthal, Joan	Australia	11–7	-206	
19	Sigley, Michael	New Zealand	10–8	+11	
20	Fisher, Andrew	United Kingdom	10–8	-92	
21	Warusawitharana, Missaka	Sri Lanka	10–8	+705	
22	Okosagah, Sammy	Nigeria	10–8	+451	
23	Fernando, Naween Tharanga	Sri Lanka	10–8	-500	
24	Scott, Neil	Scotland	9–9	+426	
25	Simmons, Allan	England	10–8	+377	
26	Bhandarkar, Akshay	Bahrain	10–8	+48	
27	Addo, Joshua	Ghana	9–9	+117	
28	Placca, Chrys	Ghana	9–9	-155	
29	Sim, Tony	Singapore	10–8	+94	
30	Byers, Russell	England	10–8	-114	
31	Tan, Teong-Chuan	Malaysia	9–9	-146	
32	Elbourne, Peter	Malta	9–9	-266	
33	Willis, Mike	England	10–8	+367	
34	Williams, Gareth	Wales	9–9	+444	
35	Widergren, Jeff	United States	8–10	+294	
36	Blom, Roger	Australia	7–11	+112	
37	Jackman, Bob	Australia	9–9	+272	
38	Polatnick, Steve	United States	9–9	+238	
39	Khoshnaw, Karl	Kurdistan-Iraq	9–9	+133	
40	Orbaum, Sam	Israel	7–11	-301	
41	Awowade, Femi	England	9–9	-168	
42	Avrin, Paul	United States	9–9	-334	
43	Thorogood, Blue	New Zealand	8–10	-69	
44	Norr, Rita	United States	8–10	-110	
45	Leader, Zelig	Israel	9–9	-325	
46	Spate, Clive	United Kingdom	8–10	+102	
47	Nevarez, Johnny	United States	7–11	+55	
48	Paolella, Libero	Canada	7–11	+25	
49	Holgate, John	Australia	8–10	-69	
50	Hale, Glennis	New Zealand	8–10	-131	
51	Lao, Armando	Philippines	8–10	-247	
52	Siddiqui, Anwar	Pakistan	6–12	-255	
53	Lobo, Selwyn	United Arab Emirates	8–10	-5	
54	Romany, Rodney	Trinidad and Tobago	7–11	-349	
55	Hossy, Debbe	South Africa	7–11	-659	
56	Springer, Robert	France	6–12	-979	
57	Arreola, Pepito	Saudi Arabia	7–11	-503	
58	Harrison, Trevor	United Kingdom	7–11	-549	
59	Kuroda, Kunihiko	Japan	6–12	-1026	
60	Samarasundera, Wimal	Oman	6–12	-1405	
61	Perez, Gerardo	Kuwait	6–12	-545	
62	Holmes, Michael	Seychelles	6–12	-1044	
63	Yeh, Winnie	Hong Kong	5–13	-923	
64	Broderick, Chris	Ireland	3–15	-810	

- FINALS:
- Game 1: Sherman 431 – Boys 421
- Game 2: Boys 404 – Sherman 278
- Game 3: Sherman 443 – Boys 398
- Game 4: Boys 495 – Sherman 393
- Game 5: Boys 432 – Sherman 300
