= John Boys (cricketer) =

English cricketer

Personal information
- Full name: John James Boys
- Born: 17 August 1856; Titchfield, Hampshire
- Died: 1 August 1883 (aged 26); Woolwich, Kent
- Batting: Right-handed
- Bowling: Right-arm roundarm fast
- Role: Wicket-keeper

Domestic team information
- Years: Team
- 1875–1881: Kent

Career statistics
Competition	First-class
Matches	3
Runs scored	34
Batting average	6.80
100s/50s	0/0
Top score	21
Catches/stumpings	4/2
- Source: CricInfo, 27 June 2014

John James Boys (17 August 1856 – 1 August 1883) was an English cricketer active in first-class cricket in the mid-1870s and early 1880s. Born at Titchfield, Hampshire, Boys was a right-handed batsman who played as a wicket-keeper.

Boys entered the British Army at the age of fifteen with the Royal Artillery based at Woolwich, where he was a musician with the Royal Artillery Band. He played cricket with some success for the Royal Artillery Cricket Club and was asked to play for Kent County Cricket Club many times but was unable to get leave of absence to do so. He did, however, make his debut in first-class cricket for Kent in 1875 against Hampshire. He later made two further first-class appearances for Kent in 1881 against the Marylebone Cricket Club and Surrey. Boys scored 34 runs in his four matches, as well as taking four catches and making two stumpings.

Boys died suddenly aged 26 at Woolwich on 1 August 1883 on the day of his planned wedding to his fiancée.

== Bibliography ==
- Carlaw, Derek (2020). Kent County Cricketers, A to Z: Part One (1806–1914) (PDF). Cardiff: ACS.
