= John Frederick Boyes =

British classical scholar (1811–1879)

John Frederick Boyes (10 February 1811 – 26 May 1879) was an English scholar of classics.

Boyes grew up in Charterhouse Square and entered Merchant Taylors' School in the Northwood area of London in 1819. After a very creditable school career extending over nearly ten years, he studied law at St John's College, Oxford. He graduated BA in 1833, taking a second class in classics, his papers on history and poetry being of marked excellence.

After graduation, he was appointed second master of a school in Walthamstow and eventually succeeded to the head-mastership, which he filled for many years. At Oxford (where he was summoned to act as examiner in 1842), and among a large circle of discriminating friends, he enjoyed a high reputation for culture and scholarship. Archdeacon James Hessey said of him that "There was not an English or Latin or Greek poet with whom he was not familiar, and from whom he could not make the most apposite quotations. With the best prose authors in our own and in French, and indeed other continental literature, he was thoroughly acquainted."

The closing years of his life were largely devoted to charity and he died at Maida Hill, London.

== Writings ==
- Illustrations of the Tragedies of Æschylus and Sophocles, from the Greek, Latin, and English Poets, 1844.
- English Repetitions, in Prose and Verse, with introductory remarks on the cultivation of taste in the young 1849.
- Life and Books, a Record of Thought and Reading, 1859.
- Lacon in Council, 1865. The two latter works remind one very much in their style and texture of 'Guesses at Truth,' by the brothers Hare.
