= John Boys (classicist) =

English translator of Virgil

John Boys (c. 1614 – c. 1661) was an English translator of Virgil.

== Life ==
John Boys was the son of John Boys (born 1590) of Hoad Court, Blean, Kent, and nephew of Edward Boys, 1599–1677. His mother was Mary, daughter of Martin Fotherby, bishop of Salisbury. He was born about 1614. His grandfather, Thomas Boys (died 1625), brother of the dean, John Boys, inherited the estate of Hoad Court from his uncle, Sir John Boys, an eminent lawyer, who died without issue in 1612. On 24 January 1659-1660, Boys presented to the mayor of Canterbury a declaration in favour of the assembly of a free parliament, drawn up by himself in behalf (as he asserted) "of the nobility, gentry, ministry, and commonalty of the county of Kent". But the declaration gave offence to the magistrates, and the author, as he explained in his Vindication of the Kentish Declaration, only escaped imprisonment by retiring to a hiding-place. Several of his friends were less successful. In February 1659-60 he went to London with his kinsman, Sir John Boys of Bonnington, and presented to Monk, at Whitehall, a letter of thanks, drawn up by himself 'according to the order and advice of the gentlemen of East Kent.' He also prepared a speech for delivery to Charles II on his landing at Dover on 25 May 1660; but "he was prevented therein by reason [H]is [M]ajesty made no stay at all in that town," and he therefore sent Charles a copy of it.

Boys married Anne, daughter of Dr. William Kingsley, archdeacon of Canterbury, by whom he had three sons—Thomas, who died without issue; John, a colonel in the army, who died 4 September 1710; and Sir William Boys, M.D., who is stated to have died in 1744. Boys himself died in 1660 or 1661, and was buried in the chancel of the church of Hoad.

== Works ==
Boys chiefly prided himself on his classical attainments. In 1661 he published two translations from Virgil's Æneid. The first is entitled, Æneas, his Descent into Hell: as it is inimitably described by the Prince of Poets in the Sixth of his Æneis, London, 1661. The dedication is addressed to Sir Edward Hyde, and congratulates him on succeeding to the office of lord chancellor. His cousin Charles Fotherby, and his friend, Thomas Philipott, contributed commendatory verses. The translation in heroic verse is of very mediocre character, and is followed by 181 pages of annotations. At their close Boys mentions that he has just heard of the death of Henry, Duke of Gloucester (13 September 1660), and proceeds to pen an elegy suggested by Virgil's lament for Marcellus. The volume concludes with "certain pieces relating to the publick," i.e. on the political matters referred to above, and with a congratulatory poem (dated Canterbury, 30 September 1656) addressed to Boys' friend, William Somner, on the completion of his Dictionarium Saxonico-Latino-Anglicum. Boys' second book is called Æneas, his Errours on his Voyage from Troy into Italy; an essay upon the Third Book of Virgil's "Æneis." It is dedicated to Lord Cornbury, Clarendon's son. A translation of the third book of the Æneid in heroic verse occupies fifty-one pages, and is followed by "some few hasty reflections upon the precedent poem." Boys' enthusiasm for Virgil is boundless, but his criticism is rather childish.
