= Payne Fisher =

English poet

Payne Fisher (1616–1693) was an English poet.

== Early life and education ==
Fisher was the son of Payne Fisher, one of the captains in the royal life guard while Charles I was in Oxfordshire, and grandson of Sir William Fisher, knight. He was born at Warnford, Hampshire, in the house of his maternal grandfather, Sir Thomas Neale. He matriculated at Hart Hall, Oxford, in Michaelmas term, 1634; three years later he moved to Magdalene College, Cambridge. While at Cambridge he first developed 'a rambling head' and a turn for verse-making. He left the university suddenly, around 1638, and entered the army in the Netherlands. There he fought in the defence of Boduc.

Returning to England, before long, he enlisted as an ensign in the army raised (1639) by Charles I for the Bishops' War, and during this campaign made acquaintance with the cavalier poet Richard Lovelace. Subsequently, Fisher took service in Ireland, where he rose to the rank of captain, and, returning about 1644, was made, by Lord Chichester's influence, sergeant-major of a foot regiment in the royalist army. By Prince Rupert's command he marched at the head of three hundred men to relieve York.

Fisher was present at Battle of Marston Moor, but found himself on the losing side. He deserted the royalist cause after the battle, and went to London, where he lived as best he could by his pen.

== Later life ==
Fisher's character was too notorious for him to gain favour by his flatteries, and he lived poor and out of favour after the Restoration.

Fisher died in poverty in a coffee-house in the Old Bailey 2 April 1693, and was buried 6 April in a yard belonging to the church of St. Sepulchre's. William Winstanley summed up Fisher's character in the following words: 'A notable undertaker in Latin verse, and had well deserved of his country, had not lucre of gain and private ambition overswayed his pen to favour successful rebellion.' Winstanley adds that he had intended to 'commit to memory the monuments in the churches in London and Westminster, but death hindered him'.

== Works ==
Fisher's first poem, published in 1650, celebrating the parliamentary victory of Marston Moor, was entitled 'Marston Moor, Eboracense carmen; cum quibusdam miscellaneis opera studioque Pagani Piscatoris, . . .' London, 1650. He always wrote under this name, or that of Fitzpaganus Fisher. By his turn for Latin verse and his adulatory arts, or, as Anthony Wood termed it, by his ability 'to shark money from those who delighted to see their names in print,' Fisher soon became the fashionable poet of his day. He was made poet-laureate, or in his own words after the Restoration, 'scribbler' to Oliver Cromwell.

He wrote not only Latin panegyrics and congratulatory odes on the Protector, dedicating his works to John Bradshaw and the most important of the parliamentary magnates, but also composed elegies and epitaphs in praise of their generals. Thus the 'Irenodia Gratulatoria, sive illus. amplissimique Oliveri Cromwellii . . . Epinicion,' London, 1652, was dedicated to the president (Bradshaw) and the council of state, and concluded with odes on the funeral of Edward Popham (London, 1652) and on the departure to Ireland of Edmund Ludlow (1651). To another work, 'Veni vidi, vici, the Triumphs of the most Excellent and Illustrious Oliver Cromwell . . . set forth in a panegyric, written in Latin, and faithfully done into English verse by T. Manly' (London, 1652, 8vo), was added an elegy upon the death of Henry Ireton, lord deputy of Ireland. The 'Inauguratio Oliveriana, with other poems' (Lond. 1654), was followed the next year by 'Oratio Anniversaria in die Inaugurations . . . Olivari . . .' (London, 1655, fol.), and again other panegyrics on the second anniversary of 'his highness's' inauguration (the 'Oratio . . .' and 'Paean Triumphalis,' both London, 1657). To the 'Paean' was added an epitaph on Admiral Robert Blake, which, like most of Fisher's odes and elegies, was also published separately as a 'broadsheet' (see list in Wood, ed. Bliss, Athenæ Oxon. iv. 377, &c.)

He celebrated the victory of Dunkirk in an 'Epinicion vel elogium . . . Ludovici XIIII . . . pro nuperis victoriis in Flandria, praecipue pro desideratissima reductione Dunkirkæ captaa . . . sub confœderatis auspiciis Franco-Britannorum' (London ? 1655 ?). The book has a portrait of the French king in the beginning, and French verses in praise of the author at the end. Fisher afterwards presented Samuel Pepys with a copy of this work 'with his arms, and dedicated to me very handsome'. It was a usual habit of the poet's to put different dedications to such of his works as might court the favour of the rich and powerful.

He once attempted to recite a Latin elegy on Archbishop Ussher in Christ Church Hall, Oxford (17 April 1656), the undergraduates made such a tumult that he never attempted another recitation at the university. He printed "what he had done" in the Mercurius Politicus (1658), which called forth some satire doggerel from Samuel Woodford in Naps upon Parnassus (1658) (see Wood). It was not till 1681 that the elegy on Ussher was separately issued, and then an epitaph on the Earl of Ossory was printed with it. With the return of the Stuarts the time-server turned his coat, and his verses were now as extravagant in praise of the king as they had been of the Protector. At the Restoration there was a pamphlet entitled 'The Speeches of Oliver Cromwell, Henry Ireton, and John John Bradshaw, intended to have been spoken at their execution at Tyburne 30 June 1660, but for many weightie reasons omitted, published by Marchamont Nedham and Pagan Fisher, servants, poets, and pamphleteers to his Infernal Highness,' 1660, (Bodl.)

He spent several years in the Fleet Prison, and while there he published two works on the monuments in the city churches, written before or just after the Great Fire of London. The first of these compilations is 'A Catalogue of most of the Memorable Tombs, &c., in the Demolisht or yet extant Churches of London from St. Katherine's beyond the Tower to Temple Barre,' written 1666, published 1668, 'two years after the great fire,' London. The second is 'The Tombs, Monuments, and Sepulchral Inscriptions lately visible in St. Paul's Cathedral . . . by Major P. F., student in antiquity, grandchild to the late Sir William Fisher and that most memorable knight, Sir Thomas Neale, by his wife, Elizabeth, sister to that so publick-spirited patriot, the late Sir Thomas Freke' of Shroton, Dorset; from the Fleet, with dedication to Charles II, after the fire, London, 1684. Several editions were published of both these catalogues, including that revised and edited by G. B. Morgan, entitled 'Catalogue of the Tombs in the Churches of the City of London,' 1885.

Besides the works above, and a quantity of other odes and epitaphs, Fisher edited poems on several choice and various subjects, occasionally imparted by an eminent author (i. e. James Howell); collected and published by Sergeant-major P. F., London, 1663; the second edition, giving the author's name, is entitled 'Mr. Howel's Poems upon divers emergent occasions,' and dedicated to Dr. Henry King, bishop of Chichester, with a preface by Fisher about Howell, whom he describes as having 'asserted the royal rights in divers learned tracts,' London, 1664. Fisher also published:

- 'Deus et Rex, Rex et Episcopus,' London, 1675.
- 'Elogia Sepulchralia,' London, 1675, a collection of some of Fisher's many elegies.
- 'A Book of Heraldry,' London, 1682.
- 'The Anniversary of his Sacred Majesty's Inauguration, in Latin and English; from the Fleet, under the generous jurisdiction of R. Manlove, warden thereof,' London, 1685.
