= World Scrabble Championship 1991 =

- 27 September 1991 – 30 September 1991
- Winner: Peter Morris
- Number of players: 48
- Location: London
- Sponsor: Mattel

The World Scrabble Championship 1991 was the first World Scrabble Championship. The winner was Peter Morris, a Canadian, representing the United States.

Plans for a World Scrabble Championship had formed as early as 1986/87. After Coleco bought Selchow and Righter, the company announced that they were interested in helping players to organize a "World-Class Open" in 1988. At the 1987 Nationals, John Williams announced that the first World Scrabble Championship would be held the following summer in New York. It would be 1991, however, before it became a reality.

The 48 players were separated into random groups of 6 and played round robins within their groups. The top 2 players from each group then played a knockout to produce two finalists who played a best-of-three finals.

Morris and Cappelletto split their first two games then met for a final game to decide it all. On his tenth move, Cappelletto made a rare blunder by playing the phony SMAIL instead of CLAIMS. The move may have cost him the championship. As it was, Morris pulled out a complicated end game for a 4-point win and the first world title.

== Complete Results ==
Position	Name	Country	Prize (USD)
1	Morris, Peter	United States	10,000
2	Cappelletto, Brian	United States	5,000
3	Boys, David	Canada	2,500
4	Edley, Joe	United States	1,000
5	Tiekert, Ron	United States	500
6	Cansfield, Joyce	United Kingdom	
7	Simonis, Sandie	United Kingdom	
8	Benjamin, Larry	South Africa	
9	Fisher, Stephen	Canada	
10	Southwell, Charlie	United States	
11	Finley, Peter	England	
12	Cohen, Evan	Israel	
13	Carroll, Charlie	United States	
14	Elbourne, Peter	Malta	
15	Warusawitharana, Missaka	Sri Lanka	
16	Nderitu, Patrick Gitonga	Kenya	
17	Grant, Jeff	New Zealand	
18	Sapong, Kwaku	Ghana	
19	Holgate, John	Australia	
20	Fisher, Andrew	United Kingdom	
21	Spate, Clive	United Kingdom	
22	Nyman, Mark	England	
23	Violett, Bob	United Kingdom	
24	Schonbrun, Lester	United States	
25	Sigley, Michael	New Zealand	
26	Kane, Alistair	Australia	
27	Wapnick, Joel	Canada	
28	Pratesi, Diane	United Kingdom	
29	Filio, Roland	Philippines	
30	Donkoh, George	Ghana	
31	Brown, Christine	Éire	
32	Harridge, Barry	Australia	
33	Appleby, Phil	England	
34	Butler, Lynne	New Zealand	
35	Lawrie, Glenys	Australia	
36	Felt, Robert	United States	
37	Filio, Candido	Philippines	
38	Rowe, Dennis	European Community	
39	Saldanha, Norbert	United Arab Emirates	
40	Saldanha, Allan	United Kingdom	
41	Sim, Tony	Singapore	
42	Berger, Averil	South Africa	
43	Thobani, Shafique	Kenya	
44	Ismal, Muhammed	Malaysia	
45	Cleary, Paul Stephen	Australia	
46	Thompson, Martin	United Kingdom	
47	Levine, Eli	South Africa	
48	Nakai, Ken	Japan	

- Finals
- Game 1: Morris 463 - Cappelletto 349
- Game 2: Cappelletto 368 - Morris 301
- Game 3: Morris 371 - Cappelletto 367
