= Richard Boys =

Richard Boys may refer to:

- Richard Boys (priest) (1783–1866), Church of England clergyman and author
- Richard Boys (cricketer) (1849–1896), English cricketer
- Richard James Boys (1930–2019), British statistician
