= David Boys =

David Boys or Boschus (died 1461), Carmelite, was educated at Oxford University, and lectured in theology at that university; he also visited for purposes of study the University of Cambridge and several foreign universities. He became head of the Carmelite community at Gloucester, and died there in the year 1461. The following are the titles of works written by Boys: 1. De duplici hominis immortalitate. 2. Adversus Agarenos. 3. Contra varios Gentilium Ritus. 4. De Spiritus Doctrina. 5. De vera Innocentia.
