= Edward Boys (priest) =

Edward Boys (1599–1667) was an English divine.

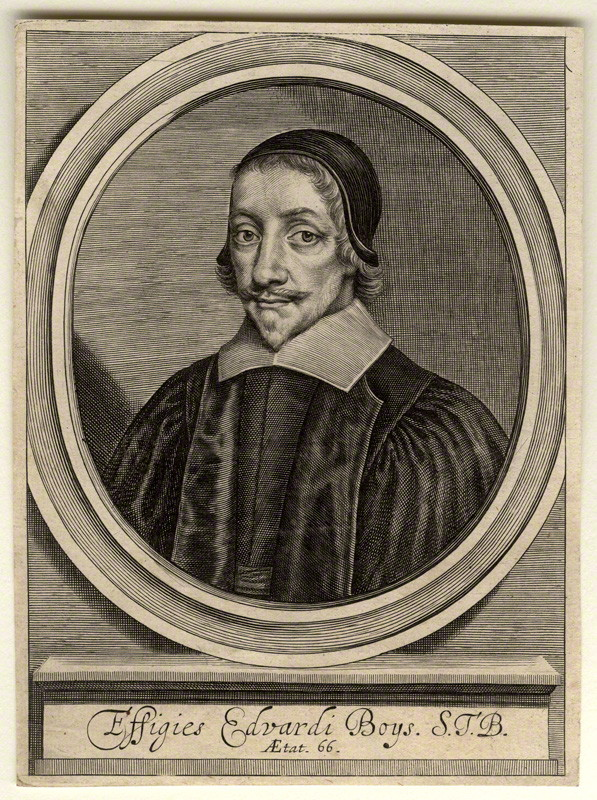
Edward Boys, at age 66

== Life ==
He was a nephew of Dr. John Boys (1571-1625), dean of Canterbury, and the son of Thomas Boys of Hoad Court, in the parish of Blean, Kent, by his first wife, Sarah, daughter of Richard Rogers, dean of Canterbury, and suffragan bishop of Dover.

Educated at Eton, he was elected a scholar of Corpus Christi College, Cambridge, in May 1620, and as a member of that house graduated B.A. in 1623, M.A. in 1627, and obtained a fellowship in 1631.

He proceeded B.D., was appointed one of the university preachers in 1634, and in 1639, on the presentation of William Paston, his friend and contemporary at college, Boys became rector of the tiny village of Mautboy in Norfolk. He is said, but on doubtful authority, to have been one of the chaplains to Charles I. serving from 1639 to 1667.

After an incumbency of twenty-eight years Boys died at Mautboy on 10 March 1666-7, and was buried in the chancel. An admired scholar, of exceptional powers as a preacher, and in great favour with his bishop, Joseph Hall, Boys was deterred from seeking higher preferment by an exceeding modesty.

== Works ==
After his death appeared his only known publication, a volume of Sixteen Sermons, preached upon several occasions, London, 1672. The editor, Roger Flynt, a fellow-collegian, tells us in his preface that it was with difficulty he obtained leave of the dying author to make them public, and gained it only upon condition 'that he should say nothing of him.' From which he leaves the reader to judge 'how great this man was, that made so little of himself.' He speaks, nevertheless, of the great loss to the church ' that such a one should expire in a country village consisting onely of four farmers.'

== Family ==
In 1640 Boys married Mary Herne, who was descended from a Norfolk family.
