= William Boys (Royal Navy officer) =

Royal Navy officer (1700–1774)

Captain William Boys
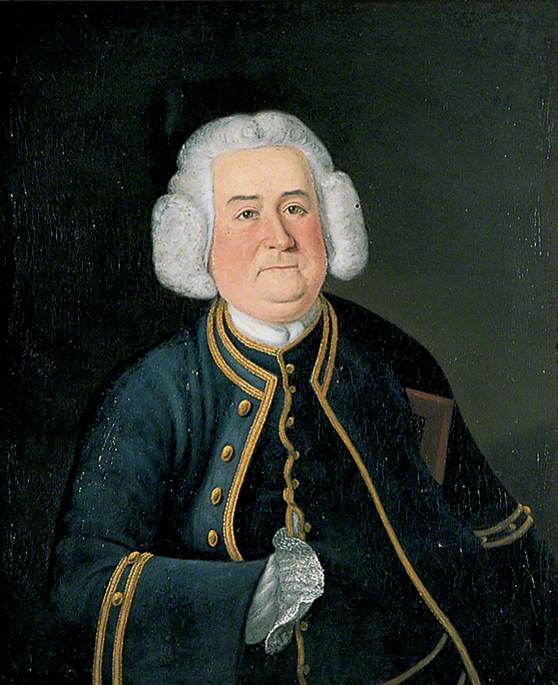
- Boys by an unknown artist
- Born: 25 June 1700
- Died: 4 March 1774
- Military career
- Allegiance: Kingdom of Great Britain
- Branch: Royal Navy
- Rank: Captain
- Commands: HMS Greyhound; HMS Princess Louisa; HMS Pearl; HMS Royal Sovereign; HMS Preston; Nore Command
- Conflicts: Seven Years' War

Captain William Boys (25 June 1700 – 4 March 1774) was a Royal Navy officer who became Commander-in-Chief, The Nore.

== History ==
Promoted to captain, Boys joined the Royal Navy in 1717 and became a midshipman in the third-rate HMS Prince Frederick. In June 1725 he was on board the South Sea Company slaver Luxborough Galley when the ship sunk following a fire and the six survivors only survived by cannibalism. Promoted to captain he became commanding officer of the sixth-rate HMS Greyhound in June 1743, commanding officer of the fourth-rate HMS Princess Louisa in 1744 and commanding officer of the fifth-rate HMS Pearl on the East Indies Station in 1745. He went on to be flag captain to Vice-Admiral Thomas Smith in the first-rate HMS Royal Sovereign in 1755 and commanding officer of the fourth-rate HMS Preston in 1759 and saw action during the Seven Years' War. After that he became Commander-in-Chief, The Nore in 1760 and lieutenant-governor of Greenwich Hospital in July 1761.
