= David Boys (Scrabble player) =

Canadian Scrabble player

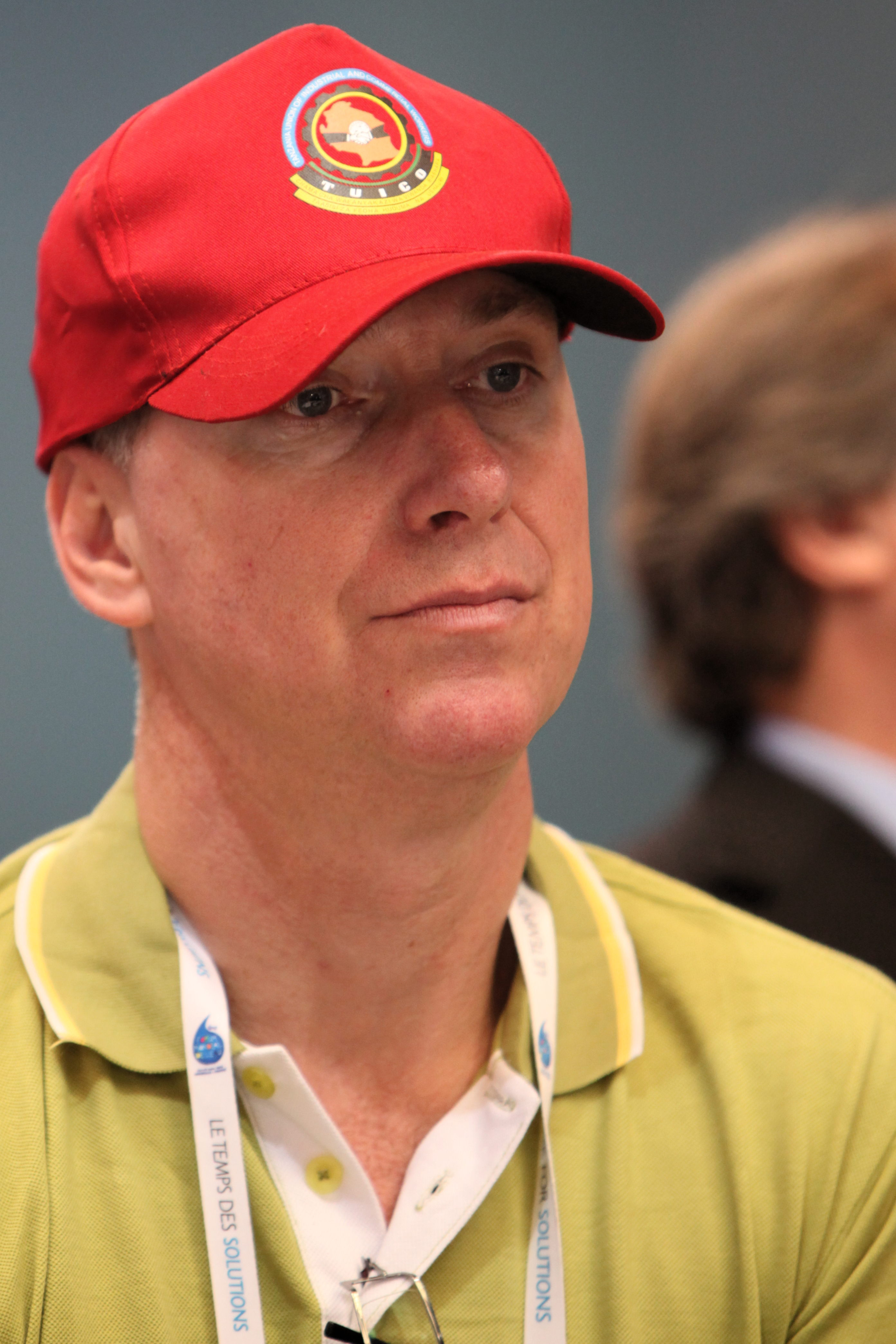
Boys in 2012

David Boys is a top Canadian Scrabble expert. He won the World Scrabble Championship (WSC) in London, UK, in 1995, and the Canadian Scrabble Championship in 2003. He also finished third in the WSC in both 1991 and 1999. In 1996 and again in 2007, he lost a match to a computer. His competitive career began in 1986. He has played in over 1,800 tournament games, winning about 67%, and has earned over $40,000 in prize money. Boys is married and lives with his wife, his son Alex and two daughters, Evelyn and Rebecca in Dorval, Quebec, Canada and works as a programmer analyst.
