= Thomas Flatman =

English painter (1635–1688)

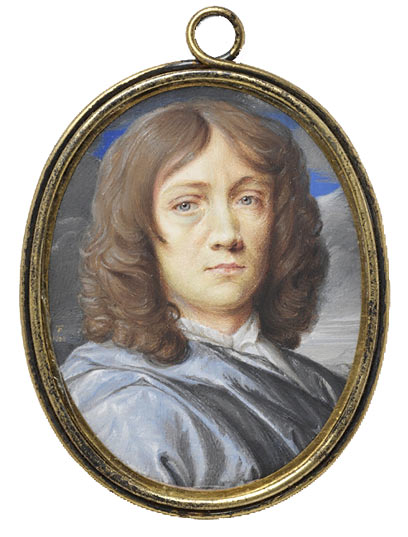
Thomas Flatman, 1635–88, Self-portrait, Dated 1673, Watercolour on vellum V&A Museum no. pp. 79–1938 Victoria and Albert Museum, London

Thomas Flatman (21 February 1635 – 8 December 1688) was an English poet and miniature painter. There were several editions of his Poems and Songs (1674). One of his self-portraits is in the Victoria and Albert Museum. A portrait of Charles II is in the Wallace Collection, London. His miniatures are noted for their vitality.

== Life ==
Flatman was the son of a clerk in Chancery and was born in Aldersgate Street and educated at Winchester College. He went on to study at New College, Oxford. He was later called to the bar in 1662 although he seems never to have practiced as a lawyer. He was a staunch Royalist and one of his poems was to celebrate the return of Charles II in 1660 after the collapse of the Cromwellian Commonwealth.

Among his earliest verses are lines prefixed to Graphice (1658) by Sir William Sanderson, a work containing a description of the art of miniature painting, based on Edward Norgate's writings. Flatman divided his career between writing poetry (in which his earnest religious temperament is revealed) and painting portraits in miniature. A versatile man, he was made a Fellow of the newly founded Royal Society in 1668. A number of his friends were leading clergymen, and many of his sitters were drawn from the Church and other intellectual circles.

Alexander Chalmers attributes the satirical work Don Juan Lamberto, or a Comical History of the late Times to Flatman in his entry in the General Biographical Dictionary of 1812–1817.
