= Joel Wapnick =

Canadian Scrabble player (born 1946)

Joel Wapnick (born 1946) is a Scrabble player from Montreal, Quebec, Canada, best known for winning the 1999 World Scrabble Championship (WSC).

Wapnick reached the WSC finals in 1993 and 2001. Wapnick also won the US National Scrabble Championship in 1983 and the Canadian National Scrabble Championship in 1998 and 2011, along with a string of other events. Wapnick and Adam Logan (WSC 2005, US NSC 1996, CNSC 1996, 2006, 2008, 2013) are the only players so far to have won the WSC, the US NSC and the CNSC. Wapnick also placed second in the National Scrabble Championship in 1992 and third in both 1988 and 2009. Since his career began in 1976, he has played in at least 2,688 tournament games, winning about 63%, and earning over $80,000 in prize money.

Wapnick has published three books on Scrabble, the most recent of which is How to Play SCRABBLE Like a Champion (Puzzlewright Press, 2010). He has also published a novel, The View North from Liberal Cemetery (Wapiti Press, 2014).

Wapnick is a professor emeritus of music, McGill University, Montreal.
