= Peter Morris (writer) =

American baseball researcher and Scrabble player

- Born: 20 May 1962 (age 64); Birmingham, England
- Citizenship: American
- Education: B.A., M.A.
- Alma mater: University of Toronto, Michigan State University
- Occupations: Researcher, Editor
- Writing career
- Notable works: Baseball Fever; A Game of Inches; But Didn’t We Have Fun?
- Notable awards: Seymour Medal, Casey Award, Henry Chadwick Award

Peter Morris (born 1962) is an American baseball researcher and author. A lifelong love of baseball led him to membership in the Society for American Baseball Research, where he became an active member of the Biographical Committee, researching the lives of early major league baseball players.

Morris is a highly respected baseball researcher, and is often interviewed or cited by major media outlets such as National Public Radio. He has written or co-authored nine books (as of 2014), including the major two-volume work A Game of Inches: The Stories Behind the Innovations that Shaped Baseball in 2006, the first book to ever win both the Society for American Baseball Research's Seymour Medal and the Casey Award. In 2012, he served on the Baseball Hall of Fame’s pre-integration committee.

== Early life and education ==
Peter Morris was the first child of Ray and Ruth Morris. When he was two years old, the family moved to Washington, D.C. They moved again when he was seven, to Toronto, Ontario, Canada, where he grew up. He obtained a B.A. in English from the University of Toronto.

In addition to his interest in baseball, Morris was a keen and talented Scrabble player. After completing his B.A., he moved to East Lansing, Michigan, where he was able to hone his skills against many highly skilled players. He won the National Scrabble Championship in 1989, and was the first winner of the World Scrabble Championship, held in London, England in 1991. With no further goals to achieve in Scrabble, he largely dropped out of competitive play soon after his World Championship.

Morris also completed an M.A. in English at Michigan State University.

== Books and awards ==
- 2003 Baseball Fever: Early Baseball in Michigan, Ann Arbor, MI: University of Michigan Press.
- 2006 A Game of Inches: The Stories Behind the Innovations That Shaped Baseball: The Game on the Field (Volume 1), Chicago, IL: Ivan R. Dee.
- 2006 A Game of Inches: The Stories Behind the Innovations That Shaped Baseball: The Game Behind the Scenes (Volume 2), Chicago, IL: Ivan R. Dee.
- 2007 Level Playing Fields: How the Groundskeeping Murphy Brothers Shaped Baseball, Lincoln, NE: University of Nebraska Press.
- 2008 But Didn't We Have Fun?: An Informal History of Baseball's Pioneer Era, 1843–1870, Chicago, IL: Ivan R. Dee.
- 2010 Catcher: How the Man Behind the Plate Became an American Folk Hero, Chicago, IL: Ivan R. Dee.
- 2012 Base Ball Pioneers, 1850—1870: The Clubs and Players Who Spread the Sport Nationwide, (with William J. Ryczek, Jan Finkel, Leonard Levin, and Richard Malatzky), Jefferson, NC: McFarland.
- 2013 Base Ball Founders: The Clubs, Players and Cities of the Northeast that Established the Game, (with William J. Ryczek, Jan Finkel, Leonard Levin, and Richard Malatzky), Jefferson, NC: McFarland.
- 2013 Cracking Baseball’s Cold Cases: Filling in the Facts About 17 Mystery Major Leaguers, Jefferson, NC: McFarland.

Morris’ first book, Baseball Fever: Early Baseball in Michigan, won the Society for American Baseball Research's Seymour Medal in 2004 for the best book on baseball history. He followed this up with his epic two-volume A Game of Inches: The Stories Behind the Innovations That Shaped Baseball, which solidified his reputation as an expert researcher in baseball history. This became the first book ever to win both the Seymour Medal and the Casey Award for best baseball book of the year.

Each of Morris’ subsequent books reflects his meticulous research and his dedication to uncovering forgotten details from the early history of baseball.

In Cracking Baseball’s Cold Cases, Morris describes some of the work that he and other members of the Society for American Baseball Research's Biographical Committee do to fill out and correct details of nineteenth-century baseball players as listed in the Baseball Encyclopedia. He outlines the lives of 17 of these players, and the challenges and triumphs that were involved in tracking them down.

In 2010, Morris was named one of the nine inaugural winners of the Society for American Baseball Research's Henry Chadwick Award, an award established "to honor those researchers, historians, analysts, and statisticians whose work has most contributed to our understanding of the game and its history."

== Other baseball history work ==
Morris is given most of the credit for another significant discovery in baseball history that has not been covered in his books: that William Edward White, who played a single major-league game in 1879, was likely baseball's first black player. White was one-quarter black and was listed as white in most documentation, but was in fact the child of A. J. White and his mulatto housekeeper, Hannah. This research appeared in a 2004 article by Stefan Fatsis, in The Wall Street Journal.

In 2012, Morris served as a member of the 16-person National Baseball Hall of Fame Pre-Integration Committee, who elected Hank O'Day, Jacob Ruppert, and Deacon White to the Hall of Fame.
