= Bananagrams =

2006 tabletop word game

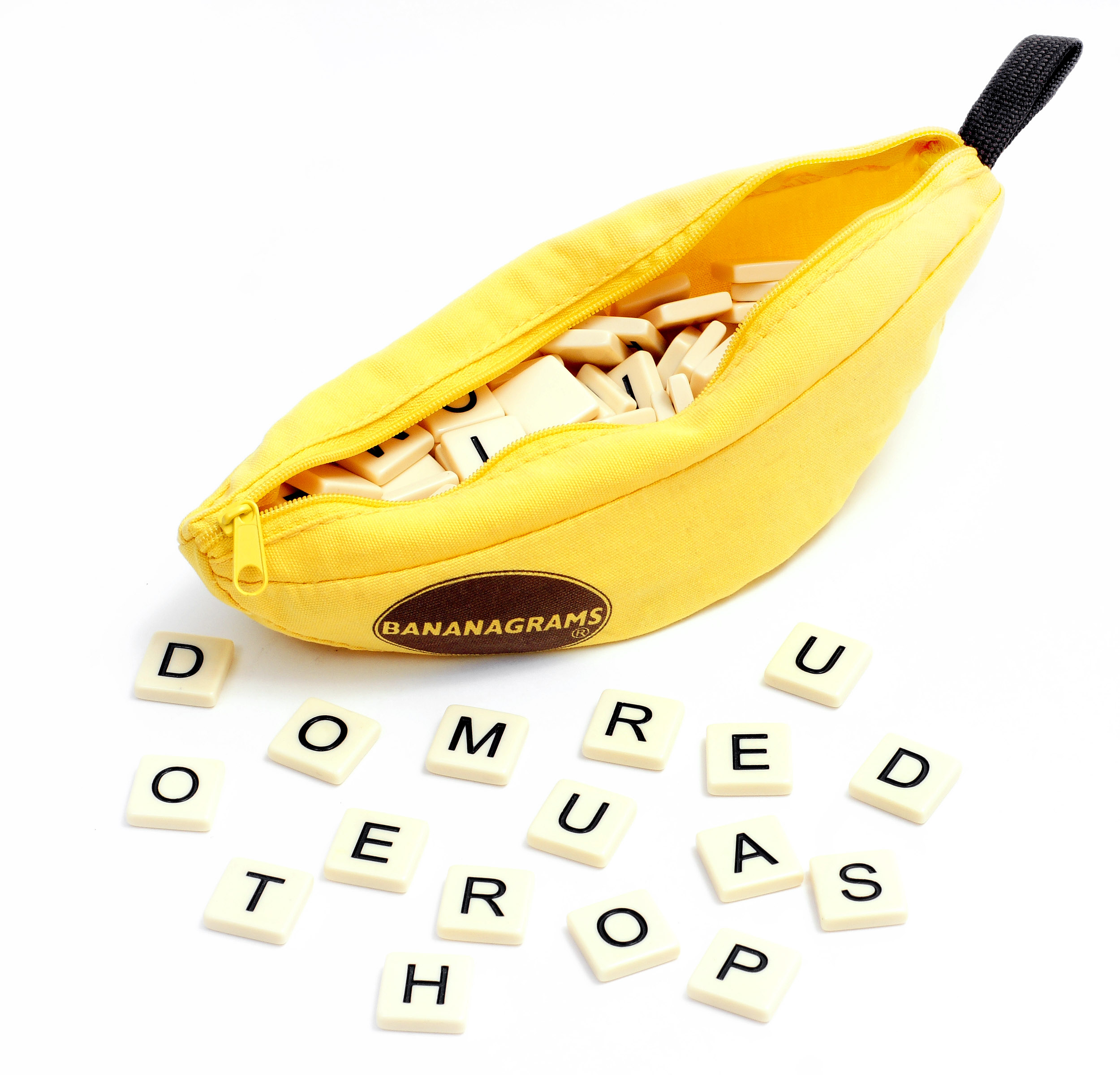
- Bananagrams game bag and word tiles
- Designers: Abraham Nathanson, Rena Nathanson
- Publication: January 2006; 20 years ago
- Players: 2–8
- Setup time: 1–2 minutes
- Chance: Low (tile drawing)
- Skills: Spelling; Anagramming
- Website: http://www.bananagrams.com/

Related games
- Scrabble

Bananagrams is a word game invented by Abraham Nathanson and Rena Nathanson of Cranston, Rhode Island, wherein lettered tiles are used to spell words.

Nathanson conceived and developed the idea for the game with the help of his family. The name is derived from his claim that it's the "anagram game that will drive you bananas!" Beginning as a family innovation, Bananagrams was made available to the public in January 2006 at the London Toy Fair. The game is similar to the older Scrabble variant Take Two.

Gameplay involves players arranging letter tiles into a grid of connected words. Two to eight players can participate, but the game can also be played solo. The object of the game is to be the first to complete a word grid after the pool of tiles has been exhausted. The tiles come in a fabric banana-shaped package.

== Gameplay ==
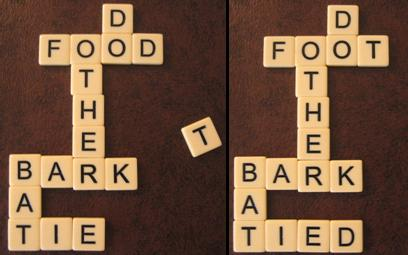
An arranged word grid with a newly drawn tile, "T" (left). In order to fit the "T" in, the "D" at the end of "F O O D" can be moved to another position at which it spells a valid word, yet where "T" would not spell a word, so that "T" can take "D"'s current position (right).

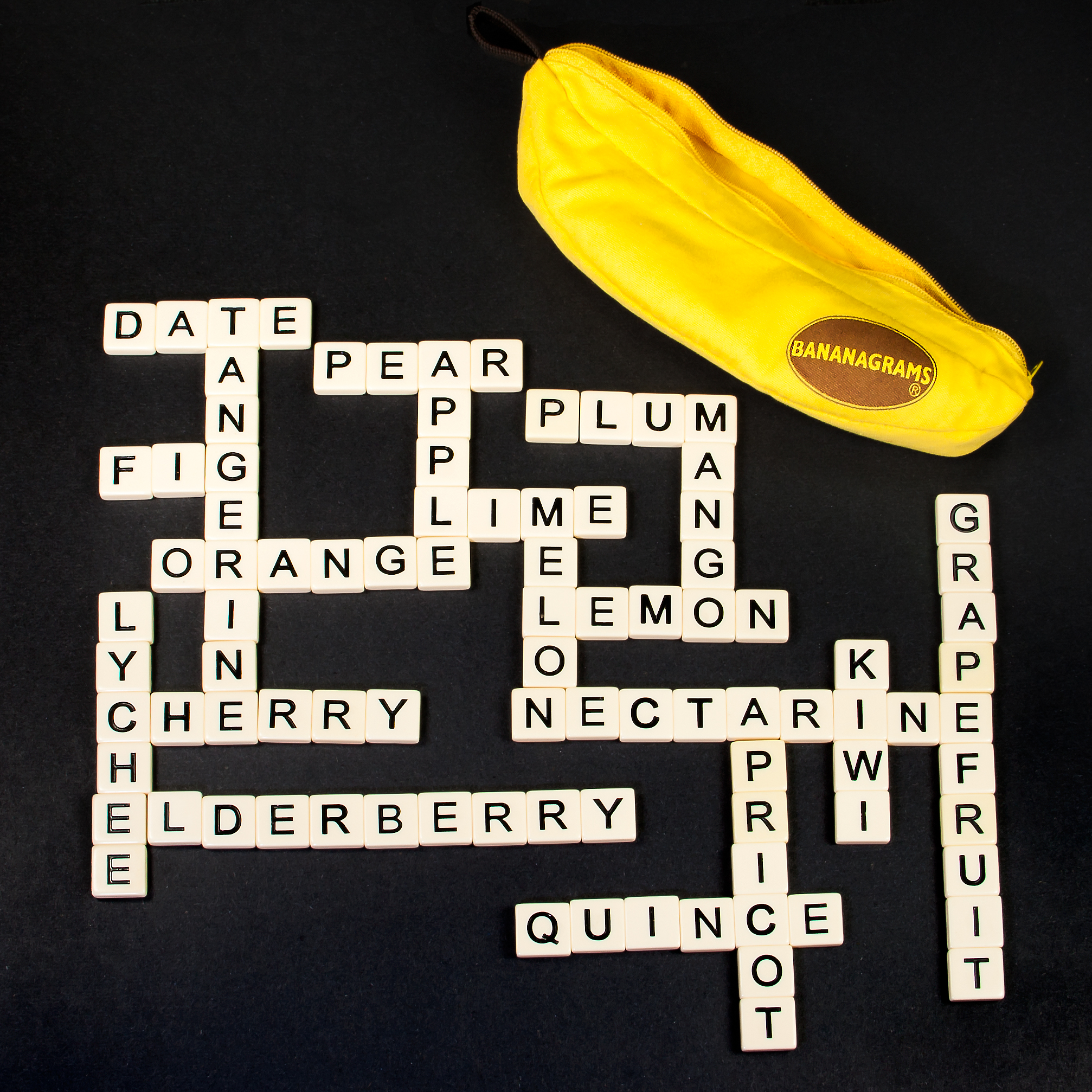

The game consists of 144 lettered tiles that are placed face down on the playing surface. This is called the Bunch. The same number of tiles is drawn by each player (between 11 and 21 depending on the number of players), and once a player calls out "Split!", all the players turn over their tiles to reveal the lettered sides. Each player races to create their own word grids by arranging the letters to form words connected in intersecting or interlocking manner (words should not be separate from one another). You may rearrange your grid as many times as you like – the name "Bananagrams" is a play on the word anagrams, as a player must often rearrange the words one has already formed in order to allow newly drawn tiles to be placed into their grid. When a player uses up all of their tiles, they call out "Peel!" and each player must draw a new tile from the pool of remaining tiles.

If at any time during play a player gets stuck with a tricky letter, the player can announce "Dump!" and exchange any letter for three tiles from the Bunch.

When there are fewer tiles in the Bunch than there are players, the first person to use up all their letters shouts "Bananas" and wins, becoming Top Banana if all of their words are valid.

The letter distribution is as follows:

- 2 of each: J, K, Q, X, Z
- 3 of each: B, C, F, H, M, P, V, W, Y
- 4 of each: G
- 5 of each: L
- 6 of each: D, S, U
- 8 of each: N
- 9 of each: R, T
- 11 of each: O
- 12 of each: I
- 13 of each: A
- 18 of each: E

== Variations ==
The Bananagrams company has expanded with other versions of the classic game. Variations include My First Bananagrams for small children, Bananagrams Duel for a two-player game, Double Bananagrams with double the tiles and Bananagrams WildTiles with wildcard tiles. There also are German, Italian, Spanish, French and Hebrew versions of the game.

== Comparison with other games ==
Bananagrams uses elements of both Boggle and Scrabble. It is similar to Boggle in the sense that gameplay is simultaneous, yet players build interlocking puzzles similar to those in Scrabble. Because Bananagrams can be played by players at any (English) reading level, the game is useful for children who are learning to spell, and has been touted as both educational and popular among consumers. An independent psychologist reviewed Bananagrams and expressed her recommendation of Bananagrams as a positive example of creativity stimulation because, perhaps unlike Scrabble, the goal is to play all of one's tiles, which generates a need to configure and reconfigure one's word grid to accept all of the letters.

Other tabletop word games that are played without a board include Anagrams, Dabble, Perquackey and Quiddler. Bananagrams is also similar to Syzygy, a letter-tile game released in 1997, and the 1999 game Double Quick.

== Awards ==
Bananagrams has won numerous awards for its innovation, popularity among consumers and educational value:

- Game of the Year 2009 by TOTY Awards
- Gold Award, Good Toy Guide (UK 2006)
- Best Toy Bronze Award, Right Start Magazine (UK 2006)
- Top Toy of the Year Award, Creative Child Magazine 2007
- NAPPA Honors Award, Parenthood.com

== Online gameplay ==
An online version of Bananagrams was developed by Large Animal Games, in partnership with Majesco. It ran from 2008 until 2012.

The online version adhered to the same protocol as the tabletop edition, but certain gameplay adjustments and social features were also available. Players could play live games or send challenges to friends, and share completed games with one another. The game also included solitaire modes and "Banana Café", where the objective was to beat one's own best time.

The online game version offered players the opportunity to customize the game with "Banana Chip" credits. Banana Chips were earned by playing games and by issuing and winning challenges. They could be spent in the virtual store to purchase new tiles and playing boards, and to buy in-game hints and bonuses to gain an advantage over other players. Multi-tier achievements were also awarded to players in recognition of outstanding skill, and a leaderboard contained information pertaining to other players.
