= Word search =

Word game

A word search

A word search, word find, word seek, word sleuth or mystery word puzzle is a word game that consists of the letters of words placed in a grid, which usually has a rectangular or square shape. The objective of this puzzle is to find and mark all the words hidden inside the box. The words may be placed horizontally, vertically, or diagonally. Often a list of the hidden words is provided, but more challenging puzzles may not provide a list. Many word search puzzles have a theme to which all the hidden words are related, such as food, animals, or colors. Like crosswords, these puzzles have become very popular and have had complete books and mobile applications devoted to them.

== Strategies ==
A common strategy for finding all the words is to go through the puzzle left to right (or right to left) and look for the first letter of each word (if a word list is provided). After finding the letter, one should look at the eight surrounding letters to see whether the next letter of the word is there. One can then continue this method until the entire word is found.

Another strategy is to look for 'outstanding' letters within the word one is searching for (if a word list is provided). Since most word searches use capital letters, it is easiest to spot the letters that stand out from others. These letters include Q, J, X, and Z.

In some languages, a strategy is to look for letters with diacritics. This is helpful if a word list is provided.

Lastly, the strategy of looking for double letters in the word being searched for (if a word list is provided) proves helpful, because it is easier to spot two identical letters side-by-side than to search for two different letters.

If a word list is not provided, a way to find words is to go row by row. First, all the horizontal rows should be read both backwards and forwards, then the vertical, and so on. Sometimes the puzzle itself will help. The puzzles generated by a computer tend to put words in patterns. Furthermore, the bigger the words and the more words, the easier they are to spot. In some computer-generated puzzles, if the person solving the puzzle sees one word, all they have to do to find more is to look in adjacent rows, columns, or diagonals. The puzzle might use every row, column, or diagonal—or just every other row, column, or diagonal.

== History ==
The word search puzzle (also known as WordSeek, WordFind, WonderWord, etc.) was originally designed and published by Norman E. Gibat in the Selenby Digest on March 1, 1968, in Norman, Oklahoma, although the Spanish puzzle creator Pedro Ocón de Oro was publishing "Sopas de letras" (Spanish "Soup of Letters") before that date.There is a very likely possibility James Patrick Carr of Villa Grove, Illinois created this puzzle before 1968. Pat Carr had titled the puzzles "Slate R Straight" and was stolen by a copyright/patent company he sent the puzzle idea to. There is proof predating Gibats 1968 of PC's puzzles in Villa Grove High School sporting event brochures.

The puzzle was very popular locally and several more followed this original. Some teachers in the Norman schools asked for reprints to use in their classes. One teacher sent them around the country to various friends in other schools. Undoubtedly one of these scattered copies eventually led somebody to sell the idea to a syndicator.

Word search puzzles have been popular on the internet with Facebook games such as the 2013 Letters of Gold. Other digital and tabletop word search mobile games include Boggle, Bookworm, Letterpress, Ruzzle, Wonderword, Wordament, WordSpot and Word Streak with Friends. The mid-70s CBS game show "Now You See It" was a made-for-TV adaptation of a word search puzzle. Those app versions of the game are the reason why it is still one of the leading type of games in App Stores. Parallel to the app market, the genre is widely distributed as a browser-based application on casual web portals, such as CrazyGames, which utilize these algorithms to deliver instant, cross-platform gameplay without installation.

== Secret messages ==
Sometimes secret messages are hidden in the word search. In one variation, the secret message is created by all the words that are written backwards in the puzzle. In another variation, the secret message is created by the letters that are not used in any word within the puzzle. This variation is more common in more difficult puzzles where most letters are used. Kappa Publishing is well known for this. Their Magazines are called "The Magazine with the Last Message" or other saying that is related.

Another type of word search puzzle contains a trivia question at the bottom. Like a traditional word search puzzle, words from a word list must be circled or crossed through in the puzzle. There is also one or more extra word or phrase hidden in the puzzle that is not in the word list. This word or phrase usually answers the trivia question at the bottom of the page.

== Snaking puzzles ==
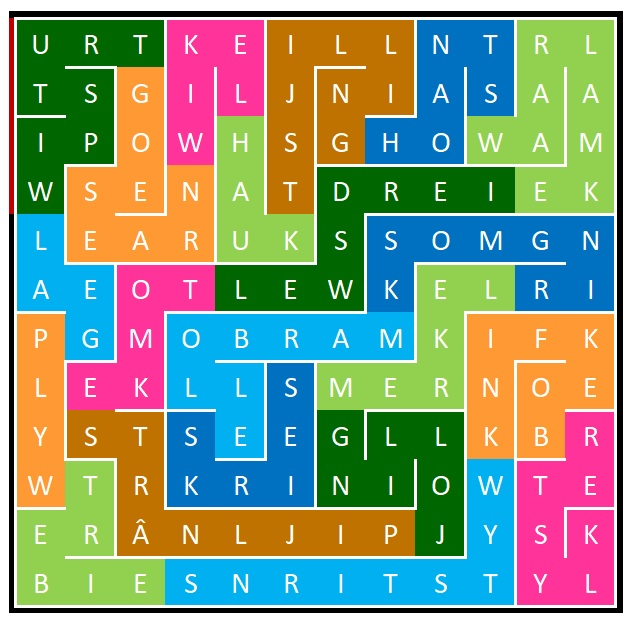
Snaking puzzle

Some word search puzzles are snaking puzzles, in which the word is not a straight vertical, horizontal, or diagonal line, but "bends" at 90 degrees at any given letter. These are much more difficult than conventional puzzles. The difficulty level is further heightened when the next letter can be at 45 degrees, and using the same letter more than once is permitted, too. Snaking puzzles either hide words in a random fashion, or are designed to trace out a path in a definite shape, like a square, rectangle, horseshoe, or donut.

== Teaching ==
Word search puzzles are often used in a teaching or classroom environment, especially in language and foreign language classrooms. Some teachers, particularly those specializing in English as a Second Language (ESL), use word search puzzles as an instructional tool. Other teachers use them as a recreational activity for students, instead. They also use them as April Fools' Day pranks where the word searches involve no words.

On a more advanced level, word searches are good ways to demonstrate the use of searching algorithms.

== See also ==
- Wordament
- Word Puzzle
- Word polygon
- Crossword
- Sudoku
