= Bananagrams (video game) =

2008 video game

- Developer: Large Animal Games
- Publisher: Majesco
- Engine: Large Animal Toga Framework
- Platform: Flash
- Release: Facebook: November 17, 2008; Bebo: December 4, 2008; Myspace: 2008
- Genre: Puzzle
- Mode: Single player / Multiplayer

Bananagrams is an online social game developed by Large Animal Games in partnership with Majesco. It launched on Facebook on November 17, 2008. Success of the Bananagrams tile game developed by the Nathanson family prompted Bananagrams International to extend the brand online. Bananagrams was later released on Bebo and MySpace.

Bananagrams was featured as a top ten addicting game on Facebook by industry insiders on May 6, 2009. On February 18, 2009, Bananagrams received an honorable mention by Bebo as a top five out of over 20,000 applications on the social network in its B.E.S.T developer competition. In 2013, the Facebook version of the game was retired.

== Gameplay ==
The play goals and game experience of the Internet version resemble the board game version. Players are issued tiles which are then used to create interlocking words. If a player has difficulty placing a tile, that player may dump the tile into the bunch and take three more. Depending on game mode, a player may also peel or take one letter at a time once all of their displayed tiles have been used. Upon complete use of a player's allotted tiles, they declare Bananas. If all words are legal, the player wins; if not, the player is given Rotten Bananas and is out of the game.

Single player gameplay. Leaderboard is below the main screen.

For example, proper nouns and foreign words are not considered legal words. Players with non-legal words in solo games will receive a time penalty.

The play modes include Solitaire (both long and shorts games), Banana Café, Live Games, and Challenges.

=== Charms ===
The internet version includes the use of Charms, non-traditional playing aids. While they deviate from the traditional rule set, charms add variation to the online version. To facilitate traditional rules players can disable charms when making multiplayer games.

Charms include:

- Word Check - ensure all words are legal prior to declaring Bananas
- Smart Dump and Smart Peel - place Dumped and Peeled tiles automatically to form a word, if the opportunity exists
- Mini Dump - only one tile is dumped, as opposed to three.

== Technology ==
All instances of Bananagrams online are the same and operate independently of platform using Large Animal Games' TOGA framework. This allows players to compete across social networks. The high score board shows a social network indicator as a small icon to differentiate various networks. Users can add friends across networks as well.

Due to network API variation, interactive features differ across networks. For instance, the invitation mechanism on MySpace allows direct inviting from the game page, while Facebook requires a separate dialog window.
