= William E. Tolman High School =

Tolman High School
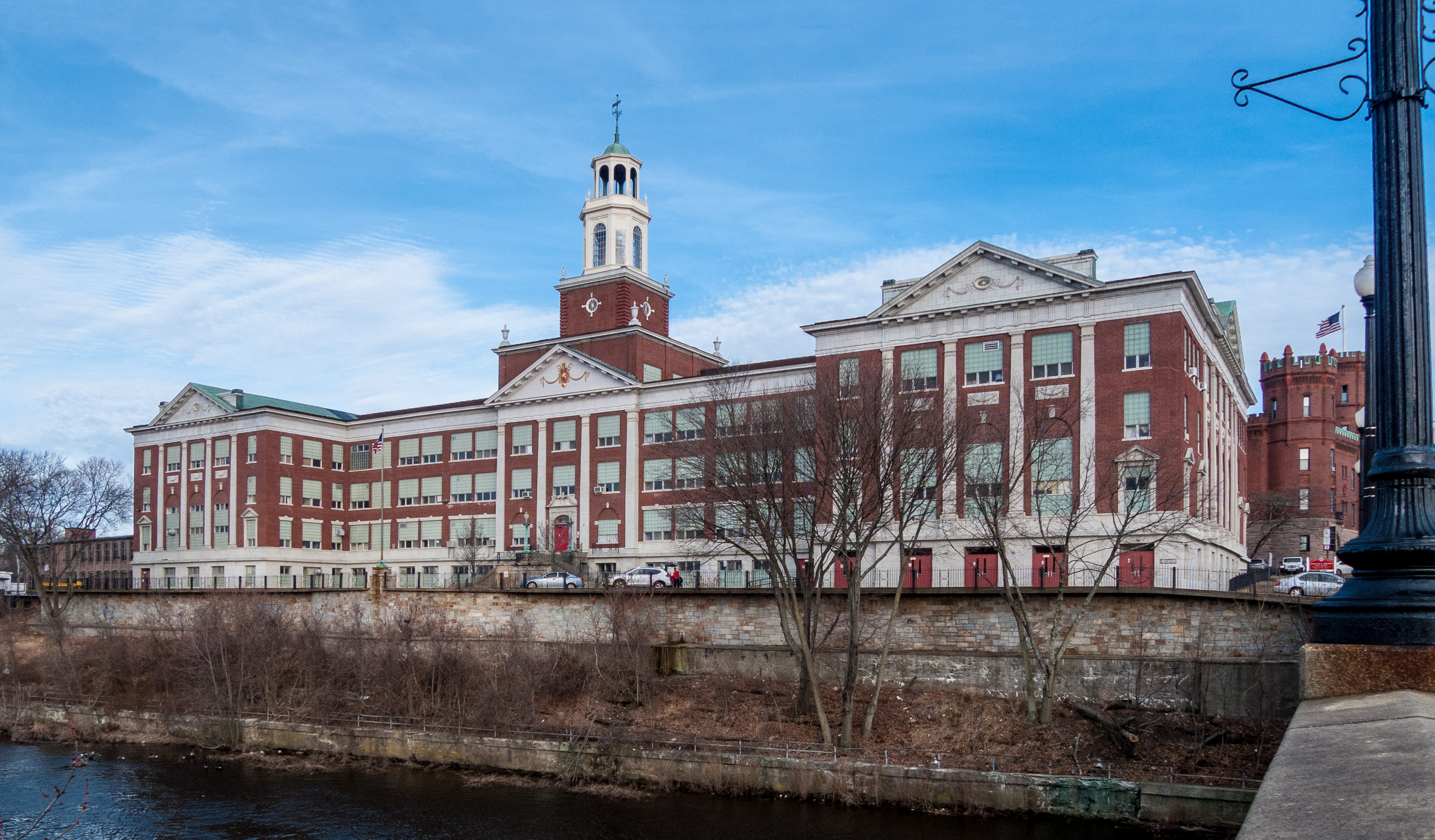

Location
- 150 Exchange St; Pawtucket, Rhode Island 02860; United States; 41°31′30″N 71°13′30″W

Information
- School type: Public high school
- Established: 1926
- School board: Rhode Island Department of Education
- School district: Pawtucket School District
- Superintendent: Randy Buck
- Principal: Christopher Coleman
- Faculty: approx. 110
- Teaching staff: 68.00 (FTE)
- Grades: 9–12
- Enrollment: 1,027 (2023–2024)
- Student to teacher ratio: 15.10
- Language: English
- Campus: Urban
- Colors: White, Red, and Black
- Mascot: Tiger
- Feeder schools: Jenks Jr. High School, Goff Jr. High School
- Website: Website

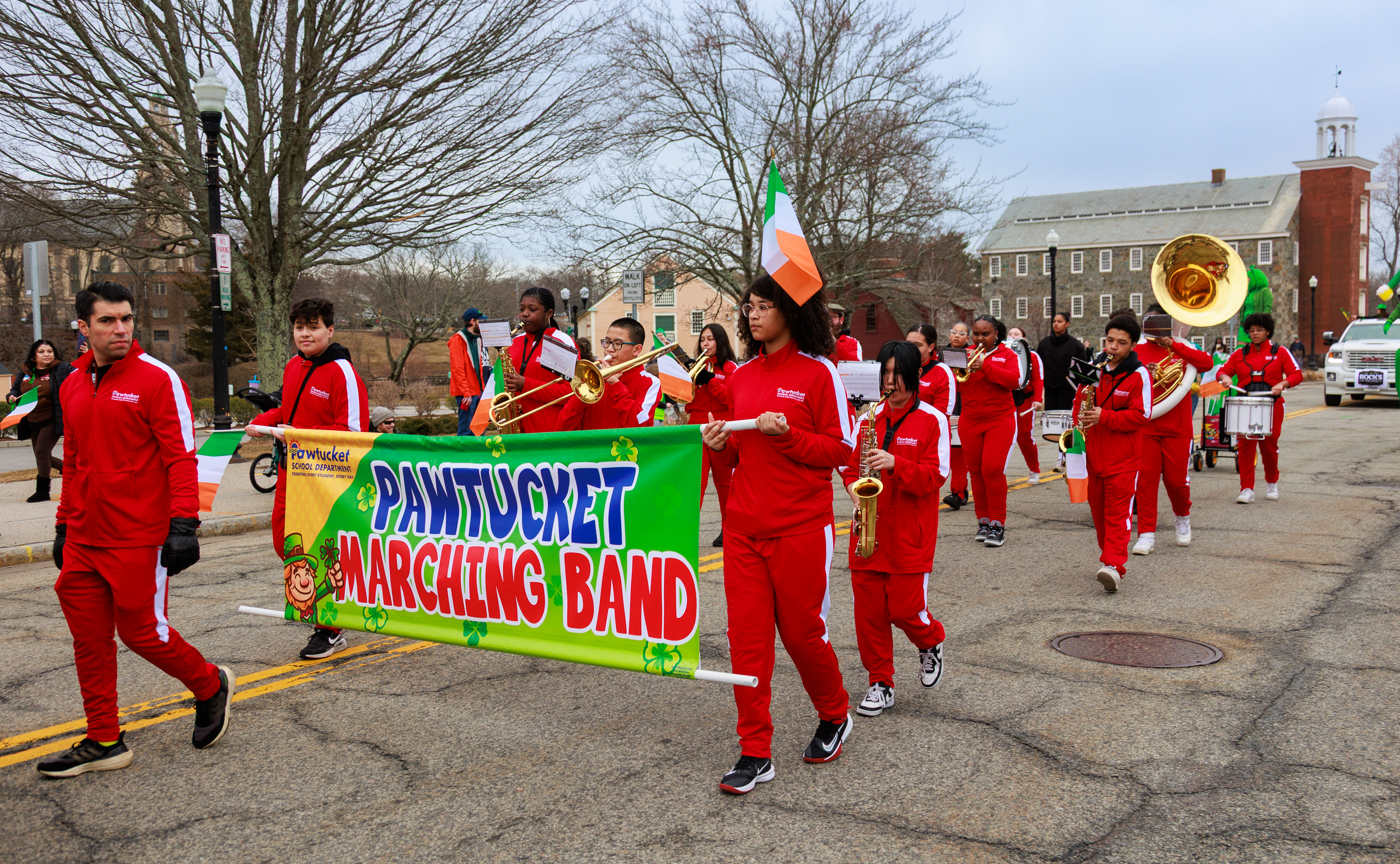
The Pawtucket Marching Band is open to all Pawtucket middle and high school students

William E. Tolman Senior High School (originally Pawtucket Senior High School, changed to Pawtucket East High School, then William E. Tolman Senior High School) is one of three public high schools located in Pawtucket, Rhode Island, United States. It was built and opened in 1926 (Monahan & Meikle, architects) along the east bank of the Blackstone River as a "state of the art" educational facility. The building originally consisted of four floors and a basement, 60 class rooms, a 1,300-seat auditorium, a swimming pool, and a nursery for the children of teenage mothers. The swimming pool was closed in 2018 due to several repairs made and it still leaked. The nursery was closed around 2012 in order for Rhode Island's only MCJROTC to use the area in the basement. Tolman High School is the first multimillion-dollar high school east of the Mississippi and the gym is the oldest high school gym in Rhode Island that is still in use. The school has been remodeled several times with the most recent being in 1980.

The school's pool was also featured in the film Mermaids and the school is in some scenes of the film Moonstruck.

== Thanksgiving football rivalries ==
Tolman High School shared a 73-year-old Thanksgiving Day football rivalry with nearby private school, Saint Raphael Academy. However, due to the trend in lopsided games resulting from a more powerful private school, it was decided in 2001 that Tolman's new rival would be Shea High School, the city's other public high school. Saint Raphael had been leading the series 38–31–4 before it was dissolved. They had won the final 8 meetings by a combined score of 270–6.

In the summer of 2010, due to realignment by the Rhode Island Interscholastic League and request by Saint Raphael Academy, Saint Ray's dropped from Division I to Division II B, the same division as Tolman. On September 17, 2010, for the first time since 2001, Tolman revived its rivalry with Saint Ray's. Tolman won the contest with a score of 37–0.

In the days of the old rivalry on Thanksgiving Eve, Tolman students would participate in the annual Burning of the Casket ceremony on the Blackstone River. This ceremony would take place after the Homecoming dance and involved the release of a burning casket down the Blackstone River. The tradition of the burning of the casket however, was abandoned in the early 2000s. The traditional pep rally held prior to the game was canceled in 2009 but returned the following year.

The 2024 Shea vs. Tolman Thanksgiving game saw the debut of a new district-wide marching band. The band is open to all Pawtucket middle and high school students.

== Dropout rate ==
With only 54% of freshmen making it to their senior year, a study released by Johns Hopkins University for the Associated Press in 2007 called Tolman High School one of the nation's 'dropout factories' among high schools. However, students who dropout but go on to receive their GED, transfer students, and students who were held back one or more grades are counted as dropouts. Local officials said that many students from low-income families move between urban districts frequently and some travel back to their home country often adding to the dropout count twice. State statistics however match the findings that fewer than 60 percent of students were retained until senior year. According to the Rhode Island Department of Elementary and Secondary Education, the graduation rate for Tolman in 2008 was 58.4% with 24.3% dropping out compared to the state graduation rate of 73.9% with 14.9% dropping out.

== Security issues ==
Security at Tolman High School was greatly scrutinized in the fall of 1996 when a Providence teenager blindly fired a .45 caliber semiautomatic pistol in the school cafeteria following a fistfight at a school dance. A ban on outsiders at school dances and an increase in police officer presence at the school was enforced by the superintendent following the shooting. A proposal for a requirement for all students to wear photo identification during regular school hours was another major policy brought forth shortly after the event. Student IDs were issued for a number of years, but were discontinued due to funding issues. Weeks after the shooting, the suspect was arrested at a Dunkin' Donuts in Johnston, Rhode Island, after a detective learned he was in the store preparing to flee the state.

In March 2001 a student allegedly threatened a teacher saying that he had a .22 pistol at home with bullet with the teachers name on it.

On December 10, 2002, a student was jumped outside of the school by a group of students he accidentally bumped into in the hallway in which the student received 65 stitches and suffered numbness and scarring. The attackers were identified using a school yearbook and four students were charged with assault and expelled for the rest of the school year. The student's father said that there were other outbreaks of violence in the Pawtucket school system and alleged that school administrators were keeping them quiet. He also demanded that police officers be posted inside Pawtucket school buildings. School Committee members voted unanimously to commission the Blue Ribbon Violence Committee, headed by former Attorney General Sheldon Whitehouse, in response to the outrage. In legal papers, the student said that the assault "took place as a result of the city's failure to provide adequate supervision and security" in the public schools and demanded $100,000, the statutory limit for damages in a municipal liability case.

In May 2003 a student was suspended for carrying a weapon similar to brass knuckles in school.

In September 2003 a task force on school violence said that school violence is going unchecked because students who are most likely to commit acts of violence are students prone to academic failure, and the Pawtucket school system has few programs to help those students.

On January 12, 2005, nine young men were arrested for fighting outside of Tolman. Police were forewarned about the fight but it took 10 police officers to break up the fights because every time they would move the group a fight would break out around the corner. Two of the people arrested weren't residents of Pawtucket.

In the spring of 2007, a suspicious looking object resembling a pipe bomb caused the evacuation of Tolman High School. The state's fire marshal's bomb squad was called in after a teacher spotted the object in a second floor locker. The bomb squad applied a small explosive charge to destroy the object. When a second larger explosion did not occur, the fragments were sent away for testing to learn more about the object. It was concluded that it was, in fact, part of the school's circa 1927 pipe organ that was decommissioned during the renovation of the school's auditorium. Two students later confessed they stuck the piece of organ into a locker for safekeeping.

== Demographics ==
The numbers below are from the Rhode Island Department of Elementary and Secondary Education for the 2011–2012 school year.

Ethnicity	Number of Students	Percentage
White	489	42%
Hispanic	388	34%
Black	286	27%
Asian Pacific	13	1%
American Indian	6	<1%
Two or More races	71	6%
Total	1158	100%

== Notable alumni ==
- Charles Avedisian (1917–1983) - Class of 1936, Providence College football co-captain and American football player with the New York Football Giants (1942–44)
- Peter Kilmartin (b. 1962) - Class of 1980, Rhode Island state representative and attorney general
- Kevin Lima (b. 1962) - Class of 1980, Disney animator and film director of the films A Goofy Movie, Tarzan, 102 Dalmatians, Eloise at the Plaza, Eloise at Christmastime, and Enchanted
- Abraham Nathanson (1929–2010) - Class of 1948, developer of the game Bananagrams.
- Gerry Philbin - Class of 1960 - football player with the Detroit Lions and New York Jets
- Hank Soar (1914–2001) - Class of 1933, Providence College All-American football player, American League umpire from 1949 to 1971
- Lee Ann Trinquier (Leeann A. Silva) - Class of 1984, current BMI songwriter. (died 12/10/2021)
