= RocketBowl =

2004 video game

- Developer(s): LargeAnimal
- Publisher(s): GarageGames
- Platform(s): Microsoft Windows, Xbox 360
- Release: PC: November 4, 2004; XBLA: September 10, 2008
- Genre(s): Sports
- Mode(s): Single-player, multiplayer

RocketBowl (also RocketBowl Plus) is a sports game developed by LargeAnimal and published by GarageGames, released November 4, 2004 for Windows. The game features a retro-futuristic 1950s theme. It was also released on the Xbox 360 through Xbox Live Arcade on September 10, 2008.

== Gameplay ==
Typical gameplay screenshot.

The game is a cross between bowling and miniature golf, in which the player must strike 10 pins with a bowling ball, but in a completely open area rather than an enclosed lane, with the other frames visible on the landscape; it is possible to knock down the pins of another frame while bowling.

Each frame features a green pin (or pins) called the "money pin" that awards cash when knocked down. There are also coins scattered around the "frame" that also awards cash.

After each successful set of frames, the player has the option to buy items, including 20 bowling balls each with special powers, such as rockets that allow the bowler to immediately blast the ball in a different direction.

As the game progresses, each frame becomes more and more like specialized miniature golf holes, with alternate routes, obstacles, and so forth.

== Development ==
LargeAnimal had previously developed many games before RocketBowl and had games developed by them receive awards prior to the release of RocketGames. Wade Tinney and Coray Seifert wrote an article for a book titled Fundamentals Of Game Development, and in this article they talk about how important team building is for games like RocketBowl, "[W]e took the whole team bowling so they could figure out other gameplay mechanics that would work well with bowling". As well as team building, in an article written on Game Developer, Wade Tinney talked about what went right and what went wrong in the development of RocketBowl listing things like: having a clear vision for the game, a good game engine in Torque, the time they had to make it, as good things that went right and: lack of money, lack of planning, and overall gameplay as things that did not go as they would have hoped.

== Reception ==
In a review written by Dave Kosak on November 4, 2004, RocketBowl is described as "the future".

At the Independent Games Festival in 2005, RocketBowl won the Web/Downloadable game section's award for Technical Excellence.
