= Boggle =

Timed dice-based word game

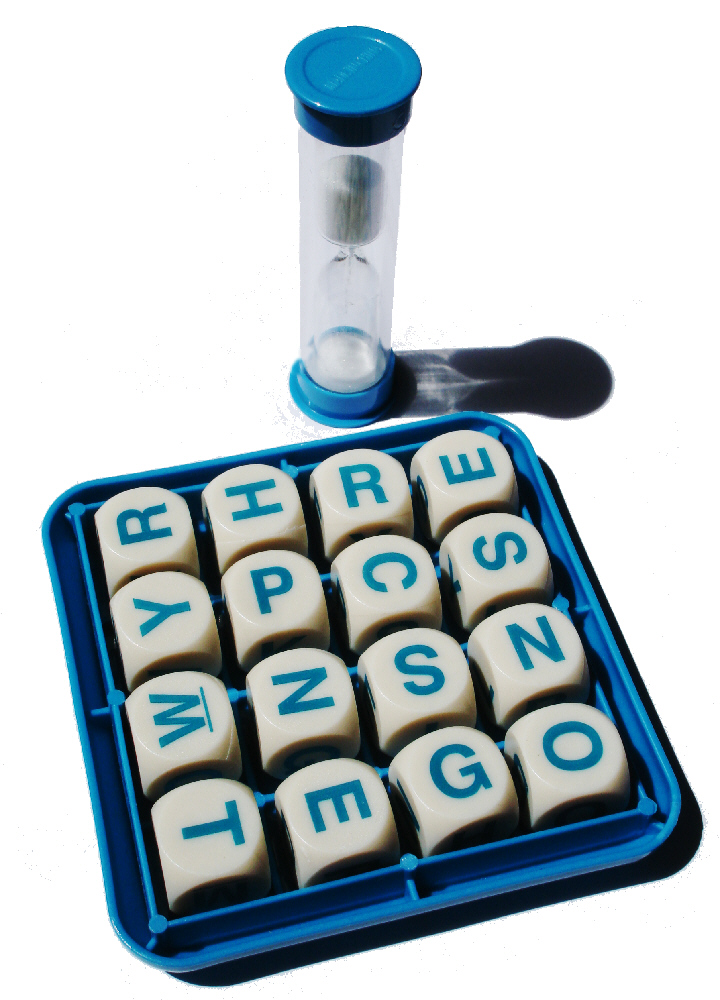
- A grid of Boggle cubes and a sand timer
- Manufacturers: Parker Brothers (now Hasbro); Winning Moves Games USA
- Designers: Allan D. Turoff (Inventor)
- Publication: 1973; 53 years ago
- Genres: Word game Dice game
- Players: 2+
- Setup time: 1 minute
- Skills: Language
- Materials required: Paper and writing utensil

Boggle is a word game introduced in 1973 and in which players try to find as many words as they can from a grid of lettered dice, within a set time limit. It was invented by Allan Turoff and originally distributed by Parker Brothers.

== Development and beginnings ==
Allan Turoff, a New York–based designer trained at the Pratt Institute in Brooklyn, worked in industrial design before shifting to toy and game development in 1964 in search of more innovative and creative work.

After creating and selling his first toy idea—which ultimately was never manufactured due to production cost concerns—Turoff continued developing new concepts. Seeking a commercially viable design, he turned his attention to word-based games.

In 1969, Turoff built a prototype of a letter-grid word game in his workshop. Originally titled Find-A-Word, the game challenged players to form words from randomly arranged letters within a confined grid and was designed to appeal to both children and adults.

Turoff initially presented the game to Parker Brothers, but the company rejected it. In 1972, when Parker Brothers began developing a line of word games, the company revisited Turoff’s design. The game was subsequently refined, renamed ‘‘Boggle’’, and released commercially for the 1973 holiday shopping season, alongside two other Parker Brothers word games, ‘‘Fluster’’ and ‘‘Grapple’’.

== Rules ==
Three words found in a sample Boggle game: CRESSET (and subwords such as CRESS and SET), CHYPRES (plurals are allowed), and SONG (extending to SONGS disallowed as it repeats the S)

One player begins the game by shaking a covered tray of 16 cubic dice, each with a different letter printed on each of its sides. The dice settle into a 4×4 tray so that only the top letter of each cube is visible. After they have settled into the tray, a three-minute sand timer is started and all players simultaneously begin the main phase of play.

Each player searches for words that fit the following criteria:

- Words must be at least three letters in length.
- Each letter after the first must be a horizontal, vertical, or diagonal neighbor of the one before it.
- No individual letter cube may be used more than once in a word.
- No capitalized or hyphenated words are allowed.

Multiple forms of the same word are allowed, such as singular and plural forms and other derivations. Each player records all the words they find by writing on a private sheet of paper. After three minutes have elapsed, all players must immediately stop writing and the game enters the scoring phase.

In this, each player reads off their list of discovered words. If two or more players wrote the same word, it is removed from all players' lists. Any player may challenge the validity of a word, in which case a previously nominated dictionary is used to verify or refute it. Once all duplicates and invalid words have been eliminated, points are awarded based on the length of each remaining word in a player's list. The winner is the player whose point total is highest, with any ties typically broken by a count of long words.

One cube is printed with "Qu". This is because Q is nearly always followed by U in English words (see exceptions), and if there were a Q in Boggle, it would be challenging to use if a U did not, by chance, appear next to it. For the purposes of scoring, Qu counts as two letters; for example, squid would score two points (for a five-letter word) despite being formed from a chain of only four cubes. Early versions of the game had a "Q" without the accompanying "u".

Word length	Points
3, 4	1
5	2
6	3
7	5
8+	11

Different versions of Boggle have varying distributions of letters. For example, a more modern version in the UK has easier letters, such as only one K, but an older version (with a yellow box, from 1986) has two Ks and a generally more awkward letter distribution.

Using the sixteen cubes in a standard Boggle set, the list of longest words that can be formed includes inconsequentially, quadricentennials, and sesquicentennials, all seventeen-letter words made possible by q and u appearing on the same face of one cube.

Words within words are allowed, such as "mast" and "aster" within "master". Neither the cubes nor the board may be touched while the timer is running.

== Game variants ==
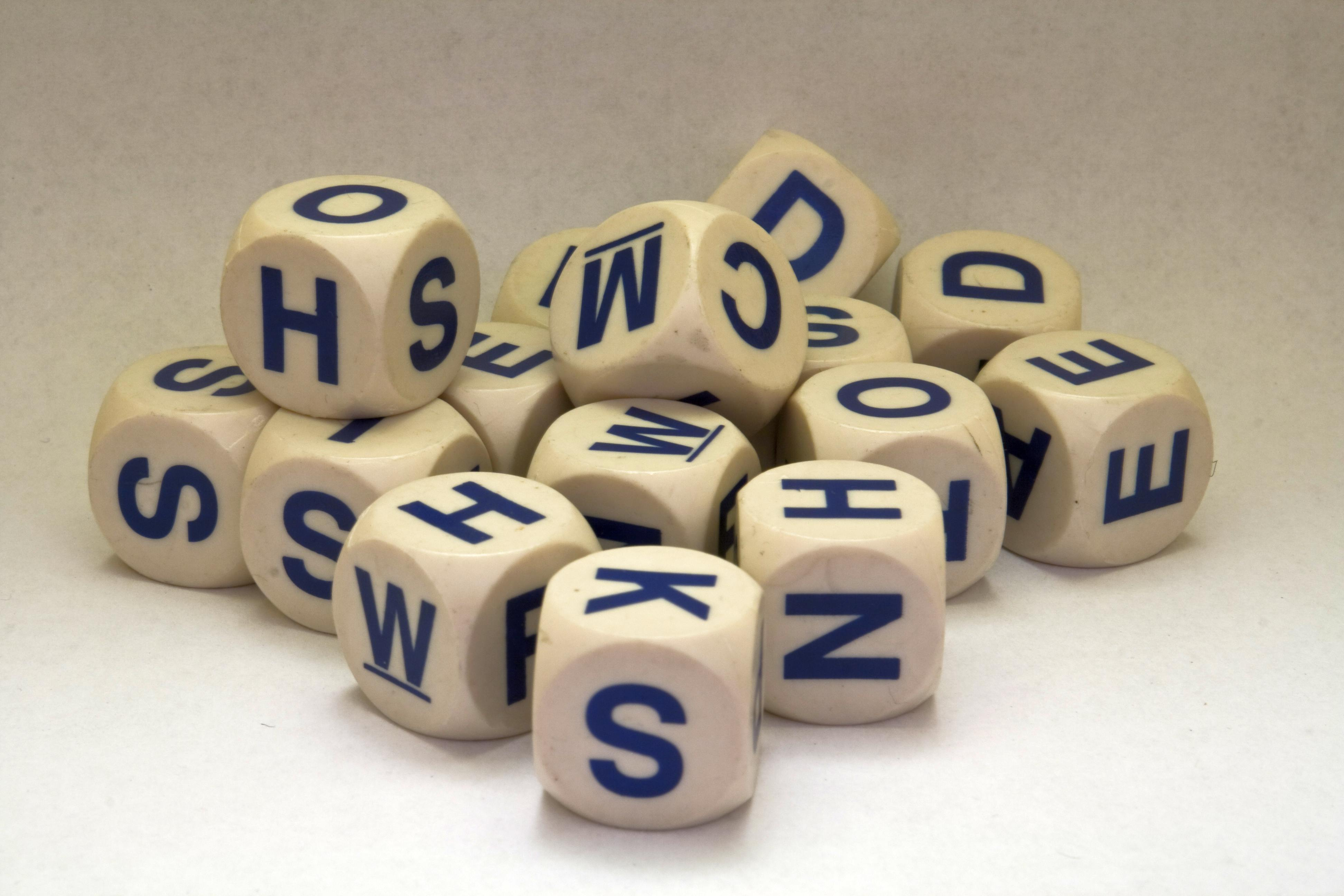
A pile of Boggle dice

Parker Brothers has introduced several licensed variations on the game.

Boggle Jr. is a much-simplified version intended for young children introduced in 1988. Boggle Travel is a version of the standard 4×4 set designed to be traveled. The compact, zippered case includes pencils and small pads of paper, as well as an electronic timer, and notably, a cover made from a soft plastic that produces much less noise when the board is shaken.

Big Boggle, later marketed as Boggle Master and Boggle Deluxe, featured a 5×5 tray, and disallowed three-letter words. Some editions of the Big Boggle set included an adapter that could convert the larger grid into a standard 4×4 Boggle grid. In the United Kingdom, Hasbro UK released Super Boggle in 2004 (now discontinued), which features both the 4×4 and 5×5 grid and an electronic timer that flashes to indicate the start and finish. Despite the game's popularity in North America, no version of Boggle offering a 5×5 grid was marketed outside Europe for an extended period until 2011, when Winning Moves Games USA revived the Big Boggle name for a new version. Their variant features a two-letter die with popular letter combinations such as Qu, Th and In.

In 2008, Parker Brothers released a self-contained version of the game with the dice sealed inside a plastic unit and featuring an integrated timer. Although the older version has been discontinued, some retailers refer to the newer one as "Boggle Reinvention" to avoid confusion.

In 2012, Winning Moves Games USA released a 6×6 version of the game called Super Big Boggle. In addition to the two-letter dice with popular letter combinations, there is also a die containing three faces which are solid squares. These solid squares represent a word stop, which is simply a space that may not be used in any word. The other changes are that the time limit was increased from three minutes to four minutes, three-letter words are no longer allowed, and there is a modified scoring scheme, outlined below.

Scoring for the 6×6 version
Word length	Points
4	1
5	2
6	3
7	5
8	11
9+	2 points per letter

Other Boggle variants have included:

- A version of the standard 4×4 set that included a special red "Boggle challenge cube", featuring six relatively uncommon letters. Bonus points are awarded for all words making use of the red cube.
- Boggle CD-ROM, a version for Windows, produced and marketed by Hasbro Interactive, including both 4×4 and 5×5 versions, several 3-D versions, and facilities allowing up to four players to compete directly over the Internet.
- Body Boggle, which is more akin to Twister than it is to standard Boggle. Two players work together as a team, using their hands and feet to spell words on a large floor mat containing pre-printed Boggle letters.
- Boggle Bowl, in which players roll their own dice and compete to build longer words, in order to move their token toward their goal on a (bowl-shaped) playing area. Similar to Scrabble, the play area has special spaces, but here they alter the play for the next round.
- A 1998 game show pilot episode hosted by Bill Rafferty that was not picked up for a full production season.
- Boggle, an interactive game show hosted by Wink Martindale. It aired on The Family Channel (now ABC Family) in 1994, replacing the interactive version of Trivial Pursuit.
- Coggle, which functions similarly to Boggle but involves creating a word to fit a particular theme. It was mainly marketed in France and Canada.
- Boggle Flash. An electronic version of Boggle, but consists of five tiles in which one to ten players make words by swapping tiles. This product is sold in the United States under the name Scrabble Flash.
- Foggle, where the 16 dice have to be used to form valid mathematical equations.

Numerous unofficial computer versions and variants of the game are available. By 1989, users of MIT's Project Athena competed in the online game mboggle. In 2013, Ruzzle, a mobile phone game based on Boggle, topped the most-downloaded iPhone apps chart. Other games similar to or influenced by Boggle include Bananagrams, Bookworm, Dropwords, Letterpress, Puzzlage, SpellTower, Word Factory, Wordquest, Word Racer, WordSpot, Word Streak with Friends, WordTwist, and Zip-It.

Hub Network game show Family Game Night featured a game titled Bounce and Boogie Boggle, which used an electronic 5x5 game. Based on Boggle Reinvention, the main difference is that the letters would be displayed on the stage screen, and the players would have to jump on the letters in order to display their choice. Despite being part of the TV series, this game did not feature on its video game counterpart Hasbro Family Game Night 4: The Game Show.

== Club and tournament play ==
While not as widely institutionally established as Scrabble, several clubs have been established for the purpose of organizing Boggle play. Official Boggle clubs exist at a number of educational institutions, including the Dartmouth Union of Bogglers at Dartmouth College, the Western Oregon University Boggle Club, the University of Michigan Boggle Club, Berkeley Boggle Club at the University of California, Berkeley, CCA Boggle Club at Canyon Crest Academy, and Grinnell College Boggle Club.

Unlike Scrabble, there is no national or international governing or rule-making body for Boggle competition and no official tournament regulations exist. When it comes to creating Boggle games for tournament play, most of the time it is done by special software designed to generate completely random and probably fair boards, using words oftentimes pre-selected by the officiating committee.

== Reception ==
Games magazine included Boggle in their "Top 100 Games of 1980", praising it as a "fast-moving word game".

== Reviews ==
- Games #1
- Jeux & Stratégie #6
- Family Games: The 100 Best

== See also ==
- Peggy Hill, a King of the Hill character known for her devotion to competitive Boggle
- Perquackey
