= Wonderword =

Word search puzzle

Wonderword is a word search puzzle, still created by hand, with a solution at the end. All the words in the grid connect and the remaining letters spell out the answer. The puzzles are either in a 15×15 or 20×20 grid. Each puzzle has a title, theme, solution number and wordlist.

== History ==
Wonderword first entered syndication in Edmonton and Montreal in 1970. In 1980 Universal Press Syndicate of Kansas City assumed syndication rights and continues to do so today. It appears in 2 formats: A 15×15 grid Monday through Saturday and 20×20 for Sunday editions. For space reasons, some Sunday newspapers carry a 15×15 version under the name Teleword. It's estimated that Wonderword has over 1 million players a day.

Wonderword was created by Canadian author Jo Ouellet, and in 1994 her son David Ouellet appeared as co-author until her death in 1997. David Ouellet continues the feature today with his wife Sophie Ouellet and Editor Linda Boragina and a staff of researchers.

== Features ==
Wonderword currently appears in over 225 newspapers across North America. Wonderword also publishes books in 2 types of series. The Treasury books offer puzzles that already have been published and date back as early as 1980. The Treasury books contain about 133 puzzles, 25 of which are the larger 20×20 size. The second series of books are the Collected Wonderword in the Volume sequence. The puzzles have been created specifically for the book and sometimes have a theme within a theme. Book themes include Presidential Edition, Classical Television and Book of Celebrities. The Volume books contain a total of 43 puzzles, 9 of which are the larger 20×20 size. Wonderword also appears in a daily "page-a-day" desk calendar.

== How to play ==
The words are found in all directions — vertically, horizontally, diagonally and backwards.

Players should read all the words in the word list, then look at the puzzle. Once a word is found, circle each letter of the word or highlight it. The letters are used more than once so it's recommended not to circle the entire word. It is best to find the long words first. As each word is found, strike it out from the list. Once every word is found, the remaining letters will spell out the solution, or "Wonderword" in order.

== Recognition ==
Wonderword has done puzzles that have caught the attention of Boeing, Swarovski and Bill O'Reilly among others.

Wonderword is part of the Puzzle Society.
