= Bumper Stars =

2008 video game

- Developer: Large Animal Games
- Publisher: Large Animal Games
- Engine: Large Animal Toga Framework
- Platform: Adobe Flash
- Release: Facebook: April 24, 2008; Bebo: October 2008; Shockwave: 2008; Candystand: October 2008; MySpace: 2008; MSN: May 6, 2009 iPhone: July 15, 2009
- Genre: Pinball
- Modes: Single-player, multiplayer

Bumper Stars is an online, social, arcade game published on select social networking sites. Developed by Large Animal Games, Bumper Stars was released on April 24, 2007 on the social networking website Facebook. The game was later released on Bebo and MySpace. Stand-alone versions of Bumper Stars are also available on Candystand and Shockwave. Since its release, over 20 million games have been played.

Bumper Stars was featured as a top ten addictive game on Facebook by industry insiders on May 6, 2009.

Bumper Stars was a showcased finalist at the 2008 Electronic Entertainment Expo as part of IndieCade '08.

== Gameplay ==
Bumper Stars is described as a hybrid of pool and arcade games. While the aiming process is similar to billiards, the resulting character action mimics pinball. The player clicks the Star, drags the mouse to aim, and then releases the Star. The object of the game is for a player’s "Star" (character) to consume as much available food product as possible within three shots, while hitting the "bumpers"(large, round, stationary items on the screen) to earn additional points. Special bumpers add a multiplier to the player’s score when hit. Players looking to maximize scores will try to hit as many special bumpers in a single shot as possible. Bonus points are earned when all special bumpers disappear and when the player clears a level in a single or two shots.

Special bumpers add a multiplier to the player’s score when hit. Players attempting to maximize scores will try to hit as many special bumpers in a single shot as possible. Bonus points are earned when all special bumpers disappear and when the player clears a level in a single or two shots.

Players will earn credits in solo games each time they play (once a day for starting the game) and for achieving a new high score. In challenge games the winner receives credits based on the number of challenge participants.

== Game Features ==
=== The Store ===
Each new player begins with default items, including a green arena, basic bumpers, fruit, and the character Bumpy Beaver. Players may add items through purchase in the game’s Store. The Store contains characters, background settings (also referred to as ‘arenas’) bumpers, and food products for use in game. Each player may purchase items with either credits (earned by playing games and winning challenges) or Benjees (a game currency developed by Large Animal Games requiring purchase through a third party).

=== Achievements ===
Players are awarded achievements for outstanding game play such as earning a high score or playing challenges. Players are rewarded with credits for earning achievements. Achievements are located in the My Stuff tab or the player information box and are visible to other players once earned.

=== Leaderboards ===
Bumper Stars features extensive score keeping between friends and the rest of Bumper Stars players across all social networks the game is published on. Scores are kept based on average score, best score, # of game friends, and credits earned.

=== Multiplayer ===
Players have the option of solo play, or issuing challenges to anyone with the application. Challenges can be completed across platforms (i.e. if a player is on Facebook, he or she may challenge other players on MySpace or Bebo).
