= Abraham Nathanson =

American graphic designer

- Born: November 26, 1929; Pawtucket, Rhode Island, U.S.
- Died: June 6, 2010 (aged 80); Narragansett, Rhode Island, U.S.
- Education: Pratt Institute
- Occupation: Graphic designer
- Known for: Creating the game Bananagrams

Abraham Nathanson (November 26, 1929 – June 6, 2010) was an American graphic designer. He created the game Bananagrams, a game that uses letter tiles similar to Scrabble with the addition of the element of speed.

== Biography ==
Nathanson was born in Pawtucket, Rhode Island, on November 26, 1929, where he graduated from Pawtucket East Senior High School. His father was a fruit peddler. Following the completion of his service in the United States Army, Nathanson enrolled at Pratt Institute, where he studied graphic design. He left college after a year and opened a design studio in Pawtucket with his brother. He went into business for himself, opening George Nathan Design in a historic mill in Pawtucket, Rhode Island, a firm that made graphics for gift items.

Frustrated with the slow pace of a Scrabble game he was playing with his grandson, Nathanson sought to create a game that combined the word game aspect of Scrabble, but that had the excitement of the element of speed. He told the Boston Globe that "we need an anagrams game so fast, it'll drive you bananas". At the age of 76, he created Bananagrams, which uses a set of 144 tiles and no board, with players arranging the tiles to form words in crossword fashion. The first player to play out all of his tiles in a crossword grid shouts "Bananas" to indicate he has won; games last about 10 to 15 minutes. The banana-shaped pouch was designed by his former wife.

He manufactured 50 copies of the game, half of which his daughter sold in England and the other half he quickly sold in the U.S. Another 500 sets were manufactured and quickly sold. The game was an instant hit at the 2006 London Toy Fair and was named game of the year by the Toy Industry Association in 2009. In addition to domino-like Appletters and spelling game Pairs in Pears, the Bananagrams brand has been spun off to Facebook and the iPhone, with the original game selling 3 million copies in 2009.

Nathanson, a resident of Cranston, Rhode Island, died at age 80 of cancer on June 6, 2010, at his summer home in Narragansett. He was survived by three daughters and four grandchildren.
