= Norman Gibat =

American technical engineer, author and puzzle designer (1929–2012)

- Born: October 30, 1929; Fostoria, Ohio, U.S.
- Died: June 22, 2012 (aged 82); Fostoria, Ohio, U.S.
- Citizenship: United States (1929–2012)
- Known for: First publisher of Word search puzzle

Norman Edlo Gibat (Fostoria, Ohio, October 30, 1929 – Fostoria, December 14, 2012) was an American engineer, writer, and puzzlemaker.

== Biography ==
Norman Gibat was the son of Effie Pearl (Notestine) Gibat and Gustaf Gibat. Against the advice of his parents and teachers, Norman dropped out of Fostoria High School during his freshman year, but that did not deter him from continuing his education later. He later completed his high school courses and earned his GED. Gibat studied mathematics and electrical engineering at Oklahoma City University and attended the Graduate College of the University of Oklahoma in Norman, Oklahoma. He served in the United States Marine Corps during the Korean War. He also taught radar and antenna courses with the Federal Aviation Administration at Will Rogers World Airport after taking night classes at Tinker Air Force Base.

His first step was to start the printing company Popular Topics Press. From there he expanded into buying, repairing and selling used printing equipment. The next step was to enter the new and rapidly evolving world of computers, selling computers and setting up computer systems for businesses and industries.

In 1973, he started the information technology services company Noguska Industries in Fostoria, Ohio. All of his companies were family-owned.

== First Word Search ==
From 1968 to 1971, he owned a printing company in Norman that published the Selenby Digest advertising flyer. The flyer's name actually stood for "buy and sell". Selenby was a small want-ad digest distributed free and was available at Safeway, TG&Y, and other stores. Gibat's first word search was published on March 1, 1968. According to Gibat's stated puzzle rules, the hidden words could run up or down, diagonally, and be read forward or backward. Players could circle the words in the puzzle. He called his type of puzzle "Oklahoma anagram". The word list consisted of names of cities and towns in the former state of Oklahoma. The letter field measured 8.5 x 5.5 inches. In the second puzzle, he used the streets of Norman. His goal was to make waiting in lines at the grocery store a little more pleasant.

Shortly after its publication, several teachers asked him for copies for their students so that they could use the puzzles as teaching aids. One teacher sent copies of the puzzles to friends, relatives, and teachers in other cities. The "Oklahoma Diagram" was later given various names, including Circle Circle , Seek and Circle , Search a Word, Word Find, WonderWord and Word Seek.

The Word searchpuzzle proved to be much more popular than the content of the magazine. Gibat tried in vain to make the publication profitable. He stopped publishing the Selenby Digest and word puzzles in 1970. It cost him too much effort to come up with new puzzles every time. It is not entirely certain whether Gibat's puzzle was the very first word search. The puzzle type was not patented, which is also the reason why word searches spread so quickly around the world. Because the rights to the name of the word search were never registered, there is no fixed name for this type of puzzle.

In 1973, he returned to Fostoria, Ohio, where he and his wife ran a computer business. He died in 2012.

== Writer ==
In addition to some small publications:

- Making Wine, Beer & Merry (1973)
- The Lore of Still Building: or getting to know your local sheriff. A primer on the production of alcohol for food and fuel; with Kathleen Howard (1973)
- Broken Ties ISBN 978-1884111099
