= Chuck Avedisian =

American football player (1917–1983)

No. 55
- Position: Offensive and defensive guard

Personal information
- Born: September 19, 1917; West Hoboken, New Jersey, U.S.
- Died: August 26, 1983 (aged 65); New Britain, Connecticut, U.S.
- Listed height: 5 ft 9 in (1.75 m)
- Listed weight: 225 lb (102 kg)

Career information
- High school: Pawtucket (RI)
- College: Providence College; Columbia University

Career history
- New York Giants (1942–1944)
- Stats at Pro Football Reference

Charles Toros Avedisian (September 19, 1917 – August 26, 1983) was an American professional football player in the National Football League (NFL) and later a public school administrator of athletic programs.

== Early life ==
Born in West Hoboken, New Jersey (now part of Union City), to parents of Armenian descent, Avedisian grew up in Pawtucket, Rhode Island, and graduated from Pawtucket Senior High School (PSHS, later known as the William E. Tolman High School) in 1936. He was a co-captain of the 1935 PSHS football team and was named to the first team on the 1935 Providence Journal All State Football Team as a fullback. Avedisian then entered Providence College where he received a B.Phil degree with the class of 1941. He later studied at Columbia University where he received an M.A. degree from Teachers College, Columbia University in 1944 and a Teachers College Professional Diploma in 1953 from Columbia for expertise in supervision of health education and physical education in schools.

== New York Football Giants ==
Avedisian played college football at Providence College where he was co-captain of the 1940 Friar football team (Providence College no longer has a intercollegiate football team). He then joined the New York Football Giants where he played right guard under coach Steve Owen from 1942 to 1944 while he was a student at Columbia pursuing an M.A. degree (Avedisian is one of two Providence alumni to have played for the Giants, the other being Hank Soar). He was among over 1000 personnel in the NFL at the time who also served in the military in WWII. At 5'9" and 225 pounds he would be considered rather small by today's norm for a guard where players at this position typically exceed 6' and weigh more than 300 lbs. Avedisian was a member of some notable Giants teams in his brief history with the Giants. He started in a game against the Detroit Lions on November 7, 1943, played at Briggs Stadium (later renamed Tiger Stadium (Detroit) in 1961), which ended in a scoreless tie. No NFL game played since then has ended in a scoreless tie. The 1944 Giants are ranked as the #1 defensive team in NFL history in terms of points per game allowed, "...a truly awesome unit". They gave up only 7.5 points per game (a record that still stands) and shut out five of their ten opponents. In one of those shutouts, a 31–0 victory over the Washington Redskins (now the Washington Commanders) on December 10, 1944 at Griffith Stadium in Washington, D.C., Avedisian (as a defensive guard) intercepted a pass thrown by Redskins great Sammy Baugh and returned it 48 yards for a touchdown. The next week the Giants lost 14–7 in the 1944 NFL Championship Game – the equivalent of today's Super Bowl – played at New York's Polo Grounds to a Green Bay Packers team coached by Curly Lambeau of Lambeau Field fame. The loser's share for playing in this game was $900 per player and the winning team share was $1,500 which were records at the time, but a far cry from the $89,000 losing share and $164,000 winning share for the 2024 Super Bowl. Said Avedisian in 1979, "I took my money and went to Gimbels with my wife and we bought a rug. We still have it".

Avedisian also contributed to football strategy by his invention with Robert G. Trocolor of the "unbalanced T formation" which they described as "...the most powerful offense in football, conjoining the speed and deceptiveness of the T backfield with the power of the unbalanced line". Avedisian was inducted into the Providence College Athletic Hall of Fame in 1972 and the New Britain, Connecticut Sports Hall of Fame in 1999.

== Later life ==
While playing for the Giants, Avedisian began a career in secondary school teaching and coaching in 1943 when he was hired by the Columbia Grammar School in New York City as a biology teacher and the head coach of both the football team (his 1943 CGS football team record was 3–2–1) and basketball team (his CGS 1943-44 basketball team record was 11-1). In 1944 he accepted a position as the biology teacher and head football coach at the Horace Mann School (HMS) in Riverdale, New York where he remained until 1952. His HMS football teams compiled a record of 19–18–3 during his tenure.

Avedisian then embarked on a 28-year career as a public school administrator of athletic programs, first in the New Britain, Connecticut public school system as its director of athletics until 1966 and then in the Darien, Connecticut, public school system as director of athletics where he remained until his retirement in 1980. During his period in New Britain, Avedisian was also responsible for arranging halftime performances of the New Britain High School marching band at several New York Giants games played at Yankee Stadium in the early 60s. Avedisian received many honors for his accomplishments as a physical education administrator including the American Alliance for Health, Physical Education, Recreation and Dance's Channing Mann Award in 1977 for excellence in the administration of athletic programs in public schools. He was married to the late Alyce Basmajian (1922-2010) of Providence, Rhode Island, from 1944 until his death on August 26, 1983, in New Britain. They had two children, Dr. C. Thomas Avedisian of Ithaca, New York, and Carole Avedisian of Methuen, Massachusetts.
