= Perquackey =

Word game played with dice

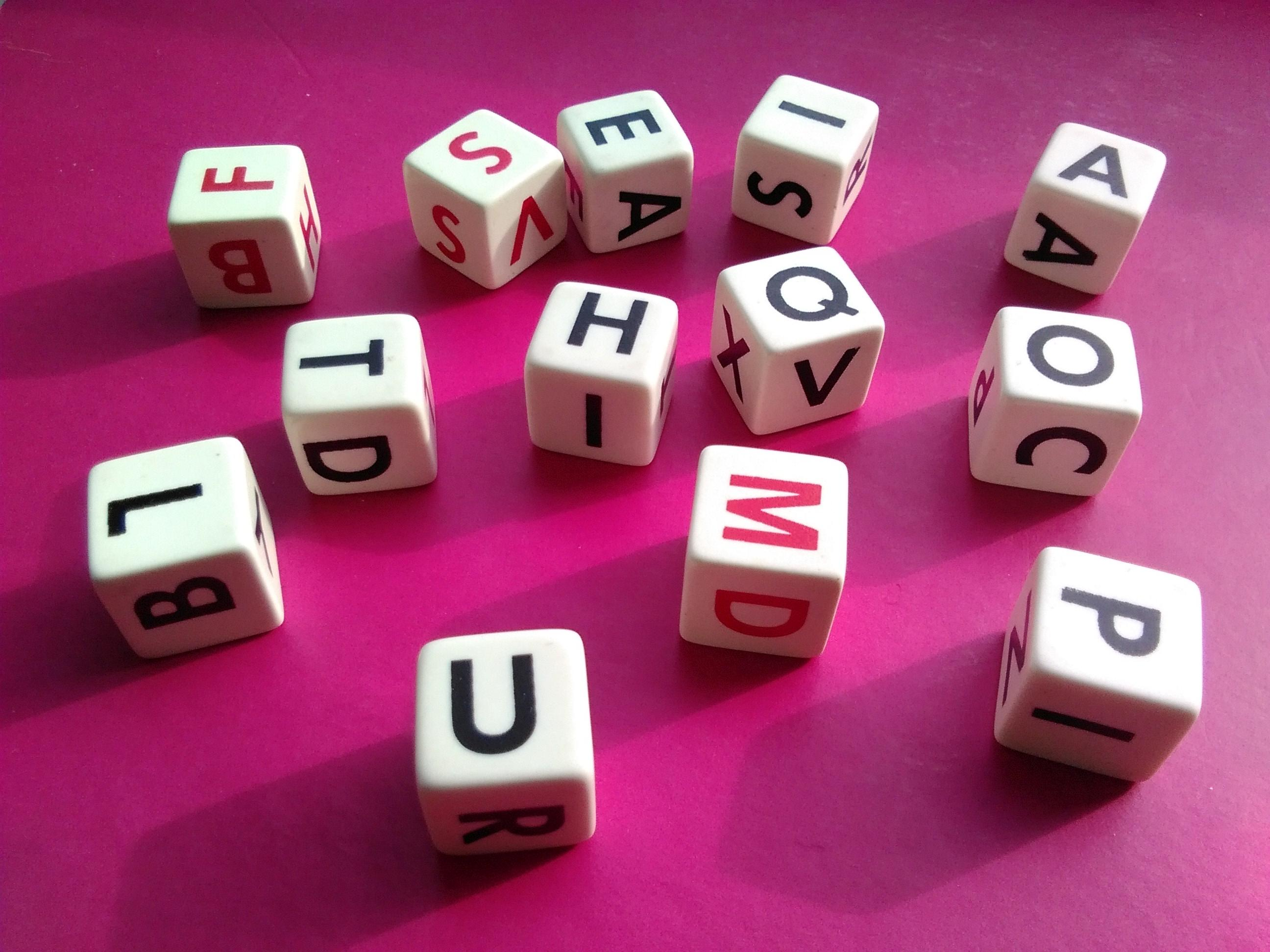
- Designers: Hollingsworth Bros.
- Publishers: Cardinal Games; Long Island City, New York
- Publication: 1956; 70 years ago
- Players: 2 or more
- Setup time: Brief
- Playing time: Short
- Chance: Medium
- Age range: 7 and up
- Skills: Spelling; Word creation from random letters
- Includes: shaker cup, 10 black dice, 3 red dice, timer, instructions

Perquackey is a word game played with dice, produced by Cardinal Industries, Inc. of Long Island City, New York, United States. It was previously produced by Lakeside Toys, a division of Lakeside Industries, Inc. of Minneapolis, Minnesota, and originally by The Shreve Company of Los Angeles, California. It is similar to the 1956 game Spill & Spell.

== Gameplay ==
The game is played with 10 black-lettered dice and three red-lettered dice.

Each player, initially, rolls the 10 black-lettered dice. The player must rearrange them into as many words as possible within a certain time while reusing the letters repeatedly. Points are scored according to the length of each word and the number of words made. Once a player reaches 2,500 points (2,000 points in some versions), all 13 dice are used; all words must now contain at least four letters. A player with at least 2,500 points is considered vulnerable; at least 500 points must be scored in a turn, or 500 points are deducted from their score.

The first player to reach 5,000 points is the winner.

== Distribution ==
The dice are labeled as follows:

- Black dice:
  - A,A,A,E,E,E (2)
  - B,H,I,K,R,T
  - F,H,I,R,S,U
  - G,I,M,R,S,U
  - E,J,Q,V,X,Z
  - F,I,N,P,T,U
  - C,M,O,O,P,W
  - D,L,N,O,R,T
  - B,L,O,O,W,Y
- Red dice (classic):
  - Q,S,S,V,W,Y
  - B,F,H,L,N,P
  - C,D,G,J,K,M
- Red dice (post-2004?):
  - B,F,P,Q,S,Y
  - C,D,G,J,K,M
  - H,L,N,S,V,W

== Reviews ==
- The Playboy Winner's Guide to Board Games

== See also ==
- Boggle
- Scrabble
