= Dabble =

Word game

The Fast Thinking Word Game
- Designers: George Weiss
- Publishers: INI, LLC
- Players: 2-4
- Playing time: 30 minutes

Dabble is an anagram word game designed by George Weiss, who was 84 years old at the time, and published by INI, LLC in 2011.

An app version was Kotaku's gaming app of the day in 2012.

== Gameplay ==
Players draw lettered tiles in order to arrange them into words on a tiered tile rack. Each of the five tiers leaves room for a word of a certain number of letters. The first player to make five valid words wins.
