= Word Puzzle =

2007 video game

- Developer: InterServ
- Publisher: Microsoft Game Studios
- Platform: Xbox 360 (XBLA)
- Release: November 7, 2007
- Genre: Word game
- Modes: Single-player, multiplayer

Word Puzzle is a puzzle game based on word search for Xbox Live Arcade on the Xbox 360. The game was released on November 7, 2007.

== Reception ==
Reception

Aggregate scores
Aggregator	Score
GameRankings	47%
Metacritic	43/100

Review scores
Publication	Score
GameSpot	4.5/10
GamesRadar+	1.5/5
IGN	5.5/10
TeamXbox	4.4/10

Word Puzzle received negative reviews from critics upon release. On Metacritic, the game holds a score of 43/100 based on 16 reviews, indicating "generally unfavorable reviews". On GameRankings, the game holds a score of 47% based on 14 reviews.
