= WordSpot =

- Designers: Russell Ginns
- Publishers: Front Porch Classics
- Players: 2
- Playing time: 20 minutes

WordSpot is a fast-paced word search board game where players use transparent tokens to highlight words found on a board of wooden letter tiles. The goal is to use up all your tokens. The game is designed by Russell Ginns and published by Front Porch Classics.

== Gameplay ==
A dynamic word game designed for two players involves wooden letter tiles, each bearing four letters. The Discovery Edition comprises 28 tiles, while the Wooden Box edition contains 32 tiles. Initially, the board features 16 tiles, and additional ones are incorporated as the game progresses. During their turn, players discover words on the board, with a minimum length of three letters. Words may be arranged vertically, horizontally, or diagonally. Upon identifying a word, players utilise transparent tokens to highlight the letters within it.

As the game unfolds, the board expands beyond the initial 4 x 4 layout. Players acquire new letter tiles, integrating them into the evolving word search field. The victory goes to the first player who exhausts all their tokens.
