= Large Animal Games =

American video game developer (2001–2014)

- Company type: Privately held
- Industry: Online/Video Games Developer/Distributor
- Founded: February 2001
- Defunct: February 2014
- Headquarters: 115 W. 29th St., 11th floor; New York, NY 10001, New York City, USA
- Key people: Wade Tinney, Josh Welber, Brad Macdonald
- Products: Games
- Website: www.largeanimal.com

Large Animal Games was an independent casual game developer, best known for their game Color Zen. The company was founded in New York City in 2001 by Wade Tinney and Josh Welber. Large Animal Games released over 100 games for a variety of different platforms until they announced that they were shutting down in March 2014.

== Mobile Games ==
- Bumper Stars
- Color Zen
- Color Zen Kids
- Character Cards
- PhotoBlitz
- Nomsters
- Bananagrams iPhone
- Bumperstars iPhone
- Fashion Solitaire
- Lucky Cruise Slots
- Universal Film Mogul
- Picturiffic
- Spartacus: Gods of the Arena
- Spartacus: Vengeance
- Office World
- Bananagram
- Bumper Stars
- Lucky Strike Lanes
