= List of songs in Green Day: Rock Band =

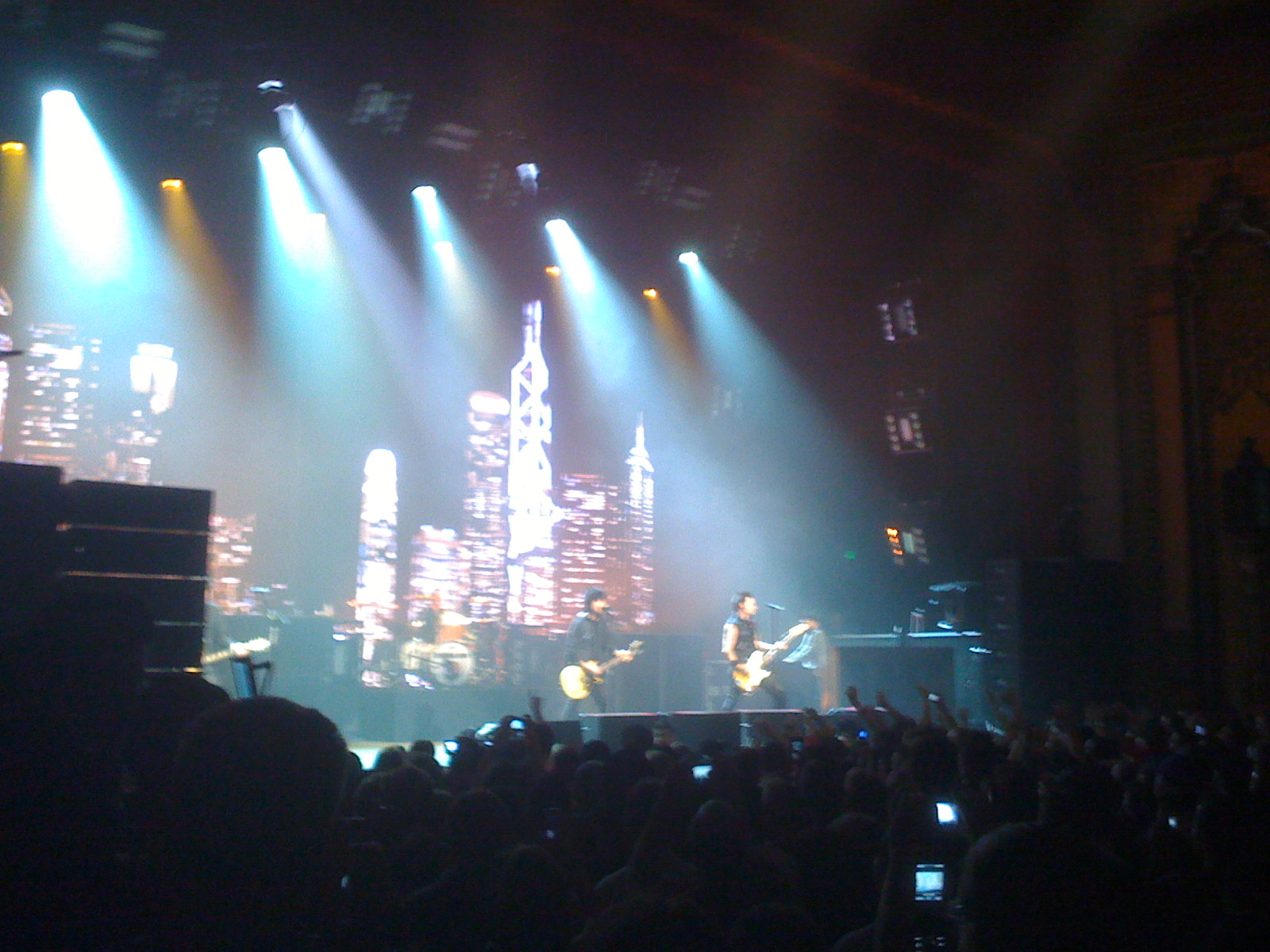
The Fox Theater in Oakland was recreated in Green Day: Rock Band as the venue where the 18 songs from 21st Century Breakdown are played.

Green Day: Rock Band is a 2010 music video game developed by Harmonix, published by MTV Games and distributed by Electronic Arts. The fifth major release in the Rock Band series, the game was released in June 2010 for the PlayStation 3, Xbox 360, and Wii. It allows one to six players to simulate the performance of songs by Green Day by providing the players with peripherals modeled after musical instruments. These include a guitar peripheral for lead guitar and bass gameplay, a drum kit peripheral, and up to three microphones using the same vocal harmony technology as The Beatles: Rock Band.

Green Day: Rock Band includes 44 playable tracks consisting of 47 Green Day songs. An additional 6 songs are available for all three consoles as downloadable content and for the Xbox 360 and PlayStation 3 as part of the special "Plus" edition of the game. With these downloadable songs, the complete albums of Dookie, American Idiot, and 21st Century Breakdown can be played, along with additional songs from Insomniac, Nimrod, and Warning. The song selection was criticized by some reviewers who felt that many important Green Day songs, especially from Insomniac, Nimrod, and Warning, were absent from the game. Others praised the inclusion of complete albums in the game and thought they were fun to play.

== Music selection ==
Green Day: Rock Band includes 47 songs by Green Day (six of which are arranged in three two-song medleys, making the final setlist 44 songs long), spanning their career from 1994 to 2009. It is the first Rock Band game to feature a complete album in the game as shipped, with the entirety of Dookie (except for the hidden track "All By Myself"), American Idiot, and 21st Century Breakdown playable. The inclusion of the album American Idiot was a key part of the setlist, according to Harmonix's Chris Foster, due to the nature of the album (which is meant to be listened to as a whole), as well as the album's success and stage adaptation. This led the team to also include 21st Century Breakdown, an album similar to American Idiot in that it is meant to be heard as a complete work. Since Harmonix already released six songs from the album as downloadable content, they did not want to make those who purchased the songs pay for them again in the full game, and designed the game to include those songs for players who previously downloaded them. Once these two albums were selected, Harmonix's CEO Alex Rigopulos determined they needed to include the Dookie album, the major label debut of the band and one of the most requested albums by Rock Band fans, in order to complete the experience.

Harmonix wanted to include songs from Green Day's first two albums, 39/Smooth and Kerplunk, but they were unable to get the proper multitrack recordings. According to Tré Cool, the master tapes for the first two albums exist but are in poor condition, and the process to digitize them would destroy them. After deciding to make Green Day: Rock Band a "three-album game", Harmonix included additional hits from Insomniac, Nimrod, and Warning.

Green Day: Rock Band was announced in December 2009 with a teaser trailer which revealed the inclusion of the song "American Idiot". Another five songs (four playable tracks) were revealed at the 2010 Game Developers Conference: "Boulevard of Broken Dreams", "Brain Stew/Jaded" (a two-song medley), "Hitchin' a Ride", and "Wake Me Up When September Ends". On March 29, Kotaku found that the retailer Play.com listed the albums Dookie and American Idiot as being playable in the game, although Harmonix did not confirm the rumor. The full setlist was announced by Entertainment Weekly on April 9, 2010. The game was released on June 8.

== Main setlist ==
For Xbox 360 and PlayStation 3 owners, every song in Green Day: Rock Band can be exported for use within Rock Band, Rock Band 2, Lego Rock Band, and Rock Band 3. The Wii version can only export songs into Rock Band 3. Although Rock Band and Rock Band 2 do not support vocal harmonies, Rock Band 3 does and the exported Green Day tracks can be played with all vocal parts in that game. Only 11 of the songs, which are considered "family friendly", can be played in Lego Rock Band. Each song was also made available, as of November 13, 2012, as an individual download outside of this game, however these downloads will only work in Rock Band 3 and Rock Band Blitz. "Song of the Century", which serves as a prelude to the title track of 21st Century Breakdown, was made into a separate song, and is unique among the entire Rock Band catalog in which it is the series' only song a cappella, i.e. it only has a vocal track.

The following songs are included in the game's setlist:

Song title	Album	Venue and set	Year (Note: Year of song's original release, as listed in the game.)
"21st Century Breakdown"	21st Century Breakdown	The Fox Theater – Oakland: Set 3	2009
"American Eulogy"	21st Century Breakdown	The Fox Theater – Oakland: Set 2	2009
"American Idiot"	American Idiot	Milton Keynes: Set 2	2004
"Are We the Waiting/St. Jimmy" (Note: Track consists of two songs played back-to-back as a medley.)	American Idiot	Milton Keynes: Set 4	2004
"Before the Lobotomy"	21st Century Breakdown	The Fox Theater – Oakland: Set 2	2009
"Boulevard of Broken Dreams"	American Idiot	Milton Keynes: Set 1	2004
"Brain Stew/Jaded"	Insomniac	Milton Keynes: Set 4	1995
"Basket Case"	Dookie	The Warehouse: Set 2	1994
"Burnout"	Dookie	The Warehouse: Set 3	1994
"Chump"	Dookie	The Warehouse: Set 3	1994
"Coming Clean"	Dookie	The Warehouse: Set 2	1994
"Emenius Sleepus"	Dookie	The Warehouse: Set 2	1994
"Extraordinary Girl"	American Idiot	Milton Keynes: Set 1	2004
"F.O.D."	Dookie	The Warehouse: Set 1	1994
"Geek Stink Breath"	Insomniac	Milton Keynes: Set 1	1995
"Give Me Novacaine/She's A Rebel"	American Idiot	Milton Keynes: Set 3	2004
"Good Riddance (Time of Your Life)" (Note: Song has no Drum part.)	Nimrod	Milton Keynes: Set 4	1997
"Having a Blast"	Dookie	The Warehouse: Set 1	1994
"Hitchin' a Ride"	Nimrod	Milton Keynes: Set 3	1997
"Holiday"	American Idiot	Milton Keynes: Set 3	2004
"Homecoming"	American Idiot	Milton Keynes: Set 4	2004
"Horseshoes and Handgrenades"	21st Century Breakdown	The Fox Theater – Oakland: Set 3	2009
"In the End"	Dookie	The Warehouse: Set 3	1994
"Jesus of Suburbia"	American Idiot	Milton Keynes: Set 3	2004
"Last Night on Earth"	21st Century Breakdown	The Fox Theater – Oakland: Set 1	2009
"Letterbomb"	American Idiot	Milton Keynes: Set 3	2004
"Longview"	Dookie	The Warehouse: Set 3	1994
"Minority"	Warning	Milton Keynes: Set 2	2000
"Murder City"	21st Century Breakdown	The Fox Theater – Oakland: Set 2	2009
"Nice Guys Finish Last"	Nimrod	Milton Keynes: Set 2	1997
"Peacemaker"	21st Century Breakdown	The Fox Theater – Oakland: Set 3	2009
"Pulling Teeth"	Dookie	The Warehouse: Set 1	1994
"Restless Heart Syndrome"	21st Century Breakdown	The Fox Theater – Oakland: Set 1	2009
"Sassafras Roots"	Dookie	The Warehouse: Set 2	1994
"See the Light"	21st Century Breakdown	The Fox Theater – Oakland: Set 2	2009
"She"	Dookie	The Warehouse: Set 1	1994
"Song of the Century" (Note: Song has no Bass, Drum, or Guitar part.)	21st Century Breakdown	The Fox Theater – Oakland: Set 1	2009
"The Static Age"	21st Century Breakdown	The Fox Theater – Oakland: Set 3	2009
"¿Viva La Gloria? (Little Girl)"	21st Century Breakdown	The Fox Theater – Oakland: Set 1	2009
"Wake Me Up When September Ends"	American Idiot	Milton Keynes: Set 1	2004
"Warning"	Warning	Milton Keynes: Set 1	2000
"Welcome to Paradise"	Dookie	The Warehouse: Set 2	1994
"Whatsername"	American Idiot	Milton Keynes: Set 2	2004
"When I Come Around"	Dookie	The Warehouse: Set 1	1994

== Downloadable songs ==
In addition to the on-disc setlist, Green Day: Rock Band supports six Green Day songs previously released as downloadable content for the Rock Band platform. These songs, when played in Green Day: Rock Band, contain custom character animations, unlockables, and support the game's vocal harmonies. The special "Plus" edition of the game available for the Xbox 360 and PlayStation 3 also includes a coupon to download these songs. Following the announcement of the band's 2012-2013 album trilogy ¡Uno!, ¡Dos!, and ¡Tré!, it was announced that a DLC pack, called Green Day 03, would feature four songs from the existing game, as well as the song "Oh Love" from the album ¡Uno!. However this pack would only be available for Rock Band 3 and Rock Band Blitz and would not work with Green Day: Rock Band.

Downloadable songs compatible with Green Day: Rock Band
Song title	Album	Venue and set	Year	Release date	DLC Pack
"21 Guns"	21st Century Breakdown	The Fox Theater – Oakland: DLC	2009	Jul 9, 2009	Green Day 01
"Christian's Inferno"	21st Century Breakdown	The Fox Theater – Oakland: DLC	2009	Dec 15, 2009	Green Day 02
"East Jesus Nowhere"	21st Century Breakdown	The Fox Theater – Oakland: DLC	2009	Jul 9, 2009	Green Day 01
"Know Your Enemy"	21st Century Breakdown	The Fox Theater – Oakland: DLC	2009	Jul 9, 2009	Green Day 01
"Last of the American Girls"	21st Century Breakdown	The Fox Theater – Oakland: DLC	2009	Dec 15, 2009	Green Day 02
"¡Viva La Gloria!"	21st Century Breakdown	The Fox Theater – Oakland: DLC	2009	Dec 15, 2009	Green Day 02

Downloadable songs not compatible with Green Day: Rock Band
Song title	Album	Compatible games	Year	Release date	DLC pack
"Oh Love"	¡Uno!	Rock Band 3, Rock Band Blitz, Rock Band 4	2012	Sep 25, 2012	Green Day 03
"Still Breathing"	Revolution Radio	Rock Band 4	2016	Nov 22, 2016	Standalone
"Father of All..."	Father of All...	Rock Band 4	2020	Jan 9, 2020	Standalone

== Reception ==
Jack DeVries, who reviewed Green Day: Rock Band for IGN, enjoyed having complete albums in the game, but was disappointed by the low number of songs in the game, especially from the albums between Dookie and American Idiot, saying that "Nearly all of Green Day's albums went platinum and I'd like a much larger representation from all of them." Ars Technica's Ben Kuchera praised the selection of songs, saying they "fit with the gameplay of Rock Band very well". Some reviewers, such as GamePro's Mitch Dyer, were disappointed by the focus on Green Day's newer songs. Several reviewers were critical of the setlist, feeling that the songs were not fun to play or were too easy. Others praised the songs chosen, saying that songs such as "F.O.D." provide the game with musical variety, and that they are fun to play on all the instruments. Reviewers criticized the game's use of radio edits, with Kuchera calling the editing "a bummer". DeVries likewise felt that "given how much these boys love to drop f-bombs, [the editing] makes the songs sound funny."
