= International Superhits! =

Compilation album by Green Day

Greatest hits album by Green Day
- Released: November 13, 2001
- Recorded: 1993–2001
- Studio: Various
- Genres: Punk rock; pop-punk; power pop; alternative rock
- Length: 60:44
- Label: Reprise
- Producers: Rob Cavallo; Jerry Finn; Green Day

Green Day chronology
Tune In, Tokyo... (2001)	International Superhits! (2001)	Shenanigans (2002)

Singles from International Superhits!
- 1. "Poprocks & Coke" Released: January 1, 2002; 2. "Maria" Released: 2002

International Superhits! is the first greatest hits compilation by American rock band Green Day, released November 13, 2001, through Reprise Records. It collects all of the band's singles released between 1994 and 2000 as well as a rerecording of "Maria", a B-side from Waiting, and a previously unreleased track, "Poprocks & Coke". A DVD and VHS titled International Supervideos! was released simultaneously, collecting fifteen of the band's music videos spanning the same period. Both releases have been certified Platinum in the United States for sales of over 1 million copies and 3× Platinum in the United Kingdom for sales of 900,000.

== Reception ==
Professional ratings
Review scores
Source	Rating
AllMusic	5/5 stars
Drowned in Sound	8/10
Encyclopedia of Popular Music	4/5 stars
The Guardian	4/5 stars
NME	6/10
Rock Sound	4/5 stars
The Rolling Stone Album Guide	5/5 stars
Slant Magazine	4/5 stars
Under the Radar	9/10

Upon its release, International Superhits! charted in ten countries. The album peaked at No. 40 on the Billboard 200 in the United States and was a success in several other countries, peaking as high as No. 4 in Japan; the lowest peak in any country was in Germany at No. 67. It was certified Gold in Canada eight days after its release, for sales of over 50,000 units. It achieved Gold certification in the United States in January 2002 for sales of over 500,000, and went on to be certified Platinum in 2005 for sales of over 1 million. Also in 2005 it reached No. 1 on Billboard's Catalog Albums chart. It has also been certified 2× Platinum in the United Kingdom for sales of 852,000, and Triple Platinum in Australia for sales of over 210,000, bringing its worldwide sales to over 2,062,000.

Critic Stephen Thomas Erlewine gave the album a perfect five-star review, saying it "confirms that Green Day not only were popular and good, but they could have held their own against their idols" and that "distilled to their singles, Green Day sound fiercer than ever, and more musically vibrant". Sal Cinquemani of Slant Magazine rated it four stars out of five, remarking that "Time-tested hits like 'Basket Case', 'Brain Stew', and 'Hitchin' a Ride', along with soundtrack contributions 'J.A.R.' and 'Nice Guys Finish Last', heartily display Green Day's remarkable longevity. The album's new offering, 'Poprocks & Coke', dishes out more of the maturated, acoustic-filled folk-punk that began with 'Good Riddance (Time of Your Life)' and Warning ... The collection's only flaw is the omission of tracks representing the band's pre-fame days."

== Track listing ==
All lyrics are written by Billie Joe Armstrong, except where noted; all music is composed by Green Day (Billie Joe Armstrong, Mike Dirnt, and Tré Cool).

No.	Title	Album	Length
1.	"Maria" (featuring a portion of Billie Joe's first interview)	Re-recorded B-side from the 7" single of "Waiting", 2001	2:47
2.	"Poprocks & Coke"	Previously unreleased	2:38
3.	"Longview"	Dookie, 1994	3:53
4.	"Welcome to Paradise"	Dookie	3:44
5.	"Basket Case"	Dookie	3:01
6.	"When I Come Around"	Dookie	2:58
7.	"She"	Dookie	2:14
8.	"J.A.R. (Jason Andrew Relva)" (lyrics written by Mike Dirnt)	Dookie outtake, re-recorded for Angus soundtrack; non-album single, 1995	2:51
9.	"Geek Stink Breath"	Insomniac, 1995	2:15
10.	"Brain Stew"	Insomniac	3:13
11.	"Jaded"	Insomniac	1:30
12.	"Walking Contradiction"	Insomniac	2:31
13.	"Stuck with Me"	Insomniac	2:15
14.	"Hitchin' a Ride"	Nimrod, 1997	2:51
15.	"Good Riddance (Time of Your Life)"	Nimrod	2:33
16.	"Redundant"	Nimrod	3:18
17.	"Nice Guys Finish Last"	Nimrod	2:49
18.	"Minority"	Warning, 2000	2:47
19.	"Warning"	Warning	3:41
20.	"Waiting"	Warning	3:11
21.	"Macy's Day Parade"	Warning	3:33
Total length:			60:44

== Personnel ==
Green Day

- Billie Joe Armstrong – lead vocals, guitar, producer
- Mike Dirnt – bass guitar, backing vocals, producer; co-lead vocals on "J.A.R. (Jason Andrew Relva)"
- Tré Cool – drums, producer

Production

- Jerry Finn – producer, mix engineer
- Rob Cavallo – producer
- Joe McGrath – recording engineer

Artwork

- Chris Bilheimer – art direction
- Marina Chavez – photography

== Charts ==
=== Weekly charts ===
Weekly chart performance for International Superhits
Chart (2001)	Peak position
Australian Albums (ARIA)	11
Austrian Albums (Ö3 Austria)	48
Canadian Albums (Billboard)	18
German Albums (Offizielle Top 100)	67
Irish Albums (IRMA)	13
Italian Albums (FIMI)	17
Japanese Albums (Oricon)	4
New Zealand Albums (RMNZ)	5
Swiss Albums (Schweizer Hitparade)	61
UK Albums (Official Charts)	15
US Billboard 200	40

=== Year-end charts ===
2001 year-end chart performance for International Superhits!
Chart (2001)	Position
Australian Albums (ARIA)	73
UK Albums (OCC)	95

2002 year-end chart performance for International Superhits!
Chart (2002)	Position
Canadian Alternative Albums (Nielsen SoundScan)	93
US Billboard 200	136

2005 Annual sales performance for In Time: The Best of R.E.M. 1988–2003
Chart (2005)	Position
UK Albums (OCC)	83

== Certifications ==
Certifications and sales for International Superhits!
Region	Certification	Certified units/sales
Argentina (CAPIF)	Platinum	40,000^{^}
Australia (ARIA)	3× Platinum	210,000^{^}
Belgium (BRMA)	Gold	25,000^{*}
Brazil (Pro-Música Brasil)	Gold	50,000^{*}
Canada (Music Canada)	Gold	50,000^{^}
Ireland (IRMA)	3× Platinum	45,000^{^}
Japan (RIAJ)	2× Platinum	400,000^{^}
New Zealand (RMNZ)	Gold	7,500^{^}
United Kingdom (BPI)	3× Platinum	900,000^{‡}
United States (RIAA)	Platinum	1,000,000^{^}
Summaries
Europe (IFPI)	Platinum	1,000,000^{*}
^{*} Sales figures based on certification alone.^{^} Shipments figures based on certification alone.^{‡} Sales+streaming figures based on certification alone.

== International Supervideos! ==
International Supervideos!

Video by Green Day
- Released: November 13, 2001
- Recorded: 1994–2001
- Genres: Punk rock; pop punk; alternative rock
- Length: 49:27
- Labels: Warner Reprise Video, Reprise
- Producer: David May

Green Day chronology
International Supervideos! (2001)	Bullet in a Bible (2005)

Released the same day as International Superhits!, the International Supervideos! DVD and VHS collects fifteen of Green Day's music videos from 1994 to 2001. It does not include the video for "Welcome to Paradise" from this period. A video for Green Day's instrumental song, “Last Ride In”, is also included. To promote International Superhits! a video was filmed for the song "Macy's Day Parade", though it is not included on the DVD or VHS. International Supervideos! was certified Platinum in 2008 by the Recording Industry Association of America for sales of over 100,000 units.

=== Track listing ===
No.	Title	Director	Length
1.	"Longview" (from Dookie, January 1994)	Mark Kohr	3:52
2.	"Basket Case" (from Dookie, April 1994)	Kohr	3:12
3.	"When I Come Around" (from Dookie, November 1994)	Kohr	2:58
4.	"Geek Stink Breath" (from Insomniac, September 1995)	Kohr	2:23
5.	"Stuck with Me" (from Insomniac, November 1995)	Kohr	2:19
6.	"Brain Stew/Jaded" (from Insomniac, December 1995)	Kevin Kerslake	4:33
7.	"Walking Contradiction" (from Insomniac, April 1996)	Roman Coppola	2:37
8.	"Hitchin' a Ride" (from Nimrod, August 1997)	Kohr	2:53
9.	"Good Riddance (Time of Your Life)" (from Nimrod, November 1997)	Kohr	2:32
10.	"Redundant" (from Nimrod, March 1998)	Kohr	3:23
11.	"Nice Guys Finish Last" (from Nimrod, November 1998)	Evan Bernard	4:09
12.	"Last Ride In" (from Nimrod, September 1999)	Lance Bangs	3:52
13.	"Minority" (from Warning, August 2000)	Bernard	3:48
14.	"Warning" (from Warning, November 2000)	Francis Lawrence	2:51
15.	"Waiting" (from Warning, May 2001)	Marc Webb	3:17

=== Certifications ===
Region	Certification	Certified units/sales
Australia (ARIA)	Platinum	15,000^{^}
United States (RIAA)	Platinum	100,000^{^}
^{^} Shipments figures based on certification alone.
