= Tune In, Tokyo... =

EP by Green Day
- Released: October 9, 2001
- Recorded: March 2001
- Length: 33:10
- Labels: WEA, Reprise
- Producer: Green Day

Green Day chronology
| Warning (2000) | Tune In, Tokyo... (2001) | International Superhits! (2001) |

Tune In, Tokyo... is a live EP by the American rock band Green Day released exclusively in Japan in 2001. It was recorded during the tour of Warning in March 2001 in Fukuoka, Sendai, and Osaka, Japan.

== Release and reception ==
Tune In, Tokyo... is the fourth live EP by Green Day and was released on October 9, 2001. It charted for five weeks in Japan, reaching as high as number 29 on the album chart. Track 7 can also be heard on the "Waiting" single.

Tune In, Tokyo... was released worldwide for the first time on November 28, 2014, as a part of Black Friday Record Store Day on translucent blue vinyl and was limited to a pressing of only 5,000. This pressing included an MP3 download of the album.

== Charts ==
| Chart | Peak position |
|---|---|
| Japan Albums Chart | 29 |

== Track listing ==
Every track is from Warning, except for "King for a Day", which is on Nimrod.

All lyrics are written by Billie Joe Armstrong; all music is composed by Green Day.

| No. | Title | Length |
|---|---|---|
| 1. | "Church on Sunday" | 3:51 |
| 2. | "Castaway" | 5:21 |
| 3. | "Blood, Sex and Booze" | 3:40 |
| 4. | "King for a Day" | 4:57 |
| 5. | "Waiting" | 4:13 |
| 6. | "Minority" | 6:44 |
| 7. | "Macy's Day Parade" | 4:24 |
| Total length: | | 33:10 |

=== Notes ===
- Track 1 was recorded in Fukuoka on March 22, 2001.
- Tracks 2, 3, 5, 6, and 7 were recorded in Sendai on March 16, 2001.
- Track 4 was recorded in Osaka on March 13, 2001.

== Personnel ==
Band

- Billie Joe Armstrong – lead vocals, guitar
- Mike Dirnt – bass, backing vocals
- Tré Cool – drums

Additional musicians

- Jason White – guitar
- Gabrial McNair – trombone
- Kurt Lohmiller – trumpet

Production

- Kevin Lemoine – engineer
- Chris Bilheimer – art direction, photography
- Chris Lord-Alge – mixing
- Green Day – producer
