= Warning (Green Day song) =

2000 single by Green Day

Single by Green Day

from the album Warning
- B-side: "Scumbag"; "Outsider"
- Released: December 11, 2000
- Genre: Acoustic rock; pop rock
- Length: 3:41
- Label: Adeline; Reprise
- Composer: Green Day
- Lyricist: Billie Joe Armstrong
- Producer: Green Day

Green Day singles chronology
"Minority" (2000)	"Warning" (2000)	"Waiting" (2001)

Music video
- "Warning" on YouTube

"Warning" is a song by American rock band Green Day. It is the second single and title track from their sixth album of the same name. The song was a number-three modern-rock hit in the United States. The song also peaked at No. 27 on the UK Singles Chart, and No. 1 on the UK Rock & Metal Singles Chart.

== Composition ==
The main guitar riff of "Warning" has been compared to the Kinks' song "Picture Book".

== Music video ==
The music video for "Warning" premiered on MTV in January 2001. It was directed by Francis Lawrence and shows the life of a rather oblivious young man who does dangerous, socially unacceptable and trivial things during his day. His punch-in card reveals his name to be John Earle.

== Live performances ==
Despite being included in the band's greatest hits albums International Superhits! and God's Favorite Band, as well as appearing as a playable track in the video game Green Day: Rock Band, the band did not perform the song live for 21 years since 2001, until it was performed during a warm-up show before their performance at the 2022 Lollapalooza.

== Track listings ==
US 7-inch single

A1. "Warning"
B1. "Scumbag"
B2. "Outsider"

UK CD1

1. "Warning" (album version) – 3:42
2. "Scumbag" – 1:44
3. "I Don't Want to Know If You Are Lonely" – 3:08

UK CD2

1. "Warning" (album version) – 3:42
2. "Outsider" – 2:17
3. "Suffocate" – 2:57

UK 7-inch single

A. "Warning" (album version) – 3:42
B. "Suffocate"

Australian CD single

1. "Warning" – 3:42
2. "Minority" (album version)
3. "Scumbag" – 1:44
4. "Outsider" – 2:17

Japanese CD single

1. "Warning" – 3:42
2. "Scumbag" – 1:44
3. "Outsider" – 2:17
4. "I Don't Want to Know If You Are Lonely" – 3:08

== Charts ==
=== Weekly charts ===
Weekly chart performance for "Warning"
Chart (2000–2001)	Peak position
Australia (ARIA)	19
Canada (BDS)	54
Ireland (IRMA)	46
Italy (FIMI)	49
New Zealand (Recorded Music NZ)	37
Poland (PiF PaF)	12
Scotland Singles (OCC)	23
UK Singles (OCC)	27
UK Rock & Metal (OCC)	1
US Bubbling Under Hot 100 (Billboard)	14
US Adult Alternative Airplay (Billboard)	7
US Adult Pop Airplay (Billboard)	31
US Alternative Airplay (Billboard)	3
US Mainstream Rock (Billboard)	24

=== Year-end charts ===
Year-end chart performance for "Warning"
Chart (2001)	Position
US Modern Rock Tracks (Billboard)	30
US Triple-A (Billboard)	48

== Release history ==
Release dates and formats for "Warning"
Region	Date	Format(s)	Label(s)	Ref.
United States	December 5, 2000	Active rock radio	Reprise	
United Kingdom	December 11, 2000	7-inch vinyl; CD	Reprise	
Japan	December 20, 2000	CD	Reprise	
Australia	January 15, 2001	CD	Reprise	
United States	February 12, 2001	Hot adult contemporary radio	Reprise	
United States	February 13, 2001	Contemporary hit radio	Reprise	
