= Warning (Green Day album) =

Studio album by Green Day
- Released: October 3, 2000
- Recorded: January–May 2000
- Studio: Studio 880, Oakland, California
- Genres: Pop-punk; power pop; folk punk; pop rock; alternative rock
- Length: 41:14
- Label: Reprise
- Producer: Green Day

Green Day chronology
| Nimrod (1997) | Warning (2000) | Tune In, Tokyo... (2001) |

Green Day studio chronology
| Nimrod (1997) | Warning (2000) | American Idiot (2004) |

Singles from Warning
- 1. "Minority" Released: August 22, 2000; 2. "Warning" Released: December 11, 2000; 3. "Waiting" Released: May 29, 2001

Warning is the sixth studio album by the American rock band Green Day, released on October 3, 2000, by Reprise Records. Building upon its predecessor Nimrod (1997), it eschewed the band's trademark punk rock sound and incorporated acoustic elements and pop and folk styles. Lyrically, the album contains more optimistic and inspirational themes in comparison to the band's earlier releases. Warning was also Green Day's first album since Kerplunk (1991) not to be produced by Rob Cavallo, although he did have a hand in its production and was credited as executive producer.

Despite mixed opinions about the band's stylistic change, the album received mostly positive reviews from critics, who praised vocalist/guitarist Billie Joe Armstrong's songwriting. It peaked at number four on the US Billboard 200, and was certified gold by the Recording Industry Association of America, and has sold over 1.2 million copies as of 2012. Worldwide, it has sold 3.5 million copies.

== Background ==
After taking a break from touring in promotion of the band's fourth album Insomniac (1995), Green Day recorded the more experimental Nimrod (1997). The record, which delved into a wider variety of genres including punk, folk, power pop, hardcore punk, ska, and surf, featured the unprecedented acoustic hit "Good Riddance (Time of Your Life)". Vocalist/guitarist Billie Joe Armstrong recalled that the song's stylistic departure from the group's earlier work made him anxious about the song's release: "I was scared for that song to come out...because it was such a vulnerable song, to put that song out and it was like which way will it end up going? It was really exciting and it kind of sparked more in us as songwriters to expand on that."

The band embarked on the Nimrod promotional tour, which largely featured more intimate shows with audiences of 1,500 to 3,000 people. By the end of the tour, the band noted that its audience had evolved. 924 Gilman Street, the punk club in the band's hometown that had once banned Green Day after the group signed with a major label, booked bassist Mike Dirnt's side project the Frustrators for a show. Dirnt described the experience as "a wonderful piece of closure". Punk rock music was no longer popular in the mainstream because nu metal acts such as Korn, Limp Bizkit, and System Of A Down were experiencing success. According to Studio 880 owner John Lucasey, the band was "definitely at a very big crossroads".

== Recording ==
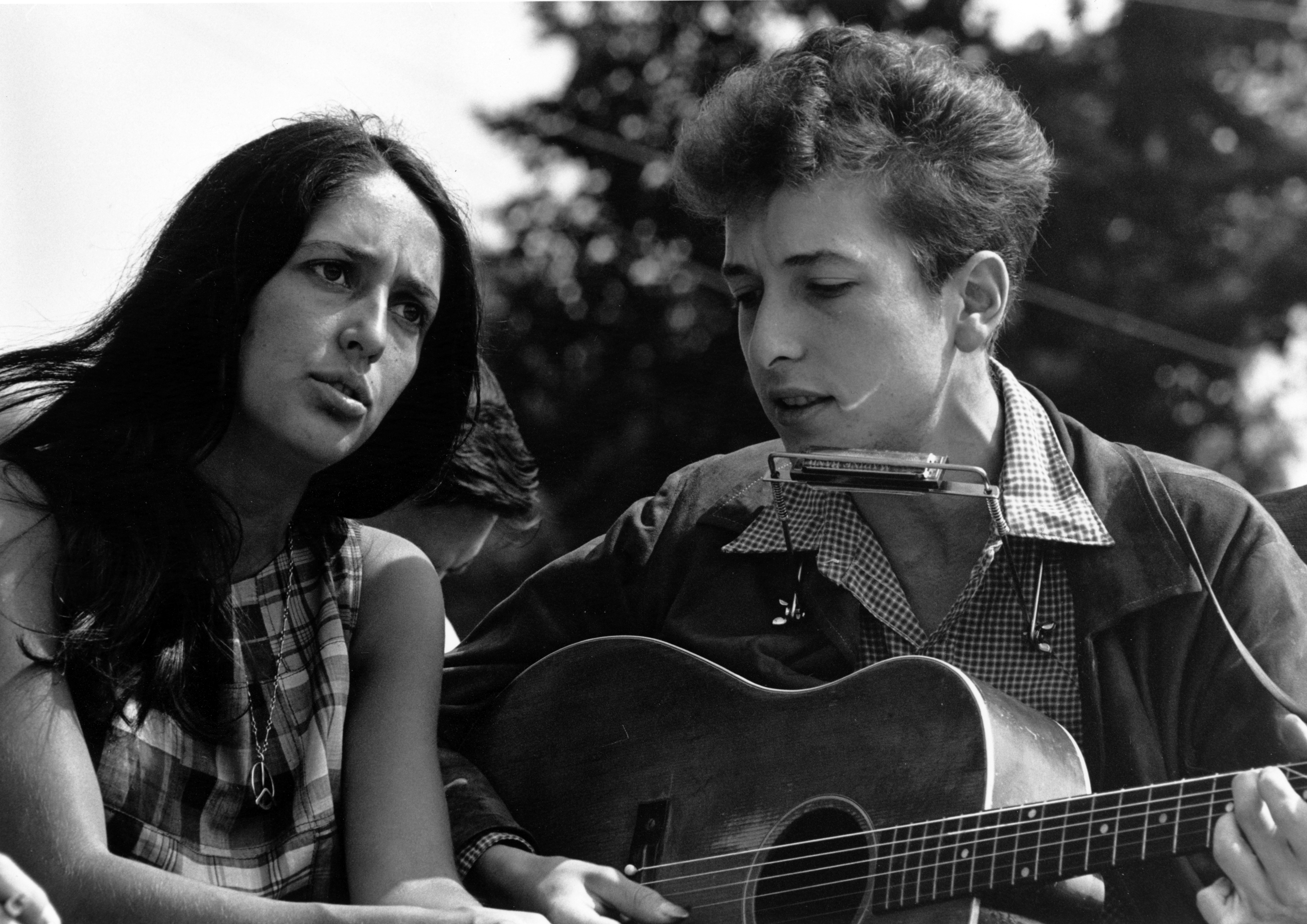
The music of Bob Dylan (right) was a major influence on the band during the writing and recording of Warning.

For Warning, Green Day initially opted to work with a producer other than Rob Cavallo, who had handled the production of the band's previous three albums. The group selected Scott Litt, who had previously worked with Nirvana and R.E.M. However, the band had disagreements with Litt over the album's musical direction; vocalist/guitarist Billie Joe Armstrong recalled that "It just didn't work out. He was really cool, but for that particular project, it just wasn't the right chemistry." The group subsequently brought Cavallo back in, but this time the band handled most of the production duties, with Cavallo instead serving as "executive producer". During the album's writing and early recording sessions, Armstrong repeatedly listened to Bob Dylan's 1965 record Bringing It All Back Home, which had a major influence over both Warning's musical experimentation and socially conscious lyrics.

The band began work on the album two years before entering the studio to record on April 1, 2000. During this period, the group members met five days a week to write new songs and rehearse old ones, with Tré Cool observing, "We've been practicing and writing songs and playing them and playing them and writing new songs and playing them and playing them... People think we're off in Hawaii kicking back and shit, but we're in Oakland playing our jams." The album was recorded at Studio 880 in Oakland. Cool noted of the band's work ethic in the studio, "We're not really sprinting. We're working at the same pace, but it's a pretty fast pace for recording. We're faster than every other band, pretty much. That's what I've been told." With the record, the band aimed to construct a solid list of tracks where "each song could be its own album". The group also made sure to make each song "well thought out and well placed" with regard to the album's tracklisting.

== Music and lyrics ==
"Warning"
The album's title track exemplifies Warning's "percussive acoustic" sound. It contains layered vocals and a "circling" riff which is a musical quotation from "Picture Book" by the Kinks.

"Misery"
The sixth track from the record, "Misery" features "mariachi brass" instrumentation, as well as strings, accordions, and acoustic guitar.

With Warning, the band experimented with more acoustic guitars, and strove for a "not sappy acoustic... more aggressive, percussive acoustic" sound. Cool and bassist Mike Dirnt also emphasized "deeper" grooves on the record. The title track, a "densely produced blast of layered vocals [and] strummed acoustic guitars", features a "circling bass riff" similar to that of "Picture Book" by the Kinks. "Waiting", which has been categorized as a "retro-pop lament", is based on the riff from Petula Clark's 1964 song "Downtown". Its melody has also been stylistically compared to the Mamas & the Papas and Kiss. Ken Tucker of Entertainment Weekly felt that "Misery" is "probably Billie Joe's idea of a Brecht-Weill pop operetta." It features "mariachi brass" instrumentation, as well as strings, accordions, and acoustic guitar. The song's five-minute length has been called "an epic by Green Day standards". The use of a harmonica on "Hold On" has been compared to the Beatles' "Love Me Do" and "I Should Have Known Better". "Macy's Day Parade" contains elements of folk and pop.

The album features more positive and uplifting lyrics in comparison with Green Day's earlier work. Cool noted that, "It's got the sarcasm, it's got the snottiness, but it's got a little light at the end of the tunnel." Warning also contains more explicitly political themes, as exemplified by tracks such as "Minority". This was inspired by Armstrong's fear that presidential nominee Al Gore was going to lose the 2000 U.S. presidential election and that "someone really conservative" would take office. He recalled, "We've always tried to keep an ear to the ground and keep our eyes open to what's going on...that's one reason why I was really taking my time writing songs to really [make an impact]. Instead of just writing an overly knee-jerk reaction." According to Sal Cinquemani of Slant Magazine, the lyrics of "Minority" serve as "a reminder of the youthful mentality of Green Day's early work". "Misery" tells various stories in its verses, all of which end unhappily. The first verse centers on a girl named Virginia who was a "lot lizard", a term for a prostitute who exchanges sex for money with truck drivers at interstate highway truck stops. "Blood, Sex and Booze" explores the subject of sadomasochism. "Church On Sunday" features lyrics in its pre-chorus that were originally written for the Nimrod demo "Black Eyeliner", which didn't see an official release until 2023.

According to some publications, such as LA Times, The Buffalo News, Sun-Sentinel, and Music Box Magazine Green Day departs from their punk rock sound with this album. Despite this, some other publications label the album as punk rock. In addition, the album has also been cited as pop-punk, power pop, folk punk, pop rock, and alternative rock.

== Release ==
=== Commercial performance ===
Warning peaked at number four on the Billboard 200, remaining on the chart for 25 weeks and it sold 156,000 copies on its first week according to Billboard. On December 1, 2000, the record was certified gold by Recording Industry Association of America (RIAA), for shipments of over 500,000 copies. In Canada, the record reached the number two position and stayed on the chart for five weeks. On August 1, 2001, the album was certified platinum by the Canadian Recording Industry Association for shipments of over 100,000 units. Warning also reached the top ten in multiple countries outside of North America, including Australia, Italy, and the United Kingdom. The album was later certified platinum by the Australian Recording Industry Association (ARIA) for shipments of over 70,000 copies. As of December 20, 2012, Warning has sold 1.2 million copies, according to Nielsen SoundScan.

=== Critical reception ===
Professional ratings
Aggregate scores
| Source | Rating |
|---|---|
| Metacritic | 72/100 |
Review scores
| Source | Rating |
| AllMusic | 4.5/5 stars |
| Entertainment Weekly | B+ |
| Los Angeles Times | 2.5/4 stars |
| Melody Maker | 3.5/5 stars |
| NME | 5/10 |
| Rolling Stone | 3/5 stars |
| The Rolling Stone Album Guide | 4/5 stars |
| Slant Magazine | 3/5 stars |
| Spin | 6/10 |
| The Village Voice | A− |

Warning received generally positive reviews from music critics. At Metacritic, which assigns a normalised rating out of 100 to reviews from mainstream critics, the album received an average score of 72 based on 19 reviews, which indicates "generally favorable reviews". Entertainment Weekly's Ken Tucker perceived a maturity in the album's lyrical content and called its music "as peppy as any Green Day have recorded". Charlotte Robinson of PopMatters commended Billie Joe Armstrong's lyrics and noted the band for embracing "the pop bent that has always been a part of their sound". The A.V. Club's Stephen Thompson stated "Green Day has never made a record so slick and musically mature". Los Angeles Times writer Natalie Nichols wrote that the album "reveal[s] them shaking off the transitional aspects of 1997's 'Nimrod' to craft a more coherent, less aggressive but still rebellious collection that also draws on the even older pop traditions of Bob Dylan, the Beatles and the Who". "Metal" Mike Saunders of The Village Voice viewed Warning as the band's best work and compared its music to that of the Beatles' Rubber Soul (1965). In his consumer guide for The Village Voice, critic Robert Christgau gave the album an A− rating, indicating "the kind of garden-variety good record that is the great luxury of musical micromarketing and overproduction. Anyone open to its aesthetic will enjoy more than half its tracks". Christgau noted "professionalism, craft, artistic growth" rather than maturity in Armstrong's songwriting and elaborated on his change in musical direction, stating:

He's abandoning the first person. He's assuming fictional personas. And he's creating for himself the voice of a thinking left-liberal who 'want[s] to be the minority' and cautions against caution itself--a voice that scolds rather than whines, a nice age-appropriate shift. Crucially, his knack for simple punk tunes remains unchanged; also crucially, these do fine at moderate tempos, and one even gives off a whiff of Brecht-Weill.

By contrast, NME's Andy Capper was ambivalent towards the band's "less electric, more organic sound" and stated "Older. More Mature. 'Warning' is the sound of a band losing its way". Greg Kot of Rolling Stone wrote that Armstrong "can't muster the same excitement for his more mature themes" and stated "Who wants to listen to songs of faith, hope and social commentary from what used to be snot-core's biggest-selling band?". Spin writer Jesse Berrett stated "these maturity moves buoy muzzy be-yourselfism ... Nor does everything in the stylistic grab bag fit", but concluded by complimenting Armstrong's "earnestly good-hearted" lyrics and wrote that "this album is after... evidence that even the snottiest deserve grace and the chance to age into warmth". Q gave the album three out of five stars and described it as "Hugely likeable, terribly noisy and cute, as well as being jammed with proper pop songs". Neal Weiss of Yahoo! Music called the album "crafty pop-rock" and stated "Some might wish Green Day never decided to grow up like this, but others might consider it a starting point to take the band seriously". Slant Magazine editor Sal Cinquemani perceived elements of folk and "pop sensibilities", writing that the album "displays just how well Green Day can construct pop songs".

=== Retrospect ===
Writing in 2009 with regard to Warning's lackluster commercial performance, James Montgomery of MTV News called the record "unjustly overlooked" and applauded Armstrong's "super strong" songwriting on the album. In The New Rolling Stone Album Guide (2004), Rolling Stone journalist Nick Catucci gave the album four out of five stars and wrote that the band "fully focus on the textures that have always differentiated their sturdy grooves and simple melodies". Catucci called the songs "speedy, neatly packaged reinterpretations of pop-rock history, from the Beatles to Creedence Clearwater Revival to the Ramones themselves". AllMusic editor Stephen Thomas Erlewine called it "gleeful, unabashed fun" and complimented Green Day for "embracing their fondness for pop and making the best damn album they'd ever made". Erlewine expressed that the band displays "melodic ingenuity and imaginative arrangements" and elaborated on its musical significance, stating "Warning may not be an innovative record per se, but it's tremendously satisfying; it finds the band at a peak of songcraft and performance, doing it all without a trace of self-consciousness. It's the first great pure pop album of the new millennium". Dom Passantino of Stylus Magazine cited it as "the most influential album on the British pop landscape since 1996 (Spice, naturally)", noting it as a significant influence on "the two biggest bands in the UK at the moment, and indeed for the past few years, Busted and McFly". Passantino called Warning "a great album" and viewed that Green Day "seemed to be bored with their genre-medium, but simultaneously knowledgeable that any attempt to boundary-hop will end with them falling on their face".

== Promotion ==
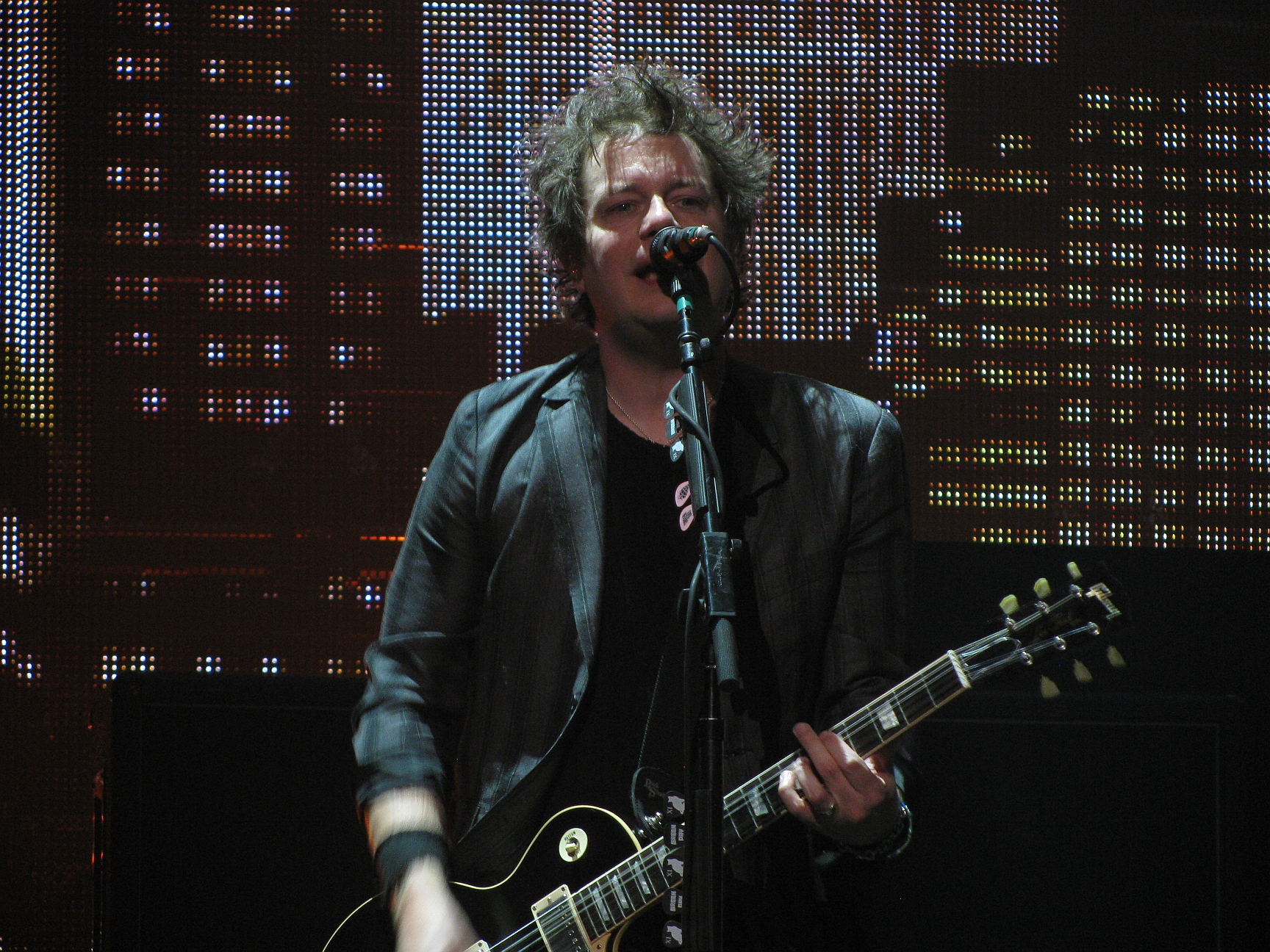
Green Day recruited touring guitarist Jason White to perform with the band on the 2000 Vans Warped Tour.

While Green Day was nearing completion of Warning, the band announced it would be performing on the 2000 Vans Warped Tour during the summer before the album's October release. Although the group had been invited to perform on the tour before, they were unable to because of scheduling conflicts. Because of Green Day's new stylistic change displayed on Warning, the band was considered an unconventional choice for the tour. Jason White, guitarist for Armstrong's side project Pinhead Gunpowder, was recruited to perform with the band to add "more power" to the group's sound; White observed that "Even I was like, 'Why are Green Day on the Warped Tour?'". Fat Mike of NOFX recalled, "They were the biggest band on the tour but it wasn't by far. Green Day weren't super popular at that time. I think they did the Warped tour because they wanted to get popular again." He also went on to call Warning "probably their worst album, I think. It's what happens, the ups and downs." However, Joel Madden of Good Charlotte, whose 2002 release The Young and the Hopeless outsold Warning, opined that "I was definitely aware that our record at the time sold more maybe than their record but I think we idolized them so much that it didn't matter. We thought Warning was one of their best records."

In January 2001, Colin Merry of the English rock band Other Garden filed a breach of copyright lawsuit against Green Day, claiming that the album's title track is a "reworked" version of his band's 1992 song "Never Got the Chance". Merry noted that despite both songs' similarity to the riff of "Picture Book" by the Kinks, the similarity between "Warning" and "Never Got the Chance" was more "striking". Green Day denied the accusations, and although Merry requested to halt all royalties from "Warning", the lawsuit was later dropped.

Green Day also co-headlined a "shared bill" with fellow Californian pop-punk band Blink-182 on the Pop Disaster Tour from April to June 2002. Armstrong explained Green Day's desire to perform on the tour by stating, "We really wanted to be part of an event. We figured putting the two biggest pop punk bands on the planet together was definitely going to be an event." In his book Nobody Likes You: Inside the Turbulent Life, Times and Music of Green Day, author Marc Spitz likened Blink-182 headlining a tour with Green Day to "Frank Sinatra, Jr. headlining over Frank Sinatra."

=== 25th anniversary edition ===
On October 3, 2025, the 25th anniversary of the album's original release, Green Day announced Warning (25th Anniversary Deluxe Edition), an expanded reissue scheduled for November 14, 2025. The announcement was accompanied by the release of a demo of "Castaway" as a promotional single. The edition comprises 49 songs and was issued as a five-LP or four-CD box set, as well as on digital platforms. The set contains a new remaster of the original twelve-track album, eight previously unreleased demos, and a disc of B-sides and rarities that includes two new mixes, "Otis Mix" versions of "Waiting" and "Macy's Day Parade". Several of the B-sides had previously appeared only on singles from the album's original run. The final two discs are a previously unreleased 21-song live recording of the band's March 18, 2001, concert at Makuhari Messe in Chiba, Japan. A live version of "Blood, Sex and Booze" from that concert, and "Waiting (Otis Mix)" were also released as promotional singles. The vinyl box set was pressed on Green Galaxy, Yellow Marble and Orange Galaxy vinyl and includes a 24-page booklet, a poster, a cloth patch, a button set and a sticker sheet, while the CD box set includes a 32-page book, a patch, buttons and a sticker. To mark the reissue, the official music videos for "Warning", "Waiting" and "Minority" were upscaled to 4K and posted to the band's YouTube channel.

== Track listing ==
All lyrics are written by Billie Joe Armstrong, except "Misery" by Green Day; all music is composed by Green Day.

| No. | Title | Length |
|---|---|---|
| 1. | "Warning" | 3:41 |
| 2. | "Blood, Sex and Booze" | 3:33 |
| 3. | "Church on Sunday" | 3:18 |
| 4. | "Fashion Victim" | 2:48 |
| 5. | "Castaway" | 3:52 |
| 6. | "Misery" | 5:05 |
| 7. | "Deadbeat Holiday" | 3:35 |
| 8. | "Hold On" | 2:56 |
| 9. | "Jackass" | 2:43 |
| 10. | "Waiting" | 3:12 |
| 11. | "Minority" | 2:48 |
| 12. | "Macy's Day Parade" | 3:33 |
| Total length: | | 41:09 |

Japanese and Australian version bonus tracks
| No. | Title | Length |
|---|---|---|
| 13. | "Brat" (Live at the Marumi Arena, Tokyo, Japan; January 27, 1996) | 1:42 |
| 14. | "86" (Live at the Sporthalle, Prague, Czech Republic; March 26, 1996, also in special edition UK version) | 3:01 |
| Total length: | | 45:57 |

=== 25th Anniversary Deluxe Edition ===
All tracks are written by Green Day, except were noted.

Disc 2: Demos, B-Sides & Rarities
| No. | Title | Length |
|---|---|---|
| 1. | "Blood, Sex and Booze" (Demo) | 3:06 |
| 2. | "Church On Sunday" (Demo) | 3:09 |
| 3. | "Fashion Victim" (Demo) | 2:40 |
| 4. | "Castaway" (Demo) | 3:43 |
| 5. | "Misery" (Demo) | 4:00 |
| 6. | "Deadbeat Holiday" (Demo) | 3:27 |
| 7. | "Jackass" (Demo) | 2:36 |
| 8. | "Macy's Day Parade" (Demo) | 3:25 |
| 9. | "Waiting" (Otis Mix) | 3:21 |
| 10. | "Macy's Day Parade" (Otis Mix) | 3:18 |
| 11. | "Outsider" (written by Dee Dee Ramone; originally performed by the Ramones) | 2:17 |
| 12. | "Scumbag" (lyrics written by Mike Dirnt) | 1:46 |
| 13. | "Don't Want to Know If You Are Lonely" (written by Grant Hart; originally performed by Hüsker Dü) | 3:07 |
| 14. | "Suffocate" | 2:54 |
| 15. | "Maria (Early Version)" | 2:33 |
| 16. | "Poprocks & Coke" | 2:40 |
| Total length: | | 48:00 |

Disc 3&4: Live At Makuhari Messe, Tokyo, Japan, March 18, 2001
| No. | Title | Length |
|---|---|---|
| 1. | "Nice Guys Finish Last" | 3:36 |
| 2. | "Castaway" | 5:25 |
| 3. | "Blood, Sex and Booze" | 3:26 |
| 4. | "Geek Stink Breath" | 2:00 |
| 5. | "Longview" | 3:54 |
| 6. | "Welcome to Paradise" | 4:31 |
| 7. | "Hitchin' a Ride" | 7:02 |
| 8. | "Brain Stew" | 3:11 |
| 9. | "Jaded" | 3:00 |
| 10. | "Basket Case" | 2:50 |
| 11. | "She" | 2:30 |
| 12. | "King For a Day" | 4:23 |
| 13. | "F.O.D." | 3:14 |
| 14. | "2000 Light Years Away" | 4:50 |
| 15. | "Knowledge" (Originally performed by Operation Ivy) | 11:07 |
| 16. | "Minority" | 10:01 |
| 17. | "Good Riddance (Time of Your Life)" | 2:38 |
| 18. | "Warning" | 7:50 |
| 19. | "Platypus (I Hate You)" | 5:27 |
| 20. | "Waiting" | 6:39 |
| 21. | "Macy's Day Parade" | 4:16 |
| Total length: | | 101:50 |

== Personnel ==
Credits for Warning adapted from liner notes.

=== Musicians ===
Green Day

- Billie Joe Armstrong – vocals, guitars, mandolin, harmonica
- Mike Dirnt – bass, vocals, Farfisa on "Misery"
- Tré Cool – drums, percussion, accordion

Additional musicians

- Benmont Tench – additional musician on "Church on Sunday"
- Gary Meek – saxophone on "Jackass"
- David Campbell – string arrangements
- Mistress Simone – dominatrix

=== Production ===
- Green Day – producers
- Cheryl Jenets – production coordination
- Jack Joseph Puig – mixing at Oceanway, Hollywood
- Ken Allardyce – engineer
- Josh "Tone" Weaver – additional engineer
- Richard Ash – additional engineer
- Tal Herzberg – G3 operator
- Kenny Butler – drum technician
- Timmy Chunks – guitar technician
- Bill Schneider – guitar and bass technician
- Ted Jensen – mastering at Sterling Sound
- Rob Cavallo – executive producer
- Cheryl Jenets – production coordinator
- Marina Chavez, Lance Bangs – photography
- Chris Bilheimer – additional photography, art direction

== Charts ==
=== Weekly charts ===
Weekly chart performance for Warning
| Chart (2000) | Peak position |
|---|---|
| Australian Albums (ARIA) | 7 |
| Austrian Albums (Ö3 Austria) | 14 |
| Canadian Albums (Billboard) | 2 |
| Dutch Albums (Album Top 100) | 84 |
| Europe (European Top 100 Albums) | 8 |
| French Albums (SNEP) | 58 |
| German Albums (Offizielle Top 100) | 21 |
| Hungarian Albums (MAHASZ) | 23 |
| Irish Albums (IRMA) | 13 |
| Italian Albums (FIMI) | 8 |
| Japanese Albums (Oricon) | 2 |
| New Zealand Albums (RMNZ) | 20 |
| Scottish Albums (Official Charts) | 4 |
| Spanish Albums (PROMUSICAE) | 25 |
| Swedish Albums (Sverigetopplistan) | 20 |
| Swiss Albums (Schweizer Hitparade) | 11 |
| UK Albums (Official Charts) | 4 |
| US Billboard 200 | 4 |

=== Year-end charts ===
2000 year-end chart performance for Warning
| Chart (2000) | Position |
|---|---|
| Australian Albums (ARIA) | 80 |
| Canadian Albums (Nielsen SoundScan) | 78 |

2001 year-end chart performance for Warning
| Chart (2001) | Position |
|---|---|
| US Billboard 200 | 197 |

== Certifications and sales ==
Certifications and sales for Warning
| Region | Certification | Certified units/sales |
|---|---|---|
| Australia (ARIA) | Platinum | 70,000^{^} |
| Canada (Music Canada) | Platinum | 100,000^{^} |
| Italy (FIMI) | Platinum | 100,000^{*} |
| Japan (RIAJ) | Platinum | 200,000^{^} |
| New Zealand (RMNZ) | Gold | 7,500^{‡} |
| Sweden | — | 9,000 |
| United Kingdom (BPI) | Platinum | 300,000^{‡} |
| United States (RIAA) | Gold | 1,200,000 |
^{*} Sales figures based on certification alone.^{^} Shipments figures based on certification alone.^{‡} Sales+streaming figures based on certification alone.
