= J.A.R. =

1995 promotional single by Green Day

"J.A.R. (Jason Andrew Relva)"
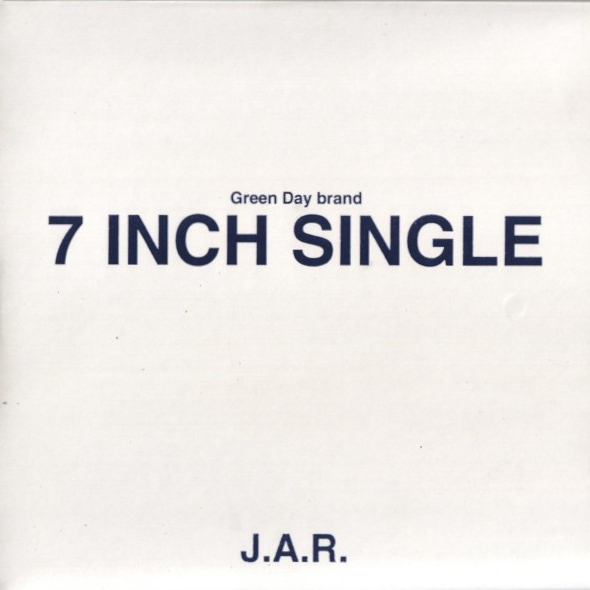

Promotional single by Green Day

from the album Angus: Music from the Motion Picture and International Superhits!
- Released: August 1, 1995
- Genre: Punk rock
- Length: 2:51
- Label: Reprise
- Composer: Green Day
- Lyricist: Mike Dirnt
- Producers: Rob Cavallo; Green Day

Green Day singles chronology
"When I Come Around" (1995)	"J.A.R. (Jason Andrew Relva)" (1995)	"Geek Stink Breath" (1995)

Audio
- "J.A.R. (Jason Andrew Relva)" on YouTube

"J.A.R." (alternatively titled "J.A.R. (Jason Andrew Relva)") is a song by the American rock band Green Day. Written by bassist Mike Dirnt about a friend who committed suicide in a car crash, the song was a previously unreleased track from the Dookie sessions but it was later featured on the soundtrack to the movie Angus in 1995. In August 1995, the song reached number one on the Billboard Modern Rock Tracks chart and spent 16 weeks on it. The song peaked at number 22 on the Hot 100 Airplay chart. The song was featured as the eighth track on Green Day's 2001 greatest hits collection International Superhits!, on their 2011 live album Awesome as Fuck, and on the 30th anniversary reissue of Dookie alongside a cassette demo of the song.

== Background ==
The acronym stands for Jason Andrew Relva, a childhood friend of Green Day bassist Mike Dirnt. Relva was born on November 16, 1972, and died at the age of 19 on April 18, 1992, as the result of injuries sustained from a car crash. Dirnt wrote the song in remembrance of him. Relva is thanked in the liner notes of 1,039/Smoothed Out Slappy Hours and Kerplunk.

== Reception ==
PopMatters listed "J.A.R." as the ninth-best Green Day song, commenting, "It's a winner in its own right, and in a sense, its bubbling bass, buzzing chord crashes, and Tre Cool's killer chorus drum beat is the Platonic ideal of a Green Day song."

Both Mark Hoppus of Blink-182 and Chris DeMakes of Less Than Jake rated "J.A.R." as their favorite Green Day song. Hoppus stated that the opening guitar riff of the Blink-182 song "What's My Age Again?" was created by him trying and failing to play the opening bass riff of "J.A.R." on his guitar.

== Track listing ==
Promo
No.	Title	Lyrics	Length
1.	"J.A.R. (Jason Andrew Relva)"	Mike Dirnt	2:51

== Charts ==
=== Weekly charts ===
Weekly chart performance for "J.A.R."
Chart (1995)	Peak position
US Radio Songs (Billboard)	22
US Alternative Airplay (Billboard)	1
US Mainstream Rock (Billboard)	17

=== Year-end charts ===
Year-end chart performance for "J.A.R."
Chart (1995)	Position
US Modern Rock Tracks (Billboard)	29
