= Waiting (Green Day song) =

2001 single by Green Day

Single by Green Day

from the album Warning
- B-side: "Maria"
- Released: March 12, 2001
- Studio: Studio 880 (Oakland, California)
- Genre: Power pop; pop-punk; rock and roll
- Length: 3:14
- Label: Reprise
- Composers: Green Day; Tony Hatch
- Lyricist: Billie Joe Armstrong
- Producer: Green Day

Green Day singles chronology
"Warning" (2000)	"Waiting" (2001)	"American Idiot" (2004)

Music video
- "Waiting" on YouTube

"Waiting" is a song by American rock band Green Day. It was released as the third single from their sixth album, Warning, on which the song appears as the 10th track. Serviced to US radio on March 12, 2001, the song peaked at number 26 on the US Billboard Modern Rock Tracks chart. The melody of the song has been compared to Petula Clark's "Downtown".

== Reception ==
The song was also well received by critics. NME, in its review, stated that "'Waiting', with its Mamas & Papas melody and its Kiss Army hook, could sit respectably alongside the band's best material." Slant called the song "instantly memorable".

== Music video ==
The video features Green Day playing in a house while a bunch of young adults are jumping around, breaking various items and having a party. For the majority of the video, the partygoers are in slow motion while the band is playing normally; eventually, the partygoers briefly freeze in time until the last part of the video when they return to normal. It was directed by Marc Webb.

== Track listings ==
CD

1. "Waiting" (album version) – 3:13
2. "Macy's Day Parade" (live) – 4:26
3. "Basket Case" (live) – 2:49
4. "Waiting" (Video) – 3:23
- Track 2 also available on ...Tune In, Tokyo.
- Track 3 also available on Bowling Bowling Bowling Parking Parking.

German CD

1. "Waiting" – 3:13
2. "She" (live in Japan) – 2:32
3. "F.O.D." (live in Japan) – 3:07

DVD single

1. "Waiting" (album version) – 3:13
2. "Waiting" (Video) – 3:23
3. 4 x video snippets: "Basket Case" / "Geek Stink Breath" / "Good Riddance (Time of Your Life)" / "Minority" – 2:30

7-inch single

A. "Waiting" – 3:13
B. "Maria" (early version) – 2:27

Vinyl box set version

A1. "Waiting" – 3:13
A2. "Macy's Day Parade" – 3:34
B1. "Fashion Victim" – 2:59
B2. "Castaway" – 4:01

== Charts ==
Weekly chart performance for "Waiting"
Chart (2001)	Peak position
Scotland Singles (OCC)	29
UK Singles (OCC)	34
UK Rock & Metal (OCC)	7
US Alternative Airplay (Billboard)	26

== Release history ==
Release dates and formats for "Waiting"
Region	Date	Format(s)	Label(s)	Ref.
United States	March 12, 2001	Modern rock radio	Reprise	
Australia	August 27, 2001	CD	Reprise	
Japan	September 12, 2001	CD	Reprise	
United Kingdom	October 29, 2001	CD; DVD	Reprise	
