= When I Come Around =

1995 single by Green Day

Single by Green Day

from the album Dookie
- B-side: "Coming Clean" (live); "She" (live)
- Released: December 1994
- Genre: Punk rock; pop-punk; alternative rock
- Length: 2:58
- Label: Reprise
- Composer: Green Day
- Lyricist: Billie Joe Armstrong
- Producers: Rob Cavallo; Green Day

Green Day singles chronology
"Welcome to Paradise" (1994)	"When I Come Around" (1994)	"J.A.R." (1995)

Music video
- "When I Come Around" on YouTube

"When I Come Around" is a song by American rock band Green Day. It is the 10th track on their third studio album, Dookie (1994), and was shipped to radio in December 1994 before being physically released as the fourth single from that album in January 1995 by Reprise Records. It was played live as early as 1992.

"When I Come Around" peaked at number six on the US Billboard Hot 100 Airplay chart, which ties it with "Wake Me Up When September Ends" as their second-highest song on this chart, behind only "Boulevard of Broken Dreams". It also topped the Billboard Modern Rock Tracks chart for seven weeks, and reached number two on the Billboard Album Rock Tracks chart. Worldwide, it became a top-10 hit in Australia, Canada, Iceland, and New Zealand. Mark Kohr directed the song's music video. As of August 2010, "When I Come Around" has sold 639,000 copies. This makes it the band's second best-selling single of the 1990s, behind their 1997 hit "Good Riddance (Time of Your Life)". In late 2023, for the 35th anniversary of Modern Rock Tracks (which by then had been renamed to Alternative Airplay), Billboard ranked the song as the 19th-most successful in the chart's history.

== Composition ==
The song is performed in 4/4 time and has a verse-chorus song structure. Most of the song is based around a sequence of four chords in the key of G flat major. Fred Thomas of AllMusic described the track as "a slacker punk answer to the power ballad".

== Critical reception ==
David Stubbs from Melody Maker felt the band is "threatening to get caught up in the tramlines of Rainbow's 'Since You've Been Gone' in the opening chords [of the song]". Pan-European magazine Music & Media commented, "We asked Nick Lowe, one-time producer in the first wave of punk, what's the difference between then and now? He answered: 'Green Day can really play.' Life is sometimes so simple." A reviewer from Music Week gave "When I Come Around" three out of five, writing, "The fourth track to be lifted from their gold-selling Dookie album lacks the character and charm of 'Basket Case' but shouldn't harm their chart fortunes if their US success is anything to go by." Sylvia Patterson from NME named it "their least frantic rouser to date [...] but nonetheless it's a mutant sun-ripe beef tomato of a pop guitar romp featuring the rhyming of "loser" with "user" and — heck! — "accuser" just like they were The Monkees." Also Leesa Daniels from Smash Hits gave it three out of five, saying, "This is much slower than 'Basket Case', but it's still got that really catchy hook-line."

== Music video ==
The music video for the song is directed by Mark Kohr. It shows the band walking to different places, like the Mission District, Broadway, and the BART Powell Street Station in San Francisco and Berkeley, California, at night, along with various scenes of people doing common things all inter-related. One of the first scenes of the video eventually leads back to the scene at the end. The band's touring guitarist Jason White can be seen in the video with his girlfriend.

Before the video was filmed, MTV aired a live performance of the song by the band at the 1994 Woodstock Festival. MTV's Ultimate Albums: Dookie special credited the simple horizontally-striped sweater worn by Armstrong in the video for starting a fashion trend of similar sweaters.

== Track listings ==
All lyrics are written by Billie Joe Armstrong; all music is composed by Green Day; except where noted.

First Pressing
No.	Title	Length
1.	"When I Come Around"	2:58
2.	"Coming Clean (Live at Aragoon Ballroom, Chicago, November 18, 1994)"	1:36
3.	"She (Live at Aragoon Ballroom, Chicago, November 18, 1994)"	2:14

Australian CD
No.	Title	Music	Length
1.	"When I Come Around"		2:58
2.	"Longview (Live at Jannus Landing, St. Petersburg, Florida, March 11, 1994)"		3:30
3.	"Burnout (Live at Jannus Landing, St. Petersburg, Florida, March 11, 1994)"		2:11
4.	"2000 Light Years Away (Live at Jannus Landing, St. Petersburg, Florida, March 11, 1994)"	Green Day, Jesse Michaels, Pete Rypins, Dave E.C.	2:49

== Charts ==
=== Weekly charts ===
1995 weekly chart performance for "When I Come Around"
Chart (1995)	Peak position
Australia (ARIA)	7
Canada Top Singles (RPM)	3
Denmark (Hitlisten)	19
Europe (Eurochart Hot 100)	51
Finland Airplay (IFPI Finland)	32
Germany (GfK)	45
Iceland (Íslenski Listinn Topp 40)	2
Netherlands (Dutch Top 40 Tipparade)	2
Netherlands (Single Top 100)	33
New Zealand (Recorded Music NZ)	4
Quebec (ADISQ)	5
Scottish Singles Sales (Official Charts)	29
Spain Airplay (Music & Media)	15
Sweden (Sverigetopplistan)	28
UK Singles (Official Charts)	27
UK Rock & Metal (Official Charts)	2
US Radio Songs (Billboard)	6
US Alternative Airplay (Billboard)	1
US Mainstream Rock (Billboard)	2
US Pop Airplay (Billboard)	2

2011 weekly chart performance for "When I Come Around"
Chart (2011)	Peak position
US Billboard Rock Digital Songs	31

=== Year-end charts ===
1995 year-end chart performance for "When I Come Around"
Chart (1995)	Position
Australia (ARIA)	40
Canada Top Singles (RPM)	21
Iceland (Íslenski Listinn Topp 40)	12
New Zealand (RIANZ)	28
US Hot 100 Airplay (Billboard)	11
US Album Rock Tracks (Billboard)	4
US Modern Rock Tracks (Billboard)	10
US Top 40/Mainstream (Billboard)	6

== Certifications ==
Certifications for "When I Come Around"
Region	Certification	Certified units/sales
Australia (ARIA)	Gold	35,000^{^}
Canada (Music Canada)	4× Platinum	320,000^{‡}
Italy (FIMI)	Gold	50,000^{‡}
New Zealand (RMNZ)	2× Platinum	60,000^{‡}
Spain (Promusicae)	Gold	30,000^{‡}
United Kingdom (BPI)	Platinum	600,000^{‡}
United States (RIAA)	Gold	500,000^{*}
^{*} Sales figures based on certification alone.^{^} Shipments figures based on certification alone.^{‡} Sales+streaming figures based on certification alone.

== Release history ==
Release dates and formats for "When I Come Around"
Region	Date	Format(s)	Label(s)	Ref.
United States	December 1994	Radio	Reprise	
Australia	January 16, 1995	CD; cassette	Reprise	
United Kingdom	May 8, 1995	7-inch vinyl; CD; cassette	Reprise	

== Use in media ==
- "When I Come Around" was featured in the South Park episode "Hummels & Heroin", sung in the style of a barbershop quartet.
- It was also featured in the Green Day-themed Rock Band game Green Day: Rock Band.
- It is a purchasable Jam Track in the game Fortnite, alongside Basket Case and Welcome to Paradise.
- It has been featured in multiple media such as the trailer for Blast from the Past and an episode of the television series Hindsight.
- Green Day performed the song at FireAid to help with relief efforts for the January 2025 Southern California wildfires.
- It has been featured in the basketball video game NBA 2K26.
