= Minority (Green Day song) =

2000 single by Green Day

Single by Green Day

from the album Warning
- B-side: "Brat"; "86"; "Jackass"
- Released: August 29, 2000
- Studio: Studio 880 (Oakland, California)
- Genre: Folk punk
- Length: 2:49
- Label: Adeline
- Composer: Green Day
- Lyricist: Billie Joe Armstrong
- Producer: Green Day

Green Day singles chronology
"Nice Guys Finish Last" (1999)	"Minority" (2000)	"Warning" (2000)

Music video
- "Minority" on YouTube

"Minority" is a song by the American rock band Green Day. It was serviced to US rock radio on August 29, 2000, as the lead single from their sixth studio album, Warning (2000), and was released commercially in September. The song remained at No. 1 for five consecutive weeks on the US Billboard Modern Rock Tracks chart in late 2000 and also peaked at number one on the Billboard Bubbling Under Hot 100 Singles chart. Worldwide, the song reached number 18 in the United Kingdom and number 19 in Italy.

== Music video ==
The music video was released in September 2000 and directed by Evan Bernard (who also directed the "Nice Guys Finish Last" video). It was filmed in downtown San Diego and it shows the band on a parade float, playing their instruments in the middle of Broadway followed by a very reduced number of people. There are also computer-generated balloons made to look like each individual member. When he first sings the phrase "Fuck 'em all", Billie Joe can be seen giving the middle finger to the buildings to both the left and right and, by the end of the video, footage of the band destroying the float cross-cut with the band performing on the float intact is shown. An uncut version of the video was released on International Supervideos!.

== Other versions ==
Live versions have been included on Tune In, Tokyo..., Bullet in a Bible, BBC Sessions, and the 20th anniversary edition of American Idiot.

== Track listings ==
European CD single

1. "Minority" (radio version) – 2:51
2. "Brat" (live from Tokyo) – 1:42
3. "86" (live from Prague) – 2:59

Australian CD single

1. "Minority" (album version) – 2:49
2. "Brat" (live from Tokyo) – 1:42
3. "86" (live from Prague) – 2:59
4. "Jackass" (album version) – 2:47

US 7-inch single

A1. "Minority" – 2:49
A2. "Brat" (live from Tokyo) – 1:42
B1. "Jackass"
B2. "86" (live from Prague) – 2:59

7-inch vinyl box set

1. "Minority" – 2:49
2. "Warning" – 3:42
3. "Hold On" – 2:56
4. "Outsider" – 2:17

== Personnel ==
- Billie Joe Armstrong – guitar, lead vocals, harmonica
- Mike Dirnt – bass guitar, backing vocals
- Tre Cool – drums, accordion

== Charts ==
=== Weekly charts ===
Weekly chart performance for "Minority"
Chart (2000–2001)	Peak position
Australia (ARIA)	29
Europe (Eurochart Hot 100)	71
Ireland (IRMA)	43
Italy (FIMI)	19
New Zealand (Recorded Music NZ)	38
Scottish Singles Sales (Official Charts)	15
UK Singles (Official Charts)	18
UK Rock & Metal (Official Charts)	1
US Bubbling Under Hot 100 (Billboard)	1
US Adult Pop Airplay (Billboard)	33
US Alternative Airplay (Billboard)	1
US Mainstream Rock (Billboard)	15

=== Year-end charts ===
2000 year-end performance for "Minority"
Chart (2000)	Position
US Mainstream Rock Tracks (Billboard)	62
US Modern Rock Tracks (Billboard)	34

2001 year-end performance for "Minority"
Chart (2001)	Position
US Modern Rock Tracks (Billboard)	92

== Certifications ==
Certifications for "Minority"
Region	Certification	Certified units/sales
Japan (RIAJ)	Gold	100,000^{*}
United Kingdom (BPI)	Silver	200,000^{‡}
^{*} Sales figures based on certification alone.^{‡} Sales+streaming figures based on certification alone.

== Release history ==
Release dates and formats for "Minority"
Region	Date	Format(s)	Label(s)	Ref(s).
United States	August 29, 2000	Mainstream rock; active rock; alternative radio	Adeline	
United Kingdom	September 18, 2000	CD	Reprise	
Japan	September 20, 2000	CD	Reprise	
United States	November 6, 2000	Hot adult contemporary; modern adult contemporary radio	Adeline	
United States	November 7, 2000	Contemporary hit radio	Adeline	
