= National Bowl =

Outdoor amphitheatre in Milton Keynes

Coordinates: 52°01′07″N 0°45′38″W

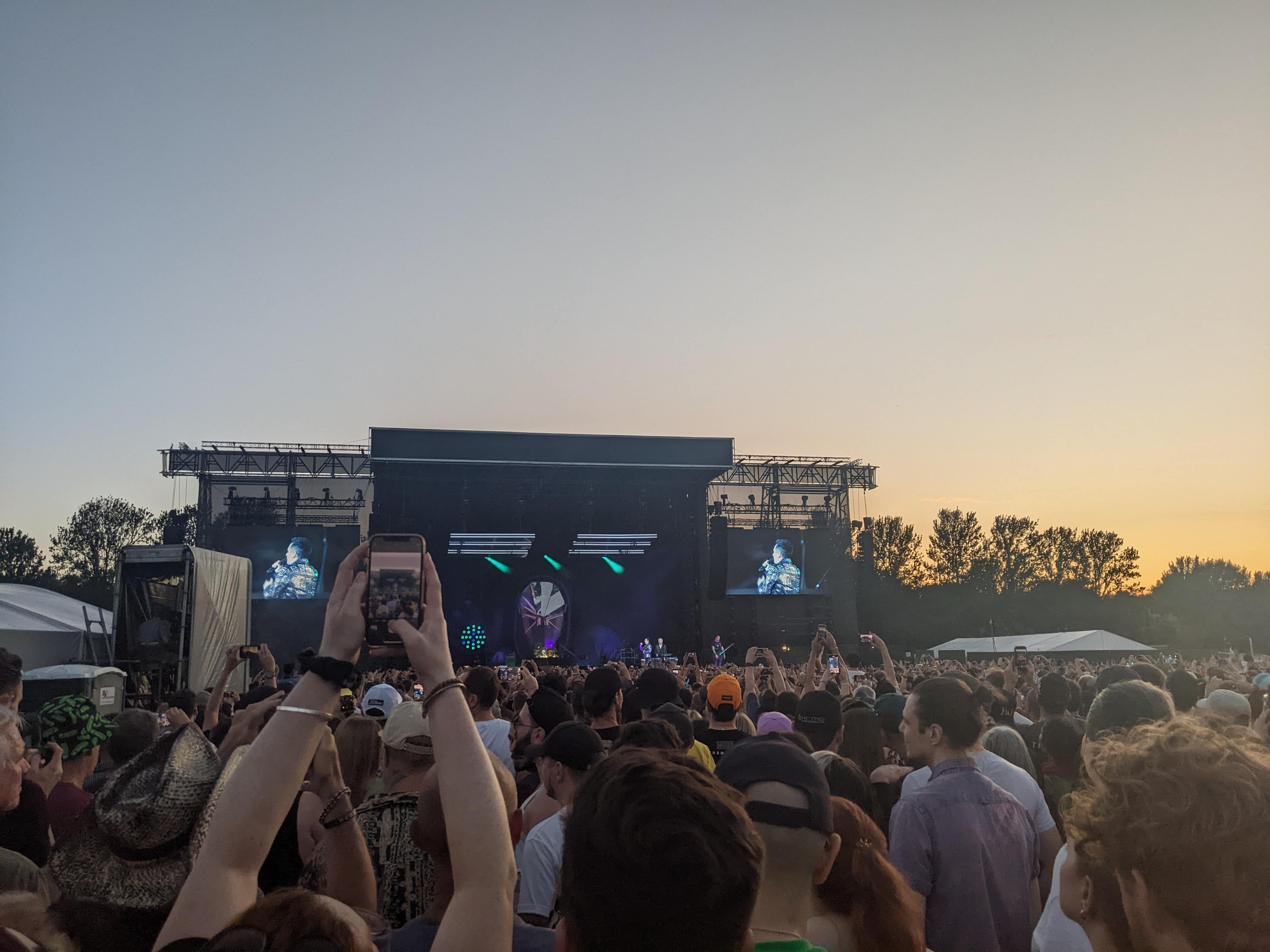
- Muse performing at the Bowl in 2023
- Interactive map of National Bowl
- Former names: Milton Keynes Bowl (1979–1992)
- Location: Milton Keynes, Buckinghamshire, England
- Owner: Homes England
- Operator: Gaming International/Live Nation UK
- Capacity: 65,000
- Type: Stadium Amphitheatre

Construction
- Opened: 1979
- Renovated: 2012

Website
- thenationalbowl.net

The National Bowl (originally the Milton Keynes Bowl) is an entertainment venue located in Milton Keynes, Buckinghamshire, England. The site was a former clay pit (for brick-making), filled in and raised to form an amphitheatre using sub-soil excavated by the many new developments in the area. It has a maximum capacity of 65,000. The arena is open-air grassland, without seats.

== History ==
The venue opened in 1979, with gigs by Desmond Dekker and Geno Washington.

In 1992, Sony/Pace bought the venue and re-branded it as the National Bowl, building a massive permanent sound stage. They pulled out in 1996 citing profitability reasons.

English Partnerships, which merged with the Homes and Communities Agency in 2008, bought the site in 2000. From 2006 to 2010, it was leased to a Gaming International/Live Nation UK consortium.

== Development plans ==
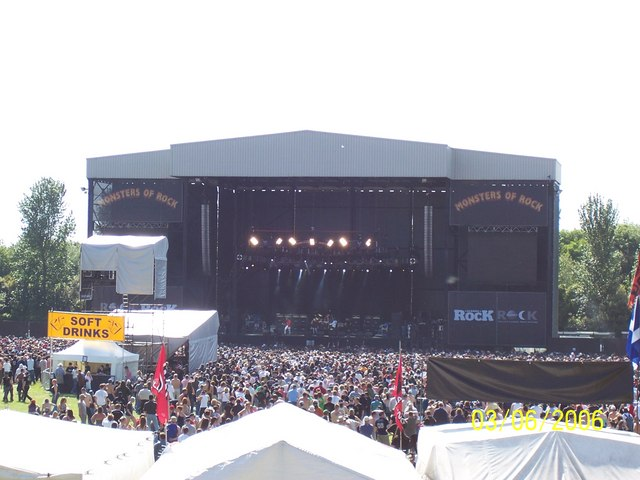
The Stage in 2006.

=== 2006 development plans ===
On 23 January 2006, Gaming International/Live Nation won a further lease in a competitive tender. The consortium made proposals for major developments in a a development summary leaflet (previously linked from the 'Backstage' section of the National Bowl website, now removed).

Gaming International handed The Bowl back to Milton Keynes Partnership towards the end of 2010 – so it is unlikely that any of the plans outlined in 2006 will ever be undertaken – apart from a temporary structure built close to The Bowl in summer 2010 which has a temporary three-year planning permission.

=== 2013 proposed plans ===
In December 2011, Milton Keynes Council officially adopted proposals to make Milton Keynes an "International Sporting City" which included ambitious plans to redevelop the National Bowl into an international-standard sports training base suitable for hosting visiting international teams when they played at Stadium MK or elsewhere in the UK and also as a permanent home for MK Dons.

Milton Keynes Council agreed to fund the training complex as part of a property deal with Inter MK, a property development company owned by MK Dons chairman Peter Winkelman, on land owned by the Council in Newport Pagnell that was earmarked for housing development and expected to increase substantially in value when planning permission was given. The funding plan involved sale of the site to Inter MK for £2 million, with half of any increase in the value of the site being used to fund the training ground development and the remainder being returned to the council. However, this plan was abandoned in early 2014 following some local residents beginning judicial review proceedings against the council on the basis that the plan involved illegal state aid to Inter MK.

Milton Keynes Council consulted on these plans in 2013 before ultimately deciding not to pursue the proposals the following year.

=== 2014 proposed plans ===
In February 2014, the BBC reported that an investment company had proposed a new development at the site of Milton Keynes Bowl. This was planned to include the UK's largest water park, and a range of sports facilities and enhancements to the arena. In July 2015, the investment firm leading the proposal announced that it would not proceed with the plan.

=== 2019–2023 proposed plans ===
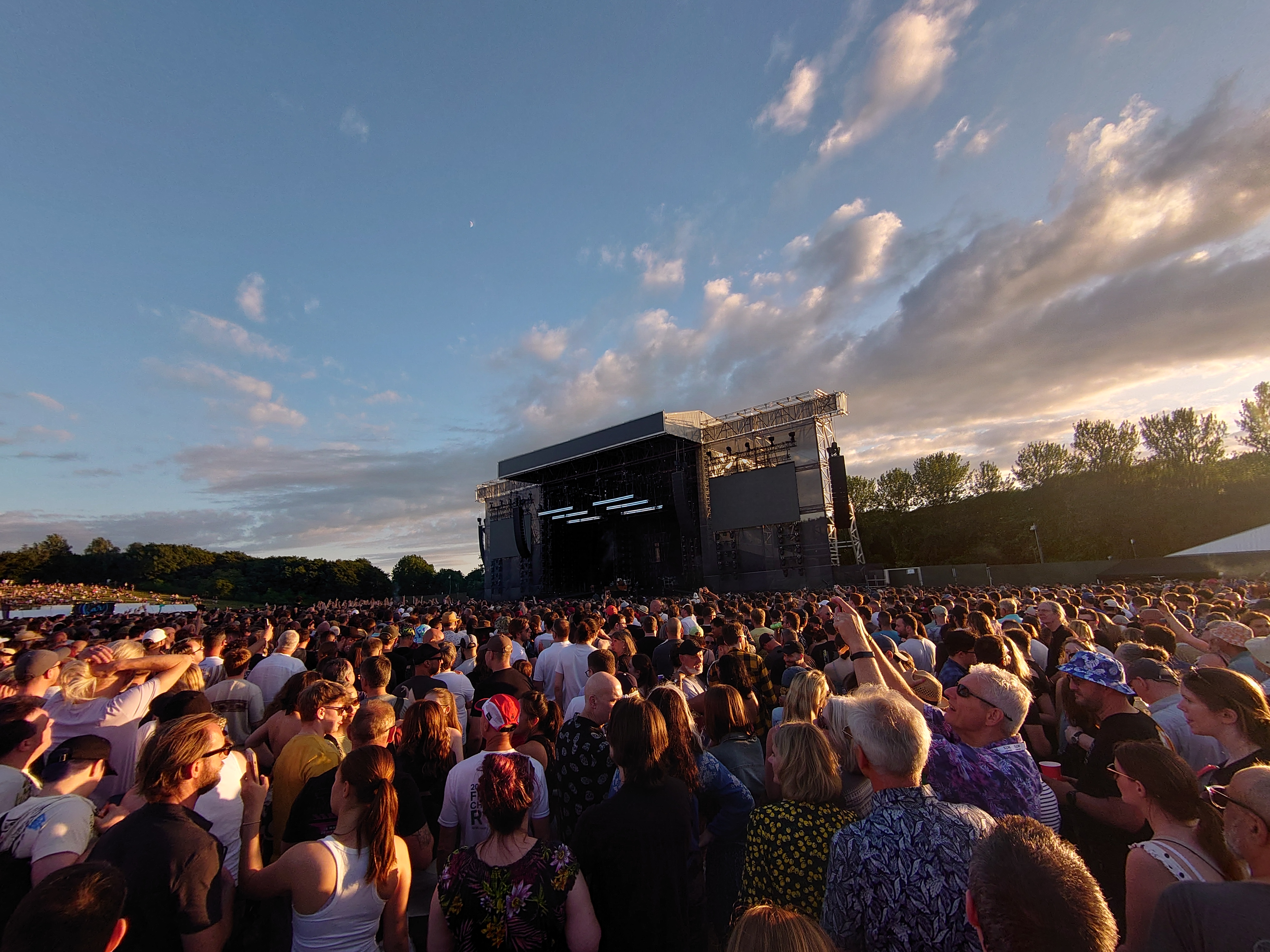
The stage set for a performance by Muse in June 2023.

In June 2019, Milton Keynes Council replaced the previous objective in its Council Plan to "Revitalise MK Bowl" with an objective to "Support the MK Dons in delivering a high-standard training ground and academy".

This allowed a deal to be agreed in September 2019 between Milton Keynes Council and Inter MK Limited for the National Bowl to be converted into a sports training ground facility partly funded by the Section 106 contributions from enabling commercial and leisure development at the site.

This returned to the 2013 proposals which Milton Keynes Council had decided not to pursue. It followed the sale by Inter MK of land in Newport Pagnell to Milton Keynes Council for £11 million in July 2018.

Inter MK is expected to lodge its planning application with Milton Keynes Council by the end of 2020.

In February 2023, Inter MK said that it had been granted planning permission for two full-sized football pitches and training grids on the site, "with plans to still hold concerts at the site in future".

== Recordings ==
- Queen released a DVD and double CD of their 1982 appearance at the Bowl entitled Queen on Fire – Live at the Bowl.
- Status Quo had their 'End of the Road' concert filmed here, in 1984. The film was released on twi VHS tapes, 'End of the Road', and 'More from End of the Road'. The concert marked their end as a touring band, but was later revived in 1985 for the Live Aid concert.
- Michael Jackson performed at this venue in front of 60,000 fans (on each of three successive nights) but there is only one recording (so far) that includes Wanna Be Startin' Somethin', This Place Hotel, and Another Part of Me.
- Erasure performed their last dates of the Wild! Tour and called "Erasure Live at Milton Keynes Bowl" on 1 September 1990 with more than 60,000 people in the National Bowl. This spectacular show by Erasure was broadcast live on "Radio 1" and BBC Television and it was presented by BBC Radio 1's Gary Davies.
- Metallica performed their last leg of the Wherever I May Roam Tour and called it Nowhere Left to Roam at the Bowl on 5 June 1993. This was broadcast live on "Radio 1".
- R.E.M.'s live album box set R.E.M. at the BBC includes a complete 1995 concert at the Bowl.
- Green Day's album Bullet in a Bible, and the accompanying DVD, were recorded at the National Bowl in the summer of 2005. The band's two-night stand was supported by Jimmy Eat World, Taking Back Sunday and Hard-Fi. The bowl also appears in Green Day: Rock Band as one of the playable venues.
- Linkin Park released Road to Revolution: Live at Milton Keynes, a CD/DVD set from their first ever UK Projekt Revolution show, filmed on 29 June 2008. Jay Z also headlined with supporting acts Pendulum, N.E.R.D, Enter Shikari, The Bravery & Innerpartysystem. This show turned out to be the biggest capacity Projekt Revolution to date, and it was the first year in the tour's history to be featured outside North America.
- The Prodigy released first live album and second DVD of their 2010 appearance at the Bowl entitled World's on Fire.
- Swedish House Mafia held their (then) final UK show on their farewell tour in July 2012. Scenes from the performance were seen in the music video for their final single, "Don't You Worry Child".

== Location ==
The Bowl is in south central Milton Keynes, at the junction of Watling Street with Chaffron Way, just north of Bletchley. Parking on site (MK5 8AA) is very limited so fans are encouraged to arrive by public transport. In addition to the shuttle buses from Milton Keynes Central railway station, it is also an easy walk (about 2 km (1.2 mi)) from the station following Sustrans National Cycle Route 51 from the south side of, then behind, the station building.

== See also ==
- List of contemporary amphitheatres
