= Green Day: Rock Band =

2010 video game

- Developer: Harmonix
- Publisher: MTV Games
- Producers: Kurt Reiner; Jared Goldberg; Kristen Price
- Series: Rock Band
- Platforms: PlayStation 3, Wii, Xbox 360
- Release: NA: June 8, 2010; PAL: June 11, 2010
- Genre: Rhythm
- Modes: Single-player, multiplayer

Green Day: Rock Band is a 2010 rhythm game developed by Harmonix, published by MTV Games, and distributed by Electronic Arts. It is the sixth console installment in the Rock Band series and the second band-centric game, following The Beatles: Rock Band (2009). It allows players to simulate rock music by using controllers shaped like musical instruments. The game's setlist consists of songs by American rock band Green Day. Rock Band features virtual depictions of the three band members performing the songs in new venues designed for the game.

The game incorporates existing Green Day songs already released for the Rock Band series as downloadable content, and allows players to export its full track list to the other Rock Band game titles except The Beatles: Rock Band. A free playable demo for the game was made available on May 25, 2010 for the Xbox Live Marketplace and on May 27, 2010 for the PlayStation Network. The demo features full, playable versions of two songs from the game, "Welcome to Paradise" and "Boulevard of Broken Dreams".

== Gameplay ==
Green Day: Rock Band features gameplay similar to other games in the Rock Band series, played by avatars of the Green Day band members at recreations of venues from their concert tours. This screenshot shows "Are We the Waiting/St. Jimmy".

Green Day: Rock Band allows players to perform simulated rock music by providing up to four players with the ability to play three different controllers modeled after music instruments: a guitar controller for lead guitar and bass guitar gameplay, a drum controller and a microphone for vocals. Players simulate performances by using their controllers to play scrolling notes. For lead and bass guitar, this is accomplished by holding down colored buttons mimicking guitar frets and pushing the controller's strum bar. For drums, this requires striking the matching colored drumhead, or stepping on the pedal to simulate playing bass drum notes. When singing vocals, the player must sing in relative pitch to the original vocals. A pitch indicator displays the singer's accuracy relative to the original pitch. The game supports harmonies as introduced in The Beatles: Rock Band, allowing multiple singers to perform the vocal portion. Harmonies will be added to the six songs already available as downloadable content for the game when played in Green Day: Rock Band.

As in previous Rock Band games, successfully hitting the proper notes in sequence earns points for each player and boosts their "performance meter". If a player fails to match the notes, their performance meter drops. If the meter empties, that player is forced to drop out of play, temporarily silencing that instrument and causing the band's overall performance to drop. Any player to drop out can be "saved" if another player activates "Overdrive", which is collected by successfully completing specially-marked phrases, and for guitar and bass players, using the controller's whammy bar to alter the pitch of marked sustained notes. Overdrive can also be used to temporarily increase the number of points the band earns. Activating Overdrive is specific to each "instrument". For guitar, the controller must be temporarily shifted to an upright position; for drums, a specific drumhead must be hit at the end of a drum fill when prompted; and for vocals, a noise must be registered by the microphone when prompted. The game does not feature any "Big Rock Endings", which allowed players to improvise at the end of a song for additional scoring as in the other Rock Band games, nor includes any clapping or tambourine sections for the vocalist player, due to lack of places in Green Day's songs to include the features. Immediately before playing a song, players must choose their difficulty level; ranging from "Easy" to "Expert". A "No Fail" mode has been carried over from Rock Band 2 and is accessible from the difficulty menu. Players are also able to identify their handedness for guitar, bass, or drums before the start or during a song via the game's "pause" menu. Upon completing a song, the players are given a star rating, from 1 to 5 stars, or 5 gold stars for very high scores if all band members are playing on Expert.

Green Day: Rock Band features a Career mode, similar to The Beatles: Rock Band. However, it allows the player to immediately select any of the available songs and records to play from the start instead of stepping through specific sets. The Career mode has a "meta-game" through various challenges that subsequently unlock additional rewards (photographs or videos contained on disc), such as by completing every song in a specific set with a 4-star rating or higher. Some challenges require the players' band to earn enough "cred" to unlock them; these additional challenges three or four song challenges built around certain themes. A Quick play mode allows players to select one of more of the songs available to the game to play outside of Career mode. A drum trainer mode is available to help players become accustomed to the instrument controller. The trainer includes a set of stock rhythms that are generic for most songs, and a set of "Tre's Greatest Hits" with drum patterns and solos taken from Tré Cool's performances, including one "ferocious" solo that runs across two different lessons.

=== Instrument peripherals ===
All available Rock Band peripherals are compatible with their respective console version of Green Day: Rock Band. Some controllers designed for Guitar Hero games also work with Green Day: Rock Band. While The Beatles: Rock Band received unique instruments bundled with the release, Green Day: Rock Band is a software only release and is not bundled with instruments of its own.

== Development ==
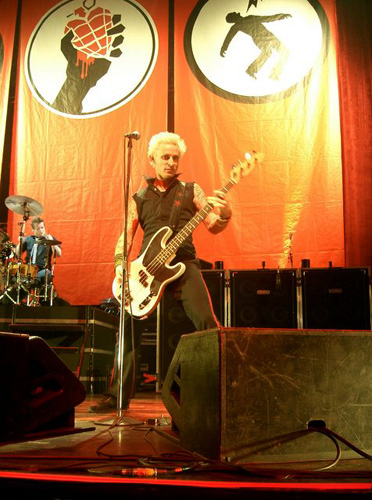

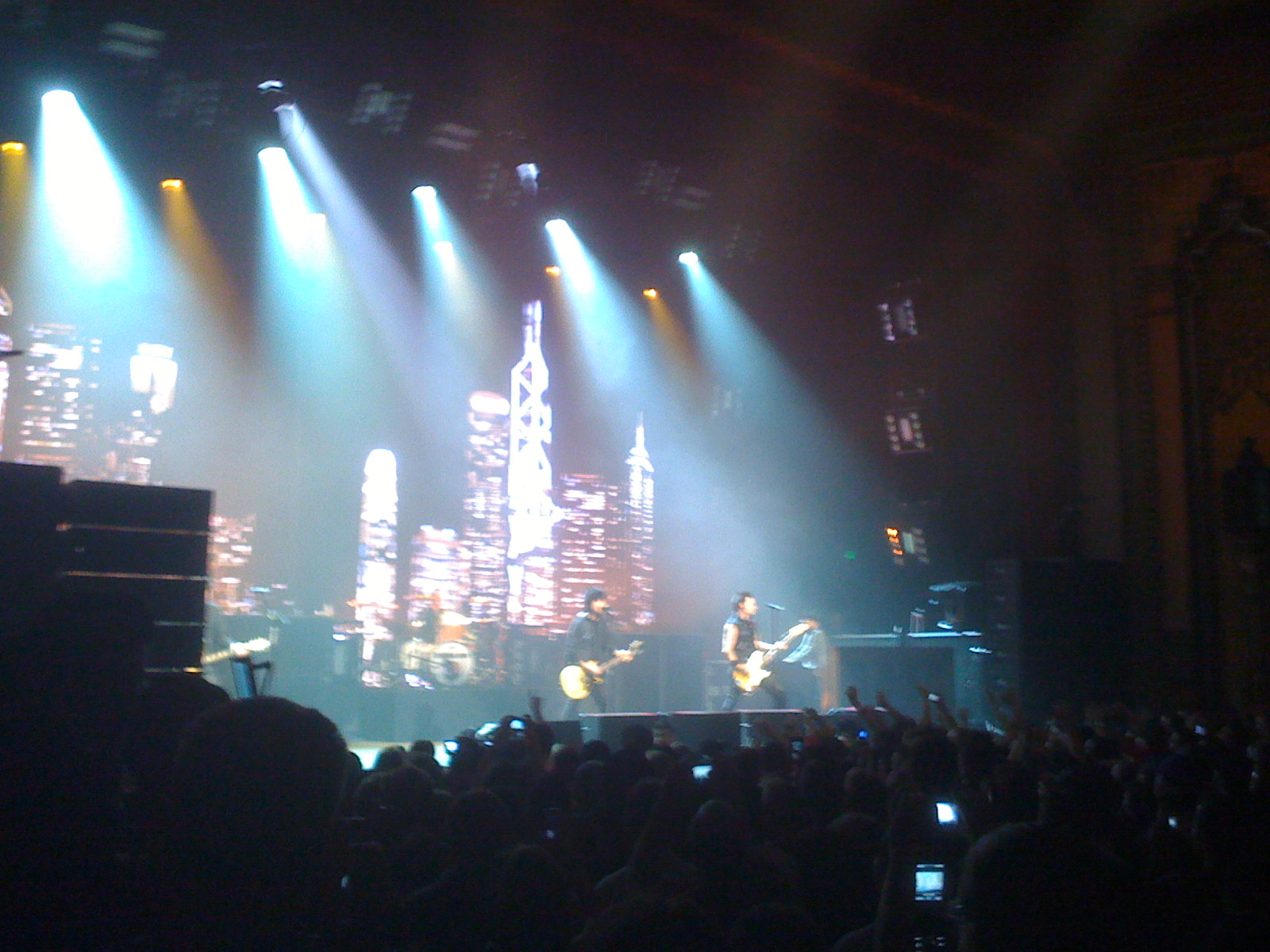
Green Day: Rock Band features avatars of the band members, including Mike Dirnt (top, center) and Tré Cool, and two real-life venues based on the band's tours, including the American Idiot World Tour performance on Milton Keynes National Bowl (top) and the 21st Century Breakdown World Tour performance at the Fox Theatre in Oakland, CA on April 14, 2009 (bottom).

Prior to mid-2009, only some music from Warner Music Group (which includes Green Day's label, Reprise Records) had been included in games like Guitar Hero or Rock Band, with the gaming industry believing that the music publisher was boycotting the music game genre over how little money they saw from the sales of the game. However, Warner Music Group and MTV Games stated that the lack of songs from the publisher was due to current negotiations over new licensing costs. The two companies had reached a deal by June 2009, when a downloadable pack of Green Day songs was made available to the Rock Band series, heralded by both companies.

With the release of the song pack, speculation arose about more band-specific Rock Band titles to accompany The Beatles: Rock Band, and Green Day was mentioned among them most often. Though this was denied, MTV and Harmonix, the team who worked on all Rock Band titles, stated that they were working with a few artists and announcements were to be made soon. This was followed by Green Day's frontman Billie Joe Armstrong leaking that the band was working on a Rock Band project, but details were scarce. This was originally thought to be a track pack disc similar to the AC/DC Live: Rock Band Track Pack or another pack of downloadable songs.

Drummer Tré Cool later confirmed that the band was approached by Harmonix during the development of The Beatles: Rock Band for the band-specific game, while Armstrong stated they first experienced a Rock Band game, specifically The Beatles: Rock Band, at a cast party for the American Idiot musical performance in Berkeley, California. The game was formally unveiled on December 12, 2009 at the Spike TV Video Game Awards 2009. Green Day announced the game via a video and showed the first trailer. A subsequent press release by MTV Games confirmed that the game would arrive on the Xbox 360, PlayStation 3, and Wii with the entire setlist being exportable to other Rock Band titles. A 2010 release date was also stated. In addition, previous Green Day downloadable songs released for Rock Band and Rock Band 2 would be included in the game as well.

Paul DeGooyer, Senior Vice President of MTV Games, stated that Green Day was selected as the next band to focus on due to input from fans of the game. DeGooyer also claimed that the band's music lent itself well to the format, as the music is both "fun to play" and also covers a range of genres from the band's early days in punk rock to their modern, alternative-based works. MTV Games' Global Head of Sales Scott Guthrie believed the band had a larger awareness for their target market (16- to 34-year-old males) than The Beatles, and expected Green Day: Rock Band would see better sales as a result.

Harmonix's Chris Foster noted that the opportunity for making a Green Day-specific game was a matter of happenstance; at the same time they had completed The Beatles: Rock Band and were considering another band-centric game, the licensing deal with Warner Bros. Records presented the opportunity to include a large amount of Green Day's work into the Rock Band series. The Harmonix team felt it best to provide this as a stand-alone game as opposed to large DLC packs. The full game would also allow the developers to capture the "energy" of the band's members, Billie Joe Armstrong, Mike Dirnt, and Tré Cool, as they perform their songs. Armstrong noted that Green Day was approached "a long time ago by people who will remain anonymous" near the time of release of American Idiot, prior to the popularity of rhythm games, but declined, believing it "didn't feel right" due to the "cutthroat" nature of the video game industry at that point.

=== Music selection ===
The game is the first Harmonix game to feature a full album in the game as shipped, with the entirety of American Idiot, Dookie (except for hidden track "All By Myself"), and 21st Century Breakdown being playable. The inclusion of the full album of American Idiot was the centerpiece of the game's development, according to Harmonix' Chris Foster, due in part to the thematic nature of the album which is meant to be listened as a whole, as well as the album's success and Broadway musical. This led the team to also including 21st Century Breakdown, an album similar to American Idiot that is meant to be heard as one complete work; as Harmonix had already released six songs from the album as downloadable content, they did not want to make those that had purchased the songs have to pay for them again in the full game, and instead designed the game to immediately incorporate those songs into the game if the player had already purchased them. Once these two albums were selected, Harmonix' CEO Alex Rigopulos determined that they needed to include the full Dookie album, the major label debut of the band and one of the most requested albums by Rock Band fans, in order to complete the experience. Though Harmonix had considered including material from the earliest Green Day albums, 1,039/Smoothed Out Slappy Hours and Kerplunk, master multi-track recordings required by the Rock Band game engine to provide proper feedback when playing were not readily available. According to Cool, while the master tapes for Kerplunk exist, they are in poor shape and the process to digitize them would destroy the tape; as such, Cool stated "We're making sure we have the right dudes to do it" as potential future downloadable content for the game. Harmonix opted against using live versions of songs on these albums, feeling that the game needed to stay with the studio versions of the songs. Once Harmonix had selected to focus on the three albums, they decided against including any additional non-Green Day songs, instead focusing on rounding out the group's history to present a complete Green Day experience.

Green Day: Rock Band features songs with up to three parts of harmony, featuring the same functionality as The Beatles: Rock Band. Harmonix noted that many of Green Day's songs are actually two part harmonies traded off with other lines, such as in "Homecoming", the only song in the game that features a three-part harmony. They authored the vocals on most of the songs to have the third vocalist (if present) singing the trade-off lines alongside the two-part harmony singers. There is very little censoring of the lyrics; according to the project lead Chris Foster, only about four to five words across the entire game are muted. Harmonix considered their standards for inclusion of songs to be similar to downloadable content, allowing for mature references to drugs and sex. Harmonix left intact certain pairings of songs that "blended" together due to how they were released on media, such as "Brain Stew/Jaded" and some songs on the American Idiot album. They opted to leave the pairing of "Chump" and "Longview" as separate songs due to how "Longview" was eventually released as its own single.

Following the announcement of the band's 2012 album trilogy ¡Uno!, ¡Dos!, and ¡Tré!, it was announced that a DLC pack, called Green Day 03, would feature four songs from the existing game, as well as the song "Oh Love" from the album ¡Uno!. However, this pack would only be available for Rock Band 3 and Rock Band Blitz and would not work with Green Day: Rock Band.

=== Art direction ===
The game includes three venues representing the historical progression of the band. "The Warehouse" is a fictional venue set in 1994 that is based on a composite of "house parties and squats" where Green Day played before they became popular, and where all the songs from Dookie will be played. Part of the design of this venue was inspired by the clubs such as 924 Gilman Street where Green Day played before they were signed as a major label; as Green Day was signed by a major label by the time they recorded Dookie, Harmonix opted not to make the venue exactly based on 924 Gilman Street for historical accuracy. The National Bowl in Milton Keynes, England is used for American Idiot and other albums, having been the site where the 2005 Bullet in a Bible CD/DVD was recorded and where the band performed their first stadium show. The Fox Theatre in Oakland, California is used for songs from 21st Century Breakdown, replicating the debut 21st Century Breakdown 2009 performance by the band there, being the second show in the restored theater. Harmonix considered several other real-life venues based on past Green Day performances. Woodstock '94 was one possibility, but the development team found it difficult to create the daytime setting. The Hatch Shell in Boston was also considered, but the team felt that the venue has only regional awareness and was also marred by the riot that occurred after the Green Day concert there in 1994. They also considered using Madison Square Garden but determined that ultimately, it was not as interesting as the other venues. The band, in their original meetings with Harmonix's Foster, wanted to make sure the game captured the "excitement of their live concerts" and the accuracy of the venues they played at; Cool noted that the game "skips a lot" of the band's history, but provided enough input on the band's history to "personalize [the game] and put our stamp on it".

The band members declined to provide motion capture performances, however they did allow Harmonix to film them performing for reference. The motion capture for the band was instead performed by actors hired by Harmonix, incorporating video and concert footage to create avatars for each member unique to each venues. The band's support team helped to take photographs of the band member's tattoos, and identified when they were received so that the Harmonix artists could incorporate them properly into the avatars. All the songs, including the six Green Day songs previously released as downloadable content, feature unique animations tied to each song. This was a different approach than as taken for The Beatles: Rock Band, where they created snippets of framing and animation which could be easily repackaged for other songs, including future downloadable content. Because of the integrated nature of the songs and animations, there will be no further downloadable content available for the game. The game includes, as reward items, over 100 photographs and 40 minutes of video footage pulled from Warner Bros. Records' archive of the band. The video content has been pared down from over 20 hours of raw footage from concerts and studio records. Some of the live video footage will be used as part of the 21st Century Breakdown venue backdrops. Many of these rewards are specific to individual songs, such as photos taken during concert performances of the song, and thus given as rewards for completing these songs.

Harmonix has partnered with Demiurge Studios to help develop the game; Demiurge had previously helped Harmonix bring the Rock Band Track Packs to retail. Furthermore, Harmonix is working with design studio MK12, who previously created the interstitial movies in The Beatles: Rock Band, and other studios to bring Green Day and their band's history into the game. The opening cinematic created by MK12 is done in a similar style to what they made for The Beatles: Rock Band, spanning Green Day's career over a brief period of time.

== Soundtrack ==
The game features 47 tracks spanning the band's career, including two full albums—Dookie and American Idiot, and twelve out of eighteen tracks from 21st Century Breakdown (with the remaining six tracks available in the "Plus" edition of the game, or via pre-existing DLC). For Xbox 360 and PlayStation 3 owners, every song in the game can be exported for use within Rock Band, Rock Band 2 and Rock Band 3 for a $10 fee, or included in the cost of the "Plus" edition of the game or for pre-ordering the game at select vendors. Wii users can only export the songs into Rock Band 3. The remaining tracks can also be acquired from the Music Store as of November 13, 2012, as stand-alone or in packs corresponding to their respective albums (in the case of the three complete Green Day albums available).

== Reception ==
Reception

Aggregate scores
Aggregator	Score
GameRankings	77%
Metacritic	75/100

Review scores
Publication	Score
1Up.com	B
Eurogamer	7/10
G4	4/5
Game Informer	7.5/10
IGN	8.3/10

Green Day: Rock Band was generally well received by video game critics. Many critics noted the game follows the previous dedication to presentation, audio, and playability that were seen in The Beatles: Rock Band, though some believed it followed the formula too well to make it indistinguishable from the previous titles. Jack DeVries of IGN could not think of any easy way to identify the game from other Rock Band titles; "People kept asking me how the game was and all I could think to say was 'It's Green Day: Rock Band.'" Ben Kuchera of Ars Technica called the game "paint by numbers rocking", commenting that the feature set is essentially the same as The Beatles. Patrick Klepek of G4TV stated the game was "not as ambitious as The Beatles" but still came to help him appreciate the band more.

While the two games have similar content, some reviews felt that Green Day was a weaker title due to the limited number of venues compared with the Dreamscapes used in The Beatles, among other aspects. Johnny Minkley of Eurogamer felt the additional content unlocked by playing through songs was "supplied in a way that feels separate rather than woven in to enrich understanding and appreciation" of the band, and considered the game a "backward step" from The Beatles. 1UP.com's Justin Haywald considered the title less of a tribute to the band and more of a video game due to the need to repeatedly play content over and over again to unlock all of the included band's photos and videos. Critics felt that Harmonix were successful at capturing the sense of being at a live performance of Green Day through the detailed venues, animations of the band members, and banter and antics with the virtual crowds.

From a musical perspective of reviewers, the limited range of Green Day compared to the Beatles creates a much less diverse experience compared to the previous game, diminishing the interest level for those not familiar with Green Day's music. Many stated that one's personal enjoyment of the game would strictly depend on their preference for Green Day. While the inclusion of full albums was well received, some reviewers wished for more songs to be included in the game, particularly from their mid-career albums. Minkley considered that by skipping over these albums, "the experience is robbed of any real insight into Green Day's evolution" between Dookie and American Idiot. However, despite the song selections, reviewers found Green Day's songs to be better suited to Rock Band than The Beatles', in part to how enjoyable it was to play all the songs regardless of the instrument used, and without having to chart atypical instruments, such as piano or cello, to the instrument parts. Reviewers found the guitar portions to be challenging but not impossible due to the endurance of the chord-heavy part. DeVries found the vocal harmonies mechanics to be better suited to Green Day, as with the lyrical trade-offs in many of the songs, "it's less about trying to sing at a slightly higher pitch and more about just having fun". Critics also commented the use of censored radio edits to maintain the game's Teen rating, and felt this weakened the music included in the game. The ability to export the game's songs to other Rock Band was well received. However, Lou Kesten of the Associated Press noted that the added cost to export the game, as well as the cost of the additional six tracks available as downloadable content, made it feel that "MTV is nickel-and-diming its loyal audience".

Sales of Green Day: Rock Band within the month of June 2010 were considered "paltry" by industry analyst Doug Creutz, with only 82,000 units sold in North America.
