= Basket Case (song) =

- One of the artworks used for commercial overseas releases

Single by Green Day

from the album Dookie
- B-side: "On The Wagon"; "Tired of Waiting for You"; "409 in Your Coffee Maker"
- Released: August 1, 1994
- Recorded: September–October 1993
- Studio: Fantasy (Berkeley, California)
- Genre: Punk rock; pop-punk
- Length: 3:01
- Label: Reprise
- Composer: Green Day
- Lyricist: Billie Joe Armstrong
- Producers: Rob Cavallo; Green Day

Green Day singles chronology
"Longview" (1994)	"Basket Case" (1994)	"Welcome to Paradise" (1994)

Music video
- "Basket Case" on YouTube

"Basket Case" is a song by the American rock band Green Day, released on August 1, 1994, by Reprise Records as the second single from the band's third studio album, Dookie (1994). The song spent five weeks at the top of the US Billboard Alternative Songs chart and garnered a Grammy Award nomination in the category for Best Rock Vocal Performance by a Duo or Group. Its music video was directed by Mark Kohr and filmed in an abandoned mental institution in California. In 2001, the song appeared on their greatest hits album International Superhits!. In 2021, "Basket Case" was ranked number 150 in Rolling Stone's updated list of the "500 Greatest Songs of All Time".

== Origin and recording ==
Armstrong revealed in a 2024 podcast interview that around 1992–93, while living with bandmates, he wrote an early version of the song as a love song using a four-track recorder. He wrote the lyrics while on crystal meth, thinking he "was writing the greatest song ever" but finding them "embarrassingly bad" once sober. He set the song aside before eventually returning to rewrite the lyrics around his experiences with panic attacks, saying this was "the best decision I'd ever made, probably, as a songwriter". The band subsequently demoed the rewritten song at Andy Ernst's Art of Ears studio in San Francisco.

"Basket Case" was one of the songs producer Rob Cavallo heard when he received Green Day's demo tape. He ended up signing the band to Reprise Records in mid-1993. Green Day and Cavallo recorded the version of "Basket Case" released on the trio's major label debut Dookie between September and October 1993 at Fantasy Studios in Berkeley, California.

== Composition and lyrics ==
"Basket Case" (1994)
An 18-second sample of the second chorus of "Basket Case", in which the entire band plays the instruments.

"Basket Case" is a punk rock and pop-punk song, performed in the key of E-flat major. Fred Thomas of AllMusic described the track as a "neurotic punk rock cardio workout". The introductory verse features only Armstrong and his guitar. Towards the end of the first chorus, the rest of the band joins in, with Tré Cool adding fast tom fills and explosive transitions and Mike Dirnt adding a bass line that is reminiscent of the vocal melody. The song's chord progression closely mirrors that of Pachelbel's Canon.

In the song's second verse, the lyrics reference soliciting a male prostitute. Armstrong explained: "I wanted to challenge myself and whoever the listener might be. It's also looking at the world and saying, 'It's not as black and white as you think. This isn't your grandfather's prostitute – or maybe it was.'" The song's title "Basket Case" never appears in the lyrics.

== Release and reception ==
"Basket Case" was the second single released from Dookie, following "Longview". It peaked at number one on the Billboard Modern Rock Tracks chart, a position it maintained for five weeks. In 1995, the song garnered a Grammy Award nomination in the Best Rock Vocal Performance by a Duo or Group category.

In his weekly UK chart commentary, James Masterton wrote, "Something of an instant classic [...] it is certainly one of the most alternative Top 10 smash since Radiohead's 'Creep'. As to where it goes next it is hard to tell but it could potentially open the door for a flood of the post-Nirvana young American rock bands who are currently making waves on the other side of the Atlantic." Andrew Mueller from Melody Maker commented, "Green Day themselves are an enthusiastically rockin' kind of act who've learnt a neat trick or two from The Buzzcocks and The Ramones and are the sort of band I'm regrettably likely to think are the future of rock'n'roll if I've drunk enough to stun an ox." Music Week gave the song three out of five, describing it as "the Generation X-flag-wavers' splenetic slice of Bay Area punk". John Mulvey from NME wrote, "Long-time heroes of the US skatepunk scene. Green Day are These Animal Men without the crap Brit-mod trappings and with slightly better songs. Bouncy, a bit fraggly and a bit annoying, but there are worse things in the world. Like 'Speed King', for starters."

Upon the re-release, another NME editor, Andy Richardson, praised it as "an irresistible punk snort, a ripping three-minute blast or the ultimate good mood record to play before you go out, depending which way you look at it." Paul Evans from Rolling Stone declared it as a "rave-up", noting that Green Day's lyrics "score graffiti hits". Mark Sutherland from Smash Hits gave it a top score of five out of five and named it Best New Single. He wrote, "Their last single 'Welcome to Paradise' grazed the top 20 here but this is the one to make your mum hammer on your bedroom door 'cos it sounds like you're smashing up your wardrobe. And the funny thing is — you will be 'cos it's quite the most fantastic bedroom-trashing anthem in too long a while." Charles Aaron from Spin ranked "Basket Case" number 19 in his list of the "Top 20 Singles of the Year" in December 1994. Troy J. Augusto from Variety described it as "psycho-rave".

== Music video ==
The accompanying music video for "Basket Case" was directed by Mark Kohr. It was filmed in an actual mental institution called Agnews Developmental Center in Santa Clara County, California, at the request of the band members. The mental institution had been abandoned, but most of the structure remained in a broken-down state. The band members found old patient files, deep scratches in the walls and dental molds scattered around. The video frequently references the films One Flew Over the Cuckoo's Nest and Brazil. The video was originally filmed in monochrome with the colors "painstakingly" added afterward, which yields what Kerrang! describes as an "over-saturated, surreal look".

The video was nominated for nine MTV Video Music Awards in 1995: Video of the Year, Best Group Video, Best Metal/Hard Rock Video, Best Alternative Video, Breakthrough Video, Best Direction, Best Editing, Best Cinematography, and Viewer's Choice Award. The video did not win in any of the categories it was nominated for.

== Impact and legacy ==
In 2006, on Mike Davies and Zane Lowe's Lock Up Special on BBC Radio 1, the listeners voted "Basket Case" the Greatest Punk Song of All Time. In 2009, it was named the 33rd best hard rock song of all time by VH1. In 2021, Kerrang! ranked the song number three on their list of the 20 greatest Green Day songs, while it was ranked number 150 in Rolling Stone's "500 Greatest Songs of All Time" that same year. In 2022, American Songwriter ranked "Basket Case" number two on their list of the 10 greatest Green Day songs. According to Loudwire, lyrics for the track were among the most-searched in the punk rock genre according to a study that examined Google searches from January 2019 through July 2023. In 2024, Forbes magazine ranked it number 36 in their list of "The 50 Best Songs of the 1990s". Hugh McIntyre noted that the song "somehow managed to blend the ferocity and fury of punk with top 40-ready hooks, making the angsty tune an unlikely, and rollicking, hit".

== In popular culture ==
"Weird Al" Yankovic featured "Basket Case" in his 1996 polka medley "The Alternative Polka" from Bad Hair Day.

In August 2017, the English band Bastille released a version of the song for the Peter Serafinowicz series The Tick, but the song was never used in the show.

The song has also been covered and released as a promotional single by Avril Lavigne, who performed the song during her first headlining tour, the Try to Shut Me Up Tour, as seen on her live album Avril Lavigne: My World.

In 2024, it was added to Fortnite in Fortnite Festival as a jam track alongside "Welcome to Paradise" and "When I Come Around".

The song was featured in the video game BMX XXX. It is also featured in the dance rhythm game Just Dance 2025 Edition.

The song was also featured in the absurdist black comedy thriller film Bugonia.

== Track listings ==
All lyrics are written by Billie Joe Armstrong; except where noted; all music is composed by Green Day; except where noted.

First Pressing
No.	Title	Lyrics	Music	Length
1.	"Basket Case"			3:01
2.	"On the Wagon"			2:48
3.	"Tired of Waiting for You" (The Kinks Cover)	Ray Davies		2:30
4.	"409 In Your Coffeemaker (Unmixed)"		Billie Joe Armstrong, Mike Dirnt, John Kiffmeyer	3:30

Limited Edition Single
No.	Title	Music	Length
1.	"Basket Case"		3:01
2.	"Longview (Live at Jannus Landing, St. Petersburg, Florida, March 11, 1994)"		3:30
3.	"Burnout (Live at Jannus Landing, St. Petersburg, Florida, March 11, 1994)"		2:11
4.	"2000 Light Years Away (Live at Jannus Landing, St. Petersburg, Florida, March 11, 1994)"	Green Day, Jesse Michaels, Pete Rypins, Dave E.C.	2:49

Japanese CD
No.	Title	Lyrics	Length
1.	"Basket Case"		3:01
2.	"She"		2:14
3.	"Emenius Sleepus"	Mike Dirnt	1:44

== Credits and personnel ==
Green Day

- Billie Joe Armstrong – lead vocals, guitar
- Mike Dirnt – bass guitar, backing vocals
- Tré Cool – drums

Production

- Rob Cavallo – producer
- Green Day – producers

== Charts ==
=== Weekly charts ===
1994–1995 weekly chart performance for "Basket Case"
Chart (1994–1995)	Peak position
Australia (ARIA)	85
Belgium (Ultratop 50 Flanders)	26
Belgium (Ultratop 50 Wallonia)	21
Canada Top Singles (RPM)	12
Denmark (Hitlisten)	19
European Hot 100 Singles (Music & Media)	11
Finland Airplay (IFPI Finland)	30
France (SNEP)	35
Germany (GfK)	18
Iceland (Íslenski Listinn Topp 40)	11
Ireland (IRMA)	11
Israel (IBA)	37
Netherlands (Dutch Top 40 Tipparade)	4
Netherlands (Single Top 100)	39
New Zealand (Recorded Music NZ)	21
Norway (VG-lista)	2
Quebec (ADISQ)	47
Scottish Singles Sales (Official Charts)	9
Sweden (Sverigetopplistan)	3
UK Singles (Official Charts)	7
US Radio Songs (Billboard)	26
US Alternative Airplay (Billboard)	1
US Mainstream Rock (Billboard)	9
US Pop Airplay (Billboard)	16

2025 weekly chart performance for "Basket Case"
Chart (2025)	Peak position
Japan Hot Overseas (Billboard Japan)	13

=== Year-end charts ===
1994 year-end chart performance for "Basket Case"
Chart (1994)	Position
Canada Top Singles (RPM)	89
Sweden (Topplistan)	51
US Modern Rock Tracks (Billboard)	4

1995 year-end chart performance for "Basket Case"
Chart (1995)	Position
Belgium (Ultratop 50 Wallonia)	50
European Hot 100 Singles (Music & Media)	74
Germany (Media Control)	40
Latvia (LAIPA)	46
Norway Winter Period (VG-lista)	2
Sweden (Topplistan)	22

== Certifications ==
Certifications and sales for "Basket Case"
Region	Certification	Certified units/sales
Canada (Music Canada)	6× Platinum	480,000^{‡}
Denmark (IFPI Danmark)	Platinum	90,000^{‡}
Germany (BVMI)	Platinum	600,000^{‡}
Italy (FIMI)	2× Platinum	200,000^{‡}
Japan (RIAJ)	Gold	100,000^{*}
New Zealand (RMNZ)	3× Platinum	90,000^{‡}
Spain (Promusicae)	Platinum	60,000^{‡}
United Kingdom (BPI)	3× Platinum	1,800,000^{‡}
^{*} Sales figures based on certification alone.^{‡} Sales+streaming figures based on certification alone.

== Release history ==
Release dates and formats for "Basket Case"
Region	Date	Format(s)	Label(s)	Ref.
United States	1994	Radio	Reprise	
United Kingdom	August 1, 1994	7-inch vinyl; CD; cassette	Reprise	
Australia	October 3, 1994	CD; cassette	Reprise	
United Kingdom (re-release)	January 16, 1995	7-inch vinyl; CD; cassette	Reprise	
Japan	June 25, 1995	CD	Reprise	
