= Welcome to Paradise =

1991 song by Green Day (re-recorded as 1994 single)

Song by Green Day

from the album Kerplunk
- Released: December 17, 1991
- Genre: Punk rock; pop punk
- Length: 3:30
- Label: Lookout
- Composer: Green Day
- Lyricist: Billie Joe Armstrong
- Producers: Andy Ernst; Green Day

"Welcome to Paradise"

Single by Green Day

from the album Dookie
- Released: October 17, 1994
- Genre: Punk rock; pop punk
- Length: 3:44
- Label: Reprise
- Composer: Green Day
- Lyricist: Billie Joe Armstrong
- Producers: Rob Cavallo; Green Day

Green Day singles chronology
"Basket Case" (1994)	"Welcome to Paradise" (1994)	"When I Come Around" (1995)

Music video
- "Welcome to Paradise" on YouTube

"Welcome to Paradise" is a song by the American rock band Green Day. It first appeared as the third track on the band's second studio album, Kerplunk (1991). It was re-recorded and rereleased as the fifth track on the band's third studio album, Dookie (1994), and released as the album's third single. It did not receive a domestic physical release, though the song still saw radio airplay; it eventually became available in the United Kingdom on October 17, 1994, and in Australia six months later. The song peaked at number 56 on the US Billboard Hot 100 Airplay chart. The Dookie version is more popular and was later included on the band's 2001 compilation album, International Superhits!.

== Song meaning and composition ==
The lyrics were written by Billie Joe Armstrong and the music by Armstrong with Mike Dirnt and Tré Cool. It is based on the band members' experiences of moving out of their parents' houses and into an abandoned house in Oakland, California, where they, along with a number of others, lived without paying rent. The house was quite broken-down but to them it became home, and this feeling is described in the song.

Billie Joe Armstrong said this of the song, "It's about West Oakland, living in a warehouse with a lot of people, a bunch of artists and musicians, punks and whatever just lived all up and down, bums and junkies and thugs and gang members and stuff that just lived in that area. It's no place you want to walk around at night, but it's a neat warehouse where you can play basketball and stuff."

The song is played with the guitar in E♭ standard (tuned a half-step down), as are many of their Dookie songs.

The song is sung as Armstrong is talking or sending a message to his mother, after moving out of her house. In the first verse, he is talking to his mother after three weeks of leaving, telling her that he is scared about being on his own. The second part describes him writing to her six months later, now happy to live on his own.

== Critical reception ==
Martin Aston from Music Week noted that "America's latest success story have yet to explode in the UK but that could change." He complimented the song as "a good example of the band's riotous, punk-pop japery, with the added bonus of the band's first UK tour to move things along."

== Music video ==
A video was released for the song that shows the band playing the song live at Slim's in San Francisco, California, with the studio version dubbed over the performance. It is one of two videos not to be included on the band's first DVD, International Supervideos! (the other being "Macy's Day Parade").

According to Matt Bettinelli-Olpin, who can be seen getting kicked in the face in the video by a stage diver, the papers burned on stage in the video were local newspaper articles about Green Day.

== Track listing ==
All lyrics are written by Billie Joe Armstrong; except where noted; all music is composed by Green Day.

No.	Title	Lyrics	Length
1.	"Welcome to Paradise"		3:45
2.	"Chump (Live at Jannus Landing, St. Petersburg, Florida, March 11, 1994)"		2:44
3.	"Emenius Sleepus"	Mike Dirnt	1:44

== Personnel ==
Green Day

- Billie Joe Armstrong – lead vocals, guitar
- Mike Dirnt – bass, backing vocals
- Tré Cool – drums

Kerplunk! version

- Andy Ernst – production, engineering, mixing
- Green Day – production
- John Golden – mastering

Dookie version

- Rob Cavallo – production
- Green Day – production
- Jerry Finn – mixing
- Neill King – engineering
- Casey McCrankin – additional engineering

== Charts ==
Chart performance for "Welcome to Paradise"
Chart (1994)	Peak position
Australia (ARIA)	44
Finland Airplay (Suomen virallinen lista)	37
New Zealand (Recorded Music NZ)	21
Scottish Singles Sales (Official Charts)	19
UK Singles (Official Charts)	20
UK Rock & Metal (Official Charts)	17
US Radio Songs (Billboard)	56
US Alternative Airplay (Billboard)	7

== Certifications ==
Certifications and sales for "Welcome to Paradise"
Region	Certification	Certified units/sales
Canada (Music Canada)	Platinum	80,000^{‡}
New Zealand (RMNZ)	Gold	15,000^{‡}
United Kingdom (BPI)	Silver	200,000^{‡}
^{‡} Sales+streaming figures based on certification alone.

== Release history ==
Release dates and formats for "Welcome to Paradise"
Region	Date	Format(s)	Label(s)	Ref.
United Kingdom	October 17, 1994	12-inch vinyl; CD; cassette	Reprise	
Australia	April 10, 1995	CD; cassette	Reprise	
