= Longview (song) =

1994 single by Green Day

- Artwork for commercial overseas releases

Single by Green Day

from the album Dookie
- Released: February 1, 1994
- Studio: Music Grinder (Los Angeles, California)
- Genre: Punk rock; pop punk; alternative rock
- Length: 3:59
- Label: Reprise; WEA International
- Composer: Green Day
- Lyricist: Billie Joe Armstrong
- Producers: Rob Cavallo; Green Day

Green Day singles chronology
"Longview" (1994)	"Basket Case" (1994)

Audio sample
- file; help

Music video
- "Longview" on YouTube

"Longview" is a song by American rock band Green Day, released as their debut single. It is the fourth track on the band's third studio album, Dookie (1994). "Longview" was serviced to US radio on February 1, 1994, and was physically released on May 23, 1994. The song was the band's first single to top the Billboard Modern Rock Tracks chart in the US. The music video for the song received heavy airplay on MTV and is largely credited for breaking Green Day into mainstream popularity. It was directed by Bay Area music video director Mark Kohr, who later collaborated with the band on future music videos.

In 1995, Green Day received four Grammy Award nominations, including Best Hard Rock Performance for "Longview". The song was ranked at number three on the list of the "Best Singles of 1994" by Rolling Stone.

== Concept ==
The song describes intense boredom and frustration with an inability to self-actualize. Lyrically, the song is about a day spent sitting around the house, doing absolutely nothing of importance and masturbating until the days are no longer fun. Bassist Mike Dirnt has stated that the famous bass line intro to this song was written one night while he was high on LSD/Acid.

Billie Joe Armstrong would later feel guilty about the "My mother says to get a job, but she don't like the one she's got" line, because it's actually a lie; his mother, a waitress, actually did like her job, and continued to serve diners long after the point at which her son could pay for her lifestyle.

The song is named after the city of Longview, Washington. The band's lead vocalist and guitarist, Billie Joe Armstrong, stated on Twitter, "Our friend/roadie Kaz Hope, suggested we call our song Longview because the 1st time we played [it] was in Longview Washington in spring 1992."

The band had planned their tour using booking tool BYOFL (Book Your Own Fucking Life) and hooked up with Cafe Forum, a venue in Longview, and/or a local band called the Jimmies who both offered a practice pad as a place to sleep for touring bands were listed in this Maximum Rock N Roll Zine's side project telephone directory and tour planning book which was published annually listing contacts and locations of possible places to crash and notes on how to DIY plan a tour for a punk band. This listed a local venue called the Cafe Forum which is where the band played. They were also on tour with Aaron Cometbus, drummer for Crimpshrine and author of Cometbus fanzine, a long going punkrock zine from the Berkeley scene, his handing out those zines acted to connect Berkeley punk with the broader DIY scene which paved the path for many many other bands to come.

== Reception ==
Upon the release, Music & Media wrote, "Some 15 Years after the US intelligentsia embraced the Clash's 'London Calling', the whole nation falls for punk. Hearing it, you wonder why it didn't fall for the Wonderstuff's 'Size of a Cow'." In 2005, Entertainment Weekly placed it among their favorite Green Day songs. Fidler from Spin said, "Anyone who can cheer you up with lines like Call me pathetic/Call me what you will... When masturbation's lost it's [sic] fun/You're fucking lonely is okay in my book." In 2012, PopMatters listed "Longview" as the seventh best Green Day song, citing "This song didn’t become an instant classic of its genre merely because Armstrong said the word "masturbation" on the radio—it's all in the delivery."

== Music video ==
"Longview" has a music video, which is the first one created by Green Day. The music video was directed by Mark Kohr, the cinematography was by Adam Beckman, and the editing was by Bob Sarles. The music video received frequent airplay on MTV upon release.

The music video takes place in a dimly-lit basement of a broken-down house in Oakland, California, where the band used to live. The band members say that the look was intentionally grungy. In the video, Billie sits on a couch and watches television. At the end of the music video, he goes insane and tears up the couch, with feathers flying everywhere.

The music video was nominated for three MTV Video Music Awards in 1994: Best Group Video, Best Alternative Video, and Best New Artist. It was also nominated for Maximum Impact Clip of the Year at the 1994 Billboard Music Video Awards. The video is included on the DVD International Supervideos!.

== Track listings ==
All lyrics are written by Billie Joe Armstrong; all music is composed by Green Day; except where noted.

First Pressing
No.	Title	Music	Length
1.	"Longview"		3:59
2.	"Going to Pasalacqua (Live at Jannus Landing, St. Petersburg, Florida, March 11, 1994)"	Billie Joe Armstrong, Mike Dirnt, John Kiffmeyer	4:13
3.	"F.O.D. (Live at Jannus Landing, St. Petersburg, Florida, March 11, 1994)"		2:44
4.	"Christie Rd. (Live at Jannus Landing, St. Petersburg, Florida, March 11, 1994)"		3:49

1995 re-issue
No.	Title	Length
1.	"Longview"	3:59
2.	"Welcome to Paradise (Live at Jannus Landing, St. Petersburg, Florida, March 11, 1994)"	4:05
3.	"One of My Lies (Live at Jannus Landing, St. Petersburg, Florida, March 11, 1994)"	2:25

Card Sleeve
No.	Title	Length
1.	"Longview"	3:59
2.	"On the Wagon"	2:48
3.	"F.O.D. (Live at Jannus Landing, St. Petersburg, Florida, March 11, 1994)"	2:44

== Personnel ==
- Lead vocals and guitar: Billie Joe Armstrong
- Backing vocals and bass: Mike Dirnt
- Drums: Tré Cool
- Lyrics: Billie Joe Armstrong
- Music: Green Day
- Production: Rob Cavallo, Green Day

== Charts ==
=== Weekly charts ===
Weekly chart performance for "Longview"
Chart (1994–1995)	Peak position
Australia (ARIA)	33
Scottish Singles Sales (Official Charts)	32
UK Singles (Official Charts)	30
UK Rock & Metal (Official Charts)	3
US Radio Songs (Billboard)	36
US Alternative Airplay (Billboard)	1
US Mainstream Rock Airplay (Billboard)	13
US Cash Box Top 100	87

=== Year-end charts ===
Year-end chart performance for "Longview"
Chart (1994)	Position
US Modern Rock Tracks (Billboard)	3

== Certifications ==
Certifications and sales for "Longview"
Region	Certification	Certified units/sales
Canada (Music Canada)	Platinum	80,000^{‡}
New Zealand (RMNZ)	Gold	15,000^{‡}
United Kingdom (BPI)	Silver	200,000^{‡}
^{‡} Sales+streaming figures based on certification alone.

== Release history ==
Release dates and formats for "Longview"
Region	Date	Format(s)	Label(s)	Ref.
United States	February 1, 1994	College; modern rock radio	Reprise	
United States	March 14, 1994	Album rock radio	Reprise	
Australia	May 23, 1994	CD; cassette	Reprise	
United Kingdom	June 6, 1994	7-inch vinyl; CD; cassette	Reprise	
United Kingdom (re-release)	March 6, 1995	7-inch vinyl; CD; cassette	Reprise	
