= Mike Dirnt =

American rock musician (born 1972)

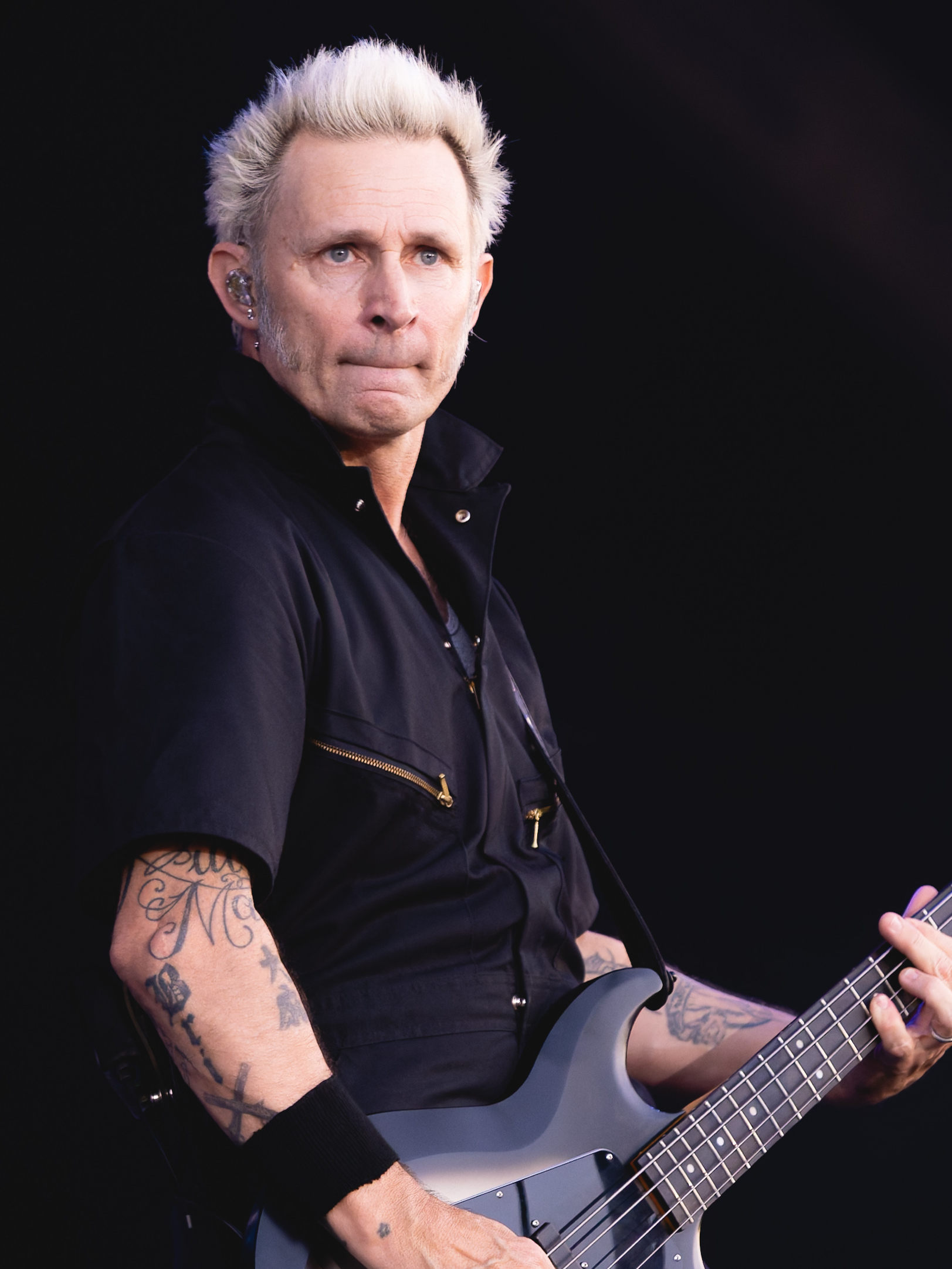
- Dirnt performing with Green Day in 2024

Background information
- Also known as: Van Gough; Michaelangelo
- Born: Michael Ryan Pritchard; May 4, 1972 (age 54); Oakland, California, U.S.
- Genres: Punk rock; pop-punk; garage rock; alternative rock
- Occupations: Musician; songwriter; singer
- Instruments: Bass; vocals; guitar
- Years active: 1986–present
- Member of: Green Day; The Network; Foxboro Hot Tubs
- Formerly of: Screeching Weasel
- Spouses: Anastasia Serman (m. 1996; div. 1999); Sarah Garrity (m. 2004; div. 2004); Brittney Cade (m. 2009)

Michael Ryan Pritchard (born May 4, 1972), better known by his stage name Mike Dirnt, is an American rock musician who is the co-founder, bassist, backing vocalist, and occasional lead vocalist of Green Day.

== Early life and education ==
Michael Ryan Pritchard was born in Oakland, California, on May 4, 1972. He was adopted. As a child, his father was often away obtaining a degree, while his mother stayed at home to care for him and his sister Myla.

After an argument between his parents led to a call to the police, the couple divorced. His mother and sister moved to Rodeo, California, while he stayed in El Sobrante, California, with his father. However, missing his mother, he eventually moved in with her and Myla. Having been previously described as bright and fearless, Dirnt became sullen and withdrawn after the divorce.

In the cafeteria in Carquinez Middle School, ten-year-old Pritchard met Billie Joe Armstrong, with whom he bonded instantly. Armstrong began to play guitar with Mike, and the two spent time together at Armstrong's house learning songs by the Ramones, Ozzy Osbourne, Def Leppard, Hüsker Dü, AC/DC, Lynyrd Skynyrd, the Replacements, the Who, and Van Halen.

After attending Salesian High School, an all-boys Catholic school, for his freshman year of high school, Pritchard transferred to Pinole Valley High School. Armstrong had recently transferred to Pinole Valley as well. Pritchard's family struggled with financial troubles; in an effort to help out, he worked as a chef at Nantucket, a seafood restaurant in Crockett. He eventually saved enough money to purchase a used pickup truck that he and Armstrong often drove to Berkeley; there, they attended shows at 924 Gilman Street, an influential DIY punk club. Despite their small physiques, the pair got jobs as security guards at the club. Dirnt later recalled, "We lived and died for that place. At that time, it meant everything."

Dirnt's mother struggled to provide for him and his sister as a single parent and eventually had to leave Rodeo in 1987 to look for work. Armstrong and Dirnt convinced each other's parents to allow Dirnt to move into Armstrong's garage.

Dirnt often brought his bass to school, and the plucking noise of the unamplified strings led classmates to jokingly call him by the onomatopoeia "Dirnt".

Dirnt graduated from high school in 1990.

== Career ==
While at Pinole Valley High School, Dirnt and classmate Armstrong formed a band called Sweet Children in 1986.

After drummer John Kiffmeyer, who was also known as Al Sobrante, joined the group and replaced original drummer Raj Punjabi, Sweet Children began performing at 924 Gilman Street. The band performed several well-received sets, which encouraged Armstrong to drop out of high school to focus his energy on music. Dirnt, however, worried that he needed a backup plan and continued his studies.

Bass player Sean Hughes, who was not as dedicated to the group as the other members, left Sweet Children, leaving Dirnt to play bass. After changing its name to Green Day in 1989, the band recorded its debut album, 39/Smooth, over the 1989 Christmas holiday break. Green Day went on its first van tour in June 1990, leaving the day that Dirnt graduated from high school.

At Woodstock '94, Green Day started an infamous mud fight, during which several fans invaded the stage. Overwhelmed by the chaotic situation, concert security mistook the mud-soaked Dirnt for a fan and tackled him, knocking out one of his teeth. Dirnt required emergency orthodontia due to this incident.

While performing at the 1998 KROQ Weenie Roast in Irvine, California, Third Eye Blind bassist Arion Salazar ran onstage and "bear-hugged" Dirnt, who was caught off-guard. The incident escalated into an on-stage scuffle before security escorted Salazar away. After the performance, Dirnt confronted Salazar backstage, and as the two argued, a beer bottle struck Dirnt in the head, causing a small fracture in his skull. Eyewitnesses later attributed the bottle-throwing to a fan of Third Eye Blind, though this was disputed by another eyewitness on the following day's Loveline broadcast. Salazar and the band's management soon released a statement: "I am sorry that my attempt at doing something I thought would be funny escalated into Mike getting hurt. That was never my intention. I simply had too much to drink and made a very bad decision. If I had been in Mike's place, I am sure I would have acted similarly. My heart goes out to him and I hope he recovers quickly."

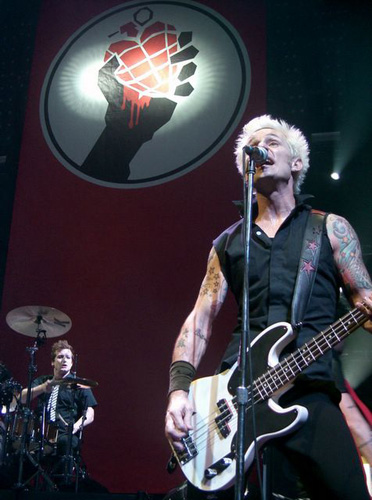
Dirnt performing in 2006

In 2012, during the iHeartRadio Music Festival, Dirnt and Armstrong smashed their respective bass and guitar after Armstrong became agitated onstage and ranted about Green Day's set being cut short.

On April 18, 2015, Dirnt and his Green Day band mates were inducted into the Rock and Roll Hall of Fame in their first year of eligibility.

In 2024, Dirnt performed on Green Day's fourteenth studio album, Saviors. In an interview in bass magazine, he described the album as a return to working with producer Rob Cavallo and discussed developing a bass sound that could remain distinct within the band's guitar arrangements.

In 2024, Dirnt also performed with The Coverups, a side project led by Billie Joe Armstrong that plays cover versions of songs by other artists. The group performed a series of small club shows, including dates in London that year.

On May 1, 2025, Dirnt and his Green Day bandmates received a star in the Hollywood Walk of Fame.

=== Songwriting and lead vocals ===
Although Armstrong is Green Day's main lyricist, Dirnt has written lyrics for "Emenius Sleepus", "J.A.R. (Jason Andrew Relva)", "Scumbag", "Ha Ha You're Dead", the subtrack "Nobody Likes You" from the medley "Homecoming", and the B-side "Governator". He also co-wrote the lyrics to "Best Thing in Town", "The One I Want", and "Panic Song" with Armstrong. Dirnt writes all the bass lines for Green Day songs. He composed the introduction to "Desensitized" using a baseball bat and an old cathode ray tube television.

Dirnt sings lead vocals on "Governator", part of the third verse of "Outsider" on the Shenanigans album, and the "Nobody Likes You" subtrack of "Homecoming".

=== Musicianship ===
Originally a guitar player, Dirnt switched to bass when Green Day became a power trio. Despite the change, he retained the dexterity and speed typical of guitar players, embellishing his basslines with fills, higher-fret runs, and quick pull-offs. In a 1994 interview with Bass Player, Dirnt stated that he had no specific influences. He added that had never sat down and worked out the bass parts from another artist's album, as doing so "might have influenced me a little too much. I think my method has helped me to formulate my own style." Dirnt plays with a pick. Unlike most other bassists, he uses his arm more than his wrist. He said, "I try to be percussive with my right hand, finding something that has its own motor, with a bounce to it. I think it's all the little 'ands' and in-between notes that create a solid rhythm."

Dirnt prefers a "warm and round" bass tone with enough upper midrange to contend with Armstrong's guitar tone. He primarily recorded Dookie with a 1985 Fender Precision Bass. Dirnt has used a mid-1970s Gibson G3 for songs like "Longview", the walking bassline of which was inspired by Dirnt's interest in jazz. Between Warning and American Idiot, Dirnt developed a signature model bass with Fender. The Mike Dirnt Precision Bass was primarily inspired by the original 1951 Precision Bass design; however, it incorporated design elements from later Precision Bass years such as 1955-era arm contours, a 1959-style pickup, and a 1969-style C-shaped neck. All of Dirnt's basses are strung with .045–.105 gauge Fender Super 7250 roundwounds.

For most of the 1990s and early 2000s, Dirnt favored Yamaha G100 amplifier heads through 6×10 Mesa/Boogie cabinets. However, he has also incorporated other amps into his rig at different times, including models from Ampeg and Sunn. He switched to Fender amps in 2003, using Bassman Pro and TB-1200 heads with 8×10 Pro cabs. In 2010, Dirnt helped develop an updated Super Bassman model; it has since become his main amplifier. In 2025, Epiphone released a Mike Dirnt signature Grabber G-3 bass, based on the model he had used extensively during his career.

== Personal life and other endeavors ==
Dirnt's biological mother died on January 9, 2013. Dirnt met her for the first time one month before her death.

Dirnt married his first wife, Anastasia Serman, in 1996; they divorced in 1999. Serman and Dirnt have a daughter, Estelle Desiree, born on December 20, 1996. Dirnt won full custody of his daughter in the summer of 2008 and took her to live in Oakland.

In 2004, he married girlfriend Sarah Garrity in a private villa in Puerto Vallarta, Mexico. The two divorced that same year.

On March 14, 2009, he married Brittney Cade in a private ceremony in Brittney's hometown of Ojai, California. Dirnt has two children with Cade: a son, Brixton Michael (born October 11, 2008), and a daughter, Ryan Ruby Mae (born November 29, 2010).

Dirnt is a Star Wars fan; he stated jokingly in an interview that he bases "most of his religious beliefs" on Star Wars. His birthday is on Star Wars Day. Dirnt's favorite bass player was Cliff Burton.

In July 2014, it was announced that Dirnt would co-produce the Indie film Crickets, with Green Day manager Pat Magnarella.

In December 2015, Dirnt along with Billie Joe Armstrong announced that they would launch a coffee company, Oakland Coffee Works (which has since been rebranded to Punk Bunny Coffee). The company sells organic coffee beans and is the first company to exclusively use 100% compostable bags and pods.

== Discography ==
=== Green Day ===
- 39/Smooth (1990) – bass guitar, backing vocals
- Kerplunk! (1991) – bass guitar, backing vocals
- Dookie (1994) – bass guitar, backing vocals
- Insomniac (1995) – bass guitar, backing vocals
- Nimrod (1997) – bass guitar, backing vocals, baseball bat (as written in the album's liner notes)
- Warning (2000) – bass guitar, backing vocals, Farfisa on "Misery"
- American Idiot (2004) – bass guitar, backing vocals, lead vocals on "Nobody Likes You" and the deluxe bonus track "Governator"
- 21st Century Breakdown (2009) – bass guitar, backing vocals, lead vocals on "Modern World"
- ¡Uno! (2012) – bass guitar, backing vocals
- ¡Dos! (2012) – bass guitar, backing vocals
- ¡Tré! (2012) – bass guitar, backing vocals and lead vocals on part of "Sex, Drugs and Violence"
- Revolution Radio (2016) – bass guitar, backing vocals
- Father of All Motherfuckers (2020) – bass guitar
- Saviors (2024) – bass guitar, backing vocals

=== Foxboro Hot Tubs ===
- Stop Drop and Roll!!! (2008) – bass guitar, vocals

=== The Network ===
- Money Money 2020 (2003) – lead vocals, bass guitar, backing vocals (as Van Gough)
- Money Money 2020 Part II: We Told Ya So! (2020) – lead vocals, bass guitar, backing vocals (as Van Gough)

=== Screeching Weasel ===
- How to Make Enemies and Irritate People (1994) – bass, backing vocals
- "Suzanne Is Getting Married" (single) (1994) – bass and backing vocals on track 1

=== Squirtgun ===
- Squirtgun (1995) – bass and backing vocals on "Make It Up"

=== Other media appearances ===
- King of the Hill – (TV series – 1997) – teenager
- Riding in Vans with Boys (film – 2003) – himself
- Live Freaky! Die Freaky! (film – 2006)
- The Simpsons Movie (film – 2007) – himself
- Heart Like a Hand Grenade (film – 2008) – himself
- Green Day: Rock Band (video game – 2010) – himself (Voice, likeness, and archive footage)
- ¡Cuatro! (film – 2013) as himself
- Broadway Idiot (film – 2013) as himself
- Nimrods (film – 2026) as himself

== Bibliography ==
- Spitz, Marc (2006). Nobody Likes You: Inside the Turbulent Life, Times, and Music of Green Day. Hyperion. ISBN 1-4013-0274-2.
- Myers, Ben (2006). Green Day - American Idiots & The New Punk Explosion. The Disinformation Company Ltd. ISBN 978-1932857-32-0.
