= Green Day discography =

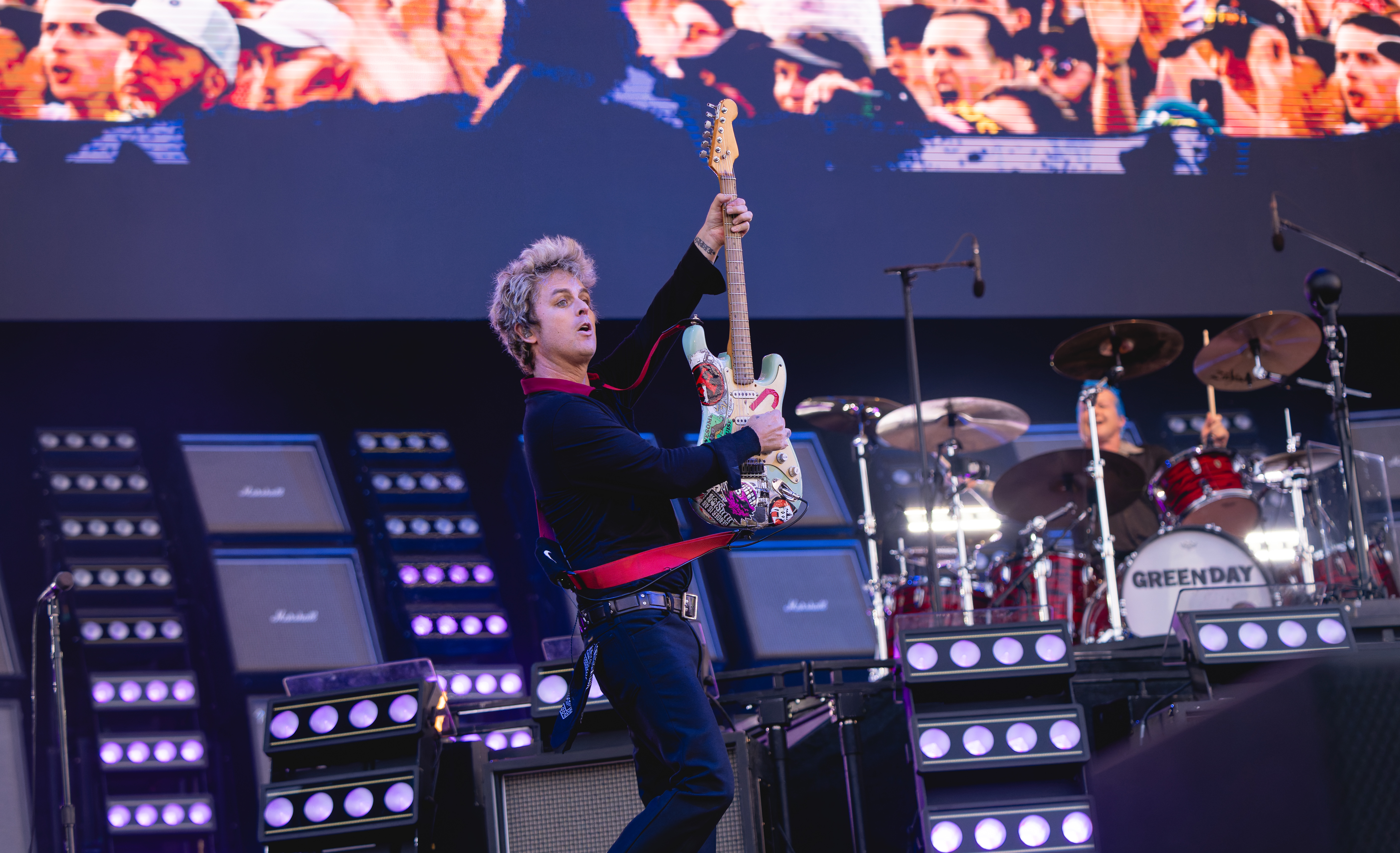
- Green Day performing live at the Isle of Wight Festival, 2024
- Studio albums: 14
- Extended plays: 12
- Soundtrack albums: 1
- Live albums: 4
- Compilation albums: 4
- Singles: 50
- Video albums: 4
- Music videos: 61
- Promotional singles: 23
- Anniversaries: 4

The American rock band Green Day has released 14 studio albums, four live albums, four compilation albums, two soundtrack albums, four video albums, 12 extended plays, 4 box sets, 48 singles, 10 promotional singles, 4 anniversaries, and 56 music videos. The band has sold over 75 million records worldwide, including more than 34 million in certified album sales in the United States. Green Day released their first two studio albums, 1,039/Smoothed Out Slappy Hours (1991) (consisting of the original 39/Smooth as well as their first two EPs 1,000 Hours and Slappy) and Kerplunk (1991), through the independent label Lookout! Records before signing to major label Reprise Records. Dookie, the band's first album on the label and third studio album overall, was released in February 1994. It was a breakout success, selling over 10 million copies in the United States and 20 million copies worldwide. Dookie spawned five singles, including the international hits "Longview", "Basket Case" and "When I Come Around". The album placed Green Day at the forefront of the 1990s punk rock revival.

Insomniac, the band's fourth studio album, was released in October 1995. While not as successful as Dookie, the album managed to peak at number two on the US Billboard 200 and received a double platinum certification from the Recording Industry Association of America (RIAA). Nimrod followed in October 1997; it peaked at number ten on the Billboard 200. Four singles were released from Nimrod; the most successful of these was "Good Riddance (Time of Your Life)", which hit the top ten in countries such as Australia and Canada. The band's sixth studio album Warning was released in October 2000 to mild commercial success, peaking at number four on the Billboard 200 and only earning a gold certification from the RIAA.

Their seventh studio album American Idiot reignited the band's popularity with a younger generation. Becoming the band's first album to top the Billboard 200, American Idiot sold over seven million copies in the United States, including more than 14 million copies worldwide. The album spawned five commercially successful singles: "American Idiot", "Jesus of Suburbia", "Boulevard of Broken Dreams", "Holiday", and "Wake Me Up When September Ends". A Broadway musical was created based on the album.

The band's eighth studio album, 21st Century Breakdown, followed in May 2009, topping the Billboard 200 and being certified double platinum by the RIAA. Two singles from the album—"Know Your Enemy" and "21 Guns"—became top 40 hits on the US Billboard Hot 100. A trilogy of studio albums—¡Uno!, ¡Dos!, and ¡Tré!—were released toward the end of 2012. ¡Uno!, ¡Dos! and ¡Tré! peaked at numbers two, nine and thirteen, respectively, on the Billboard 200. ¡Uno! received a gold certification from the RIAA. In 2016, another studio album, Revolution Radio, was released and topped the Billboard 200. That album was followed by Father of All, which was released in 2020 and debuted in the top five of the Billboard 200 and topped the Australian, Canadian and UK charts in its first week. The band released their most recent album, Saviors, in January 2024.

== Albums ==
=== Studio albums ===
List of studio albums, with selected chart positions, sales figures and certifications
Title	Album details	Peak chart positions										Sales	Certifications
Title	Album details	US	AUS	AUT	CAN	GER	IRL	NZ	SWE	SWI	UK	Sales	Certifications
39/Smooth	Released: April 13, 1990 (US); Label: Lookout!; Formats: CS, LP	— (Note: 39/Smooth never entered the United States Billboard 200, but reached four on the Top Catalog Albums chart.)	—	—	—	—	—	—	—	—	—		
Kerplunk	Released: December 17, 1991 (US); Label: Lookout!; Formats: CD, CS, LP	— (Note: Kerplunk never entered the United States [Billboard 200, but reached one on the Top Catalog Albums chart.)	186	—	—	—	—	—	—	—	—	US: 1,000,000	RIAA: Platinum; BPI: Gold
Dookie	Released: February 1, 1994 (US) (Note: An expanded box set for the album's was released on September 29, 2023 for the album's 30th anniversary, including outtakes, demos, and two live concert recordings.); Label: Reprise; Formats: CD, CS, LP	2	1	4	1	4	38	1	3	6	13	US: 20,000,000; UK: 1,010,000	RIAA: 2× Diamond; ARIA: 5× Platinum; BPI: 3× Platinum; BVMI: 3× Gold; IFPI AUT: Platinum; IFPI SWE: Gold; IFPI SWI: Gold; IRMA: 4× Platinum; MC: Diamond; RMNZ: 4× Platinum
Insomniac	Released: October 10, 1995 (US) (Note: An expanded version was released on March 19, 2021 for the album's 25th anniversary, including previously unreleased live tracks.); Label: Reprise; Formats: CD, CS, LP	2	5	2	2	12	—	5	5	8	8		RIAA: 2× Platinum; ARIA: Platinum; BPI: Platinum; BVMI: Gold; IFPI AUT: Gold; MC: 2× Platinum; RMNZ: Platinum
Nimrod	Released: October 14, 1997 (US) (Note: An expanded reissue was released on January 27, 2023 for the album's 25th anniversary, featuring a live album and previously unheard demos.); Label: Reprise; Formats: CD, CS, LP	10	3	28	4	31	34	22	36	33	11		RIAA: 2× Platinum; ARIA: 3× Platinum; BPI: Platinum; MC: 4× Platinum; RMNZ: Gold
Warning	Released: October 3, 2000 (US); Label: Reprise; Formats: CD, CS, LP	4	7	14	2	21	13	20	25	11	4		RIAA: Gold; ARIA: Platinum; BPI: Platinum; MC: Platinum; RMNZ: Gold
American Idiot	Released: September 21, 2004 (US) (Note: An expanded box set for the album was released on October 25, 2024 for the album's 25th anniversary, featuring B-sides, bonus songs, and previously unreleased demos and live tracks.); Label: Reprise; Formats: CD, CS, LP, digital download	1	1	1	1	3	1	2	1	1	1	US: 6,200,000; UK: 2,600,000	RIAA: 6× Platinum; ARIA: 6× Platinum; BPI: 9× Platinum; BVMI: 4× Platinum; IFPI AUT: 2× Platinum; IFPI SWE: Platinum; IFPI SWI: 2× Platinum; IRMA: 8× Platinum; MC: Diamond; RMNZ: 7× Platinum
21st Century Breakdown	Released: May 15, 2009 (US); Label: Reprise; Formats: CD, LP, digital download	1	2	1	1	1	2	1	1	1	1	UK: 484,000	RIAA: Platinum; ARIA: Platinum; BPI: Platinum; BVMI: 3× Gold; IFPI AUT: Platinum; IFPI SWE: Gold; IFPI SWI: Platinum; IRMA: Platinum; MC: 3× Platinum; RMNZ: 2× Platinum
¡Uno!	Released: September 25, 2012 (US); Label: Reprise; Formats: CD, LP, digital download	2	3	1	3	3	3	2	3	4	2	US: 625,000; UK: 125,531	BPI: Gold; BVMI: Gold; IFPI AUT: Gold; MC: Platinum
¡Dos!	Released: November 13, 2012 (US); Label: Reprise; Formats: CD, LP, digital download	9	10	3	12	4	11	5	10	8	10	US: 175,000; UK: 91,870	BPI: Gold
¡Tré!	Released: December 11, 2012 (US); Label: Reprise; Formats: CD, LP, digital download	13	22	8	22	17	37	16	30	14	31	US: 155,000; UK: 62,457	BPI: Silver
Revolution Radio	Released: October 7, 2016 (US); Label: Reprise; Formats: CD, CS, LP, digital download	1	2	4	1	2	1	1	2	2	1	US: 118,000	BPI: Gold
Father of All Motherfuckers	Released: February 7, 2020; Label: Reprise; Formats: CD, LP, digital download	4	1	2	1	2	4	5	19	1	1	US: 42,000	
Saviors	Released: January 19, 2024; Label: Reprise; Formats: CD, CS, LP, digital download	4	2	2	4	2	2	6	46	3	1	US: 108,000	BPI: Silver
"—" denotes a recording that did not chart or was not released in that territory.

=== Live albums ===
List of live albums, with selected chart positions and certifications
Title	Album details	Peak chart positions										Certifications
Title	Album details	US	AUS	AUT	CAN	GER	HUN	JPN	NZ	SWE	UK	Certifications
Bullet in a Bible	Released: November 15, 2005 (US); Label: Reprise; Formats: CD, LP, digital download	8	8	5	3	7	38	11	5	7	6	ARIA: Platinum; BPI: Platinum; BVMI: Gold; IFPI AUT: Gold; IFPI SWE: Gold; RMNZ: Platinum
Awesome as Fuck	Released: March 22, 2011 (US); Label: Reprise; Formats: CD, LP, digital download	14	69	8	12	5	12	11	5	9	14	BPI: Gold; BVMI: Gold
Woodstock 1994	Released: April 13, 2019 (US); Label: Reprise; Formats: LP	156	—	—	—	—	—	—	—	—	—	
BBC Sessions	Released: December 10, 2021; Label: Reprise; Formats: CD, LP, digital download	— (Note: BBC Sessions never entered the United States Billboard 200, but reached 35 on the Top Album Sales chart.)	121	—	—	79	19	101	—	—	44	
"—" denotes a recording that did not chart or was not released in that territory.

=== Compilation albums ===
List of compilation albums, with selected chart positions, sales figures and certifications
Title	Album details	Peak chart positions										Sales	Certifications
Title	Album details	US	AUS	AUT	GER	IRL	ITA	JPN	NZ	SWI	UK	Sales	Certifications
1,039/Smoothed Out Slappy Hours	Released: October 1, 1991 (US); Label: Lookout!; Format: CD, Cassette	—	176	—	—	—	—	—	—	—	—	US: 632,000	RIAA: Gold; BPI: Gold
International Superhits!	Released: November 13, 2001 (US); Label: Reprise; Formats: CD, LP, Cassette	40	11	48	67	13	17	4	5	61	15	US: 1,200,000; UK: 888,000	RIAA: Platinum; ARIA: 3× Platinum; BPI: 3× Platinum; IRMA: 3× Platinum; MC: Gold; RIAJ: 2× Platinum; RMNZ: Gold
Shenanigans	Released: July 2, 2002 (US); Label: Reprise; Formats: CD, LP, Cassette	27	110	33	100	27	—	13	—	—	32	US: 183,000	BPI: Gold; RIAJ: Gold
Greatest Hits: God's Favorite Band	Released: November 17, 2017; Label: Reprise; Formats: CD, LP,	39	16	30	36	17	25	22	21	44	22		ARIA: 2× Platinum; BPI: 2× Platinum; RMNZ: 2× Platinum
"—" denotes a recording that did not chart or was not released in that territory.

=== Soundtrack albums ===
List of soundtrack albums, with selected chart positions
Title	Album details	Peak chart positions							
Title	Album details	US	US Cast	US Rock	AUT	GER	GRE	ITA	SWE
American Idiot: The Original Broadway Cast Recording (with the cast of American Idiot)	Released: April 20, 2010 (US); Label: Reprise; Formats: CD, LP, digital download	43	7	12	15	70	39	48	46
Nimrods Original Soundtrack	Released: July 31, 2026; Label: Reprise	TBD							

=== Demo albums ===
List of demo albums, with selected chart positions, sales figures and certifications
Title	Album details	Peak chart positions			
Title	Album details	US	US Rock	AUS	ITA
Demolicious	Released: April 19, 2014; Label: Reprise; Formats: CD, LP, CS	112	24	170	31

=== Video albums ===
List of video albums, with selected chart positions and certifications
Title	Album details	Peak chart positions			Certifications
Title	Album details	US Video	AUS DVD	FIN DVD	Certifications
International Supervideos!	Released: November 13, 2001 (US); Label: Warner; Formats: DVD, VHS	10	18	10	RIAA: Platinum; ARIA: Platinum
Bullet in a Bible	Released: November 15, 2005 (US); Label: Reprise; Formats: DVD, UMD, BD	1	—	—	
Awesome as Fuck	Released: March 22, 2011 (US); Label: Reprise; Formats: DVD, BD	—	—	—	
¡Cuatro!	Released: September 24, 2013 (US); Label: Reprise; Formats: DVD, BD	—	26	—	
"—" denotes a recording that did not chart or was not released in that territory.

=== Box sets ===
List of box sets, with selected chart positions, sales figures and certifications
Title	Album details	Peak chart positions								
Title	Album details	AUT	BEL (FL)	BEL (WA)	FIN	FRA	GER	ITA	SPA	SWI
The Green Day Collection	Released: December 22, 2009 (US); Label: Reprise; Format: DL	—	—	—	—	—	—	—	—	—
Ultimate Collection Singles Box Set	Released: December 26, 2009; Label: Reprise; Format: CD, DL, VL	—	—	—	—	—	—	—	—	—
The Studio Albums 1990–2009	Released: August 27, 2012 (US); Label: Reprise; Format: CD	62	116	49	44	120	49	49	92	96
Green Day	Released: 2012 (US); Label: Reprise; Format: CD	—	—	—	—	—	—	—	—	—
Uno... Dos... Tré!	Released: December 11, 2012 (US); Label: Reprise; Format: DL	—	—	—	—	—	—	—	—	—
"—" denotes a recording that did not chart or was not released in that territory.

== Extended plays ==
List of extended plays, with selected chart positions
Title	Extended play details	Peak chart positions		
Title	Extended play details	US	AUT	JPN
1,000 Hours	Released: May 26, 1989 (US); Label: Lookout!; Format: 7"	—	—	—
Slappy	Released: 1990 (US); Label: Lookout!; Format: 7"	—	—	—
Sweet Children	Released: August 1990 (US); Label: Skene!; Format: 7"	—	—	—
Live Tracks	Released: 1994 (JPN); Label: Reprise; Format: CD	—	—	—
Bowling Bowling Bowling Parking Parking	Released: July 25, 1996 (JPN); Label: Reprise; Format: CD, CS	—	34	42
Foot in Mouth (Note: Released as Explosion Live! +5 in Japan.)	Released: April 25, 1997 (JPN); Label: Reprise; Format: CD	—	—	45
Tune In, Tokyo...	Released: October 9, 2001 (JPN); Label: Reprise; Format: CD	—	—	29
Last Night on Earth: Live in Tokyo	Released: November 11, 2009 (JPN); Label: Reprise; Formats: CD, DL	198	—	31
21 Guns Live E.P.	Released: September 4, 2009 (AUS); Label: Reprise; Format: DL	—	—	—
Oh Love EP	Released: August 14, 2012 (US); Label: Reprise; Format: CD	—	—	—
Live at the Whisky	Released: February 21, 2020 (US); Label: Reprise; Format: 7"	—	—	—
Otis Big Guitar Mix	Released: April 3, 2020 (US); Label: Reprise; Format: DL	—	—	—
Live from Hella Mega	Released: September 2022 (US); Label: Reprise; Format: 7”	—	—	—
"—" denotes a recording that did not chart or was not released in that territory.

== Singles ==
=== 1990s ===
List of singles released in the 1990s, with selected chart positions and certifications, showing year released and album name
Title	Year	Peak chart positions										Certifications	Album
Title	Year	US Air.	US Alt.	AUS	CAN	GER	IRL	NLD	NZ	SWE	UK	Certifications	Album
"Longview"	1994	36	1	33	—	—	—	— (Note: "Longview" did not enter the Netherlands' Single Top 100 but peaked on the Netherlands' Single Tip Chart at number 3.)	—	—	30	BPI: Silver; MC: Platinum; RMNZ: Gold	Dookie
"Basket Case"	1994	26	1	85	12	18	11	39	21	3	7	BPI: 3× Platinum; BVMI: Platinum; MC: 6× Platinum; RMNZ: 3× Platinum	Dookie
"Welcome to Paradise"	1994	56	7	44	—	—	—	—	21	—	20	BPI: Silver; MC: Platinum; RMNZ: Gold	Dookie
"When I Come Around"	1995	6	1	7	3	45	—	33	4	28	27	RIAA: Gold; ARIA: Gold; BPI: Platinum; MC: 4× Platinum; RMNZ: 2× Platinum	Dookie
"J.A.R."	1995	22	1	—	63	—	—	—	—	—	—		Angus
"Geek Stink Breath"	1995	27	3	40	22	73	27	— (Note: "Geek Stink Breath" did not enter the Netherlands' Single Top 100 but peaked on the Netherlands' Single Tip Chart at number 14.)	11	28	16		Insomniac
"Stuck with Me"	1995	—	—	46	—	—	—	—	40	—	26		Insomniac
"Brain Stew" / "Jaded"	1996	35	3	88	35	—	—	—	—	—	28	BPI: Silver; RMNZ: Platinum	Insomniac
"Hitchin' a Ride"	1997	59	5	26	23	—	—	—	—	—	25	MC: Gold	Nimrod
"Good Riddance (Time of Your Life)"	1997	11	2	2 (Note: "Good Riddance (Time of Your Life)" and "Redundant" charted as a double A-side single in Australia. The singles also charted separately at numbers 44 and 50, respectively.)	5	—	30	—	40	—	11	RIAA: 5× Platinum; ARIA: 2× Platinum; BPI: 3× Platinum; MC: 6× Platinum; RMNZ: 4× Platinum	Nimrod
"Redundant"	1998	—	16	2	—	—	—	—	—	—	27	ARIA: 2× Platinum	Nimrod
"Nice Guys Finish Last"	1999	—	31	80	—	—	—	—	—	—	—		Nimrod
"—" denotes a recording that did not chart or was not released in that territory.

=== 2000s ===
List of singles released in the 2000s, with selected chart positions and certifications, showing year released and album name
Title	Year	Peak chart positions										Certifications	Album
Title	Year	US	US Alt.	AUS	CAN	GER	IRL	NLD	NZ	SWE	UK	Certifications	Album
"Minority"	2000	— (Note: "Minority" did not enter the Billboard Hot 100, but peaked at number one on the Bubbling Under Hot 100 chart, which acts as a 25-song extension to the Hot 100.)	1	29	—	—	43	—	39	—	18	BPI: Silver	Warning
"Warning"	2000	— (Note: "Warning" did not enter the Billboard Hot 100, but peaked at number 14 on the Bubbling Under Hot 100 Singles chart, which acts as a 25-song extension to the Hot 100.)	3	19	— (Note: "Warning" did not enter the Billboard Canadian Hot 100, but peaked at number 54 on the Canadian Airplay chart.)	—	46	—	37	—	27		Warning
"Waiting"	2001	—	26	—	—	—	—	—	—	—	34		Warning
"Poprocks & Coke"	2002	—	—	—	—	—	—	—	—	—	—		International Superhits!
"I Fought the Law" (The Clash cover)	2004	— (Note: "I Fought the Law" did not enter the Billboard Hot 100, but peaked at number 74 on the Digital Song Sales chart.)	—	—	—	—	—	—	—	—	—		Non-album single
"American Idiot"	2004	61	1	7	1	28	12	37	7	18	3	RIAA: Gold; ARIA: Gold; BPI: 3× Platinum; BVMI: Platinum; MC: 5× Platinum; RMNZ: 3× Platinum	American Idiot
"Boulevard of Broken Dreams"	2004	2	1	5	— (Note: "Boulevard of Broken Dreams" did not enter the Billboard Canadian Hot 100, but peaked at number 35 on the Canadian Digital Song Sales chart.)	13	2	25	5	2	5	RIAA: Gold; ARIA: Platinum; BPI: 2× Platinum; BVMI: Gold; MC: 6× Platinum; RMNZ: 4× Platinum	American Idiot
"Holiday"	2005	19	1	24	—	50	13	— (Note: "Holiday" did not enter the Netherlands Single Top 100 but peaked on the Dutch Tipparade Chart at number eight.)	13	25	11	RIAA: Platinum; BPI: Platinum; MC: 3× Platinum; RMNZ: Platinum	American Idiot
"Wake Me Up When September Ends"	2005	6	2	13	—	22	13	44	10	21	8	RIAA: Platinum; BPI: 2× Platinum; MC: 4× Platinum; RMNZ: 3× Platinum	American Idiot
"Jesus of Suburbia"	2005	—	27	24	—	76	26	—	26	—	17	BPI: Gold; MC: Platinum; RMNZ: Gold	American Idiot
"The Saints Are Coming" (with U2)	2006	51	22	1	— (Note: "The Saints Are Coming" did not enter the Billboard Canadian Hot 100, but peaked at number 1 on the Canadian Digital Song Sales chart.)	6	1	1	4	4	2		U218 Singles
"Working Class Hero"	2007	53	10	— (Note: "Working Class Hero" did not enter the Australian ARIA Singles Chart but peaked at number 46 on the ARIA Digital Track Chart.)	24	—	26	39	—	11	136		Instant Karma: The Amnesty International Campaign to Save Darfur
"The Simpsons Theme" (Danny Elfman cover)	2007	— (Note: "The Simpsons Theme" did not enter the Billboard Hot 100, but peaked at number six on the Bubbling Under Hot 100 Singles chart, which acts as a 25-song extension to the Hot 100.)	—	— (Note: "The Simpsons Theme" did not enter the Australian ARIA Singles Chart but peaked at number 31 on the ARIA Digital Track Chart.)	61	—	15	—	—	34	19		Non-album single
"Know Your Enemy"	2009	28	1	20	5	14	11	62	13	10	21	RIAA: Gold; BPI: Silver; RMNZ: Gold	21st Century Breakdown
"21 Guns"	2009	22	3	14	16	13	21	89	3	8	36	RIAA: Platinum; ARIA: Gold; BPI: Platinum; RMNZ: 2× Platinum	21st Century Breakdown
"East Jesus Nowhere"	2009	—	17	—	71	—	—	—	—	—	—		21st Century Breakdown
"21st Century Breakdown"	2009	—	—	—	—	71	—	— (Note: "21st Century Breakdown" did not enter the Netherlands' Single Top 100 but peaked on the Netherlands' TMF Superchart at number 3.)	—	—	—		21st Century Breakdown
"—" denotes a recording that did not chart or was not released in that territory.

=== 2010s ===
List of singles released in the 2010s, with selected chart positions and certifications, showing year released and album name
Title	Year	Peak chart positions										Certifications	Album
Title	Year	US	US Rock	AUS	CAN	GER	ITA	JPN	NLD	SWI	UK	Certifications	Album
"Last of the American Girls"	2010	—	34	—	—	45	—	—	— (Note: "Last of the American Girls" did not enter the Netherlands Single Top 100 but peaked on the Dutch Tipparade Chart at number four.)	—	—		21st Century Breakdown
"When It's Time"	2010	—	—	—	—	—	—	—	—	—	68		American Idiot: The Original Broadway Cast Recording
"Don't Want to Know If You Are Lonely" (Split single with Hüsker Dü)	2011	— (Note: "Don't Want to Know If You Are Lonely" did not enter the Billboard Hot 100, but peaked at number eight on the Hot Singles Sales chart.)	—	—	—	—	—	—	—	—	—		Non-album single
"Oh Love"	2012	97	1	—	45	44	25	5	88	65	—	FIMI: Gold	¡Uno!
"Kill the DJ"	2012	—	—	—	—	—	92	—	—	— (Note: "Kill the DJ" did not enter the Swiss Singles chart, but charted at number 79 on the Swiss Airplay chart.)	110		¡Uno!
"Let Yourself Go"	2012	—	29	—	—	—	57	—	99	—	136		¡Uno!
"Stray Heart"	2012	—	—	—	—	—	36	10	—	—	—	FIMI: Gold	¡Dos!
"X-Kid"	2013	—	— (Note: "X-Kid" did not enter the Hot Rock & Alternative Songs chart, but peaked at number 36 on the US Rock & Alternative Airplay chart.)	—	—	—	—	—	—	—	—		¡Tré!
"Xmas Time of the Year"	2015	—	—	—	—	—	—	—	—	—	—		Non-album single
"Bang Bang"	2016	— (Note: "Bang Bang" did not enter the Billboard Hot 100, but peaked at number four on the Bubbling Under Hot 100 Singles chart, which acts as a 25-song extension to the Hot 100.)	8	83	75	—	—	91	—	—	84		Revolution Radio
"Still Breathing"	2016	—	11	—	— (Note: "Still Breathing" did not enter the Billboard Canadian Hot 100, but peaked at number 49 on the Canadian All-format Airplay chart.)	—	—	—	—	— (Note: "Still Breathing" did not enter the Swiss Singles chart, but charted at number 79 on the Swiss Airplay chart.)	— (Note: "Still Breathing" did not enter the UK Singles Chart, but peaked at number 78 on the UK Singles Downloads Chart.)		Revolution Radio
"Revolution Radio"	2017	—	22	—	—	—	—	—	—	—	— (Note: "Revolution Radio" did not enter the UK Singles Chart, but peaked at number 85 on the UK Singles Downloads Chart.)		Revolution Radio
"Back in the USA"	2017	—	35	—	—	—	—	—	—	—	—		Greatest Hits: God's Favorite Band
"Father of All..."	2019	—	6	—	— (Note: "Father of All..." did not enter the Billboard Canadian Hot 100, but peaked at number 47 on the Canadian All-format Airplay chart.)	—	—	—	—	—	—		Father of All Motherfuckers
"—" denotes a recording that did not chart or was not released in that territory.

=== 2020s ===
List of singles released in the 2020s, with selected chart positions and certifications, showing year released and album name
Title	Year	Peak chart positions										Album
Title	Year	US Rock	BLR	CAN Rock	CZR	FIN Air.	GER DL	JPN Over.	NLD Air.	NZ Hot	UK Sales	Album
"Oh Yeah!"	2020	3	—	1	—	—	—	—	—	—	—	Father of All Motherfuckers
"Here Comes the Shock"	2021	—	—	—	—	—	—	—	—	—	—	Non-album singles
"Pollyanna"	2021	— (Note: "Pollyanna" did not enter the Hot Rock & Alternative Songs chart, but peaked at number 28 on the US Rock & Alternative Airplay chart.)	—	32	—	—	—	—	—	—	—	Non-album singles
"Rock and Roll All Nite (Live from Hella Mega)" (Kiss cover)	2021	—	—	—	—	—	—	—	—	—	—	Non-album singles
"Holy Toledo!"	2021	— (Note: "Holy Toledo!" did not enter the Hot Rock & Alternative Songs chart, but peaked at number 17 on the Alternative Digital Songs chart.)	—	—	—	—	—	—	—	—	—	Non-album singles
"The American Dream Is Killing Me"	2023	22	167	1	—	81	45	11	—	29	73	Saviors
"Look Ma, No Brains!"	2023	—	—	—	—	—	—	—	—	37	—	Saviors
"Dilemma"	2023	32	—	1	45	—	—	—	—	25	—	Saviors
"One Eyed Bastard"	2024	—	—	1	—	—	64	20	41	22	— (Note: "One Eyed Bastard" did not enter the UK Singles Chart, but peaked at number 92 on the UK Singles Downloads Chart.)	Saviors
"Bobby Sox"	2024	48	—	36	—	—	—	—	—	18	—	Saviors
"Smash It Like Belushi"	2025	—	—	—	—	—	— (Note: "Smash It Like Belushi" did not enter the German Singles Downloads Chart, but peaked at number 50 on the Germany Airplay Chart.)	14	—	—	—	Saviors (Édition de Luxe)
"Ballyhoo"	2025	—	—	—	—	—	—	—	—	31	—	Saviors (Édition de Luxe)
"—" denotes a recording that did not chart or was not released in that territory.

=== Promotional singles ===
Title	Year	Peak chart positions										Certifications	Album
Title	Year	US Air.	US Alt.	US Rock	CZ Rock	FIN	JPN	MEX Eng.	NZ Hot	POR	UK Rock	Certifications	Album
"She"	1995	41	5	— (Note: "She" did not enter the Hot Rock & Alternative Songs chart, but peaked at number 18 on the Mainstream Rock chart.)	—	—	—	—	—	—	—	MC: Gold	Dookie
"86"	1995	—	—	—	—	—	—	—	—	—	—		Insomniac
"Walking Contradiction"	1996	70	21	— (Note: "Walking Contradiction" did not enter the Hot Rock & Alternative Songs chart, but peaked at number 25 on the Mainstream Rock chart.)	—	—	—	—	—	—	—		Insomniac
"Prosthetic Head"	1998	—	—	—	—	—	—	—	—	—	—		Nimrod
"Blood, Sex and Booze"	2001	—	—	—	—	—	—	—	—	—	—		Warning
"Macy's Day Parade"	2001	—	—	—	—	—	—	—	—	—	—		Warning
"Maria"	2001	—	—	—	—	—	—	—	—	—	—		International Superhits!
"Ha Ha You're Dead"	2002	—	—	—	—	—	—	—	—	—	—		Shenanigans
"Before the Lobotomy"	2009	—	—	—	—	—	—	—	—	—	—		21st Century Breakdown
"Peacemaker"	2009	—	—	—	—	24	—	—	—	—	—		21st Century Breakdown
"Restless Heart Syndrome"	2009	—	—	—	—	—	—	—	—	—	—		21st Century Breakdown
"Cigarettes and Valentines" (live)	2011	—	—	—	20	—	—	—	—	—	—		Awesome as Fuck
"21 Guns" (live)	2011	—	—	—	—	—	—	40	—	—	—		Awesome as Fuck
"Nuclear Family"	2012	—	—	—	—	—	—	—	—	—	—		¡Uno!
"Fell for You"	2012	—	—	—	—	—	—	—	—	—	—		¡Uno!
"Stop When the Red Lights Flash"	2012	—	—	—	—	—	—	—	—	—	—		¡Dos!
"Amy"	2012	—	—	—	—	—	—	—	—	—	—		¡Dos!
"The Forgotten"	2012	—	—	—	—	—	11	—	—	36	39		¡Tré!
"8th Avenue Serenade"	2012	—	—	—	—	—	—	—	—	—	—		¡Tré!
"99 Revolutions"	2012	—	—	—	—	—	—	—	—	—	—		¡Tré!
"Fire, Ready, Aim"	2019	—	— (Note: "Fire, Ready, Aim" did not enter the Alternative Songs chart, but peaked at number 17 on the Alternative Digital Songs chart.)	33	—	—	—	—	—	—	26		Father of All Motherfuckers
"Meet Me on the Roof"	2020	—	—	21	6	—	—	—	36	—	12		Father of All Motherfuckers
"Dreaming" (Blondie cover)	2020	—	—	—	—	—	—	—	—	—	—		Non-album single
"Corvette Summer"	2024	—	—	—	—	—	—	—	—	—	—		Saviors
"I'm Never Gonna R.I.P."	2026	—	—	—	—	—	—	—	—	—	—		Nimrods Original Soundtrack
"—" denotes a recording that did not chart or was not released in that territory.

== Other charted songs ==
List of songs, with selected chart positions, showing year released and album name
Title	Year	Peak chart positions					Album
Title	Year	HUN	MEX Eng.	NZ Hot	PHL	UK Rock	Album
"Christie Road"	1991	—	—	—	—	40	Kerplunk
"Letterbomb"	2004	—	—	—	—	32	American Idiot
"Lights Out"	2009	—	—	—	—	25	"Know Your Enemy" single
"Hearts Collide"	2009	—	—	—	—	26	"Know Your Enemy" single
"Last Night on Earth"	2009	—	7	—	86	—	21st Century Breakdown
"Paper Lanterns / 2000 Light Years Away"	2011	—	—	—	—	39	Awesome as Fuck
"Missing You"	2014	4	—	—	—	—	¡Tré!
"Youngblood"	2016	—	—	—	—	20	Revolution Radio
"Somewhere Now"	2016	—	—	—	—	23	Revolution Radio
"Say Goodbye"	2016	—	—	—	—	26	Revolution Radio
"Bouncing Off the Wall"	2016	—	—	—	—	34	Revolution Radio
"Outlaws"	2016	—	—	—	—	36	Revolution Radio
"I Was a Teenage Teenager"	2020	—	—	—	—	33	Father of All Motherfuckers
"1981"	2024	—	—	39	—	—	Saviors
"Goodnight Adeline"	2024	—	—	40	—	—	Saviors
"—" denotes a recording that did not chart or was not released in that territory.

== Other appearances ==
List of non-single guest appearances, showing year released and album name
Title	Year	Album
"Sweet Home Alabama"	1994	Gilman Street Block Party
"Eye of the Tiger"	1994	Gilman Street Block Party
"Rock You Like a Hurricane"	1994	Gilman Street Block Party
"When I Come Around" (live)	1994	Woodstock '94
"Do Da Da"	1997	Generations I: A Punk Look at Human Rights
"The Ballad of Wilhelm Fink"	1999	Short Music for Short People
"When I Come Around" (live)	1999	Saturday Night Live, The Musical Performances Volume 2
"Private Hell" (featuring Iggy Pop)	2003	Skull Ring
"Supermarket" (featuring Iggy Pop)	2003	Skull Ring
"Favorite Son"	2004	Rock Against Bush, Vol. 2
"American Idiot" (live)	2005	Later... with Jools Holland – Even Louder
"Holiday"/"We Are the Champions" (live)	2005	Live 8 Berlin
"Boulevard of Broken Dreams" (live)	2006	Best of Later... with Jools Holland

=== Soundtracks ===
Films

List of songs included in various soundtracks
Title	Year	Album	Movie
"J.A.R. (Jason Andrew Relva)"	1995	International Superhits!	Angus
"2000 Light Years Away"	1995	Kerplunk	The Jerky Boys: The Movie
"Tired of Waiting for You"	1997	Shenanigans	Howard Stern: Private Parts
"Brain Stew (Godzilla remix)"	1998	Insomniac	Godzilla (1998 film)
"Nice Guys Finish Last"	1999	Nimrod	Varsity Blues
"Espionage"	1999	Shenanigans	Austin Powers: The Spy Who Shagged Me
"Scumbag"	2001	Shenanigans	American Pie 2
"Blood, Sex and Booze"	2001	Warning	Freddy Got Fingered
"Outsider"	2002	Shenanigans	The New Guy
"Holiday"	2004	American Idiot	Accepted
"21 Guns"	2009	21st Century Breakdown	Transformers II : Revenge of The Fallen
"Stop Drop and Roll"	2010	Stop Drop and Roll!!!	Get Him to the Greek
"99 Revolutions"	2012	¡Tré!	The Campaign
"The Forgotten"	2012	¡Tré!	The Twilight Saga: Breaking Dawn – Part 2
"Ordinary World"	2016	Revolution Radio	Ordinary World
"Holy Toledo!"	2021	N/A	Mark, Mary & Some Other People
"Good Riddance (Time of Your Life)"	2024	Nimrod	Deadpool & Wolverine

Video games

Title	Year	Album	Game
"American Idiot"	2004	American Idiot	Madden NFL 2005
"Holiday"	2005	American Idiot	Tony Hawk's American Wasteland
"Wake Me Up When September Ends"	2005	American Idiot	Madden NFL 06
"Know Your Enemy"	2009	21st Century Breakdown	NHL 10
Multiple songs	2010	Multiple	Green Day: Rock Band
"Oh Love"	2012	¡Uno!	Rock Band 3/Blitz
"Stop When the Red Lights Flash"	2012	¡Dos!	Need For Speed: Most Wanted '12
"X-Kid"	2014	¡Tré!	Rocksmith 2014 Edition
Multiple songs	2019	Multiple	Beat Saber
"Father of All..."	2021	Father of All Motherfuckers	Riders Republic
"Fire, Ready, Aim"	2021	Father of All Motherfuckers	Riders Republic
"Basket Case"	2024	Dookie	Fortnite
"Welcome to Paradise"	2024	Dookie	Fortnite
"When I Come Around"	2024	Dookie	Fortnite
"American Idiot"	2024	American Idiot	Fortnite
"Holiday"	2024	American Idiot	Fortnite
"Boulevard of Broken Dreams"	2024	American Idiot	Fortnite
"One Eyed Bastard"	2024	Saviors	NHL 25

== Music videos ==
List of music videos, showing year released and director
Title	Year	Director(s)
"Longview"	1994	Mark Kohr
"Welcome to Paradise"	1994	Robert Caruso
"Basket Case"	1994	Mark Kohr
"When I Come Around"	1994	Mark Kohr
"Geek Stink Breath"	1995	Mark Kohr
"Stuck with Me"	1995	Mark Kohr
"Brain Stew/Jaded"	1995	Kevin Kerslake
"Walking Contradiction"	1996	Roman Coppola
"Hitchin' a Ride"	1997	Mark Kohr
"Good Riddance (Time of Your Life)"	1997	Mark Kohr
"Redundant"	1998	Mark Kohr
"Nice Guys Finish Last"	1999	Evan Bernard
"Last Ride In"	1999	Lance Bangs
"Minority"	2000	Evan Bernard
"Warning"	2000	Francis Lawrence
"Waiting"	2001	Marc Webb
"Macy's Day Parade"	2001	Mark Kohr
"Poprocks & Coke"	2001	—N/a
"Maria"	2002	—N/a
"American Idiot"	2004	Samuel Bayer
"Holiday / Boulevard of Broken Dreams"	2005	Samuel Bayer
"Wake Me Up When September Ends"	2005	Samuel Bayer
"Jesus of Suburbia"	2005	Samuel Bayer
"The Saints Are Coming" (with U2)	2006	Chris Milk
"Working Class Hero"	2007	Samuel Bayer
"Know Your Enemy"	2009	Mathew Cullen
"21 Guns"	2009	Marc Webb
"East Jesus Nowhere"	2009	Chris Dugan, M. Douglas Silverstein
"21st Century Breakdown"	2009	Marc Webb
"Last of the American Girls"	2010	Marc Webb
"Cigarettes and Valentines"	2011	Chris Dugan
"Oh Love"	2012	Samuel Bayer
"Kill the DJ"	2012	Samuel Bayer
"Let Yourself Go" (live)	2012	Tim Wheeler, Farm League
"Nuclear Family"	2012	Farm League
"Stay the Night"	2012	Farm League
"Troublemaker"	2012	Farm League
"Stray Heart"	2012	Roboshobo
"The Forgotten"	2012	Bill Berg Hillinger
"Bang Bang"	2016	Tim Armstrong
"Still Breathing"	2016	P. R. Brown
"Revolution Radio"	2017	Greg Schneider, Chris Dugan
"Back in the USA"	2017	Brendan Walter, Greg Yagolnitzer
"2000 Light Years Away"	2017	—N/a
"Youngblood"	2018	Chris Curtis
"Father of All..."	2019	Hella Mega Unicorn
"Fire, Ready, Aim"	2019	—N/a
"Oh Yeah!"	2020	Malia James
"Meet Me on the Roof"	2020	Brendan Walter, Greg Yagolnitzer
"Dreaming"	2020	—N/a
"Here Comes the Shock"	2021	Hilken Mancini & Punk Rock Aerobics
"Pollyanna"	2021	Greg Schneider
"The American Dream Is Killing Me"	2023	Brendan Walter, Ryan Baxley
"Look Ma, No Brains!"	2023	Brendan Walter, Ryan Baxley
"Dilemma"	2023	Ryan Baxley
"Bobby Sox"	2024	Brendan Walter, Ryan Baxley
"Corvette Summer"	2024	Brendan Walter, Ryan Baxley
"One Eyed Bastard"	2025	Brendan Walter, Ryan Baxley
"Suzie Chapstick"	2025	Ryan Baxley, Alice Baxley
