= BBC Sessions (Green Day album) =

Live album by Green Day
- Released: December 10, 2021
- Recorded: June 1994–August 2001
- Studios: Maida Vale, London, England
- Genre: Punk rock
- Length: 48:27
- Labels: Reprise; BBC

Green Day chronology
Father of All Motherfuckers (2020)	BBC Sessions (2021)	Saviors (2024)

Singles from BBC Sessions
- 1. "Stuck with Me" Released: 12 November 2021; 2. "Walking Contradiction" Released: 19 November 2021; 3. "Hitchin' a Ride" Released: 26 November 2021; 4. "Waiting" Released: 3 December 2021

BBC Sessions is the fourth live album by American rock band Green Day, released on 10 December 2021, by Reprise Records. It consists of live recordings for the BBC from 1994 to 2001 held at the Maida Vale Studios in London. Many of the songs were commonly bootlegged until 2021. "One of My Lies" and "Scattered" from the 1998 session are the only songs not featured on the album.

== Critical reception ==
Professional ratings
Aggregate scores
Source	Rating
Metacritic	84/100
Review scores
Source	Rating
AllMusic	4/5 stars
Classic Rock	4/5 stars
Kerrang!	4/5 stars
Mojo	4/5 stars

At Metacritic, which assigns a normalized rating out of 100 from mainstream publications, the album received an average score of 84 based on four reviews, indicating "universal acclaim".

Writing for Ultimate Classic Rock, Gary Graff stated that BBC Sessions was "a welcome adjunct and a study in how consistently strong and exciting the group has been while handling changes – both subtle and dramatic – in its sound". Ian Winwood of Kerrang! rated the album four out of five stars, calling it a "collection of impossibly fluent songs delivered in momentary fashion".

== Track listing ==
Tracks 1–4 recorded on 8 June 1994, tracks 5–8 recorded on 11 March 1996, tracks 9–12 recorded on 2 February 1998, and tracks 13–16 recorded on 28 August 2001. All lyrics written by Billie Joe Armstrong; all music composed by Green Day except "2000 Light Years Away" (music by Green Day, Jesse Michaels, Rippinz, and Dave E.C.).

No.	Title	Length
1.	"She"	2:11
2.	"When I Come Around"	2:52
3.	"Basket Case"	2:56
4.	"2000 Light Years Away"	2:38
5.	"Geek Stink Breath"	2:06
6.	"Brain Stew / Jaded"	4:34
7.	"Walking Contradiction"	2:35
8.	"Stuck with Me"	2:18
9.	"Hitchin' a Ride"	2:50
10.	"Nice Guys Finish Last"	2:57
11.	"Prosthetic Head"	3:33
12.	"Redundant"	3:16
13.	"Castaway"	3:50
14.	"Church on Sunday"	3:13
15.	"Minority"	3:18
16.	"Waiting"	3:20
Total length:		48:27

== Charts ==
Chart performance for BBC Sessions
Chart (2021–2022)	Peak position
Australian Albums (ARIA)	121
German Albums (Offizielle Top 100)	79
Hungarian Albums (MAHASZ)	19
Scottish Albums (Official Charts)	27
UK Albums (Official Charts)	44
UK Rock & Metal Albums (Official Charts)	1
US Top Album Sales (Billboard)	35
US Top Alternative Albums (Billboard)	18
US Top Rock Albums (Billboard)	33
