= Foot in Mouth =

Foot in Mouth may refer to:

- Foot-and-mouth disease
- Foot in Mouth Award, an award by the British Plain English Campaign for "a baffling comment by a public figure"
- Foot in Mouth (Goldfinger album), 2001
- Foot in Mouth (EP), 1997 EP by Green Day
