= Bowling Bowling Bowling Parking Parking =

EP by Green Day
- Released: July 25, 1996
- Recorded: March 10, 1994, January 27, 1996, March 26, 1996
- Venues: Jannus Landing, St. Petersburg, Florida, Harumi Arena, Tokyo, Sporthalle, Prague
- Genre: Punk rock
- Length: 18:05
- Labels: WEA; Reprise
- Producer: Green Day

Green Day chronology
Insomniac (1995)	Bowling Bowling Bowling Parking Parking (1996)	Nimrod (1997)

Bowling Bowling Bowling Parking Parking is the second live EP by the American rock band Green Day, released in July 1996. It was released across Eurasia, parts of South America, and Australia, and to date has not seen a release in North America. It was recorded during the tour of Insomniac in 1996 in Tokyo and Prague, with the exception of "Knowledge", which was recorded during the Dookie tour.

== Commercial performance ==
Bowling Bowling Bowling Parking Parking peaked at number 42 on the Japanese album chart.

== Track listing ==
Tracks originate from the Slappy EP, Kerplunk!, Dookie, and Insomniac. All tracks are written by Green Day with the exception of "Knowledge", written by Jesse Michaels.

Bowling Bowling Bowling Parking Parking track listing
No.	Title	Length
1.	"Armatage Shanks"	2:18
2.	"Brain Stew"	3:04
3.	"Jaded"	1:23
4.	"Knowledge"	2:37
5.	"Basket Case"	2:52
6.	"She"	2:20
7.	"Walking Contradiction"	2:31
8.	"Dominated Love Slave" (Japanese bonus track)	2:20
Total length:		18:05

=== Notes ===
- Tracks 1, 2, 3 and 7 were recorded in Prague on March 26, 1996.
- Track 4 was recorded at Jannus Landing, St. Petersburg, Florida on March 11, 1994.
- Tracks 5, 6 and 8 were recorded in Tokyo on January 27, 1996.

== Personnel ==
Band

- Billie Joe Armstrong – lead vocals, guitar
- Mike Dirnt – bass guitar, backing vocals
- Tré Cool – drums

Production

- Rob Cavallo – producer, mixing on track 4
- Steve Holroyd – mixing on tracks 1–3, 5–7
- Jerry Finn – mixing on track 8
- Green Day – producer
- Cheryl Jenets – artist coordinator
- Lori Burton – project coordinator

== Charts ==
Chart performance for Bowling Bowling Bowling Parking Parking
Chart (1996)	Peak position
Japanese Albums (Oricon)	42
