= Insomniac (Green Day album) =

Studio album by Green Day
- Released: October 10, 1995
- Recorded: December 1994 – May 1995
- Studios: Hyde Street, San Francisco, California
- Genre: Punk rock
- Length: 32:49
- Label: Reprise
- Producers: Rob Cavallo; Green Day

Green Day chronology
Dookie (1994)	Insomniac (1995)	Bowling Bowling Bowling Parking Parking (1996)

Green Day studio chronology
Dookie (1994)	Insomniac (1995)	Nimrod (1997)

Singles from Insomniac
- 1. "Geek Stink Breath" Released: September 25, 1995; 2. "Stuck with Me" Released: December 21, 1995; 3. "Brain Stew" / "Jaded" Released: April 10, 1996

Insomniac is the fourth studio album by the American rock band Green Day, released on October 10, 1995, by Reprise Records. It was recorded at Hyde Street in San Francisco, and the band prioritized high-energy takes during the recording sessions. Released as the follow-up to the band's multi-platinum breakthrough Dookie, Insomniac featured a heavier sound, with bleaker lyrics than its predecessor. Lyrically, the album discusses themes such as alienation, anxiety, boredom, and drug use.

The album received generally positive reviews from critics, who praised the singer Billie Joe Armstrong's songwriting and sarcastic sense of humor. Four songs were released as singles, "Geek Stink Breath", "Stuck with Me", "Brain Stew" / "Jaded" and "Walking Contradiction". Though it peaked at number 2 on the Billboard 200 chart and was certified 2× Platinum by the Recording Industry Association of America in 1996, Insomniac did not have the sales endurance of its predecessor Dookie, largely due to its slightly darker lyrical tone and its heavier and more abrasive sound. Insomniac has sold over 2.1 million copies in the United States as of 2012. The album was reissued on vinyl on May 12, 2009. In 2021, a deluxe version of the album was released for its 25th anniversary, including previously unreleased live tracks.

== Background ==
"The fact that that album came out, like, a year and a half after Dookie was us trying to cut off the bullshit in its tracks and just keep making music. That’s all we wanted to do, keep making music. Sometimes I feel that Insomniac is the most honest record I ever made at the particular moment that it was written and recorded."

— Billie Joe Armstrong on Insomniac

Green Day's previous album Dookie (1994), their first for a major label, was approaching the ten-million sales mark by the time of recording Insomniac, and the band's success saw them rejected by the punk circles in which the group got their start. The group also began performing at large venues such as coliseums and hockey arenas. The singer and guitarist Billie Joe Armstrong was stung by criticisms of being a "sell out", telling an interviewer: "I think I was just lost. I couldn't find the strength to convince myself that what I was doing was a good thing. I was in a band that was huge because it was supposed to be huge, because our songs were that good. But I couldn't even feel that I was doing the right thing, because it felt like I was making so many people angry."

The band's state of discombobulation inspired them to prove themselves with Insomniac. The bassist Mike Dirnt later said: "I felt at the time that there was a real urgency to what we were doing. There was a real urgency to stake our claim and say, 'No, we belong here.' It was really important to us to make sure people knew that we weren’t just a flash in the pan." During this period the band members also underwent changes in their personal lives; Armstrong married and had a son, while the drummer Tré Cool and his wife had a daughter. For Armstrong, reaching all these milestones was a surreal experience and he struggled to process these sudden changes, noting that "what I really wanted to do was keep working, and keep writing songs...I didn't really stop and smell the roses".

== Recording ==
Much of the album was written and rehearsed in a small, Cape Cod-style home in East Oakland, California. The band decorated the walls with notes underneath song titles jokingly providing instructions for achieving the intended tempo for each track; these included "Must pop Valium for this one" and "Must take crank for this one". After the birth of Cool and his wife's first child, Cool noted that "I can hit the drums harder than I ever thought I could. Having a kid is trying – you have to watch your temper all the time – but it enhances the experience of playing in the band."

Eschewing the typical punk rock ethos of creating cheap, low-quality recordings, the band strove to perfect its sound on the record, drawing inspiration from bands such as the Beatles and Cheap Trick. Cool experimented with different cymbal sounds on nearly every song on the album, while Armstrong and producer Rob Cavallo developed the ritual of lining up several guitar amps and testing each one to achieve the desired sound. Much of Insomniac was recorded in short, high-energy bursts. Before takes, the group would drink excessive amounts of coffee, "squeeze every last drop of energy" into the recordings, and then rest immediately afterward. Bob Bradshaw of Custom Audio Electronics was employed to apply a thicker guitar sound to the songs.

== Composition ==
=== Musical style ===
"Geek Stink Breath"
"Geek Stink Breath" is the lead single from the album.

"Brain Stew/Jaded"
"Brain Stew/Jaded" is the third single from the album.

David Browne of Entertainment Weekly described Insomniac as "14 slices of hearty anarchy, played with a follow-the-bouncing-spitball compactness and vigor." Ian Winwood of Kerrang! wrote of the album's "master class in buzzsaw efficiency, the songs are so economical, not to mention harsh, that the removal of even a single chord would cause each composition to collapse in on itself," calling it "the album on which its creators lost their baby teeth." Music journalist Andrew Earles said producer Rob Cavallo "helped the band make huge guitar walls out of riffs and grow away from the shiny-happy locker-room dip-shittery of Dookie."

The album features bleaker, more pessimistic lyrics than those of Dookie. However, Rolling Stone noted that the lyrics exemplify "cold-eyed realism, not trendy nihilism or bleak despair." Armstrong's vocal delivery on the album has been described as an "adenoidal vocal whine."

While most consider Insonmiac to be a punk rock album, Loudwire also stated that the album represented scene music.

=== Lyrical themes ===
The album begins with "Armatage Shanks", which explores disassociation and the lack of identity, with Armstrong feeling "Stranded / Lost inside myself." "When I wrote that song it was right before Dookie came out, and I was really at odds with myself," Armstrong said of it in an interview with Spin. "Brat" takes the perspective of a "snot-nosed slob without a job" waiting for his parents to die in order to receive his inheritance. "Stuck with Me", the second single of the album, talks about the band's negative experiences with their newfound fame after releasing Dookie, as evidenced by the line ”I'm not part of your elite, I'm just alright". "Geek Stink Breath", the first single, discusses methamphetamine use, including side effects such as the formation of facial scabs and an accelerated pulse. "No Pride" talks about a narrator at the bottom of society, who doesn't mind being there, since he has no pride. The angst-ridden "Bab's Uvula Who?" begins with the lyric, "I've got a knack for fucking everything up," backed by a "brutal, unforgiving wall of sound." It is followed by "86", which discusses the rejection Green Day faced from the 924 Gilman Street music club in Berkeley after the band's rise to fame in 1994.

"Panic Song" exhibits a pessimistic view of the world, describing it as "a sick machine breeding a mass of shit." It begins with a "pummeling" instrumental introduction that has been compared to the Who, which lasts for roughly the first two minutes of the three-and-a-half minute-long song. It was inspired by Armstrong's panic attacks caused by his anxiety issues and Dirnt's panic attacks, which were suffered as a result of being born with an enlarged mitral valve in his heart. Cool tore the calluses on his hand while recording the instrumental intro, and slumped against a wall between takes. Cavallo recalled the musician's hands resembled "a bloody mess". "Stuart and The Ave." is about a girl Billie liked but then realized he didn't anymore. Billie wrote this song after his girlfriend broke up with him before Insomniac's release. So he proceeded to go home and write a punk anger-filled song about it. Stuart and the Ave. is a real location in Berkeley CA; it is an intersection between Stuart Street and Telegraph Avenue. "Brain Stew", the third and biggest single off of Insomniac, talks about insomnia and is quickly followed by "Jaded". "Westbound Sign" is about Billie's wife, Adrienne, moving to California with him. "Tight Wad Hill" talks about how the activities teens once did (like getting high) are not fun anymore. Tight Wad Hill is also a real place at California Memorial Stadium where people would watch games without paying, as said in the line, "Cheapskate on the hill, a thrill seeker making deals". The final track, "Walking Contradiction" was described as an anthem for "anyone who has chafed against the bounds of the demographically correct, computer-coded, image-conscious mid-'90s."

== Title and artwork ==
God Told Me to Skin You Alive

Before the name Insomniac was decided on, the band considered naming the album Jesus Christ Supermarket and Tight Wad Hill. Insomniac was originally the working title song for "Brain Stew" on demo. After visiting collage artist Winston Smith for the album cover, Billie Joe Armstrong asked him how he managed to make such intricate pieces in such short times. Smith answered: "It's easy for me. I am an insomniac." Armstrong himself has said that the album title comes from his own insomnia, after having been woken up frequently during the night due to his son's screams. Armstrong also mentions his insomnia from the perspective of methamphetamine use in the song "Brain Stew".

The collage on the album cover was created by Smith and is called God Told Me to Skin You Alive, a reference to the Dead Kennedys song "I Kill Children". The cover art contains an image (the dentist) that was originally used in a collage featured in the inside cover art of Dead Kennedys' album Plastic Surgery Disasters (1982). Smith knew drummer Tré Cool from Green Day's time at Lookout! Records and told Cool that if he ever needed album artwork that he should call him. The cover art features several hidden images: a naked woman, three fairies, and several other ghostly faces in the flames. There are also three skulls on the entire album cover and back, one for each member of Green Day. One of the skulls requires the viewer to tilt the piece at an angle. The hidden skull is taken from Hans Holbein's 1533 painting The Ambassadors. Green Day's version, however, is slightly different from the original, with the woman holding Armstrong's iconic Sonic Blue Fernandes imitation Stratocaster rather than an acoustic guitar. In the back cover, the setting is inside a 1950s house. Through a window, you could see the house is on fire, but the people inside are unalarmed with some of them engage in activities such as a man hugging a tarsier, a boy feeding a monkey while a WW-II era soldier (originally from 1944 Pennsylvania Railroad magazine advertisement illustration "On their Way") hands an M1A1 Thompson submachine gun to him, a housewife serving cream, and an unbothered woman doing her makeup.

== Promotion and tours ==
Promotion for Insomniac was limited, with a "virtual press blackout". All of the album's singles contained the words "fuck" or "shit" and the music video for "Geek Stink Breath", showing a methamphetamine addict having his tooth removed, was removed from MTV playlists. This, combined with the God Told Me to Skin You Alive cover collage, led Winwood to comment that "everything about Insomniac was noticeably different from Dookie, yet fully informed by the vast shadow it cast." Larry Livermore, co-founder of the band's former label Lookout Records, found Insomniac to be "depressing", and recalls that he "was even a bit worried about them" upon hearing the single "Brain Stew". A staff writer for People compared the release of Insomniac to Nirvana's In Utero (1993), which featured a darker, less accessible sound in the wake of the success of the band's multi-platinum album Nevermind.

Green Day also became homesick because touring forced the members to leave behind their families. The band eventually decided to cancel the late 1996 European leg of the Insomniac tour to take time off to spend at home. During this time, the band continued to write, and eventually completed over three dozen new songs by the beginning of 1997 for the upcoming album, Nimrod. Although the group's last effort with producer Rob Cavallo was considered a disappointment, the band did not contemplate choosing anyone else to work with on Nimrod, because the members viewed Cavallo as a "mentor".

== Release and commercial performance ==
Insomniac debuted at No. 2 on the Billboard 200, selling over 171,000 copies its first week of release. The first single released from Insomniac was "Geek Stink Breath". The song was successful on both Top 40 and rock radio stations and peaked at number 27 on the Billboard Hot 100 Airplay. The second single, released exclusively in the United Kingdom, was "Stuck with Me". The song was moderately successful in the UK, Australia, and New Zealand, but was not one of the group's bigger hits in the US. The third single from the album was "Brain Stew/Jaded". The two were separate songs (tracks 10 and 11 on Insomniac), but they were released together as a single and a music video. The song "Walking Contradiction" was released as a promotional single in August to promote the album, while "86" was only released as a promotional single in Spain and Germany.

=== Deluxe edition ===
In 2021, For the 25th anniversary, Green Day made a deluxe version of the album, which includes eight tracks from "Live in Prague".

== Critical reception ==
Professional ratings
Review scores
Source	Rating
AllMusic	4/5 stars
Alternative Press	4/5 stars
Entertainment Weekly	B
The Guardian	2/5 stars
Houston Chronicle	3/5 stars
Knoxville News Sentinel	3.5/5 stars
Los Angeles Times	3/4 stars
Rolling Stone	3.5/5 stars
The Rolling Stone Album Guide	4/5 stars
Spin	8/10
The Village Voice	A−

Insomniac did not have the big sales or airplay as the singles from Dookie, but it was generally well received by critics. It earned three and a half out of five stars from Rolling Stone, which said "In punk the good stuff actually unfolds and gains meaning as you listen without sacrificing any of its electric, haywire immediacy. And Green Day are as good as this stuff gets". Entertainment Weekly gave the album a B with particular praise for Billie Joe Armstrong, stating that: "Fans needn't worry about Armstrong, a new father, rhapsodizing over the joys of changing diapers or whining about being a wealthy rock star. Once more, the songs relate the travails of a pathetic, self-loathing goofball whose sense of self-worth is continually reduced to rubble by sundry jerks, authority figures, and cultural elitists."

Green Day was slightly criticized for not progressing as much as their predecessors. Entertainment Weekly stated: "Insomniac does make you wonder about Green Day's growth, though. Between albums one and four, The Clash, to take an old-school example, branched out from guitar crunch to reggae, dub, and Spectorized pop. By comparison, Green Day sound exactly the same as on their first album, albeit with crisper production and, ominously, a palpable degeneration in their sense of humor. The few hints of growth are fairly microscopic: a tougher metallic edge to a few of the songs ... and lyrics that are bleaker than Dookie's."

AllMusic similarly noted that "they kept their blueprint and made it a shade darker. Throughout Insomniac, there are vague references to the band's startling multi-platinum breakthrough, but the album is hardly a stark confessional on the level of Nirvana's In Utero. ... While nothing on the album is as immediate as "Basket Case" or "Longview," the band has gained a powerful sonic punch, which goes straight for the gut but sacrifices the raw edge they so desperately want to keep and makes the record slightly tame. Billie Joe hasn't lost much of his talent for simple, tuneful hooks, but after a series of songs that all sound pretty much the same, it becomes clear that he needs to push himself a little bit more if Green Day ever want to be something more than a good punk-pop band. As it is, they remain a good punk-pop band, and Insomniac is a good punk-pop record, but nothing more." Robert Christgau opined, "[Armstrong's] songs conceptualize his natural whine with a musicality that undercuts his defeatism."

The album was included at number 8 on Rock Sound's "The 51 Most Essential Pop Punk Albums of All Time" list.

== Legacy ==
Despite being considered a commercial disappointment, Armstrong noted, "Insomniac did a lot better than I thought it was going to do...From the sound of it, we knew it wasn't going to sell as much as Dookie." The group embarked on an extensive world tour to promote Insomniac in early 1996, which saw the band performing in sports arenas that contrasted with the small clubs the group was accustomed to playing. The members became increasingly uncomfortable with the level of stardom they had attained; Armstrong recalled, "We were becoming the things we hated, playing those big arenas. It was beginning to be not fun anymore."

Music journalist Andrew Earles referred to the album's third single "Brain Stew" as "one of the better mainstream radio moments" of the decade.

== Track listing ==
All lyrics are written by Billie Joe Armstrong, except where noted; all music is composed by Green Day, except where noted.

No.	Title	Length
1.	"Armatage Shanks"	2:17
2.	"Brat"	1:43
3.	"Stuck with Me"	2:16
4.	"Geek Stink Breath"	2:15
5.	"No Pride"	2:19
6.	"Bab's Uvula Who?"	2:08
7.	"86"	2:47
8.	"Panic Song" (lyrics written by Mike Dirnt and Armstrong)	3:35
9.	"Stuart and the Ave."	2:03
10.	"Brain Stew"	3:13
11.	"Jaded"	1:30
12.	"Westbound Sign"	2:12
13.	"Tight Wad Hill"	2:01
14.	"Walking Contradiction"	2:31
Total length:		32:49

Japanese version
No.	Title	Length
15.	"I Want to Be on T.V." (written by Sam McBride and Tom Flynn; originally performed by Fang)	1:17
Total length:		34:06

Australian tour Souvenir Edition live EP: Recorded Live at Jannus Landing in St. Petersburg, Florida; March 11, 1994 (also known as the Live Tracks EP)
No.	Title	Length
1.	"Welcome to Paradise" (live)	4:06
2.	"One of My Lies" (live)	2:25
3.	"Chump" (live)	2:39
4.	"Longview" (live)	3:30
5.	"Burnout" (live)	2:03
6.	"2000 Light Years Away" (live)	2:49
Total length:		17:11

25th Anniversary Edition Bonus Vinyl: Live from Prague, March 26, 1996
No.	Title	Length
1.	"Armatage Shanks"	2:27
2.	"Brat"	1:55
3.	"Geek Stink Breath"	2:07
4.	"Stuck with Me"	2:12
5.	"Brain Stew"	2:56
6.	"Jaded"	1:32
7.	"Walking Contradiction"	2:27
8.	"86"	4:26
Total length:		20:36

== Personnel ==
Green Day

- Billie Joe Armstrong – vocals, guitar
- Mike Dirnt – bass guitar, vocals
- Tré Cool – drums

Production

- Rob Cavallo; Green Day – producers
- Kevin Army – engineer
- Jerry Finn – mixing
- Richard Huredia; Bernd Burgdorf – second engineers
- Bob Ludwig – mastering

Artwork

- Winston Smith – cover art
- Dirk Walter – art direction
- David Harlan – typographic design

== Charts ==
=== Weekly charts ===
Chart (1995)	Peak position
Australian Albums (ARIA)	5
Austrian Albums (Ö3 Austria)	2
Belgian Albums (Ultratop Flanders)	17
Belgian Albums (Ultratop Wallonia)	12
Canada Albums (The Record)	2
Dutch Albums (Album Top 100)	22
Europe (European Top 100 Albums)	5
Finnish Albums (Suomen virallinen lista)	1
German Albums (Offizielle Top 100)	12
Italian Albums (FIMI)	14
New Zealand Albums (RMNZ)	5
Norwegian Albums (VG-lista)	27
Portuguese Albums (AFP)	5
Scottish Albums (Official Charts)	12
Spanish Albums (AFYVE)	14
Swedish Albums (Sverigetopplistan)	5
Swiss Albums (Schweizer Hitparade)	8
UK Albums (Official Charts)	8
US Billboard 200	2

Chart (2021)	Peak position
Hungarian Albums (MAHASZ)	6

=== Year-end charts ===
Chart (1995)	Position
Canada Top Albums/CDs (RPM)	53
European Top 100 Albums (Music & Media)	57
US Billboard 200	146

Chart (1996)	Position
US Billboard 200	48

== Certifications and sales ==
Region	Certification	Certified units/sales
Argentina (CAPIF)	Gold	30,000^{^}
Australia (ARIA)	Platinum	70,000^{^}
Austria (IFPI Austria)	Gold	25,000^{*}
Brazil (Pro-Música Brasil)	Gold	100,000^{*}
Canada (Music Canada)	2× Platinum	200,000^{^}
Finland (Musiikkituottajat)	Gold	21,350
Germany (BVMI)	Gold	250,000^{^}
Japan (RIAJ)	Platinum	200,000^{^}
Mexico	—	20,000
New Zealand (RMNZ)	Platinum	15,000^{‡}
Spain (Promusicae)	Gold	50,000^{^}
United Kingdom (BPI)	Platinum	300,000^{^}
United States (RIAA)	2× Platinum	2,000,000^{^}
^{*} Sales figures based on certification alone.^{^} Shipments figures based on certification alone.^{‡} Sales+streaming figures based on certification alone.

== In popular culture ==
- The song "Westbound Sign" was used in the teaser trailer for the 2006 Disney/Pixar film Cars.
- The title "Bab's Uvula Who?" comes from a 1976 Saturday Night Live sketch with Gilda Radner and Chevy Chase.
- "86" was featured in the 1996 MTV film Joe's Apartment.
- The songs "Geek Stink Breath", "Brain Stew", and "Jaded" are featured in the music game Green Day: Rock Band.
- A remix of the song "Brain Stew" was made for the soundtrack of the 1998 movie, Godzilla.
