= Stuck with Me =

1995 single by Green Day

Single by Green Day

from the album Insomniac
- Released: December 21, 1995
- Studio: Hyde Street (San Francisco, California)
- Genre: Punk rock
- Length: 2:15
- Label: Reprise
- Composer: Green Day
- Lyricist: Billie Joe Armstrong
- Producers: Rob Cavallo; Green Day

Green Day singles chronology
"Geek Stink Breath" (1995)	"Stuck with Me" (1995)	"Brain Stew" / "Jaded" (1996)

Music video
- "Stuck With Me" on YouTube

"Stuck with Me" is a song by American rock band Green Day. It was released as the second single and third track from their fourth album, Insomniac. The song also appears on the live album Foot in Mouth. It peaked at number 26 on the UK Singles Chart.

== Music video ==
The music video depicts the band performing the song in black-and-white, intercut with animated sequences depicting art by Winston Smith that was created for Insomniac.

== Track listings ==
All lyrics are written by Billie Joe Armstrong; except where noted; all music is composed by Green Day.

UK CD 1
No.	Title	Length
1.	"Stuck With Me"	2:16
2.	"When I Come Around (Live at Johanneshovs Isstadion, Stockholm, Sweden, September 4, 1995)"	2:54
3.	"Jaded (Live at Johanneshovs Isstadion, Stockholm, Sweden, September 4, 1995)"	1:52

UK CD 2
No.	Title	Lyrics	Length
1.	"Stuck With Me (Live at Johanneshovs Isstadion, Stockholm, Sweden, September 4, 1995)"		2:36
2.	"Dominated Love Slave (Live at Johanneshovs Isstadion, Stockholm, Sweden, September 4, 1995)"	Tré Cool	2:10
3.	"Chump (Live at Johanneshovs Isstadion, Stockholm, Sweden, September 4, 1995)"		2:42

== Charts ==
Weekly chart performance for "Stuck with Me"
Chart (1995)	Peak position
Australia (ARIA)	46
Europe (Eurochart Hot 100)	75
New Zealand (Recorded Music NZ)	40
Scottish Singles Sales (Official Charts)	26
UK Singles (Official Charts)	26

== Release history ==
Release dates and formats for "Stuck with Me"
Region	Date	Format(s)	Label(s)	Ref.
Japan	December 21, 1995	CD	Reprise	
United Kingdom	December 27, 1995	CD; cassette	Reprise	
