= Gibson Les Paul bass =

Electric bass guitar

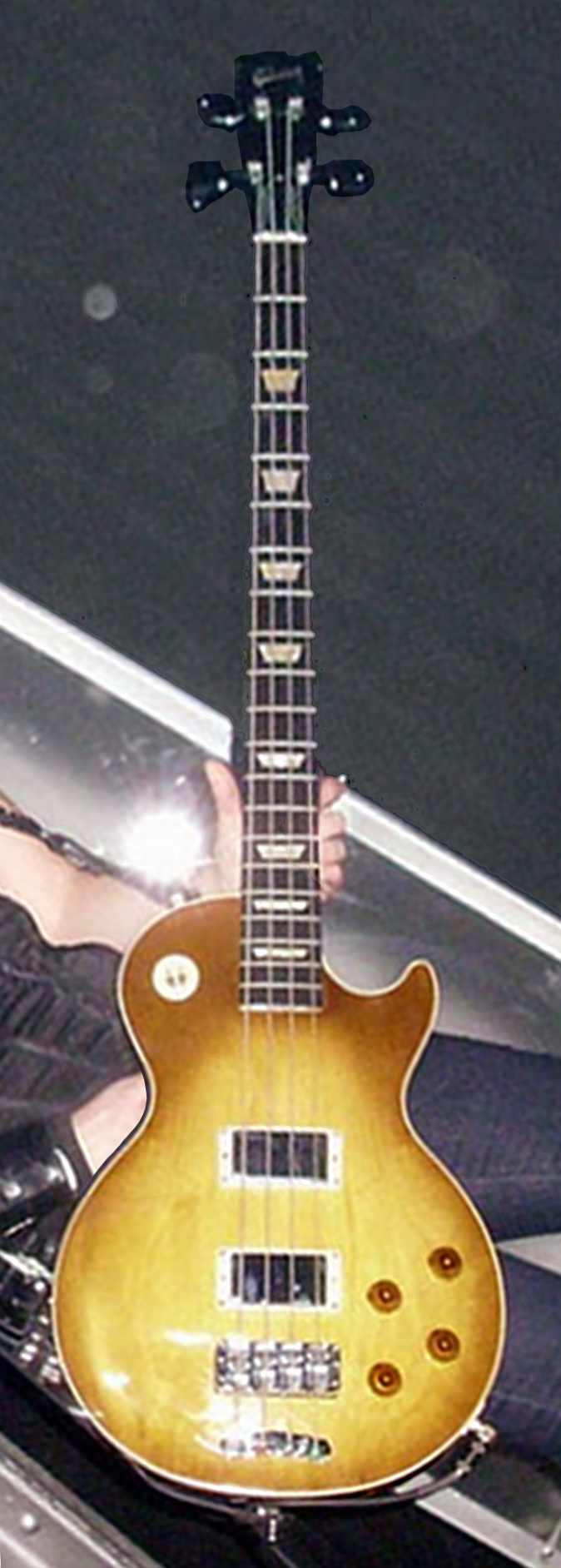
Gibson Les Paul Standard Bass

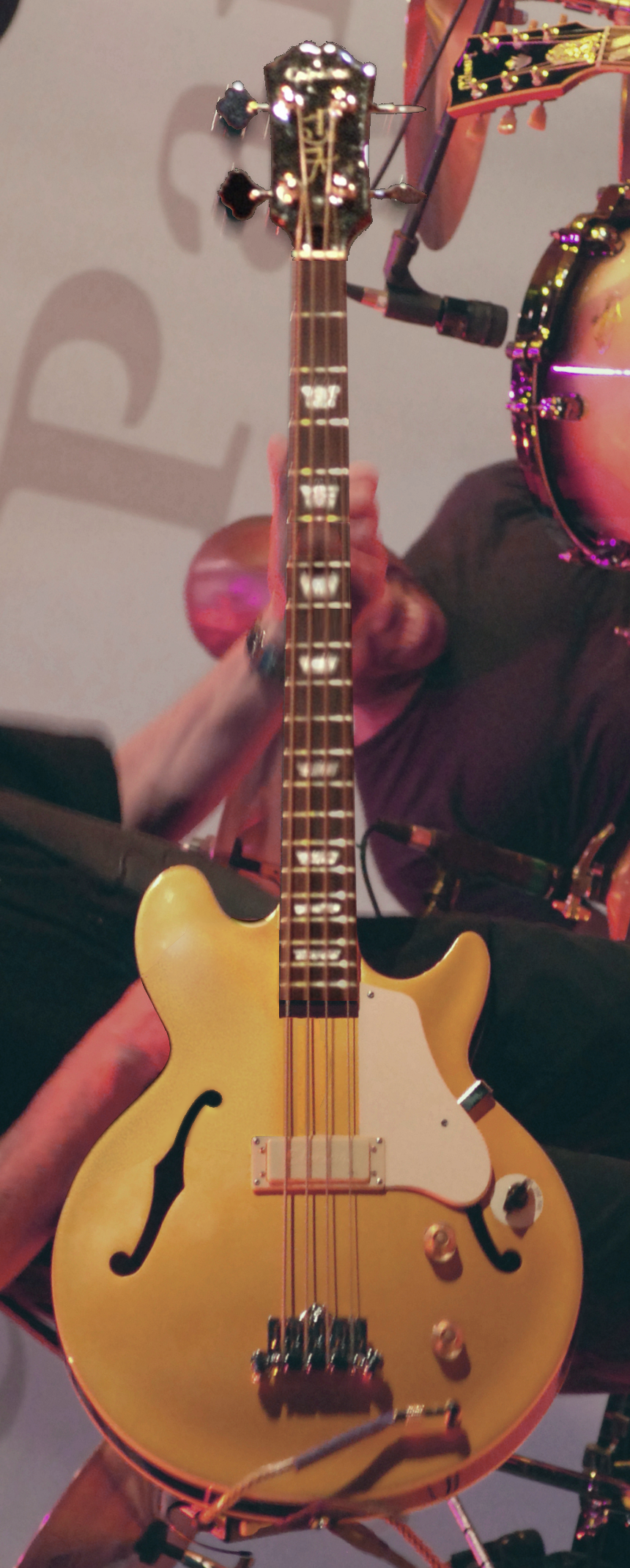
Epiphone Jack Casady Bass (based on Gibson Les Paul Signature Bass (hollowbody))

The Gibson Les Paul bass is a bass guitar first manufactured by Gibson in 1969, just after the relaunch of the Les Paul guitar in 1968.

== History ==
The first model simply called "Les Paul Bass", had a few interesting features, most notably low impedance circuitry, especially designed for recording in the studio. It had a Honduras mahogany body with a three-piece mahogany set neck with 24 frets, and a 30 1/2" scale. Besides volume and tone control it had two humbuckers. This original model turned out to be a flop.

In 1971 the model was redesigned and renamed the Les Paul Triumph. This model had oval low-impedance pickups, volume and tone knobs and a 3-way toggle switch to select between neck, bridge and both pickups, it had slider switches to change the pickups from low to high impedance, switch them in and out of phase, and set the basic tonal voice; physically, however, it was much the same, using the same woods (other than an all-mahogany body, as opposed to the original's maple-capped one) and construction.

A hollow body version was created in 1973, named the Les Paul Signature bass. This was a long scale bass (34½") with double cutaways. It was very different from the preceding models, but still bore the Les Paul name.

In 1979 all Les Paul Bass models were discontinued.

In the early 1990s Gibson concentrated on their classic designs, and decided to give the Les Paul bass another chance. Offerings included flattop versions (Deluxe and Special) and a carved-top Standard model. Les Paul basses were available as 4 or 5-string models. The first 1990s version of the Standard model featured Bartolini electronics and pickups. This version is easily recognized by its lack of a pickup selector switch.

The Les Paul Standard bass, available from 1997 until 2006, featured a carved maple top over a chambered body for reduced weight. It was equipped with the very high output TB Plus humbucking pickups with ceramic magnets on a three-way pickup selector switch and switchable to passive electronics.

In 2011, the Gibson Les Paul Bass Oversized was released. The difference from the Les Paul Standard Bass is that it has a larger body and stoptail with a Tune-o-matic bridge.

At NAMM 2019 Gibson introduced a Les Paul Junior double-cut single pickup bass with a 30.5” scale and three-point bridge as fitted to the company’s SG bass. It appeared in four ‘worn’ nitrocellulose solid body colours with a maple neck and rosewood fingerboard and large black three-ply pickguard. It also features lightweight tuning keys. Its mahogany slab body closely resembles that of the 1959-1961 double cut EB-0 from which the new bass supposedly draws its inspiration but it is not a ‘reissue’ instrument. Unlike its ancestor the new bass has its ceramic twin- coil pickup mid-way between the neck and bridge which can be used in humbucker or single-coil mode via a push/pull volume knob.

== See also ==
- Gibson EB-0/Gibson EB-3 (predecessor)
- Gibson EB-2 (precursor of Signature Bass)
- Gibson Les Paul Standard (design origin of Standard Bass)
