= Winston Smith (artist) =

American artist (born 1952)

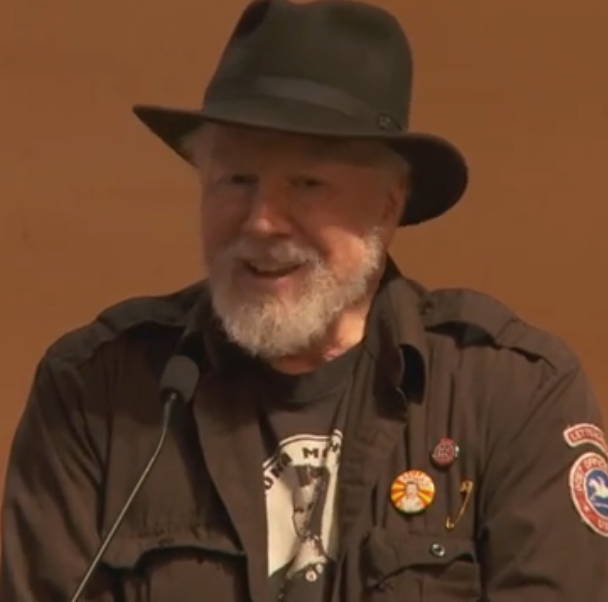
- In a discussion at the San Francisco Public Library in 2016
- Born: May 27, 1952 (age 73); Oklahoma City, Oklahoma, US
- Education: Accademia di Belle Arti di Firenze
- Occupation: Artist

Winston Smith (born May 27, 1952) is an American illustrator who primarily uses the medium of collage. He is probably best known for the artwork he has produced for the American punk rock group Dead Kennedys. He also designed the Motéma Music logo.

Smith is particularly known for his collaborations with Jello Biafra (former Dead Kennedys frontman) and Alternative Tentacles, for whom he has done numerous covers, inserts, advertisements, flyers, and logos. He is responsible for the famous Alternative Tentacles logo as well as the well-known Dead Kennedys logo and six of their record covers. One of his compositions, God Told Me to Skin You Alive, was used as the cover of Green Day's album Insomniac.

A version of an illustration which had been on the back cover of the Biafra/D.O.A. album Last Scream of the Missing Neighbors was later featured on the cover of the April/May 2000 issue of The New Yorker magazine. His work has also appeared in Spin, Playboy, Wired, Utne Reader, Mother Jones, Metro Silicon Valley, Ugly Planet, National Lampoon, and numerous punk fanzines, such as Maximumrocknroll, Seconds, Punk Planet, etc.

His name is a reference to the character of the same name in George Orwell's novel Nineteen Eighty-Four. Smith left the U.S. in 1969 to study art in Italy and, struck by the profound social changes that had occurred during his absence from the U.S., adopted the name after returning to America in 1976.

In Italy, Smith attended the Accademia di Belle Arti di Firenze in Florence studying classical Renaissance art and later won a scholarship to study Cinema at the International University of Art (Florence & Rome). For a few years he traveled throughout Italy, roadie-ing for well-known Italian jazz band Perigeo. Over the last 30 years, Winston has had numerous one-man shows in San Francisco, Los Angeles, New York City, London, Antwerp, Berlin and Rome.

His work has been included in numerous books chronicling the punk rock era as well as having his work included in art text books plus several book covers, such as Greg Palast's best-sellers "The Best Democracy Money Can Buy" and "Armed Madhouse". In addition, Winston has designed over 50 record covers including covers and insert art for Jello Biafra, Burning Brides, George Carlin and Ben Harper.

== Early life ==
Smith was born and grew up in Oklahoma City, Oklahoma. He briefly attended (two months) Oklahoma Christian College and Central State University. After spending nearly seven years in Florence, Italy, Smith moved to Boston and then hitchhiked to San Francisco, where he worked as a roadie for numerous San Francisco bands such as Journey, CSN&Y, The Tubes, Santana and others in the 1970s. While in Italy, he studied at the Academy of Fine Arts in Florence and the International University of Art in Rome.

== Career ==
Smith met fellow artist Jayed Scotti in 1976 and the two collaborated on several projects, producing their self-published magazine Fallout, a satirical pulp-zine, illustrated and written by the duo. They also distributed false posters for non-existent bands and clubs in San Francisco, with the addresses listed on the flyer often located in the Pacific Ocean.

The IDOL or Cross of Money image (later used for the Dead Kennedys first EP album "In God We Trust, Inc.") was created in 1977 in the Fairfax studio of Fallout, as a comment on religious hypocrisy and the worship of money. This was a 3D art piece, fashioned from a real crucifix. Later it was remade as an early color photocopy and submitted to a Berkeley Photocopy show. A friend of Jello Biafra told him of the piece, and later Smith sent him samples of his work. This was the beginnings of the collaboration of Smith and Scotti with the Dead Kennedys. Scotti later became the drummer for The Feederz.

To date, Smith has three published collections of his works: Act Like Nothing's Wrong, Artcrime and All Riot on the Western Front.

Smith is included in the permanent collection of the Scandinavian collage museum.
