= Walking Contradiction =

Promotional single by Green Day

from the album Insomniac
- Released: 1996
- Recorded: 1995
- Studio: Hyde Street Studios, San Francisco, California
- Genre: Punk rock
- Length: 2:31
- Label: Reprise
- Composer: Green Day
- Lyricist: Billie Joe Armstrong
- Producers: Rob Cavallo; Green Day

Music video
- "Walking Contradiction" on YouTube

"Walking Contradiction" is a song by American rock band Green Day, released as a promotional single in 1996 from their fourth album, Insomniac. Also the closing track on the album, the song reached number 21 on the Modern Rock Tracks in August 1996. The riff of this song originally appeared as the guitar solo for a demo version of "Haushinka", recorded but unused on previous album Dookie. "Haushinka" would eventually appear on their follow-up album, Nimrod.

== Music video ==
Directed by Roman Coppola and mostly filmed in San Pedro, Los Angeles, California, the video features the trio going about in a town casually causing accidents, explosions, and mayhem, unaware of their actions. At the end of the video, they all meet up with each other, get into a car and drive off, just as a building collapses. The music video received a Grammy nomination for "Best Music Video, Short Form" at the 39th Grammy Awards in 1997.

The video uses a different mix of the song done by Steve Holroyd

== Chart positions ==
| Chart (1996) | Peak position |
|---|---|
| US Mainstream Rock (Billboard) | 25 |
| US Alternative Airplay (Billboard) | 21 |

== Other versions ==
- A live version appears on the 1996 Green Day live EP, Bowling Bowling Bowling Parking Parking.
- Cheekface recorded a cover version for the 2020 charity album Jesus Christ Supermarket: A Compilation to Celebrate 25 Years of Green Day’s Insomniac. The compilation's title references a title that was considered for Insomniac, but not used.
