= Geek Stink Breath =

1995 single by Green Day

Single by Green Day

from the album Insomniac
- B-side: "I Want to Be on TV"; "Don't Wanna Fall in Love"
- Written: 1994
- Released: September 25, 1995
- Studio: Hyde Street (San Francisco, California)
- Genre: Punk rock
- Length: 2:15
- Label: Reprise
- Composer: Green Day
- Lyricist: Billie Joe Armstrong
- Producers: Rob Cavallo; Green Day

Green Day singles chronology
"J.A.R." (1995)	"Geek Stink Breath" (1995)	"Stuck with Me" (1995)

Music video
- "Geek Stink Breath" on YouTube

"Geek Stink Breath" is a song by American rock band Green Day. It was released on September 25, 1995, by Reprise Records as the lead single and fourth track from their fourth studio album, Insomniac (1995). The song, along with "Stuck with Me", appeared on the live EP Foot in Mouth that was only released in Japan. Its music video was directed by Mark Kohr. The lyrics expound the effects of methamphetamine on the human body; the word "geek" is slang for methamphetamine.

== Composition ==
Written in 1994, "Geek Stink Breath" was played along with "Stuart and the Ave." during a soundcheck at Chicago in November 1994 (the video can be found on the video game Green Day: Rock Band) and the song debuted live on December 3, 1994, during Green Day's first performance on Saturday Night Live. The word "shit" in the line "wish in one hand and shit in the other and see which one gets filled first" was left uncensored since the show's production team could not understand the lyrics to the new song (closed caption typed it as "unintelligible lyrics") and were not aware that the band had sworn on TV. The song was later recorded and released on the band's fourth studio album, Insomniac, and as the album's lead-off single.

A live version of the song recorded on the band's 21st Century Breakdown World Tour in Saitama-Shi, Japan was included on the band's 2011 live album Awesome as Fuck and its accompanying bonus DVD.

== Critical reception ==
Pan-European magazine Music & Media wrote, "Who says they're fakes? Sounding "less British", US new punk gets its own identity on the first single off Insomniac, the successor to Dookie. It's got a hell of a smell!"

== Music video ==
The accompanying music video for "Geek Stink Breath" was directed by Mark Kohr. It includes distorted, low-resolution footage of the band playing the song in a basement, intercut with graphic footage of one of the band's friends having a tooth pulled by a dentist, which was intended to only be shown during late-night hours on MTV. The footage of the tooth extraction symbolizes the effect that methamphetamine can have on one's teeth, hence the line "and it's rotting out my teeth". An edited version of the music video is shown internationally.

== Track listings ==
All lyrics are written by Billie Joe Armstrong; except where noted.

CD
No.	Title	Lyrics	Length
1.	"Geek Stink Breath"		2:15
2.	"I Want to Be on TV" (Fang Cover)	Sam McBride, Tom Flynn	1:17
3.	"Don't Wanna Fall in Love"		1:40

== Charts ==
=== Weekly charts ===
Weekly chart performance for "Geek Stink Breath"
Chart (1995)	Peak position
Australia (ARIA)	40
Canada Top Singles (RPM)	22
Canada Rock/Alternative (RPM)	1
Europe (Eurochart Hot 100)	36
Finland (Suomen virallinen lista)	5
Germany (GfK)	73
Ireland (IRMA)	27
Netherlands (Dutch Top 40 Tipparade)	16
Netherlands (Single Top 100)	14
New Zealand (Recorded Music NZ)	11
Scottish Singles Sales (Official Charts)	21
Sweden (Sverigetopplistan)	28
UK Singles (Official Charts)	16
US Radio Songs (Billboard)	27
US Alternative Airplay (Billboard)	3
US Mainstream Rock (Billboard)	9

=== Year-end charts ===
Year-end chart performance for "Geek Stink Breath"
Chart (1995)	Position
US Modern Rock Tracks (Billboard)	39

== Release history ==
Release dates and formats for "Geek Stink Breath"
Region	Date	Format(s)	Label(s)	Ref.
United Kingdom	September 25, 1995	7-inch vinyl; CD; cassette	Reprise	
Australia	October 23, 1995	CD; cassette	Reprise	
Japan	October 25, 1995	CD	Reprise	
