= Brain Stew / Jaded =

1996 single by Green Day

"Brain Stew" / "Jaded"

Single by Green Day

from the album Insomniac
- B-side: "Do Da Da"; "Good Riddance"
- Released: April 10, 1996
- Studio: Hyde Street (San Francisco, California)
- Genre: Punk rock; hardcore punk; alternative rock; grunge
- Length: 3:13 ("Brain Stew"); 1:30 ("Jaded"); 4:43 (both parts)
- Label: Reprise
- Composer: Green Day
- Lyricist: Billie Joe Armstrong
- Producers: Rob Cavallo; Green Day

Green Day singles chronology
"Stuck with Me" (1995)	"Brain Stew" / "Jaded" (1996)	"Hitchin' a Ride" (1997)

Music video
- "Brain Stew" / "Jaded" on YouTube

"Brain Stew" and "Jaded" are two songs by American rock band Green Day, released as a joint single. The songs are transitional—"Brain Stew" segues directly into "Jaded". They appear as the 10th and 11th tracks on the group's fourth studio album, Insomniac, and were released as the album's third and final single in April 1996. One of the B-sides has an early version of the song "Good Riddance (Time of Your Life)", with the song having a more sarcastic tone than the Nimrod release. There is also a limited-edition CD single of the two songs in which the disc is in the shape of a brain.

Upon its release, "Brain Stew" / "Jaded" peaked at number three on the US Billboard Modern Rock Tracks chart, number one on the Canadian RPM Alternative 30, and number 28 on the UK Singles Chart. Both songs were included on the band's first greatest hits album, International Superhits!. However, only "Brain Stew" was included on the band's second greatest hits album, God's Favorite Band, and is the only song off of Insomniac to be included. After the September 11 attacks, "Brain Stew" was placed on Clear Channel's list of post-9/11 inappropriate titles.

== Background ==
"Brain Stew" is about vocalist/guitarist Billie Joe Armstrong dealing with insomnia. According to Armstrong, "Brain Stew" was originally called "Insomniac" on demo (hence the title of the album on which it is featured), and "Brain Stew" is a reference to Armstrong's long-time friend, James Washburn, who is nicknamed Brain Stew.

== Music video ==
The music video for "Brain Stew / Jaded" consists of two parts: The "Brain Stew" portion of the video is sepia toned and depicts the band lying on a couch being pulled through a landfill by a bulldozer, interspersed with shots of hula dancers, mealworms, a dog, and a teacher writing on a chalkboard. When the song transitions to "Jaded", the video transitions to chrome and shows fast shots of the band playing the song in their recording studio with more shots of mealworms and hula dancers. The video was directed by Kevin Kerslake.

== Live performances ==
"Brain Stew" has been played at most Green Day concerts since its release and is one of the band’s most-played songs live. There have been several notable performances of this song. For instance, the band played the song in front of 130,000 people at the Milton Keynes National Bowl for the live DVD–CD Bullet in a Bible. Another notable performance was when the group performed it at Goat Island in Sydney, Australia, on October 19, 2000, where Armstrong mixed up the verses by accident. During the 21st Century Breakdown World Tour, the band played this after playing numerous rock cover songs.

== Track listing ==
All lyrics are written by Billie Joe Armstrong; all music is composed by Green Day.

CD
No.	Title	Length
1.	"Brain Stew" / "Jaded"	4:43
2.	"Do Da Da"	1:30
3.	"Good Riddance" (Early Version)	2:03
4.	"Brain Stew" (clean radio edit; faded ending)	3:13

== Other versions ==
"Brain Stew"

- A live version featured on Bowling Bowling Bowling Parking Parking recorded March 26, 1996, at Sporthalle, Prague, Czech Republic. Later featured on the vinyl box set version of the "Brain Stew" / "Jaded" single.
- Another live version on Bullet in a Bible.
- A remix was made for the soundtrack of the 1998 movie Godzilla.
- Rivers Cuomo did a cover of the song on Sessions @AOL in 2009. The performance was recorded for his band Weezer's EP called Happy Record Store Day.
- A cover was made by the band the Upside Downs named "Brain Stew 10". The band was made by Ray William Johnson.
- A cover was made by musician K.Flay in 2020.

"Jaded"

- A live version found on Bowling Bowling Bowling Parking Parking recorded March 26, 1996, at Sporthalle, Prague, Czech Republic.
- A live version was performed during the Milton Keynes concert recorded for Bullet in a Bible but was omitted from the CD/DVD.

"Good Riddance (Time of Your Life)"

- This single features a demo version of the Nimrod track "Good Riddance (Time of Your Life)". This demo is played in G♭ rather than G standard.

== Charts ==
=== Weekly charts ===
Weekly chart performance for "Brain Stew" / "Jaded"
Chart (1996–97)	Peak position
Australia (ARIA)	88
Canada Top Singles (RPM)	35
Canada Rock/Alternative (RPM)	1
Scottish Singles Sales (Official Charts)	32
UK Singles (Official Charts)	28
UK Rock & Metal (Official Charts)	2
US Radio Songs (Billboard)	35
US Alternative Airplay (Billboard)	3
US Mainstream Rock (Billboard)	8

=== Year-end charts ===
Year-end chart performance for "Brain Stew" / "Jaded"
Chart (1996)	Position
Canada Rock/Alternative (RPM)	11
US Mainstream Rock Tracks (Billboard)	19
US Modern Rock Tracks (Billboard)	13

== Certifications ==
Certifications and sales for "Brain Stew" / "Jaded"
Region	Certification	Certified units/sales
New Zealand (RMNZ)	Gold	15,000^{‡}
United Kingdom (BPI)	Silver	200,000^{‡}
^{‡} Sales+streaming figures based on certification alone.

== Release history ==
Release dates and formats for "Brain Stew" / "Jaded"
Region	Date	Format(s)	Label(s)	Ref.
United States	January 16, 1996	Contemporary hit radio	Reprise	
Japan	April 10, 1996	CD	Reprise	
United Kingdom	June 24, 1996	CD; cassette	Reprise	

== See also ==
- List of RPM Rock/Alternative number-one singles (Canada)
