= Dookie =

Studio album by Green Day
- Released: February 1, 1994
- Recorded: September–October 1993
- Studios: Fantasy (Berkeley, California); Music Grinder (Hollywood, California)
- Genres: Punk rock; pop-punk; skate punk
- Length: 39:35
- Label: Reprise
- Producers: Rob Cavallo; Green Day

Green Day chronology
Kerplunk (1991)	Dookie (1994)	Insomniac (1995)

Singles from Dookie
- 1. "Longview" Released: February 1, 1994; 2. "Basket Case" Released: August 1, 1994; 3. "Welcome to Paradise" Released: October 17, 1994; 4. "When I Come Around" Released: January 16, 1995

Dookie is the third studio album by the American rock band Green Day, released on February 1, 1994, by Reprise Records. The band's first collaboration with producer Rob Cavallo, it was recorded in 1993 at Fantasy Studios in Berkeley, California and Music Grinder Studio in Hollywood, California. Written mostly by the singer and guitarist Billie Joe Armstrong, the album is largely based on his personal experiences and includes themes such as boredom, anxiety, relationships, and sexuality. It was promoted with four singles: "Longview", "Basket Case", a re-recorded version of "Welcome to Paradise" (which originally appeared on the band's second studio album, 1991's Kerplunk), and "When I Come Around".

After several years of grunge's dominance in popular music, Dookie brought a livelier, more melodic rock sound to the mainstream and propelled Green Day to worldwide fame. Considered one of the defining albums of the 1990s and of punk rock in general, it was also pivotal in solidifying the genre's mainstream popularity. Its influence continued into the new millennium and beyond, being cited as an inspiration by many punk rock and pop-punk bands, as well as artists from other genres.

Dookie received critical acclaim upon its release, although some early fans accused the band of being sellouts for leaving its independent label (Lookout! Records) and embracing a more polished sound. The record won a Grammy Award for Best Alternative Album at the 37th Annual Grammy Awards in 1995. It was a worldwide success, topping the album charts in Australia, Canada, and New Zealand while reaching the top five in Austria, Finland, Germany, Portugal, Sweden, and the United States.

Dookie was later certified double diamond (20 times platinum) by the Recording Industry Association of America (RIAA) as well as diamond by Music Canada. This has sold over 20 million copies worldwide, becoming the band's best-selling album and one of the best-selling albums of all time. It has been labeled by critics and journalists as one of the greatest albums of the 1990s and one of the greatest punk rock and pop-punk albums of all time. Rolling Stone placed Dookie on all four iterations of its "The 500 Greatest Albums of All Time" list, and at number 1 on its "The 50 Greatest Pop-Punk Albums" list in 2017. In 2024, the album was selected for preservation in the United States National Recording Registry by the Library of Congress as being "culturally, historically, or aesthetically significant".

== Background ==
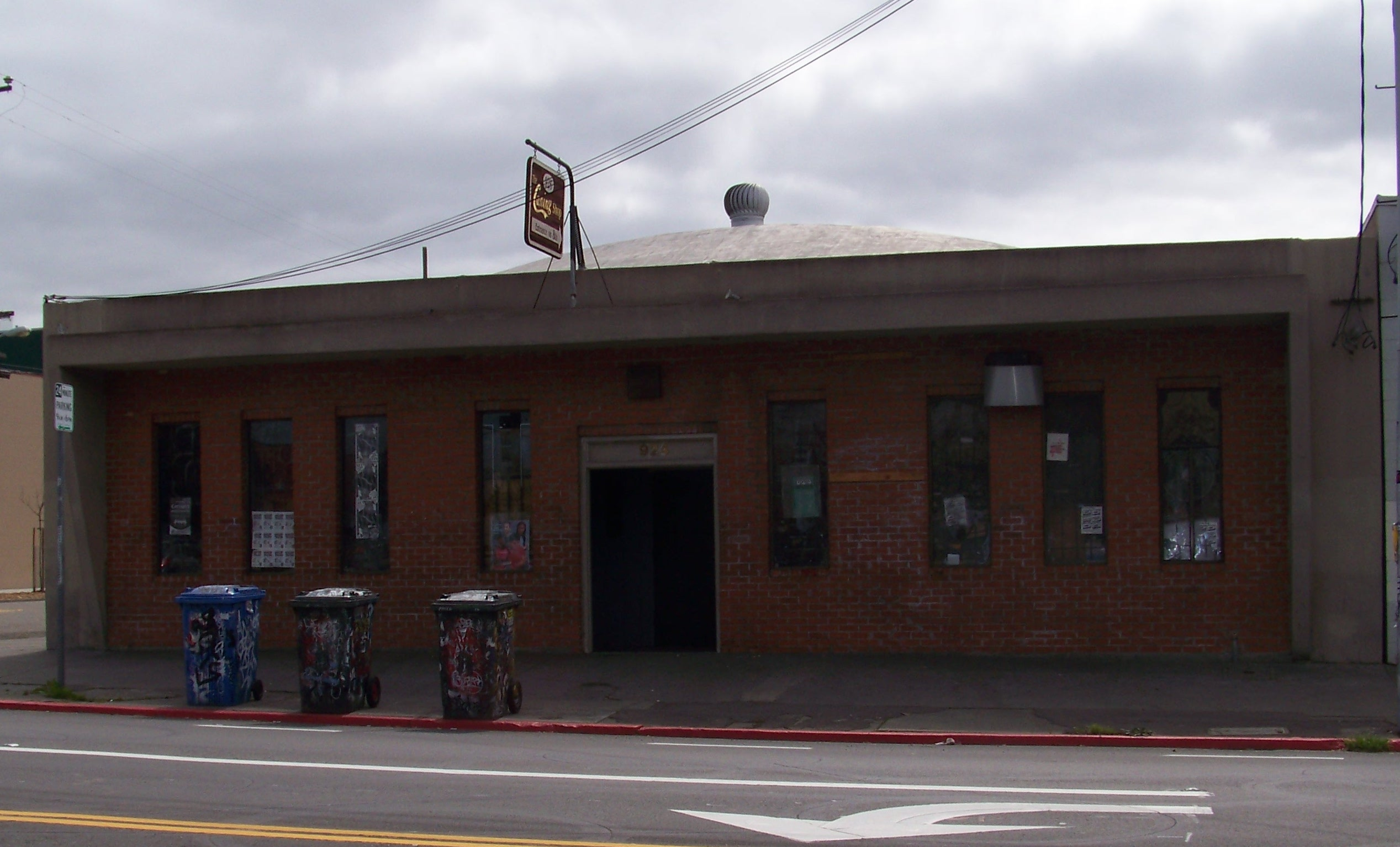
The exterior of 924 Gilman Street in West Berkeley. Green Day played the venue until they were banned in September 1993 for signing with a major label.

With the success in the independent world of the band's first two albums, 39/Smooth (1990) and Kerplunk (1991), which sold 30,000 units each, a number of major record labels became interested in Green Day. Among them were Sony, Warner Bros., Geffen and Interscope. Representatives of these labels attempted to entice the band to sign by inviting them for meals to discuss a deal, with one manager even inviting the group to Disneyland. The band declined these advances; Armstrong believed that the labels were more than likely looking for something that resembled a grunge band, namely "second- and third-rate Nirvanas and Soundgardens", and they did not want to conform to a label's vision. That changed when they met the producer and A&R representative Rob Cavallo of Reprise, a subsidiary of Warner Bros. The band played Beatles covers for him for 40 minutes, then Cavallo picked up his own guitar and jammed with them. They were impressed by his work with fellow Californian band the Muffs, and later remarked that Cavallo "was the only person we could really talk to and connect with".

Eventually, the band left their independent record label, Lookout! Records, on friendly terms. They signed a five-album deal with Reprise in April 1993. The deal secured Cavallo as the producer of the first record and allowed the band to retain the rights to its albums on Lookout!. Signing to a major label caused many of Green Day's original fans to label them sell-outs, including the influential punk fanzine Maximumrocknroll and the independent music club 924 Gilman Street. After Green Day's September 3 gig at 924 Gilman Street, the venue banned the group from entering or playing.They did however show up and played anyway despite the ban in 2001. They returned to the venue in 2015, when they played a benefit concert there and their ban was lifted. Reflecting on this period in 1999, Green Day frontman Billie Joe Armstrong told Spin magazine: "I couldn't go back to the punk scene, whether we were the biggest success in the world or the biggest failure [...] The only thing I could do was get on my bike and go forward."

== Recording and production ==
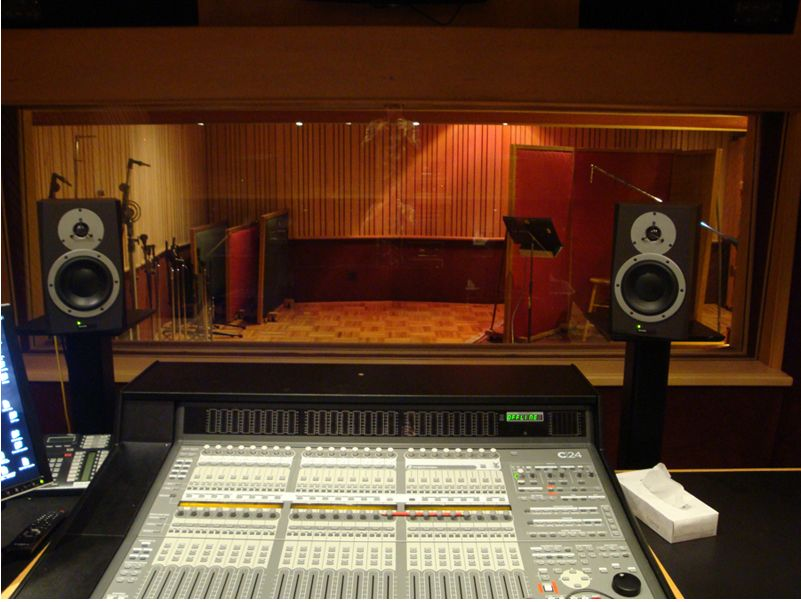
Fantasy Studios in Berkeley, California, where most of Dookie was recorded

Following the band's last Gilman Street performance, Green Day demoed the songs "She", "Sassafras Roots", "Pulling Teeth" and "F.O.D." on Armstrong's four-track tape recorder and sent it to Cavallo. After listening to it, Cavallo sensed that "[he] had stumbled on something big." However, he recognized that the band members were struggling to play their best; he reasoned that they were anxious because the most time they had previously spent recording an album was three days while recording Kerplunk. To lighten the mood, he invited them to a Mexican restaurant and bar down the street from Fantasy Studios, even though the drummer Tré Cool was not of legal drinking age at the time. Armstrong confirmed the band's anxiety in an interview years later, describing the group feeling "like little kids in a candy store" and fearing that the band would lose money on work being scrapped by the label for not meeting standards. Despite this, they focused on making the most of the new production resources at their disposal; unlike their previous albums where the band had to rush to complete them to save money, the band took their time to perfect the quality of their output. Armstrong noted that he learned "how to dial in good sounds, get the best guitar tones. I was able to take a little time doing vocals." With a larger budget, Armstrong began exploring different amplifiers in search of a thicker guitar tone. He eventually selected a 100-watt Marshall Plexi 1959SLP amplifier to use on the album, which he nicknamed "Pete". According to Armstrong, "We were just trying to go from loud to louder."

Recording took place over the course of three weeks at Fantasy, and the album was mixed twice by Cavallo and the producer Jerry Finn. Though the band took their time to make a quality product as a whole, Armstrong's vocals were still recorded very quickly; he recorded about 16 or 17 songs in two days, most of them in a single take. Armstrong said the band at first "wanted it to sound really dry, the same way the Sex Pistols record or the early Black Sabbath records sounded", but the band found the result of this approach to be an unsatisfactory original mix. Cavallo agreed, and it was remixed at Devonshire Sound Studios in North Hollywood, Los Angeles. During the remixing process, the band took to Music Grinder Studio in Hollywood to re-record the tracks "Chump" and "Longview" as the original recordings had been "plagued by an inordinate amount of tape hiss". Bassist Mike Dirnt substituted the Fender Precision/Jazz combo bass he had used to record the rest of Dookie for a Gibson Les Paul bass on these recordings, which he described as having a "hollow" sound. Armstrong later said of their studio experience, "Everything was already written, all we had to do was play it." Among the material recorded but not included on the album was "Good Riddance (Time of Your Life)", which would later be re-recorded for the band's 1997 album Nimrod and become a hit in its own right. The band also recorded new versions of the songs "Welcome to Paradise", "2000 Light Years Away" and "Christie Rd." from their second album Kerplunk and "409 in Your Coffeemaker" from their second EP, Slappy, though only "Welcome to Paradise" would make it onto the final album.

== Composition ==
The formula was simple. Take a few power chords, a catchy tune, some tongue-in-cheek humor, and do it all fast so kids will want to jump up and down. This is hardly revolutionary; Green Day's sound and sense of irony was heavily borrowed from The Ramones and the Sex Pistols—lead singer Billie Joe Armstrong even sings with a faint attempt at an English accent. But Green Day differed from the British punk scene, by making punk a bratty ordeal free of revolutionary political pretensions, while retaining the rebellion.

— Jason Chow of the National Post in the book 1001 Albums You Must Hear Before You Die (2005)

Stylistically, the album has been categorized primarily as punk rock, but also as pop-punk and as a "power pop take" on skate punk. Additionally, Loudwire stated that the album represented scene music in 2023.

NME characterized the album's sound by "crashing drums, razor-wire guitars, [and] a double helping of fuck you attitude", and Arielle Gordon of Pitchfork stated that the album "made apathy sound apoplectic". Influences from the Ramones and the Sex Pistols were noted in Armstrong's guitar technique throughout the album; he recorded the album almost entirely with his Fernandes Stratocaster, which he named "Blue", and incorporated frequent major chords and palm muting. Armstrong achieved the album's loud, crunchy guitar sound with a 100-watt Marshall Plexi 1959SLP amplifier. Many of the album's tracks have brief runtimes; Fred Thomas of AllMusic noted, "the way the tracks fly by nervously in barrages of buzzing guitars and half-sung, half-sneered vocals from Billie Joe Armstrong intentionally aims to obscure how precise their arrangements are." Jason Chow of the National Post characterized the tracks themselves as "furious but sweet melodies". Additionally, bassist Mike Dirnt incorporated vocal harmonies that have drawn comparisons to Brill Building music.

Lyrically, the album is characterized by its "irreverent attitude", and touched upon various experiences of the band members and included subjects such as anxiety and panic attacks, masturbation, sexual orientation, boredom, self-deprecation, mass murder, divorce, domestic abuse, and ex-girlfriends. PopMatters summarized the album's theme as "a record that speaks of the frustrations, anxieties, and apathy of young people". Gordon assessed that the album "reached for humor to communicate helplessness", and joked: "For the downtrodden and the downwardly mobile, masturbating until you lose your mind can feel like rebellion, too." Much of Dookie's content was written by Armstrong, except "Emenius Sleepus", which was written by the bassist Mike Dirnt, and the hidden track, "All by Myself", which was written by Tré Cool.

=== Songs 1–7 ===
"Longview"
"Longview", the fourth track on Dookie, was the band's debut single, and its music video was played frequently on MTV in late 1994 as a promotional tool.

Dookie opens with "Burnout", a "speedy, antsy rocker" centered around a central character's feelings of general apathy toward life. The track has been described as a "disarmingly cheerful descent into total numbness". Armstrong wrote the song "Having a Blast" when he was in Cleveland in June 1992. The song revolves around a mentally ill character who plans to use explosives to kill himself and others. This was not regarded as a serious issue at the time, as the social climate could allow the song to be viewed as "mere cathartic fantasy", but later incidents such as the 1999 Columbine High School massacre have made the song the "most uncomfortable track" on the album. On "Chump", Armstrong takes the perspective of someone who shows prejudice, insulting another person without actually knowing them. At the end of the song, it is revealed that the disliked person in question matches Armstrong's description of himself. "Chump" is also the first of three songs that allude to Amanda, a former girlfriend of Armstrong's. The album's first single, "Longview", had a signature bass line that Dirnt wrote while under the influence of LSD. In an interview with Guitar World in 2002, Armstrong described the character in the song as based on himself when he lived in Rodeo, California: "There was nothing to do there, and it was a real boring place." To entertain himself, the character does nothing but watch television, smoke marijuana, and masturbate, and has little motivation to change these habits despite tiring of the same cycle of behaviors.

"Welcome to Paradise", the third single from Dookie, originally appeared on the band's second studio album, Kerplunk!. Described as a "bleakly sardonic portrait of urban decay", the song was written about Armstrong's experiences living in bad neighborhoods around Oakland, California. "Pulling Teeth", one of the album's slower songs, uses dark humor about domestic violence. the male narrator is at the mercy of his female partner. The band's inspiration for this song came from a pillow fight between Dirnt and his girlfriend that ended with the bassist breaking his elbow. The second single, "Basket Case", which appeared on many singles charts worldwide, was also inspired by Armstrong's personal experiences. The song deals with Armstrong's panic attacks and feelings of "going crazy" before being diagnosed with a panic disorder. Using palm muting, Armstrong is the only one who plays on the song until halfway through the song's first chorus, with the other instruments' arrival representing panic setting in. In the second verse, "Basket Case" mentions soliciting a male prostitute; Armstrong said, "I wanted to challenge myself and whoever the listener might be. It's also looking at the world and saying, 'It's not as black and white as you think. This isn't your grandfather's prostitute – or maybe it was.'" The music video was filmed in an abandoned mental institution. It is one of the band's most popular songs.

"Basket Case"
Sample of "Basket Case", the third single from Dookie, which was about Armstrong's panic attacks.

=== Songs 8–14 ===
"She" was written about Amanda, who showed him a feminist poem entitled "She". In return, Armstrong wrote the lyrics of "She" and showed them to her. When Amanda broke up with Armstrong in early 1994 and moved to Ecuador to join the Peace Corps, Armstrong decided to put "She" on the album. Musically, "She" is similar to "Basket Case", although it is slightly faster, and draws inspiration from the Beatles. The song's beginnings mirror those of "Basket Case"; whereas Armstrong was the only one to play as "Basket Case" began, Armstrong's guitar does not enter until later in "She" while his bandmates provide a musical backdrop. The song tells the story of a young woman who feels trapped in an unsatisfactory life. Amanda is also referenced in the next track, "Sassafras Roots". Sonically closer to the band's material on Kerplunk!, it is an unconventional love song that uses irony and sarcasm in an effort to avoid being direct, and centers on a couple wasting time together in a romantic relationship. The tenth track, "When I Come Around", was the album's final single. It was inspired by Adrienne Nesser, Armstrong's girlfriend and eventual wife. Following a dispute between the couple, Armstrong left Nesser to spend some time alone. Described as the closest thing to a ballad on the album, "When I Come Around" is driven by a recognizable two-bar, palm-muted guitar riff of four chords, while Dirnt's bass part stands out by adding additional pulled-off and hammered-on portions to the guitar's accompaniment. The song's lyrics highlight two meanings of its title: the narrator begins by talking to someone they believe they could address the needs of, having literally come around; in the second verse, the singer realizes they aren't what the other person needs, having "come around" figuratively.

The song "Coming Clean" deals with Armstrong's coming to terms with his bisexuality as a teenager. At the time, he was still looking for himself sexually and had no well-defined sexual orientation. In his interview with The Advocate magazine, he said that although he has never had a relationship with a man, his sexuality has been "something that comes up as a struggle in me". "Emenius Sleepus", written by Dirnt, is about two old friends who meet by chance, and the narrator realizes that they have both changed a lot as people. Played in a quick staccato-styled rhythm, Armstrong wrote the song "In the End" about his mother and stepfather, and the reproach Armstrong felt toward his mother for choosing his stepfather as a partner. "F.O.D.", an acronym for "Fuck Off and Die", begins calmly with Armstrong alone on acoustic guitar, before the band suddenly arrives in a louder, full-force fashion. The theme of the song centers around the singer's grudge for another individual, and wishing misfortune upon them. A hidden track, "All By Myself", with vocals and guitar by Cool, plays after "F.O.D." ends, and is about masturbation.

== Title and artwork ==
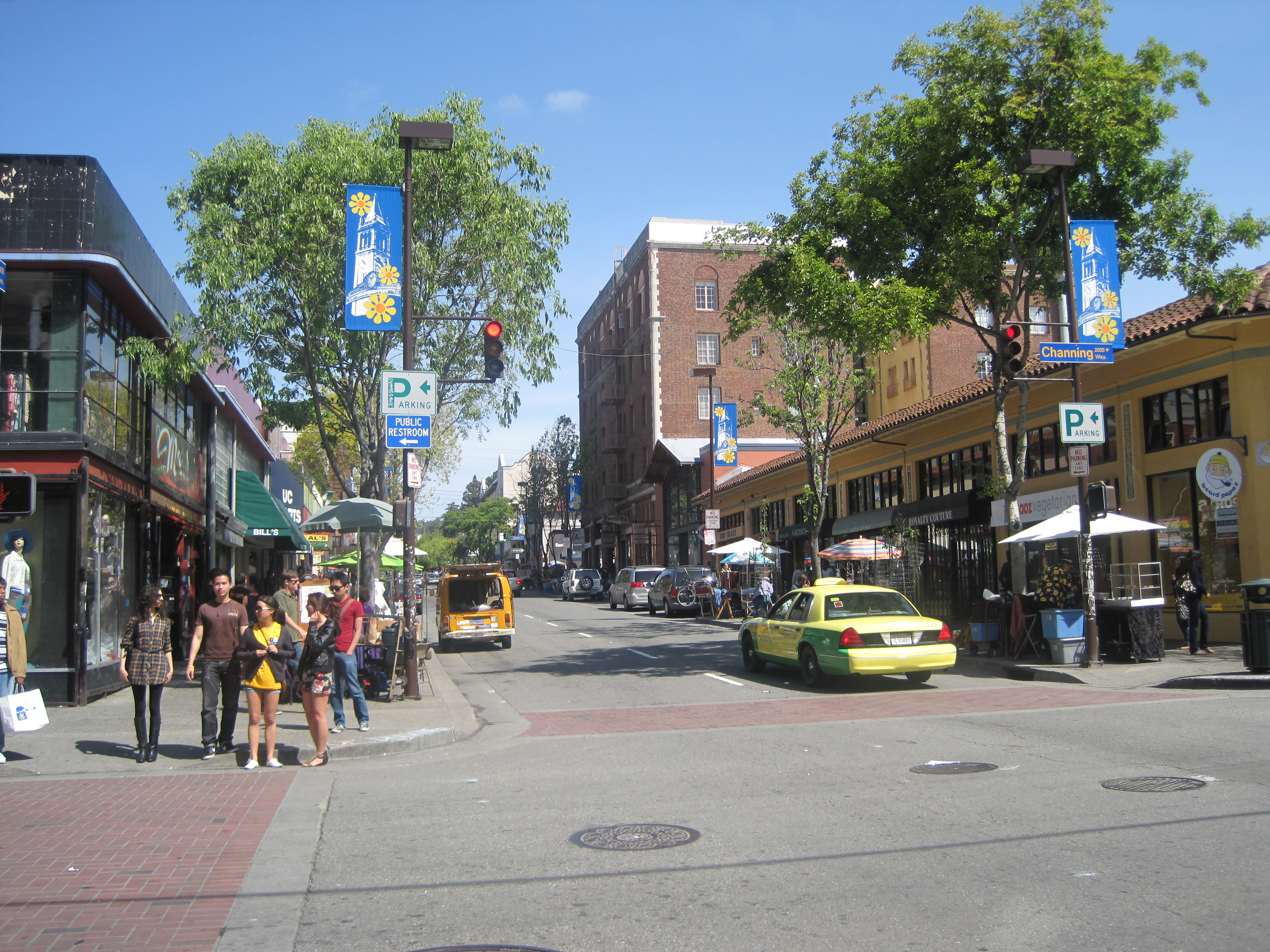
Telegraph Avenue in downtown Berkeley, circa 2010. The street is the setting of the album cover artwork, drawn by East Bay artist Richie Bucher.

Dookie is American slang for feces. It is a reference to the diarrhea—"liquid dookie"—that the band members suffered while eating spoiled food on tour. Initially, the band aimed to name the album Liquid Dookie, but this was shortened to Dookie. Asked in 2014 if the choice was a mistake in hindsight, Armstrong said it had been an impulsive "stoner thing": "We were smoking a lot of weed [and said] 'Hey, man, wouldn't it be funny if...'"

For its cover art, the band commissioned artist Richie Bucher, who created a cartoon-like work depicting bombs being dropped on people and buildings. Bucher says Armstrong only told him the album's title, so he worked around the theme of fecal matter. As a child, Bucher had associated feces with dogs and monkeys, both of which appear prominently on the album's cover.

The setting is a replica of Berkeley's Telegraph Avenue. In the center, there is an explosion with the band's name at the top. The cover depicts Patti Smith showing off her armpit as shown on the cover of her album Easter (1977), a shootout surrounding Black Panther Party co-founder Huey P. Newton, the woman on Black Sabbath's self-titled debut album, Angus Young of AC/DC, and the Sather Tower. Friends of the band members are among the foreground figures on whom dogs and monkeys throw their excrement. A dog pilots the plane that drops bombs with the words Dookie written on them, while the name of the group is written in brown in the center of the explosion. Oil refineries in Rodeo, California, can be seen in the distance.

Armstrong has since explained the meaning of the artwork:

I wanted the art work to look really different. I wanted it to represent the East Bay and where we come from, because there's a lot of artists in the East Bay scene that are just as important as the music. So we talked to Richie Bucher. He did a 7-inch cover for this band called Raooul that I really liked. He's also been playing in bands in the East Bay for years. There's pieces of us buried on the album cover. There's one guy with his camera up in the air taking a picture with a beard. He took pictures of bands every weekend at Gilman's. The robed character that looks like the Mona Lisa is the woman on the cover of the first Black Sabbath album. AC/DC guitarist Angus Young is in there somewhere too. The graffiti reading "Twisted Dog Sisters" refers to these two girls from Berkeley. I think the guy saying "The fritter, fat boy" was a reference to a local cop.

When the trio went to Warner's offices in Los Angeles to discuss marketing for the album, label officials initially wanted the cover to feature a photograph of the comely young men, but the band refused. George Weiss, Warner's marketing director, noted that the band came from a distinctly different culture than most of their artists, and Green Day had gained the leverage with the label to insist on a different choice. The back cover features a yellow, orange, and sepia toned photo of a concert crowd at Roseland Ballroom. It was taken in 1993, when the band was opening for Bad Religion. In the early prints of the CD and vinyl, one of the crowd members is shown holding a plush toy of Ernie from Sesame Street, which was airbrushed out of later prints for fear of litigation; however, Canadian and European prints still feature Ernie on the back cover. Some rumors suggest that it was removed because it led parents to think that Dookie was a child's lullaby album or that the creators of Sesame Street had sued Green Day.

== Release and promotion ==
While rehearsing in the house they rented in Berkeley at the end of 1993 in anticipation of a tour for Dookie, the band was invited to the Warner offices in Los Angeles to discuss the marketing strategy around the album with Weiss. The latter expected to meet three scornful young men with reputations in punk music, when in reality the band members were intimidated to even be invited to the meeting. They discussed the first single, "Longview", as well as projected goals for the album's sales: Cavallo hoped to sell at least 200,000 units, while Cool looked higher toward 500,000. Demand was well underestimated; when Dookie was released on February 1, 1994, the album's first 9,000 produced copies quickly sold out. "Longview" was released as the album's lead single simultaneously with the album. Despite promising demand from the quick depletion of the album's initial supply, it initially resulted in modest total sales as strategies were adjusted to meet demand, and only after the music video for "Longview" debuted on MTV on February 22 did the album begin to attract stronger attention, first entering the Billboard 200 rankings at number 127.

In March, the group made appearances on Late Night with Conan O'Brien, The Jon Stewart Show and 120 Minutes on MTV. Sales for Dookie rose greatly following these performances, peaking at number two on the Billboard 200 in the United States. The record became an international success as well; the album peaked in the top ten of the German, Finnish, Norwegian, Dutch, Italian, Swedish, and Swiss charts, while it topped the Australian, Canadian, and New Zealand charts. By June 14, Dookie was certified gold by the Recording Industry Association of America (RIAA), having sold more than 500,000 copies in the United States. That month, an issue of Time hailed the album as a work creating an impact comparable to Nirvana's Nevermind (1991).

On August 1, "Basket Case" was released as the album's second single. The song's music video quickly became an MTV staple. The following month, "Longview" was nominated in three categories at the 1994 MTV Video Music Awards. Green Day performed the unreleased song "Armatage Shanks" at the ceremony, which would later appear on their following album Insomniac (1995), but did not win any of the categories which they were nominated for. In October, Warner proposed "Welcome to Paradise" to be the third single, noting potential to make good sales. However, Armstrong refused because the song evoked a part of his life and he did not feel capable of promoting it with a music video. The song was ultimately only broadcast on the radio domestically, being met with great success despite not being sold to the public. An exclusive United Kingdom single release for the song did proceed on October 17. Near the end of 1994, Don Pardo invited the band to perform on Saturday Night Live.

Ahead of the 37th Annual Grammy Awards, "When I Come Around" was released to radio as the album's final single in December 1994. The band had been nominated in four Grammy Award categories: Best Alternative Music Album, Best New Artist, Best Rock Performance by a Duo or Group with Vocal with "Basket Case", and Best Hard Rock Performance with "Longview". They won only the former of the categories. In the meantime, "When I Come Around" had been quickly climbing the charts; it held the top of the Billboard Modern Rock Chart for seven weeks and peaked at number six of the Hot 100 Airplay chart, becoming the band's most successful single from the album. Throughout the 1990s, Dookie continued to sell well, eventually receiving diamond certification from the RIAA in 1999, signifying ten million copies sold. By 2014, Dookie had sold over 20 million copies worldwide and remains the band's best-selling album. By 2024, the RIAA had certified it 20× platinum — double diamond — for twenty million copies sold in the United States alone.

== Critical reception ==
Professional ratings
Review scores
Source	Rating
AllMusic	5/5 stars
Alternative Press	5/5 stars
Billboard	4.5/5 stars
Chicago Sun-Times	3.5/4 stars
Chicago Tribune	3.5/4 stars
NME	7/10
Pitchfork	8.7/10
The Rolling Stone Album Guide	5/5 stars
Spin Alternative Record Guide	8/10
The Village Voice	A−

Dookie was released to critical acclaim. In early 1995, Jon Pareles of The New York Times wrote, "Punk turns into pop in fast, funny, catchy, high-powered songs about whining and channel-surfing; apathy has rarely sounded so passionate." Rolling Stone's Paul Evans described Green Day as "convincing mainly because they've got punk's snotty anti-values down cold: blame, self-pity, arrogant self-hatred, humor, narcissism, fun". Jesse Raub, writing for Alternative Press, praised "Burnout" for immediately opening with a "huge, polished production value without abandoning their scrappy, loose punk playing" which consistently shines through the rest of the album's tracks. In a 20th anniversary retrospective review for Billboard, Chris Payne highlighted how Armstrong's "sugary, almost bubblegum choruses" were unique for punk at the time, and forcefully brought mainstream attention to punk rock music.

The Chicago Tribune's Greg Kot was appreciative of the loudness and urgency in the album's sound, detecting influences from the Who and the Zombies. Mark Sutherland of NME showcased the record's "crashing drums" and "razor-wire guitars", concluding, "Being dumb has never been so much fun." A 2017 review from Pitchfork's Marc Hogan summarized the album's material as "buzzing, hook-crammed tracks that acted like they didn't give a shit", but resounded so well with its audience because in truth "on a compositional and emotional level they were actually gravely serious", praising the album's outlandish artwork for helping ease the tense nature of the music. Robert Christgau, writing for The Village Voice, opined that "punk lives, and these guys have the toons and sass to prove it to those who can live without", praising their themes of apathy, insanity, poverty, and "the un-American way".

Neil Strauss of The New York Times, while complimentary of the album's overall quality, followed up Pareles' review by noting that Dookie's pop sound only remotely resembled punk music. The band did not respond initially to these comments, but later claimed that they were "just trying to be themselves" and that "it's our band, we can do whatever we want". Dirnt claimed that the follow-up album, Insomniac, one of the band's most aggressive albums lyrically and musically, was the band releasing their anger at all the criticism and distaste from critics and former fans. On the other hand, Thomas Nassiff at Fuse cited it as the most important pop-punk album.

== Legacy ==
Green Day's Dookie—along with the Offspring's Smash, released two months later—has been credited for helping bring punk rock back into mainstream music culture. NME argues, "Dookie's success proved to record label, film and TV [executives] that the teen rock revolution they had been witnessing for much of the early '90s didn't have to be all gloomy nihilism and angsty sonics. Dookie made rock fun again." Stephen Thomas Erlewine of AllMusic described Dookie as "a stellar piece of modern punk that many tried to emulate but nobody bettered". On the album's twentieth anniversary, The Daily Beast wrote that before its release "rock meant grunge: heavy, monotonic, humorless, and bleak", but the lighter tone of Dookie changed the public's general understanding of the term. It "made the entire pop-punk movement possible...it shaped the way people looked, dressed, danced, and spent their summers. Odeley [sic] is fantastic. So is OK Computer. But neither record triggered the sort of commercial tsunami of compatriots and copycats that followed in Dookie's wake." Berkeley-based Rancid was one of the first bands to capitalize on the hype created by Green Day and the Offspring with ...And Out Come the Wolves, giving the new punk rock movement stability. In 2024, the album was selected for preservation in the United States National Recording Registry by the Library of Congress as being "culturally, historically, or aesthetically significant".

Some critics claim that Dookie allowed numerous similar artists to enjoy long careers, including Rancid, New Found Glory, Fall Out Boy, Panic! At The Disco, Blink-182, Simple Plan, and Yellowcard. Good Charlotte guitarist Billy Martin, Something Corporate frontman Andrew McMahon, and Sum 41 frontman Deryck Whibley all claim stylistic influence from the album. NME believes Blink-182's Enema of the State (1999), Sum 41's All Killer No Filler (2001), My Chemical Romance's The Black Parade (2006), and even Lady Gaga's The Fame (2008) could not have been created without Dookie. Gaga has said that the album was the first she ever purchased. Jason Chow of the National Post assessed: "Punk purists still cringe at this groundbreaking record. But no one can deny that Green Day reinvigorated an old genre for a new generation with Dookie."

In 2014, its twentieth anniversary, the album received several list accolades. In April 2014, Rolling Stone placed the album at No. 1 on its "1994: The 40 Best Records From Mainstream Alternative's Greatest Year" list, ahead of Nine Inch Nails' The Downward Spiral and Weezer's self-titled debut. A month later, Loudwire placed Dookie at No. 1 on its "10 Best Hard Rock Albums of 1994" list. Guitar World ranked Dookie at number thirteen in their list "Superunknown: 50 Iconic Albums That Defined 1994" that July. Rolling Stone cited it as one of the greatest punk rock albums of all time in 2016, and NME ranked it as the 18th-best album of 1994. In 2014, Emily Barker of NME wrote: "they don't make 'em like this any more. Crack open a beer and come on in. Being dumb has never been so much fun." NME also listed "Welcome to Paradise" as a top-50 song for the year.

A 30th-anniversary deluxe edition of the album, released on September 29, 2023, includes outtakes, demos, and two live concert recordings. On October 9, 2024, the band announced Dookie Demastered, a collaboration with the Los Angeles–based art studio BRAIN where each song on the album was ported onto an "obscure, obsolete and otherwise inconvenient" format, such as a wax cylinder and a Teddy Ruxpin; those who won in a drawing would be eligible to purchase each item.

In September 2025, Collider placed Dookie fifth on its list of "10 Pop-Punk Albums That Are Amazing From Start to Finish".

=== Accolades ===
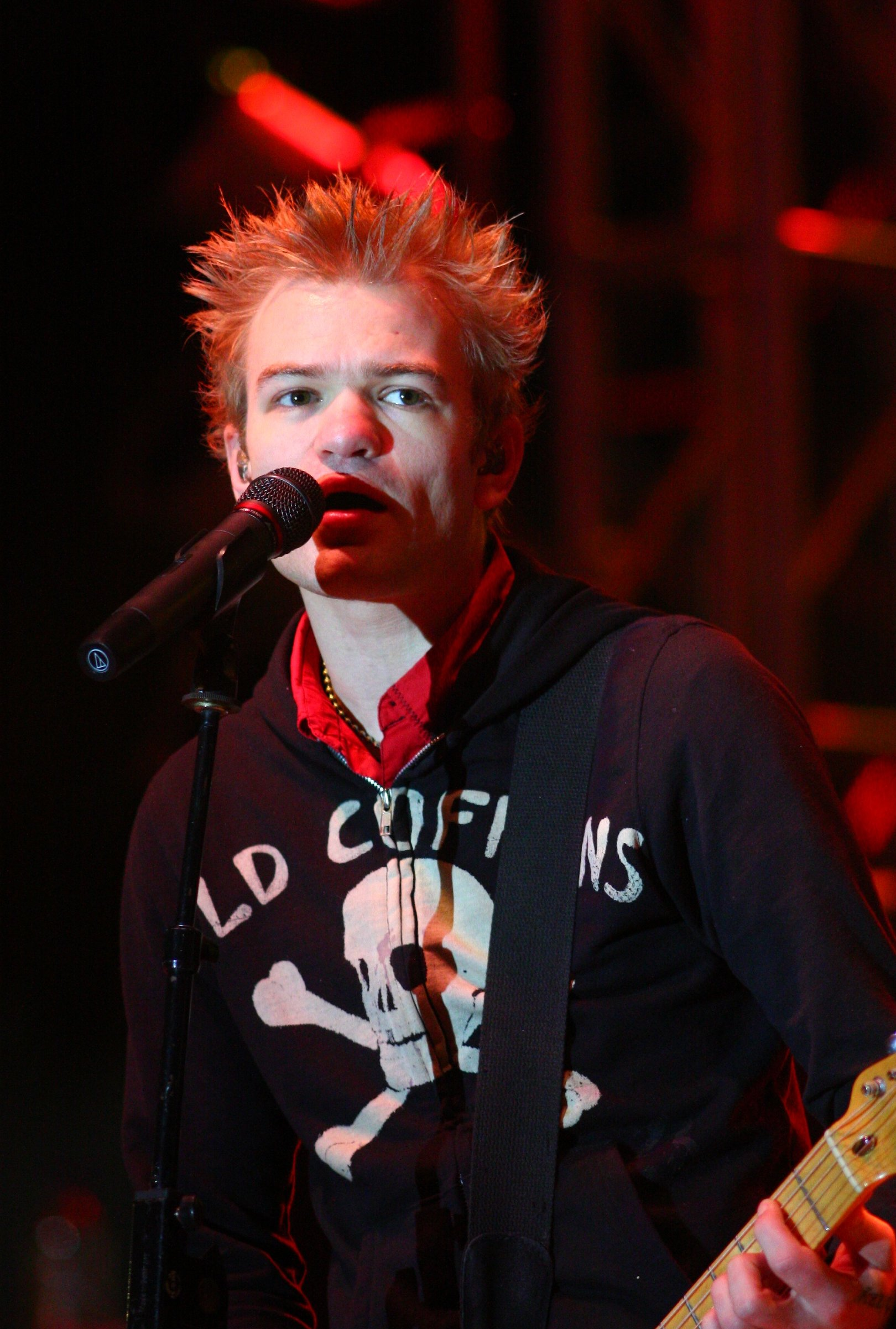
Deryck Whibley and his band Sum 41 are said to have been influenced by Dookie.

Dookie has appeared on many prominent "must have" lists compiled by the music media, including:

Publication	Country	Accolade	Year	Rank
Robert Dimery	United States	1001 Albums You Must Hear Before You Die	2005	—N/a
Rolling Stone	United States	The 500 Greatest Albums of All Time	2020	375
Rolling Stone	United States	Best Albums of 1994 (Readers Choice)	1994	1
Rolling Stone	United States	40 Greatest Punk Albums of All Time	2016	18
Rolling Stone	United States	1994: The 40 Best Records From Mainstream Alternative's Greatest Year	2014	1
Loudwire	United States	10 Best Hard Rock Albums of 1994	1994	1
Rolling Stone	United States	100 Best Albums of the Nineties	2010	30
Spin	United States	100 Greatest Albums, 1985–2005	2005	44
Pitchfork	United States	The 150 Best Albums of the 1990s	2022	111
Rock and Roll Hall of Fame	United States	The Definitive 200	2007	50
Kerrang!	United Kingdom	51 Greatest Pop Punk Albums Ever	2015	2
Revolver	United States	50 Greatest Punk Albums of All Time	2018	13
LouderSound	United Kingdom	The 50 Best Punk Albums of All Time	2018	11
LA Weekly	United States	Top 20 Punk Albums in History: The Complete List	2013	13
Loudwire	United States	The Best Hard Rock Album of Each Year Since 1970	2024	1

== Live performances ==
In mid-1993, while recording and mixing the album, Green Day opened for several Bad Religion concerts, allowing them to play new songs to a live audience. However, unlike their previous shows, the band was now playing before audiences of two to three thousand people. Two weeks after the release of Dookie, the band embarked on an international tour. In the United States, they traveled between shows in a bookmobile belonging to Tré Cool's father. From late April to early June 1994, the band toured Europe, playing around 40 concerts in the United Kingdom, Germany, Denmark, Belgium, the Netherlands, Italy, Spain and Sweden. The band's popularity was still rising slowly when they arrived in Europe; in Belgium, the audience numbered about 200 people. Cavallo recorded a few performances during the tour, to show the three young men their evolution on stage, and for use as B-sides on later releases.

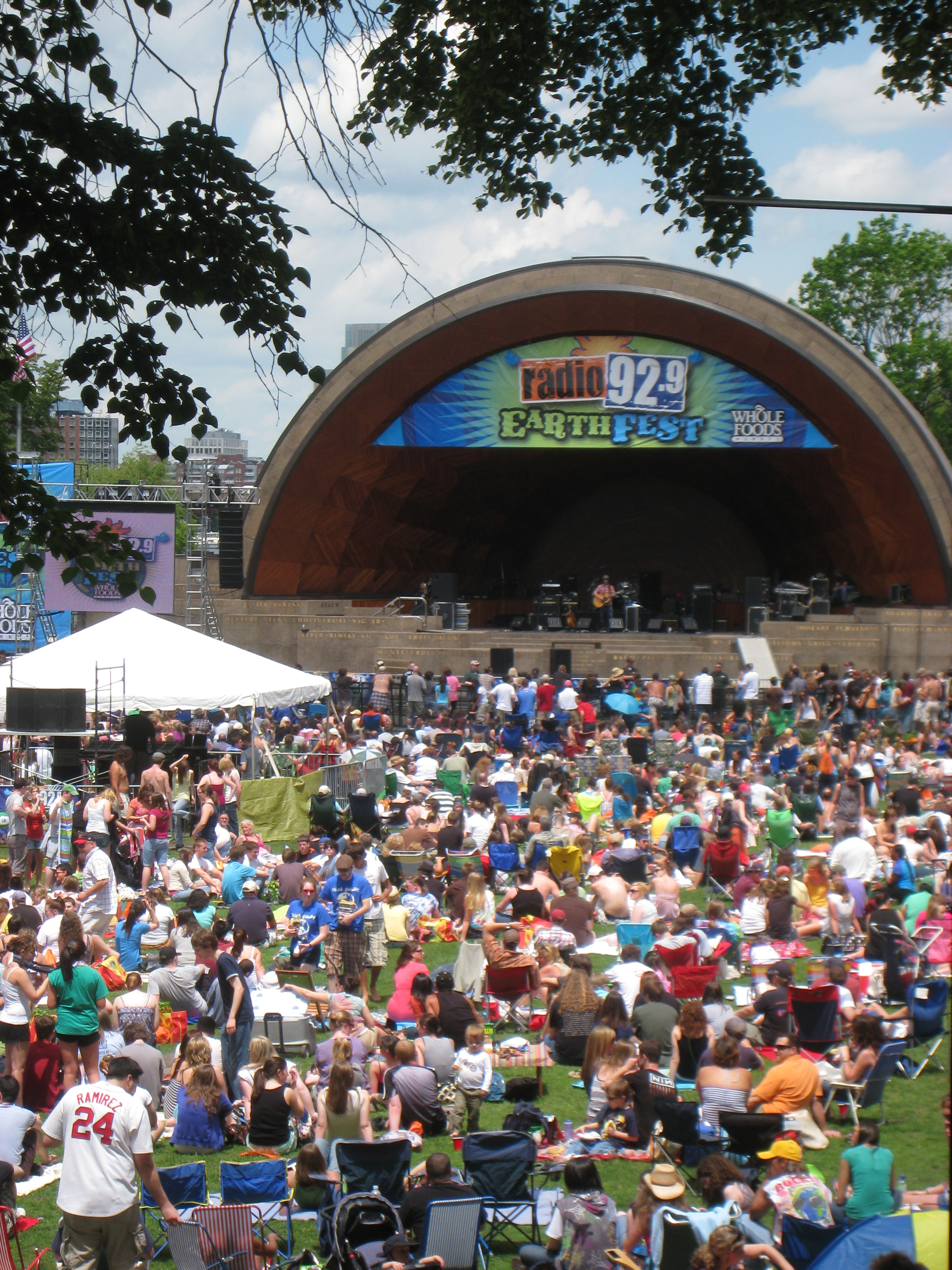
The Hatch Shell in Boston where Green Day played a free concert that resulted in a riot

After the European tour, Armstrong proposed to Nesser after four years of on-and-off relationships. Because the tour prevented them from properly planning their wedding and their honeymoon, the two married in a small ceremony on July 2, 1994, attended only by Green Day's two other members and their girlfriends. Adrienne discovered she was pregnant the next day, and Armstrong was upset about being unable to help and care for her. The trio then joined the second leg of Lollapalooza as the main attraction, and program directors set them to play the opening of the main stage. They missed a date of the traveling festival to perform on August 14 at Woodstock '94. This event, the 25th anniversary of the original 1969 festival in Saugerties, New York, saw a mud "fight" between the band and the crowd. Although organizers hoped that Green Day would be a big draw, their punk rock style stuck out at the event and the band's performance was poorly received by the crowd. When they opened their set with "Welcome to Paradise" after three days of rain, the audience was provoked by the irony and threw mud at them. Armstrong responded by taunting the crowd, and the event escalated into a mud fight among the audience and the band. During the fight, Dirnt was mistaken for a fan by a security guard, who tackled him and then threw him against a monitor, injuring his arm and breaking two of his teeth. Broadcast on pay-per-view to millions of people, this performance was widely noticed internationally and sales of the album rose sharply.

Further controversy followed the band only weeks later at a free concert in Boston. Alternative radio station WFNX hosted a free Green Day concert at the Hatch Memorial Shell concert venue on September 9, 1994. However, the promoters were accustomed to hosting reggae and acts of similar softness that drew smaller crowds, and were unprepared for the audience of 70,000 to 100,000 people. The fans in attendance were already chanting for Green Day during the show's opening act. After several calls for calm, including some from Armstrong, the group began their performance, but the singer let himself be carried away by the energy of the audience and jumped into the middle of it during "Longview", the seventh song of the set. The security forces, overwhelmed and fearing that the lighting fixtures would collapse, forcibly ended the concert by cutting off the power. A riot ensued and spilled into the streets, leading to numerous arrests and injuries. The Massachusetts State Police were called. Roughly 100 people were injured and 31 were arrested in the aftermath of the concert. In 2006, the Boston Phoenix would list the Green Day Hatch Shell "riot" concert as the sixth-greatest concert in Boston history.

When the band returned to Europe in October 1994, the venues in which they played were much larger, and the band was met with much more enthusiasm. Despite their new notoriety for live performances, the trio continued to sell tickets at affordable prices: $5 to $20 (equivalent to $11 to $40 in 2025). Warner proposed several groups to play as opening acts on this tour, but the band rejected these; instead, the band invited German punk band Die Toten Hosen and the American queercore group Pansy Division to join their shows. Following the European shows, the band returned home for one last show at the Z100 Acoustic Christmas at Madison Square Garden in New York. An AIDS benefit show, Armstrong performed the song "She" naked, using his guitar to cover himself.

In 2013, the band played Dookie in its entirety at some European dates as a celebration of the album's upcoming 20th anniversary. On October 19, 2023, at the Fremont Country Club in Las Vegas, Dookie was played in its entirety as part of the evening's 29-song set, including "All by Myself". The album was played in celebration of its upcoming 30th anniversary and announcement of the 2024 tour.

== Track listing ==
All lyrics are written by Billie Joe Armstrong, except where noted; all music is composed by Green Day.

Original compact disc release
No.	Title	Lyrics	Length
1.	"Burnout"		2:07
2.	"Having a Blast"		2:44
3.	"Chump"		2:53
4.	"Longview"		3:59
5.	"Welcome to Paradise"		3:44
6.	"Pulling Teeth"		2:30
7.	"Basket Case"		3:02
8.	"She"		2:13
9.	"Sassafras Roots"		2:37
10.	"When I Come Around"		2:57
11.	"Coming Clean"		1:34
12.	"Emenius Sleepus"	Mike Dirnt	1:43
13.	"In the End"		1:46
14.	"F.O.D." (includes hidden track "All by Myself" written and performed by Tré Cool (Note: "F.O.D." ends at 2:52, followed by hidden track "All by Myself" which starts at 4:09. Digital editions and certain vinyl pressings list a distinct track 15.))		5:46
Total length:			39:35

=== 30th Anniversary Deluxe Edition ===
All tracks on Disc 3 are subtitled "Live at Woodstock 1994". All tracks on Disc 4 are subtitled "Live at Garatge Club, Barcelona 1994".

Disc 2: Demos & Outtakes
No.	Title	Lyrics	Music	Length
1.	"Burnout (4-Track Demo)"			2:06
2.	"Chump (4-Track Demo)"			2:14
3.	"Pulling Teeth (4-Track Demo)"			2:18
4.	"Basket Case (4-Track Demo)"			3:07
5.	"She (4-Track Demo)"			2:15
6.	"Sassafras Roots (4-Track Demo)"			2:33
7.	"When I Come Around (4-Track Demo)"			2:01
8.	"In the End (4-Track Demo)"			1:54
9.	"F.O.D. (4-Track Demo)"			2:55
10.	"When It's Time (4-Track Demo)"			2:35
11.	"When I Come Around (Cassette Demo)"			3:00
12.	"Basket Case (Cassette Demo)"			2:57
13.	"Longview (Cassette Demo)"			3:54
14.	"Burnout (Cassette Demo)"			2:06
15.	"Haushinka (Cassette Demo)"			3:32
16.	"J.A.R. (Jason Andrew Relva) [Cassette Demo]"	Mike Dirnt		3:01
17.	"Having a Blast (Cassette Demo)"			2:49
18.	"Christie Rd. (Outtake)"			3:45
19.	"409 In Your Coffeemaker (Outtake)"		Billie Joe Armstrong, Mike Dirnt, John Kiffmeyer	2:49
20.	"J.A.R. (Jason Andrew Relva) [Outtake]"	Mike Dirnt		2:51
21.	"On the Wagon (Outtake)"			2:47
22.	"Tired of Waiting for You (Outtake)" (The Kinks Cover)	Ray Davies		2:32
23.	"Walking the Dog (Demo) [Outtake]" (Rufus Thomas Cover)	Rufus Thomas		2:50

Disc 3: Live at Woodstock 1994
No.	Title	Music	Length
1.	"Welcome to Paradise"		5:14
2.	"One of My Lies"		3:05
3.	"Chump"		2:35
4.	"Longview"		3:37
5.	"Basket Case"		3:16
6.	"When I Come Around"		2:45
7.	"Burnout"		2:30
8.	"F.O.D."		2:35
9.	"Paper Lanterns"	Billie Joe Armstrong, Mike Dirnt, John Kiffmeyer	8:15
10.	"Shit Show" (Outro of the show, no music)		5:53

CD 4: Live at Garatge Club, Barcelona 1994
No.	Title	Lyrics	Music	Length
1.	"Welcome to Paradise"			4:18
2.	"One of My Lies"			2:39
3.	"Chump"			2:35
4.	"Longview"			3:22
5.	"Burnout"			2:04
6.	"Only of You"		Billie Joe Armstrong, Mike Dirnt, John Kiffmeyer	3:11
7.	"When I Come Around"			2:49
8.	"2000 Light Years Away"		Green Day, Jesse Michaels, Pete Rypins, Dave E.C.	3:05
9.	"Going to Pasalacqua"		Billie Joe Armstrong, Mike Dirnt, John Kiffmeyer	3:39
10.	"Knowledge" (Operation Ivy Cover)	Jesse Michaels
11.	"Basket Case"			2:48
12.	"Paper Lanterns"		Billie Joe Armstrong, Mike Dirnt, John Kiffmeyer	8:25
13.	"Dominated Love Slave"	Tré Cool		1:55
14.	"F.O.D."			2:30
15.	"Road to Acceptance"		Billie Joe Armstrong, Mike Dirnt, John Kiffmeyer	6:39
16.	"Christie Rd."			3:26
17.	"Disappearing Boy"			3:46

== Personnel ==
Credits are adapted from the album's liner notes.

Green Day

- Billie Joe Armstrong – lead vocals, guitar
- Mike Dirnt – bass guitar, backing vocals
- Tré Cool – drums; lead vocals and guitar on "All by Myself"

Technical personnel

- Rob Cavallo – production, mixing
- Green Day – production, mixing
- "Huckle" Jerry Finn – mixing
- Neil King – engineering
- Casey McCrankin – additional engineering

Artwork

- Richie Bucher – cover illustration
- Ken Schles – photography
- Pat Hynes – insert artwork

== Charts ==
=== Weekly charts ===
Weekly chart performance for Dookie
Chart (1994–2006)	Peak position
Australian Albums (ARIA)	1
Austrian Albums (Ö3 Austria)	4
Belgian Albums (Ultratop Flanders)	13
Belgian Albums (Ultratop Wallonia)	13
Canada Top Albums/CDs (RPM)	1
Danish Albums (Hitlisten)	6
Dutch Albums (Album Top 100)	5
Europe (European Top 100 Albums)	3
Finnish Albums (Suomen virallinen lista)	5
German Albums (Offizielle Top 100)	4
Greek Albums (IFPI)	33
Hungarian Albums (MAHASZ)	8
Irish Albums (IRMA)	38
Italian Albums (FIMI)	10
Japanese Albums (Oricon)	32
New Zealand Albums (RMNZ)	1
Norwegian Albums (VG-lista)	9
Portuguese Albums (AFP)	4
Scottish Albums (Official Charts)	17
Spanish Albums (AFYVE)	6
Swedish Albums (Sverigetopplistan)	3
Swiss Albums (Schweizer Hitparade)	6
UK Albums (Official Charts)	13
UK Rock & Metal Albums (Official Charts)	1
US Billboard 200	2
US Heatseekers Albums (Billboard)	1
US Top Catalog Albums (Billboard)	10
US Vinyl Albums (Billboard)	9

=== Year-end charts ===
1994 year-end chart performance for Dookie
Chart (1994)	Position
Canada Top Albums/CDs (RPM)	32
US Billboard 200	24

1995 year-end chart performance for Dookie
Chart (1995)	Position
Australian Albums (ARIA)	10
Austrian Albums (Ö3 Austria)	4
Belgian Albums (Ultratop Flanders)	36
Belgian Albums (Ultratop Wallonia)	28
Canada Top Albums/CDs (RPM)	2
Dutch Albums (Album Top 100)	32
European Top 100 Albums (Music & Media)	7
German Albums (Offizielle Top 100)	6
New Zealand Albums (RMNZ)	4
Spanish Albums (AFYVE)	26
Swedish Albums & Compilations (Sverigetopplistan)	26
Swiss Albums (Schweizer Hitparade)	5
UK Albums (OCC)	53
US Billboard 200	7

2001 year-end chart performance for Dookie
Chart (2001)	Position
UK Albums (OCC)	199

2002 year-end chart performance for Dookie
Chart (2002)	Position
Canadian Alternative Albums (Nielsen SoundScan)	159
Canadian Metal Albums (Nielsen SoundScan)	79

2005 year-end chart performance for Dookie
Chart (2005)	Position
UK Albums (OCC)	154

=== Decade-end charts ===
Decade-end chart performance for Dookie
Chart (1990–1999)	Position
US Billboard 200	33

== Certifications and sales ==
Region	Certification	Certified units/sales
Argentina (CAPIF)	Platinum	60,000^{^}
Australia (ARIA)	5× Platinum	350,000^{^}
Austria (IFPI Austria)	Platinum	50,000^{*}
Belgium (BRMA)	Gold	25,000^{*}
Brazil (Pro-Música Brasil)	Gold	100,000^{*}
Canada (Music Canada)	Diamond	1,000,000^{^}
Denmark (IFPI Danmark)	4× Platinum	80,000^{‡}
Finland (Musiikkituottajat)	Gold	35,205
France (SNEP)	Gold	100,000^{*}
Germany (BVMI)	3× Gold	750,000^{^}
Ireland (IRMA)	4× Platinum	60,000^{^}
Italy sales in 1995	—	250,000
Italy (FIMI) sales since 2009	Platinum	50,000^{‡}
Japan (RIAJ)	Platinum	200,000^{^}
Mexico	—	50,000
Netherlands (NVPI)	Gold	50,000^{^}
New Zealand (RMNZ)	4× Platinum	60,000^{‡}
Poland (ZPAV)	Gold	50,000^{*}
Spain (Promusicae)	Platinum	100,000^{^}
Sweden (GLF)	Gold	50,000^{^}
Switzerland (IFPI Switzerland)	Gold	25,000^{^}
United Kingdom (BPI)	3× Platinum	900,000^{^}
United States (RIAA)	2× Diamond	20,000,000^{‡}
Summaries
Europe (IFPI)	Platinum	1,000,000^{*}
^{*} Sales figures based on certification alone.^{^} Shipments figures based on certification alone.^{‡} Sales+streaming figures based on certification alone.
