= 2020 in rock music =

This article summarizes the events related to rock music for the year of 2020.

== Events ==
=== January ===
- The 62nd Annual Grammy Awards are held in the United States on January 26, 2020. Tool, I Prevail, and Rival Sons are all nominated for multiple Grammy Awards. Tool wins a Grammy Award for their song "7empest". Other nominees include Candlemass (Sweden), The Cranberries (Ireland) and Bones UK (UK).
- Aerosmith receive the MusiCares Person of the Year honor, an award given to musicians for artistic achievement and philanthropy in the music industry.
- Ozzy Osbourne's single "Under the Graveyard" tops the Billboard Mainstream Rock Songs chart for six weeks, in a run that began in December 2019.
- Bad Wolves single "Killing Me Slowly" tops the Mainstream Rock chart. Of the band's four singles releases at the time, it is the third to top the chart.
- Shinedown's single "Attention Attention" tops the Billboard Mainstream Rock chart for a single week. It is the bands fifteenth career song to top the chart, tying Three Days Grace for the band with the most number ones on the chart.
- Breaking Benjamin release their album Aurora, an album of acoustic and alternate takes of prior songs from their catalogue. Guest vocalists include Lacey Sturm previously of Flyleaf, Adam Gontier of Three Days Grace and Saint Asonia, and Spencer Chamberlain of Underoath. The album was the third best-selling album on the Billboard Top Album Sales chart.

=== February ===
- At the 2020 Brit Awards, held in London on February 18, there are live performances from Johnny Marr and Rod Stewart. Bruce Springsteen is among the nominees for International Male Solo Artist, and Foals win Best British Group.
- Theory of a Deadman's single "History of Violence" tops the Billboard Mainstream Rock chart for a single week.
- Green Day release their thirteenth studio album, Father of All Motherfuckers (often shortened to Father of All...). The album tops the UK and Australian national, all-format album charts. In the US, it debuts and peaks at number 4 on the US Billboard 200 chart. The album will focuses on short, succinct songs, clocking in at only 26 minutes long. Frontman Billie Joe Armstrong explained that the album title had no real meaning other than "just being a badass title".
- Ozzy Osbourne releases his twelfth solo studio album Ordinary Man, his first solo album in ten years, and the highest-charting album of his solo career, entering the Billboard 200 at no. 3 and selling 77,000 album equivalent units. Osbourne quickly recorded the album after feeling inspiration from recording his guest vocals on the Post Malone and Travis Scott song "Take What You Want". It features performances from drummer Chad Smith (Red Hot Chili Peppers), bassist Duff McKagen (Guns N' Roses), guitarist/producer Andrew Watt, as well as guest spots by Slash (Guns N' Roses), Post Malone, and Elton John.
- Five Finger Death Punch's single "Inside Out" tops the Billboard Mainstream Rock chart for four nonconsecutive weeks. The band also releases their eighth studio album F8, which enters the Billboard 200 chart at no 2 and sells 55,000 album equivalent units in its opening week. The album also tops the Billboard Top Hard Rock Albums chart. It is the band's seventh album to do so, making them tied with Linkin Park for band to top the chart the most time since its inception in 2007. The album is themed around the troubles the band had faced over the last few years, including an extended legal battle with their past record label, frontman Ivan Moody's public struggle with substance abuse to the point of almost dying, and the departure of long-time drummer Jeremy Spencer.
- Veteran UK glam rock band Slade sack their drummer Don Powell, who responds by announcing he will set up a rival group called "Don Powell's Slade".

=== March ===
- The COVID-19 pandemic causes musical events around the world to be postponed or cancelled, as the virus is highly contagious, and health and government officials instate social distancing measures making the events impossible. Rock events postponed include the Asian leg of the Hella Mega Tour (featuring Green Day, Weezer, and Fall Out Boy), the Rage Against the Machine reunion tour, latter dates of the My Chemical Romance reunion tour, parts of Kiss' "End of the Road World Tour," and the 2020 Rock and Roll Hall of Fame induction ceremony.
- In light of the social distancing measures, many artists instead decide to live-stream live performances straight out of their own homes. Of note is the internationally televised iHeart Living Room Concert for America event, which featured live acoustic performances by Dave Grohl of the Foo Fighters and Billie Joe Armstrong of Green Day.
- The Glastonbury Festival celebrates its 50th anniversary on March 18. The festival, which was to have featured Manic Street Preachers and Sinéad O'Connor, is cancelled because of restrictions imposed as a result of the COVID-19 pandemic. In its place, the BBC broadcasts a virtual festival including recorded highlights of previous years' festivals, including classic performances by The Rolling Stones, Patti Smith, Youssou N'Dour and David Bowie.
- Welsh band Stereophonics are heavily criticized for not cancelling their concert in Cardiff, Wales, following the COVID-19 outbreak.
- I Prevail single "Hurricane" tops the Billboard Mainstream Rock chart and stays there for two weeks.
- Volbeat's single "Die to Live" tops the Billboard Mainstream Rock chart for a single week, the eighth of their singles to do so; as a result they tie with U2 for European band with most songs topping the chart.
- Green Day's single "Oh Yeah!" tops the Billboard Mainstream Rock chart for a week.
- Pearl Jam releases their eleventh studio album, Gigaton, their first album since 2013. It debuts at number 5 on the Billboard 200, selling 63,000 album equivalent units. The album performed particularly well on vinyl, selling 14,000 copies, the second highest week for a 2020 release at the time.

=== April ===
- Breaking Benjamin's single "Far Away", featuring Scooter Ward of the band Cold, tops the Billboard Mainstream Rock chart. It is the band's seventh song to top the chart, and Ward's first. It stays there for three consecutive weeks.
- Dance Gavin Dance releases their ninth studio album, Afterburner. The album debuts at number 14 on the Billboard 200, selling over 23,000 copies. The achievement is rare, as the Coronavirus pandemic led to the band releasing no physical copies of the album, and rock music often relying more on physical sales than digital and streaming in comparison to other genre. It is just short of being the band's best-selling debut as well.
- The Killers single "Caution", which features a guitar solo from Lindsey Buckingham (Fleetwood Mac), tops the Billboard Rock Airplay and Alternative Songs charts. It is their first song to top the Rock Airplay chart, and their first in 13 years to top the Alternative Songs chart, a record, when their single "When You Were Young" topped the chart.
- The ongoing COVID-19 pandemic continues the trend of musicians livestreaming performances, especially of cover songs:

- Rapper Post Malone livestreams and entire concert of sung Nirvana covers with Travis Barker of Blink 182 on drums.
- Miley Cyrus, alongside Andrew Watt on guitar, performs an acoustic cover of Pink Floyd's Wish You Were Here" on a nationally televised segment on Saturday Night Live.
- Chris Martin of Coldplay performs a solo cover of Bob Dylan's "Shelter from the Storm" on Saturday Night Live.
- Billie Joe Armstrong of Green Day performs a solo rendition of "Wake Me Up When September Ends" on the nationally televised One World Together at Home event.

- After being forced to cancel their farewell tour by the COVID-19 pandemic, Swiss band Krokus announce plans to reschedule the dates for 2021.
- The organizers of the French rock festival Hellfest, previously scheduled for June, tell fans that their insurance company, Albingia, has reneged on their contract and is refusing to pay for the cancellation of the 2020 festival, because, Albingia claimed, "respiratory diseases were excluded from the contract".
- Two weeks after its cancelled cinema release, Chunky Shrapnel, a concert film by Australian band King Gizzard & the Lizard Wizard, is digitally premièred on Vimeo on-demand.

=== May ===
- Rammstein cancel their scheduled European tour (including Germany, Austria, Poland, Holland, Belgium, Norway, Sweden, Denmark and the UK) because of COVID-19 restrictions, with plans to reschedule the dates for 2021.
- The Strokes release their sixth studio album, The New Abnormal, their first album in seven years. It debuts at number 8, selling 35,000 album equivalent units. It is their fifth album to land in the top 10 of the chart.
- Hayley Williams, frontwoman of the band Paramore, releases her first solo studio album, Petals for Armor. The album tops the Billboard Top Rock Albums chart. This makes William the first female musician to top the chart both as a solo artist and as a band member, having also done so with Paramore's 2017 album After Laughter.
- A cover of the Foo Fighters single "Times Like These", tops the UK all-format singles chart. The song is a benefit charity single related to COVID-19, and features a wide-variety of artists doing short vocal takes, including Chris Martin of Coldplay, Biffy Clyro, Dua Lipa, Hailee Steinfeld, and Dave Grohl himself.

=== June ===
- Billboard Magazine introduces the Hot Hard Rock Songs and Hot Alternative Songs charts, while renaming its Hot Rock Songs chart to Hot Rock & Alternative Songs as it broadens the chart's criteria to include more pop/electronic/R&B alternative songs. The Hot Hard Rock Songs chart will measure the success of "guitar-based rock songs with a heavier edge" using the Hot 100 methodology of streaming, sales, and overall radio airplay in the United States.
- Bad Wolves' single "Sober" tops the Billboard Mainstream Rock songs chart and stays there for two weeks.
- Five Finger Death Punch single "A Little Bit Off" tops the Billboard Mainstream Rock songs chart.
- After previously postponing their North American Fear Inoculum tour, Tool decides to cancel the tour outright, citing the desire to give money back to ticket buyers rather than hold on to their money until 2021 to reschedule, due to economic hardship caused by the coronavirus.
- Liam Gallagher releases a MTV Unplugged live solo album, which tops the UK all-format albums chart for a week.

=== July ===
- Bring Me the Horizon's single "Parasite Eve" tops the UK Rock & Metal singles chart for a week. It additionally tops the Billboard Hot Hard Rock chart in its first full week of tracking.
- South African recording artist Shaun Morgan, of the band Seether, tops the Billboard Hard Rock Songwriters chart, due to the success of the band's single "Dangerous" and promotional song "Bruised and Broken" charting well concurrently.
- Static-X releases their seventh studio album Project Regeneration. The album is the first to be released posthumously after the death of frontman and band founder Wayne Static in 2014. The album uses vocal tracks of Static recorded prior to his death, during the Shadow Zone and Start a War recording sessions. A fair amount of controversy arose leading up to its release, including the recording of an album without Wayne Static's consent, using an anonymous singer in touring that was dressed like a deceased Wayne Static, and accusations from ex-guitarist Tripp Eisen that he had not been allowed to participate despite being a major contributor during the Shadow Zone and Start a War sessions the material originated from, feeling that they were "violating the memory" with changes being made to the content written during the time.
- Mongolian band The Hu top the UK Rock & Metal Albums Chart with the deluxe edition re-release of their 2019 debut album The Gereg, newly released with guest vocals by Jacoby Shaddix, From Ashes to New, and Lzzy Hale.

=== August ===
- Shinedown tops the Billboard Mainstream Rock chart for a week with their song "Atlas Falls". It is their sixteenth song to top the chart, making them the band with the most number ones on the chart in its almost 40 years of existence.
- American rapper Machine Gun Kelly, in his efforts to move into a more rock-oriented pop punk direction, releases the single "My Ex's Best Friend". The song is a rare rock song to cross over into the all-format Billboard Hot 100, debuting at number 82 on the chart. It later peaked at number 68 after a nationally televised performance of the song on the MTV Video Music Awards.
- Weezer's single "Hero" concurrently tops the Billboard Rock Airplay and Alternative Airplay charts. With the latter chart, it makes the band, along with Green Day, the only bands to top the chart in three separate decades.
- The Killers release their sixth studio album, Imploding the Mirage. It tops the UK and Australian all-format album charts, moving 50,000 copies on the former chart. In the US, it fares worse, reaching number 8, and moving 37,000 album equivalent units.
- Biffy Clyro tops the UK all-format album's chart with their ninth studio album, A Celebration of Endings. It is the band's third consecutive album to top the chart.
- Linkin Park announce a 20th anniversary release of their debut studio album Hybrid Theory, and release the previously unreleased song from the 1999 recording sessions for it, "She Couldn't".
- Metallica releases S&M2, a live album recorded with the San Francisco Symphony. It tops the Billboard Top Rock Albums chart, Hard Rock Albums chart, and Classical Albums chart, and reaches number 4 on the all-format Billboard 200 chart, moving 56,000 units. The album's lead single, a rendition of "All Within My Hands", tops the Billboard Mainstream Rock songs chart for four consecutive weeks. This make the band the first to have four different songs top the chart in four different decades.

=== September ===
- American rapper Machine Gun Kelly, in a large style change, releases his first pop punk album, Tickets to My Downfall. The album, his fifth overall, topped the US Billboard 200 all-format albums chart in its opening week, moving 126,000 album equivalent units. This makes it the best debut of his career to date, tripling the opening numbers for his prior album, Hotel Diablo in 2019, and made it the first rock album to top the chart in just over a year, since Tool's album Fear Inoculum in September 2019.
- A number of Machine Gun Kelly's songs cross-over to chart on the Billboard Hot 100 all-format chart on album release week too, including "My Ex's Best Friend" at number 28, "Forget Me Too" at number 44, "Bloody Valentine" at number 50, and "Drunk Face" at number 91.
- Deftones release their ninth studio album, Ohms. It debuts at number five at on the Billboard 200, moving 49,000 album equivalent units. All ten songs from the album charted on Billboard's Hot Hard Rock chart upon release as well. The album was recorded in 2019, but not ready for release in the same year. Frontman Chino Moreno has stated that Stephen Carpenter's guitar riffs are more in the forefront of the album, and called it an experimental album similar to White Pony.
- UK rock band Doves reform and release their first album in over a decade, their fifth studio album The Universal Want. The album tops the UK all-format albums chart upon release week.

=== October ===
- Foo Fighters and Rise Against are among acts scheduled to participate in the online streaming performance for "Save Our Stages Fest," an effort to raise money for all those hurt by COVID-19's halting of the live music industry.
- Machine Gun Kelly's Tickets to My Downfall, in a rare feat for rock albums, remains in the top 10 of the Billboard 200 chart for multiple weeks after its debut, charting at number 6 in its second week, and rising to number 5 in its third week.
- British singer Cliff Richard, an early rock star, celebrates his 80th birthday by releasing a new album, as well as publishing a photograph of him as a child in India, where he was born.
- Forty-two years after its initial release, Fleetwood Mac's album Rumours returns to the top ten of the Billboard 200 chart, largely due to the song Dreams being used in a viral TikTok video.
- Bruce Springsteen releases his 20th studio album, Letter to You, which is his first album in six years. It debuts at number 2 on the Billboard 200, making Springsteen the first artist to have a top five album across six separate decades.
- Bring Me the Horizon becomes the first band to have three songs top the Billboard Hot Hard Rock songs chart, with "Parasite Eve", "Obey", and "Teardrops" all topping the chart on separate weeks.
- Jack White performs live on the U.S. nationally televised show Saturday Night Live, paying tribute to Eddie Van Halen by using one of Van Halen's signature guitars for the song "Lazaretto".

=== November ===
- Foo Fighters perform live on US National televised show Saturday Night Live on November 7, where they debut their new single, "Shame Shame".
- System of a Down surprise releases its first new music in over 15 years - two songs "Protect the Land" and "Genocidal Humanoidz". The songs are released to bring awareness of the 2020 Nagorno-Karabakh war. Despite the song's release, the band retains its stance that another studio album is unlikely due to the band's internal strife and disagreements on how to proceed on it. The songs debut at number 1 and 2 respectively on the Billboard Hot Hard Rock songs chart.
- Wolfgang Van Halen, son of Eddie Van Halen, releases his debut song, "Distance", under the monniker "Mammoth WVH". The song is an ode to his father, and features Wolfgang playing all instruments and vocals. It debut upon the top of the Billboard Hot Hard Rock chart.
- AC/DC releases their seventeenth studio album, Power Up. It debuts at No. 1 on the Billboard 200 all-format albums chart and at the top of the US and UK album sales chart. Similar to Machine Gun Kelly, the band released the album in hopes of inspiring a younger generation to get into guitar-based rock music, though unlike Kelly, they stuck with their established rock sound for the album.
- Smashing Pumpkins release Cyr, a double album, on November 27, 2020. Frontman Billy Corgan considers it the first real album to be released since the reformation of 3/4 of the band's original lineup in 2018, discounting the eight song Shiny and Oh So Bright album. The album is the bands worst performing album to date, debuting at number 86 on the Billboard 200 chart, lower than Shiny, the previous low, at number 54.

=== December ===
- British musician Yungblud releases his second studio album, Weird!. It tops the UK Albums Chart upon release.
- The Foo Fighters song "Shame Shame" tops the Billboard Mainstream Rock songs chart, their ninth song to do so.
- American rock band Trapt is removed from all major social media mediums after the band's official account makes a series of controversial comments, including voicing support of The Proud Boys and statutory rape.

=== Year-end ===
- During the 2020 US presidential election, many rock musicians oppose Donald Trump's unauthorized use of their music.
- Reports in both the US and the UK show that the COVID-19 pandemic and subsequent shutdowns and self-isolations lead to increased interest and sales of electric guitars related to increased interest in learning to play guitar. Despite this, towards the end of the year, major guitar retailer Guitar Center files for bankruptcy, though without plans to close.

== Deaths ==
- Bo Winberg, former drummer of The Spotnicks, died on January 3, 2020, at the age of 80.
- Neil Peart, drummer of Rush, died on January 7, 2020, at the age of 67 from brain cancer.
- Saskia Post, Australian actress and co-star of the 1980s punk film Dogs in Space, died on March 16, 2020, aged 59, of a cardiac arrest.
- Drummer Bill Rieflin, best known for his work with King Crimson, Ministry, and R.E.M. died at the age of 59 on March 24, 2020, following a battle with cancer.
- Adam Schlesinger, co-founder, bassist, and songwriter, of Fountains of Wayne ("Stacy's Mom"), died at the age of 52 on April 1, 2020, due to COVID-19 related complications.
- Brian Howe, former singer of the band Bad Company, died on May 6, 2020, at 66.
- Little Richard, one of the pioneers of rock and roll, died on May 9, 2020, at 87.
- Charlie Monttana, Mexican rock urbano singer, died on May 28, 2020, aged 58, of a heart attack.
- Paul Chapman, 66, Welsh rock guitarist (UFO, Lone Star), died on June 9, 2020, aged 66.
- Yuji "You" Adachi, guitarist and composer of Dead End, died from sepsis on June 16, 2020, at the age of 56.
- Graeme Williamson, Scottish rock singer, died of a stroke on June 25, 2020, aged 71.
- Ken Chinn, punk rock vocalist (SNFU) died on July 16, 2020, aged 57.
- Dominic Sonic, French singer, died on July 23, 2020, aged 55.
- Peter Green, co-founder of Fleetwood Mac, died on July 25, at the age of 73.
- Mark Wirtz, French-German record producer, composer, singer, musician, author, and comedian, died on August 7, aged 76.
- Božidar Tanasković, Serbian rock bassist (Bjesovi), died on August, 30.
- Peter Starkie, Australian bassist (Skyhooks), died on September 14, aged 72.
- Eddie Van Halen, Dutch-American rock musician (Van Halen) died on October 6, aged 65.
- Paul Matters, Australian bassist (AC/DC), died on October 14.
- James Broad, British vocalist and guitarist (Silver Sun), died in late October, following a battle with cancer.
- Ken Hensley, co-founder and co-writer for British rock-band Uriah Heep, died on November 4, aged 75.
- Dariusz Malinowski, vocalist and guitarist of Polish band Siekiera, died on December 12, aged 54/55
- Andrey Sapunov, singer and bassist of the Russian band Voskreseniye, died on December 13, aged 64
- Pepe Salvaderi, guitarist and singer of the Italian "beat-pop-rock" band Dik Dik), died on December 19.
- Alexi Laiho, 41, singer and guitarist of Finnish death metal band Children of Bodom, died on December 29.

== Band breakups ==
- Stone Sour
- Red Sun Rising
- Dream On, Dreamer (Australian band)
- Unlocking the Truth

== Bands reformed ==
- The Format
