= Still Breathing (Green Day song) =

2016 single by Green Day

Single by Green Day

from the album Revolution Radio
- Released: September 23, 2016
- Genre: Pop-punk; alternative rock
- Length: 3:44
- Label: Reprise
- Songwriters: Billie Joe Armstrong; Mike Dirnt; Tré Cool; Rick Parkhouse; Adam Slack; Luke Spiller; George Tizzard; Josh Wilkinson
- Producer: Green Day

Green Day singles chronology
"Revolution Radio" (2016)	"Still Breathing" (2016)	"Father of All..." (2019)

Music video
- "Still Breathing" on YouTube

"Still Breathing" is a song by American rock band Green Day from their twelfth studio album, Revolution Radio (2016). Written and produced by the band, the lyrics explore the idea of overcoming adversity in the face of hardship. "Still Breathing" is a pop-punk song with a pop-like production, which has been stylistically considered a return to form for the band.

A lyric video for "Still Breathing" was released on September 23, 2016, and Reprise Records made the song available for digital download the same day as the third single for Revolution Radio. The music video for the song, directed by P. R. Brown and released on November 7, 2016, depicts Billie Joe Armstrong walking solemnly through streets while Mike Dirnt and Tré Cool practice in a warehouse.

"Still Breathing" received critical acclaim from music critics, being considered one of the best songs on Revolution Radio despite some criticism towards its production and lyrics. The song topped the US Alternative Airplay, Mainstream Rock Songs, Rock Airplay, and Canada Rock charts, and appeared on various others. It was included in the setlist of the Revolution Radio Tour, the band's 2016–2017 concert tour in support of the album.

== Background and release ==
There's a band called 5 Seconds of Summer who wanted me to write a song for them. All of a sudden I was writing the lyrics, and I was like, ‘Oh my God, there's no fucking way I'm giving these guys this song.’ There's all those [lyrics] where it's the last moment of someone’s life — it's so intense. It's just a song about being a survivor.

— Billie Joe Armstrong on the origin and meaning of "Still Breathing" for People.

In 2015, Green Day began recording material at OTIS, Billie Joe Armstrong's studio in Oakland, California, for their twelfth studio album, Revolution Radio. The album was conceived by the band as a "back-to-basics" move, following the rushed ¡Uno! ¡Dos! ¡Tre! trilogy of albums and Armstrong's rehab. Armstrong had previously written "Still Breathing" for the Australian pop rock band 5 Seconds of Summer, but deemed the song too intense.

"Still Breathing" was released on September 23, 2016, as the third single of Revolution Radio (Note: Following Bang Bang, released on August 11, and Revolution Radio, released on September 9.) through a lyric video published on YouTube, and was made available for digital download the same day. Later that year on November 7, 2016, a music video directed by P.R. Brown for the song was released on YouTube. The video features shots of Armstrong walking solemnly through streets while Mike Dirnt and Tré Cool practice in a warehouse, culminating in the band's reunification. Between scenes, various people, including a farmer, a child, and a military veteran, stare pensively as they "find simple salvation in the beauty of nature". "Still Breathing" was later released as part of the band's 2017 greatest hits album God's Favorite Band.

== Composition and lyrics ==
"Still Breathing" is a slow-burning song which begins with "quickly strummed acoustic guitars and a spare beat", before building up to a heavier sound driven by electric guitar in its chorus. Anna Gaca of Spin described "Still Breathing" as a "paint-by-number pop-punk song", while Andrew Sacher of BrooklynVegan instead categorized it as alternative rock and Alternative Press called the song an "emo anthem". The song's production has been labeled as "radio-friendly" in reference to its pop sound. Matt Melis and Collin Brennan of Consequence noted that "Still Breathing" sounded "engineered to sit alongside other motivational pop anthems", while Chris Deville of Stereogum characterized the song as a power ballad with pop sensibilities. The song has been compared to those by Blink-182, due to its "heart-on-sleeve sugar-rush harmonies". The songwriters of the Struts' 2013 song "Could Have Been Me" received co-writing credits on "Still Breathing" due to similarities between the songs' melodies.

The lyrics of "Still Breathing", according to Armstrong, are about being a survivor and overcoming adversity. The song's lyrics are mostly similes about various characters like a gambler and a soldier confronting "all kinds of potential trauma". Gil Kaufman of Billboard suggested that these comparisons ultimately connected to the premise of "slogging through it all to make 'my way to you'". Armstrong also noted the line "I'm still breathing on my own" alludes to how "at some point, we’re all going to have to be on life support". Various critics commented that the lyrics of "Still Breathing" reflect Armstrong's personal struggles with prescription drug addiction and his drug rehabilitation. (Note: Attributed to Rolling Stone's Andy Greene and Daniel Kreps, MTV's Sasha Geffen, and NME's John Earls) However, Armstrong responded that he avoided introspection when writing the song's lyrics in lieu of "mak[ing] people happy" and "creat[ing] a difference in some way, just by people recognizing themselves in the song".

== Critical reception ==
"Still Breathing"
A 22-second sample of "Still Breathing." A pop-punk song, it has been positively received as a return to form for the band, however its "radio-friendly" production has received mixed reviews.

"Still Breathing" received acclaim from music critics. Entertainment Weekly's Kevin O'Donnell praised the song as a "three-minute blast of life-affirming punk", while NME's Rhian Daly called the song an "air-punching punk glory full of strength, power and guts". Multiple critics regarded "Still Breathing" as a highlight on Revolution Radio, (Note: Attributed to Entertainment Weekly's Kevin O'Donnell, Pitchfork's Ivy Nelson, and Alternative Press's Tim Coffman.) with The A.V. Club's Alex McLevy deeming it the "statement of purpose" for the album as an "acknowledgement that most of the time, all we have to hang on to is the knowledge that we’re still alive".

Critics lauded "Still Breathing" as a return to form for the band, with Uproxx's Chris Morgan praising its "Green Day sound" despite being "slightly less snotty and brash as some of their earlier tracks". However, the song's pop-like production was met with mixed reception. Loudwire's Graham Hartmann called the song the "poppiest cut from the album", yet noted it "maintain[ed] that classic Green Day feel". ABC News noted that the song sounded as though it were "written to please bland, modern radio-ballad standards", while Sputnikmusic's Raul Stanciu deemed the song "too light for its own good".

The lyrics of "Still Breathing" were positively received, with critics calling them "inspirational" and "powerful". Morgan wrote how "there’s something about a punk band that has been around for more than 25 years singing a song with lyrics like 'I’m still alive'". Pitchfork's Ivy Nelson praised the song for having "Armstrong's most convincing lyrics" on Revolution Radio, despite being "restricted to the traditional designs of pop-punk". The song's lyrics have also been praised for being "immensely vulnerable", despite DIY's Emma Swann noting that the song's vocals were "not as vulnerable as the lyrics might warrant". However, the lyrics of "Still Breathing" have been criticized for being clichéd, with Spin's Anna Gaca writing that "sometimes overcoming personal challenges and tragedies leads to heartbreaking lyrical insight, and sometimes it leads to 'Still Breathing'". Paste's Reed Strength similarly critiqued the song's lyrics for being "cringe-inducing".

== Chart performance ==
"Still Breathing" peaked at number one on the US Alternative Airplay, Mainstream Rock, and Rock Airplay charts, marking the third time that a single by the band has topped all three charts (after "Know Your Enemy" and "Bang Bang"), and the first time that a single topped all three concurrently. The song also peaked at number 11 on the Hot Rock & Alternative Songs charts. Outside the United States, the song peaked at number one and number two on the Canada Rock and UK Rock & Metal Singles charts, respectively. The song also charted on Belgium's Ultratip Flanders (11), the Czech Republic's Rádio – Top 100 chart (21), Scotland's Singles Sales chart (65), and Slovakia's Rádio – Top 100 chart (82).

== Live performances ==
Green Day first performed "Still Breathing" live as part of their Revolution Radio Tour, the concert tour in support of Revolution Radio which ran from September 26, 2016, to November 19, 2017. The band performed the song on The Ellen DeGeneres Show on December 13, 2016, alongside "American Idiot”. On March 21, 2017, the band performed "Still Breathing" on The Late Show with Stephen Colbert. Critics generally praised the performance, calling it "hard-hitting" and "ear-pummeling", but Zac Gelfand of Uproxx noted that Armstrong's vocals sounded "strained" due to the Revolution Radio Tour. Green Day performed the song on The Late Late Show with James Corden on May 4, 2017. On May 19, 2017, the band performed the song in Central Park as part of their setlist for Good Morning America’s televised "Summer Concerts" series. The band later performed the song as part of the setlist of the Hella Mega Tour, a concert tour with Fall Out Boy and Weezer which ran from July 24, 2021, to July 2, 2022. The band also performed the song on January 30, 2025, as part of their setlist at FireAid, a benefit concert held in response to the January 2025 Southern California wildfires; Brittany Spanos and Andy Greene of Rolling Stone called its inclusion "perfect for the occasion", due to its lyrical content.

== Credits and personnel ==
Credits are adapted from Apple Music.

Green Day
- Billie Joe Armstrong – vocals, guitar, songwriter, producer
- Mike Dirnt – vocals, bass guitar, composer, producer
- Tré Cool – drums, composer, lyricist, producer
Additional personnel
- Adam Slack – composer, lyricist
- George Tizzard – composer, lyricist
- Josh Wilkinson – composer, lyricist
- Rick Parkhouse – composer, lyricist
- Luke Spiller – composer
- Andrew Scheps – mixing engineer
- Chris Dugan – audio engineer
- Éric Boulanger – mastering engineer
- Justin Hergett – assistant mixing engineer

== Charts ==
=== Weekly charts ===
Weekly chart performance for "Still Breathing"
Chart (2016–2017)	Peak position
Belgium (Ultratip Bubbling Under Flanders)	11
Canada Rock (Billboard)	1
Czech Republic Airplay (ČNS IFPI)	21
Slovakia Airplay (ČNS IFPI)	82
Scottish Singles Sales (Official Charts)	65
UK Singles Downloads (Official Charts)	78
UK Rock & Metal (Official Charts)	2
US Adult Pop Airplay (Billboard)	40
US Hot Rock & Alternative Songs (Billboard)	11
US Rock & Alternative Airplay (Billboard)	1

=== Year-end charts ===
Year-end chart performance for "Still Breathing"
Chart (2017)	Position
US Hot Rock Songs (Billboard)	30
US Rock Airplay (Billboard)	4

== Release history ==
Release history for "Still Breathing"
Region	Date	Format(s)	Label	Ref.
Various	September 23, 2016	Digital download; streaming	Reprise	
Italy	September 30, 2016	Radio airplay	Warner	
United States	November 1, 2016	Modern rock radio	Warner	
United States	November 15, 2016	Mainstream rock radio	Warner	
United Kingdom	January 2017	Promotional CD single	Reprise	
