= Greatest Hits: God's Favorite Band =

Greatest hits album by Green Day
- Released: November 17, 2017
- Recorded: May 1991 – October 2017
- Genre: Punk rock
- Length: 75:58
- Label: Reprise
- Producers: Green Day; Rob Cavallo; Butch Vig; Andy Ernst

Green Day chronology
| Revolution Radio (2016) | Greatest Hits: God's Favorite Band (2017) | Woodstock 1994 (2019) |

Professional ratings
Review scores
| Source | Rating |
|---|---|
| AllMusic | 4.5/5 stars |
| Classic Rock | 4/5 stars |
| Dead Press | 7/10 |

Greatest Hits: God's Favorite Band is the second greatest hits album by American rock band Green Day, released on November 17, 2017.

== Background ==
God's Favorite Band features 20 of Green Day's previous hits, as well as two new songs: a new version of the Revolution Radio (2016) track "Ordinary World", featuring country singer Miranda Lambert, and a previously unreleased song entitled "Back in the USA". The album includes songs from all of Green Day's studio albums, with the exception of 39/Smooth (1990), ¡Dos! (2012), and ¡Tré! (2012). 10 of the tracks previously appeared on Green Day's 2001 greatest hits album, International Superhits!. Jason White participated in the recording for "Back in the USA", marking his first studio appearance with the band since the ¡Uno!, ¡Dos!, ¡Tré! trilogy.

The album's title is a reference to a joke made by Stephen Colbert during the band's March 22, 2017, appearance on The Late Show, in which Colbert quipped that Green Day were "God's favorite band". Colbert's joke was in itself a reference to a comment made by Green Day drummer Tré Cool on the band's 2005 DVD Bullet in a Bible, in which Cool remarked that the rain clouds over the venue had cleared because "God wants to watch his favorite band again."

== Track listing ==
All songs were produced by Green Day and Rob Cavallo except: "Know Your Enemy" and "21 Guns", which were produced by Green Day and Butch Vig; "2000 Light Years Away", which was produced by Green Day and Andy Ernst; and "Minority", "Warning", "Bang Bang", "Still Breathing", "Ordinary World", and "Back in the USA", which were produced by Green Day.

All lyrics are written by Billie Joe Armstrong; all music is composed by Green Day (Armstrong, Mike Dirnt, and Tré Cool) except where noted.

| No. | Title | Album | Length |
|---|---|---|---|
| 1. | "2000 Light Years Away" (music written by Green Day, Jesse Michaels, Pete Rypins and Dave "E.C." Henwood) | Kerplunk!, 1991 | 2:25 |
| 2. | "Longview" | Dookie, 1994 | 3:56 |
| 3. | "Welcome to Paradise" | Dookie | 3:45 |
| 4. | "Basket Case" | Dookie | 3:02 |
| 5. | "When I Come Around" | Dookie | 3:00 |
| 6. | "She" | Dookie | 2:15 |
| 7. | "Brain Stew" | Insomniac, 1995 | 3:14 |
| 8. | "Hitchin' a Ride" | Nimrod, 1997 | 2:52 |
| 9. | "Good Riddance (Time of Your Life)" | Nimrod | 2:35 |
| 10. | "Minority" | Warning, 2000 | 2:49 |
| 11. | "Warning" | Warning | 3:43 |
| 12. | "American Idiot" | American Idiot, 2004 | 2:56 |
| 13. | "Holiday" | American Idiot | 3:52 |
| 14. | "Boulevard of Broken Dreams" | American Idiot | 4:22 |
| 15. | "Wake Me Up When September Ends" | American Idiot | 4:45 |
| 16. | "Know Your Enemy" | 21st Century Breakdown, 2009 | 3:11 |
| 17. | "21 Guns" | 21st Century Breakdown | 5:24 |
| 18. | "Oh Love" | ¡Uno!, 2012 | 5:04 |
| 19. | "Bang Bang" | Revolution Radio, 2016 | 3:27 |
| 20. | "Still Breathing" (music written by Green Day, Richard Parkhouse, Adam Slack, Luke Spiller, George Tizzard and Joshua Wilkinson) | Revolution Radio | 3:45 |
| 21. | "Ordinary World" (music written by Billie Joe Armstrong; new duet featuring Miranda Lambert) | original version released on Revolution Radio | 3:01 |
| 22. | "Back in the USA" | Previously unreleased | 2:36 |
| Total length: | | | 75:58 |

== Personnel ==
Green Day

- Billie Joe Armstrong – lead vocals, electric and acoustic guitars, harmonica, piano
- Mike Dirnt – bass, backing vocals
- Tré Cool – drums, percussion, backing vocals, accordion on "Minority"

Additional musicians

- Petra Haden – violin on "Hitchin' a Ride"
- Conan McCallum – violin on "Good Riddance (Time of Your Life)"
- Rob Cavallo – piano
- Jason Freese – piano
- Tom Kitt – string arrangement for "21 Guns"
- David Campbell – string arrangement for "Good Riddance (Time of Your Life)"
- Miranda Lambert – featured vocals on "Ordinary World"
- Jason White – guitar on "Oh Love" and "Back in the USA"

Production

- Green Day – production
- Rob Cavallo – production
- Butch Vig – production
- Andy Ernst – production, engineering, mixing
- Neill King – engineering
- Kevin Army – engineering
- Ken Allardyce – engineering
- Doug McKean – engineering
- Chris Dugan – engineering
- Jerry Finn – mixing
- Chris Lord-Alge – mixing
- Jack Joseph Puig – mixing
- Andrew Scheps – mixing
- John Golden – mastering
- Ted Jensen – mastering
- Eric Boulanger – mastering

== Charts ==
=== Weekly charts ===
2017 weekly chart performance for Greatest Hits: God's Favorite Band
| Chart (2017) | Peak position |
|---|---|
| Australian Albums (ARIA) | 16 |
| Austrian Albums (Ö3 Austria) | 30 |
| Belgian Albums (Ultratop Flanders) | 53 |
| Belgian Albums (Ultratop Wallonia) | 53 |
| Canadian Albums (Billboard) | 37 |
| Czech Albums (ČNS IFPI) | 28 |
| Dutch Albums (Album Top 100) | 77 |
| German Albums (Offizielle Top 100) | 36 |
| Hungarian Albums (MAHASZ) | 22 |
| Irish Albums (IRMA) | 17 |
| Italian Albums (FIMI) | 25 |
| New Zealand Albums (RMNZ) | 21 |
| South Korean International Albums (Gaon) | 3 |
| Scottish Albums (Official Charts) | 23 |
| Spanish Albums (PROMUSICAE) | 32 |
| UK Albums (Official Charts) | 22 |
| US Billboard 200 | 39 |
| US Top Rock Albums (Billboard) | 4 |

2025 weekly chart performance for Greatest Hits: God's Favorite Band
| Chart (2025) | Peak position |
|---|---|
| Greek Albums (IFPI) | 26 |

=== Year-end charts ===
2018 year-end chart performance for Greatest Hits: God's Favorite Band
| Chart (2018) | Position |
|---|---|
| Australian Albums (ARIA) | 92 |
| New Zealand Albums (RMNZ) | 42 |
| US Top Rock Albums (Billboard) | 48 |

2019 year-end chart performance for Greatest Hits: God's Favorite Band
| Chart (2019) | Position |
|---|---|
| Australian Albums (ARIA) | 76 |

2020 year-end chart performance for Greatest Hits: God's Favorite Band
| Chart (2020) | Position |
|---|---|
| Australian Albums (ARIA) | 60 |
| UK Albums (OCC) | 85 |
| US Top Rock Albums (Billboard) | 59 |

2021 year-end chart performance for Greatest Hits: God's Favorite Band
| Chart (2021) | Position |
|---|---|
| Australian Albums (ARIA) | 49 |
| UK Albums (OCC) | 87 |
| US Top Rock Albums (Billboard) | 90 |

2022 year-end chart performance for Greatest Hits: God's Favorite Band
| Chart (2022) | Position |
|---|---|
| Australian Albums (ARIA) | 49 |
| UK Albums (OCC) | 68 |

2023 year-end chart performance for Greatest Hits: God's Favorite Band
| Chart (2023) | Position |
|---|---|
| Australian Albums (ARIA) | 42 |
| UK Albums (OCC) | 55 |

2024 year-end chart performance for Greatest Hits: God's Favorite Band
| Chart (2024) | Position |
|---|---|
| Australian Albums (ARIA) | 40 |
| UK Albums (OCC) | 46 |

2025 year-end chart performance for Greatest Hits: God's Favorite Band
| Chart (2025) | Position |
|---|---|
| Australian Albums (ARIA) | 63 |

== Certifications ==
Certifications for Greatest Hits: God's Favorite Band
| Region | Certification | Certified units/sales |
|---|---|---|
| Australia (ARIA) | 2× Platinum | 140,000^{‡} |
| New Zealand (RMNZ) | 2× Platinum | 30,000^{‡} |
| United Kingdom (BPI) | 2× Platinum | 600,000^{‡} |
^{‡} Sales+streaming figures based on certification alone.
