= Shitshow =

Shitshow may refer to:

- "Shitshow", a song on the 2018 Death Grips album Year of the Snitch
- Sh*tshow!: The Country's Collapsing and the Ratings Are Great, a 2018 book by Charlie LeDuff
- "Shit Show", a song on the 2019 Green Day album Woodstock 1994
- The Shit Show, a radio show hosted by Andy Dick
- The Shit Show, a radio show hosted by Rob Huebel
