= Revolution Radio (song) =

Single by Green Day

from the album Revolution Radio
- Released: September 9, 2016
- Genre: Punk rock; pop-punk
- Length: 3:01
- Label: Reprise
- Songwriters: Billie Joe Armstrong; Mike Dirnt; Tré Cool
- Producer: Green Day

Green Day singles chronology
"Bang Bang" (2016)	"Revolution Radio" (2016)	"Still Breathing" (2016)

Music video
- "Revolution Radio" on YouTube

"Revolution Radio" is a song by American rock band Green Day. It was released on September 9, 2016, as the second single from their twelfth studio album of the same name. The song's music video, filmed at 924 Gilman Street, was released on June 12, 2017.

== Chart performance ==
"Revolution Radio" appeared on the charts back in 2016 after the release of the lyric video, charting at number 22 on the US Hot Rock Songs, number 6 on the UK Rock chart and number 71 in Scotland. Since its single release, it has charted at number 9 on the US Mainstream Rock chart, number 21 on the US Alternative Songs chart, number 22 on the US Rock Airplay chart and number 11 on the Canada rock chart.

== Credits and personnel ==
Credits are adapted from iTunes.

Green Day

- Billie Joe Armstrong – vocals, guitar, songwriter, producer
- Mike Dirnt – vocals, bass guitar, composer, lyrics, producer
- Tré Cool – drums, composer, producer

Additional personnel

- Andrew Scheps – mixing engineer
- Éric Boulanger – mastering engineer
- Chris Dugan – audio engineer
- Justin Hergett – assistant mixing engineer

== Charts ==
Chart (2016–17)	Peak position
Canada Rock (Billboard)	11
Czech Republic Airplay (ČNS IFPI)	21
Scottish Singles Sales (Official Charts)	71
UK Singles Downloads (Official Charts)	85
UK Rock (Official Charts Company)	6
US Hot Rock & Alternative Songs (Billboard)	22
US Alternative Airplay (Billboard)	21
US Mainstream Rock (Billboard)	9
US Rock & Alternative Airplay (Billboard)	22
