= Father of All... (song) =

Single by Green Day

from the album Father of All Motherfuckers
- Released: September 10, 2019
- Genre: Dance-punk
- Length: 2:31
- Label: Reprise
- Songwriters: Billie Joe Armstrong; Mike Dirnt; Tré Cool
- Producers: Butch Walker; Green Day; Chris Dugan

Green Day singles chronology
"Still Breathing" (2016)	"Father of All..." (2019)	"Fire, Ready, Aim" (2019)

Music video
- "Father of All..." on YouTube

"Father of All..." is a song by American rock band Green Day, released as the lead single from their thirteenth studio album, Father of All Motherfuckers, on September 10, 2019.

== Background and composition ==
Lead vocalist Billie Joe Armstrong has stated the song is about "making people feel bad". Armstrong added, "Rock and roll sometimes has become so tame because a lot of rock acts are always trying to look for the feel-good song of the year or something." Despite that, Rolling Stone described the song as "bright, upbeat and a big departure from the tone of 2016's Revolution Radio".

A departure in sound for the band, the song has been described as garage rock revival, garage punk, and dance-punk. Containing dirty guitars, grooving bass, and rolling drums, as well as filtered and falsetto vocals, it has been compared to their tenth studio album, ¡Dos! (2012), and their side-project Foxboro Hot Tubs. The song features a riff from the song "Fire" by the Jimi Hendrix Experience.

== Music video ==
The music video pays homage to the "Guitar Man" portion of the opening number from Elvis Presley's 1968 comeback special. In it, the band performs in front of the dancers in the red background while footage of people doing various movements intervene.

== Charts ==
=== Weekly charts ===
Chart (2019)	Peak position
Canada Rock (Billboard)	1
Czech Republic (Top 20 Modern Rock)	3
New Zealand Hot Singles (RMNZ)	38
Scotland Singles (OCC)	92
US Hot Rock & Alternative Songs (Billboard)	6
US Rock & Alternative Airplay (Billboard)	1

=== Year-end charts ===
Chart (2019)	Position
US Hot Rock Songs (Billboard)	66
US Rock Airplay (Billboard)	30

== Personnel ==
- Billie Joe Armstrong – vocals, guitar
- Mike Dirnt – bass
- Tre Cool – drums, percussion
