= Meet Me on the Roof =

Song by Green Day

from the album Father of All Motherfuckers
- Released: February 7, 2020
- Genre: Pop rock; rock and roll; dance-pop
- Length: 2:39
- Label: Reprise
- Composer: Green Day
- Lyricist: Billie Joe Armstrong
- Producers: Butch Walker; Green Day

Music video
- "Meet Me on the Roof" on YouTube

"Meet Me on the Roof" is a song by the American rock band Green Day from their 2020 album Father of All Motherfuckers.

== Background ==
Green Day front man Billie Joe Armstrong always wanted to write "something different", as he described "Meet Me on the Roof" as "Green Day firing on all cylinders." During an interview with SPIN magazine, Tré Cool singled out "Meet Me on the Roof" as one of his favorite tracks on the album, stating: "I think it's got a really sweet sentiment, but it's also got sort of a cool toughness about it and the vibe is really positive and it sounds classic in a way. It sounds like a hit to me, it sounds like a really big song. That's one of my favorites."

== Composition and lyrics ==
"Meet Me on the Roof" is a dance-pop song, combining 1950s rock and roll with modern pop rock. Its lyrics describe a man who looks up to a girl, hoping her expectations are low enough for her to meet him on the roof for a date.

== Release and reception ==
"Meet Me on the Roof" was generally well received upon release, with critics such as Jordan Blum of Popmatters describing it as having a "tinge of 1950s rock and roll danceability and sleekness that's somewhat appealing". Other critics such as Neil McCormick of the Telegraph calls it "the swing of a Happy Days high school hop, albeit one in which the kids are on drugs and worrying about the apocalypse." When ranking all of Green Day's album tracks, it was placed number 94, stating simply "The undeserved hate for the new Green Day album isn't welcome here. If you disagree, you know where to meet us." Billboard critic Bobby Olivier notes that it could pass for the early work of The Beatles.

== Music video ==
The music video for "Meet Me on the Roof", directed by Brendan Walter and Greg Yagolnitzer, stars actor Gaten Matarazzo, best known for playing Dustin in Stranger Things, as a kid who wants to impress his crush by getting Green Day and the Stunts to perform on the roof of his school. The video also stars Armstrong as "Mad" Willie Jackson.

== Credits and personnel ==
Credits are adapted from the liner notes of Father of All Motherfuckers:

- Billie Joe Armstrong – guitar, vocals
- Mike Dirnt – bass
- Tré Cool – drums, percussion

== Charts ==
Chart (2020)	Peak position
Czech Republic (Top 20 Modern Rock)	6
New Zealand Hot Singles (RMNZ)	36
UK Rock & Metal (OCC)	12
US Hot Rock & Alternative Songs (Billboard)	21
