= Dog Party (band) =

American punk rock band

- Origin: Sacramento, California, US
- Genres: Punk rock
- Years active: 2007–present
- Labels: Brat | Mag + Music, Asian Man Records, Burger Records, Half of Nothing Records, Sneak Dog Records
- Members: Gwendolyn Giles, Lucy Giles
- Website: dogpartylive.com

Dog Party is an American band from Sacramento, California. The band consists of sisters Gwendolyn and Lucy Giles. Their debut album, Dog Party was released in 2009, followed by P.A.R.T.Y in 2011, Lost Control in 2013, Vol.4 in 2015, Til You're Mine in 2016 and Hit & Run in 2018. In 2016 the band opened for Green Day during the North American leg of their Revolution Radio tour.

== Discography ==
=== Albums ===
- Dog Party (2009)
- P.A.R.T.Y. (2011)
- Lost Control (2013)
- Vol.4 (2015)
- Til You're Mine (2016)
- Hit & Run (2018)
- Dangerous (2024)

=== Singles ===
- "Today I Started Loving You Again" (2017)
- "Sings the Beatles" (2019)
- "Bullet in Disguise" (2024)
- "Last Nite" (2024)

=== Guest appearances ===
- Asian Man Music for Asian Man People Vol. 2 (2016)
- More Than Just Another Comp (2023)
