= Revolution Radio Tour =

2016–17 concert tour by Green Day

- Tour by Green Day
- Promotional poster for the tour
- Location: Europe; North America; Oceania; South America
- Associated album: Revolution Radio
- Start date: September 26, 2016
- End date: November 19, 2017
- Legs: 8
- No. of shows: 120

Green Day concert chronology
- 99 Revolutions Tour (2013); Revolution Radio Tour (2016–17); Hella Mega Tour (2021–22)

The Revolution Radio Tour was a concert tour by American rock band Green Day in support of the group's twelfth studio album, Revolution Radio. The tour had 120 dates in North America, South America, Europe, Australia, and New Zealand from September 2016 through November 2017.

== Overview ==
The tour had eight legs. The first leg took place in North America from September to October 2016 in indoor theater venues. The second leg consisted of two shows in December 2016 in North America. The third leg took place in Europe in January and February 2017 in indoor arenas. The fourth leg of the tour took place in indoor arenas in North America from March to April 2017. The fifth leg took place in indoor arenas in Australia and New Zealand in April and May 2017. The sixth leg took place at music festivals, outdoor venues, and arenas in Europe in June and July 2017. The seventh leg took place in both indoor and outdoor venues in North America from August through September 2017. The eighth leg took place in November 2017 in Latin America.

== Tour dates ==
List of 2016 concerts, showing date, city, country, venue, tickets sold, number of available tickets and amount of gross revenue
Date	City	Country	Venue	Attendance	Revenue	Ref.
September 26, 2016	Columbus	United States	Newport Music Hall	—	—	
September 28, 2016	Sayreville	United States	Starland Ballroom	—	—	
September 29, 2016	Upper Darby Township	United States	Tower Theater	—	—	
October 1, 2016	Boston	United States	House of Blues Boston	—	—	
October 3, 2016	Washington, D.C.	United States	9:30 Club	—	—	
October 7, 2016	New York City	United States	Rough Trade NYC	—	—	
October 8, 2016	New York City	United States	Webster Hall	—	—	
October 17, 2016	Los Angeles	United States	Hollywood Palladium	—	—	
October 20, 2016	Berkeley	United States	UC Theatre	—	—	
October 23, 2016	Chicago	United States	Aragon Ballroom	—	—	
October 24, 2016	Detroit	United States	The Fillmore Detroit	—	—	
October 26, 2016	St. Louis	United States	The Pageant	—	—	
December 10, 2016	Oakland	United States	Oracle Arena (Note: The December 10, 2016 performance at the Oracle Arena in Oakland, California was part of Live 105 Not So Silent Night.)	—N/a	—N/a	
December 11, 2016	Inglewood	United States	The Forum (Note: The December 11, 2016 performance at The Forum in Inglewood, California was part of KROQ Almost Acoustic Christmas.)	—N/a	—N/a	

List of 2017 concerts, showing date, city, country, venue, tickets sold, number of available tickets and amount of gross revenue
Date	City	Country	Venue	Attendance	Revenue	Ref.
January 10, 2017	Turin	Italy	Pala Alpitour	—	—	
January 11, 2017	Florence	Italy	Nelson Mandela Forum	—	—	
January 13, 2017	Bologna	Italy	Unipol Arena	—	—	
January 14, 2017	Assago	Italy	Mediolanum Forum	—	—	
January 16, 2017	Zürich	Switzerland	Hallenstadion	14,444 / 14,444	$1,039,290	
January 18, 2017	Mannheim	Germany	SAP Arena	—	—	
January 19, 2017	Berlin	Germany	Mercedes-Benz Arena	13,387 / 13,387	$718,917	
January 21, 2017	Kraków	Poland	Tauron Arena Kraków	—	—	
January 22, 2017	Prague	Czech Republic	Tipsport Arena	—	—	
January 25, 2017	Oslo	Norway	Oslo Spektrum	—	—	
January 27, 2017	Stockholm	Sweden	Ericsson Globe	—	—	
January 28, 2017	Malmö	Sweden	Malmö Arena	—	—	
January 30, 2017	Cologne	Germany	Lanxess Arena	—	—	
January 31, 2017	Amsterdam	Netherlands	Ziggo Dome	—	—	
February 2, 2017	Brussels	Belgium	Forest National	—	—	
February 3, 2017	Paris	France	AccorHotels Arena	—	—	
February 5, 2017	Leeds	England	First Direct Arena	—	—	
February 6, 2017	Manchester	England	Manchester Arena	16,271 / 16,292	$1,125,000	
February 8, 2017	London	England	The O2 Arena	18,292 / 18,936	$1,307,920	
March 1, 2017	Phoenix	United States	Talking Stick Resort Arena	11,778 / 11,778	$517,675	
March 2, 2017	El Paso	United States	El Paso County Coliseum	6,055 / 6,186	$333,772	
March 4, 2017	Dallas	United States	American Airlines Center	13,154 / 13,996	$632,418	
March 5, 2017	Houston	United States	Toyota Center	11,111 / 11,381	$609,263	
March 7, 2017	Tulsa	United States	BOK Center	9,157 / 11,604	$519,083	
March 8, 2017	North Little Rock	United States	Verizon Arena	6,431 / 7,294	$283,891	
March 10, 2017	Duluth	United States	Infinite Energy Arena	10,336 / 10,336	$601,242	
March 12, 2017	Norfolk	United States	Ted Constant Convocation Center	—	—	
March 13, 2017	Washington, D.C.	United States	Verizon Center	13,286 / 13,286	$745,390	
March 15, 2017	New York City	United States	Barclays Center	14,254 / 14,254	$856,150	
March 17, 2017	Worcester	United States	DCU Center	10,984 / 11,413	$566,982	
March 19, 2017	London	Canada	Budweiser Gardens	—	—	
March 20, 2017	Hamilton	Canada	FirstOntario Centre	—	—	
March 22, 2017	Montreal	Canada	Bell Centre	14,245 / 14,245	$692,556	
March 23, 2017	Quebec City	Canada	Videotron Centre	13,766 / 13,766	$670,395	
March 25, 2017	Pittsburgh	United States	Petersen Events Center	9,646 / 9,860	$498,492	
March 27, 2017	Detroit	United States	Joe Louis Arena	12,768 / 13,904	$700,141	
March 28, 2017	Champaign	United States	State Farm Center	7,852 / 9,482	$408,381	
March 30, 2017	Ashwaubenon	United States	Resch Center	7,759 / 7,759	$442,834	
April 1, 2017	Saint Paul	United States	Xcel Energy Center	14,898 / 15,382	$725,821	
April 3, 2017	Des Moines	United States	Wells Fargo Arena	8,441 / 8,441	$486,588	
April 5, 2017	Broomfield	United States	1stBank Center	—	—	
April 7, 2017	Paradise	United States	MGM Grand Garden Arena	11,659 / 11,907	$686,810	
April 8, 2017	San Diego	United States	Valley View Casino Center	11,464 / 11,918	$585,640	
April 30, 2017	Perth	Australia	Perth Arena	8,693 / 9,434	$871,624	
May 3, 2017	Adelaide	Australia	Adelaide Entertainment Centre	6,378 / 6,378	$558,178	
May 5, 2017	Melbourne	Australia	Rod Laver Arena	20,044 / 20,044	$1,924,760	
May 6, 2017	Melbourne	Australia	Rod Laver Arena	20,044 / 20,044	$1,924,760	
May 8, 2017	Brisbane	Australia	Brisbane Entertainment Centre	10,009 / 10,426	$935,588	
May 10, 2017	Sydney	Australia	Qudos Bank Arena	19,328 / 20,952	$1,775,370	
May 11, 2017	Sydney	Australia	Qudos Bank Arena	19,328 / 20,952	$1,775,370	
May 13, 2017	Auckland	New Zealand	Spark Arena	—	—	
May 14, 2017	Auckland	New Zealand	Spark Arena	—	—	
June 4, 2017	Landgraaf	Netherlands	Megaland Park (Note: The June 4, 2017 performance at Megaland Park in Landgraaf was part of Pinkpop Festival.)	—N/a	—N/a	
June 6, 2017	Ljubljana	Slovenia	Arena Stožice	—	—	
June 7, 2017	Munich	Germany	Olympiahalle	—	—	
June 9, 2017	Interlaken	Switzerland	Interlaken Airport (Note: The June 9, 2017 performance at Interlaken Airport in Interlaken was part of Greenfield Festival.)	—N/a	—N/a	
June 11, 2017	Paris	France	Brétigny-sur-Orge Air Base (BA 217) (Note: The June 11, 2017 performance at the Longchamp Racecourse in Paris was part of Download Festival Paris.)	—N/a	—N/a	
June 12, 2017	Esch-sur-Alzette	Luxembourg	Rockhal	—	—	
June 14, 2017	Lucca	Italy	Piazza Napoleone (Note: The June 14, 2017 performance at Piazza Napoleone in Lucca was part of Lucca Summer Festival.)	—N/a	—N/a	
June 15, 2017	Monza	Italy	Autodromo Nazionale di Monza (Note: The June 15, 2017 performance at the Autodromo Nazionale di Monza in Monza was part of I-Days Festival.)	—N/a	—N/a	
June 17, 2017	Nickelsdorf	Austria	Pannonia Fields (Note: The June 17, 2017 performance at the Pannonia Fields in Nickelsdorf was part of Nova Rock Festival.)	—N/a	—N/a	
June 18, 2017	Budapest	Hungary	László Papp Budapest Sports Arena	—	—	
June 21, 2017	Gothenburg	Sweden	Scandinavium	—	—	
June 23, 2017	Scheeßel	Germany	Eichenring (Note: The June 23, 2017 performance at the Eichenring in Scheeßel was part of Hurricane Festival.)	—N/a	—N/a	
June 24, 2017	Tuttlingen	Germany	Neuhausen ob Eck Airfield (Note: The June 24, 2017 performance at Neuhausen ob Eck Airfield in Tuttlingen was part of Southside Festival.)	—N/a	—N/a	
June 28, 2017	Belfast	Northern Ireland	Ormeau Park	—	—	
June 29, 2017	Dublin	Ireland	Royal Hospital Kilmainham	—	—	
July 1, 2017	London	England	Hyde Park (Note: The July 1, 2017 performance at Hyde Park in London was part of British Summer Time Hyde Park.)	—N/a	—N/a	
July 3, 2017	Sheffield	England	Sheffield Arena	—	—	
July 7, 2017	Madrid	Spain	Caja Mágica (Note: The July 7, 2017 performance at the Caja Mágica in Madrid was part of Mad Cool Festival.)	—N/a	—N/a	
August 1, 2017	Auburn	United States	White River Amphitheatre	14,460 / 15,538	$582,001	
August 2, 2017	Portland	United States	Moda Center	11,229 / 13,138	$660,362	
August 5, 2017	Oakland	United States	Oakland–Alameda County Coliseum	25,948 / 37,516	$1,864,545	
August 7, 2017	West Valley City	United States	USANA Amphitheatre	14,391 / 20,000	$461,379	
August 9, 2017	Greenwood Village	United States	Fiddler's Green Amphitheatre	—	—	
August 11, 2017	Kansas City	United States	Sprint Center	10,757 / 12,696	$618,604	
August 12, 2017	Omaha	United States	CenturyLink Center Omaha	9,204 / 15,006	$554,002	
August 14, 2017	Maryland Heights	United States	Hollywood Casino Amphitheatre	12,446 / 18,871	$448,339	
August 16, 2017	Noblesville	United States	Klipsch Music Center	13,191 / 24,373	$517,847	
August 18, 2017	Toronto	Canada	Budweiser Stage	—	—	
August 20, 2017	Cincinnati	United States	Riverbend Music Center	—	—	
August 21, 2017	Cuyahoga Falls	United States	Blossom Music Center	13,428 / 20,917	$587,305	
August 24, 2017	Chicago	United States	Wrigley Field	32,491 / 42,442	$1,901,635	
August 26, 2017	Darien	United States	Darien Lake Performing Arts Center	14,850 / 21,752	$580,963	
August 28, 2017	Mansfield	United States	Xfinity Center	11,922 / 14,265	$778,047	
August 29, 2017	Hartford	United States	Xfinity Theatre	11,378 / 24,511	$472,510	
August 31, 2017	Camden	United States	BB&T Pavilion	21,846 / 25,051	$827,498	
September 1, 2017	Raleigh	United States	Coastal Credit Union Music Park	13,291 / 19,930	$511,658	
September 3, 2017	West Palm Beach	United States	Coral Sky Amphitheatre	18,103 / 19,503	$718,317	
September 5, 2017	Tampa	United States	MidFlorida Credit Union Amphitheatre	12,316 / 18,848	$571,188	
September 6, 2017	Orange Beach	United States	The Wharf Amphitheater	6,068 / 9,784	$301,609	
September 8, 2017	Austin	United States	Austin360 Amphitheater	9,974 / 12,664	$464,864	
September 9, 2017	San Antonio	United States	AT&T Center	8,820 / 12,899	$507,639	
September 11, 2017	Albuquerque	United States	Isleta Amphitheater	9,673 / 15,359	$353,471	
September 13, 2017	Chula Vista	United States	Mattress Firm Amphitheatre	10,561 / 19,463	$502,020	
September 16, 2017	Pasadena	United States	Rose Bowl	36,912 / 44,927	$1,597,843	
September 23, 2017	New York City	United States	Central Park (Note: The September 23, 2017 performance at Central Park in New York City was part of the Global Citizen Festival.)	—N/a	—N/a	
November 1, 2017	Rio de Janeiro	Brazil	Jeunesse Arena	8,194 / 11,000	$543,317	
November 3, 2017	São Paulo	Brazil	Arena Anhembi	22,643 / 29,000	$1,659,260	
November 5, 2017	Curitiba	Brazil	Pedreira Paulo Leminski	12,205 / 16,000	$972,917	
November 7, 2017	Porto Alegre	Brazil	Estádio Beira-Rio	14,000 / 15,400	$836,175	
November 10, 2017	Buenos Aires	Argentina	José Amalfitani Stadium	33,123 / 37,600	$2,209,690	
November 12, 2017	Santiago	Chile	Estadio Bicentenario de La Florida	—	—	
November 14, 2017	Lima	Peru	Estadio Universidad San Marcos	15,457 / 20,000	$915,910	
November 17, 2017	Bogotá	Colombia	Simón Bolívar Park	9,165 / 12,000	$789,642	
November 19, 2017	Mexico City	Mexico	Autódromo Hermanos Rodríguez (Note: The November 19, 2017 performance at the Autódromo Hermanos Rodríguez in Mexico City was part of Corona Capital.)	—N/a	—N/a	
Total				803,936 / 978,938	$46,130,728	–

=== Cancelled tour dates ===
- September 20, 2016 – The Pageant in St. Louis, United States (rescheduled to October 26, 2016)
- September 21, 2016 – Aragon Ballroom in Chicago, United States (rescheduled to October 23, 2016)
- September 23, 2016 – World Cup of Hockey Fan Village in Toronto, Canada (cancelled)
- September 24, 2016 – The Fillmore Detroit in Detroit, United States (rescheduled to October 24, 2016)
- June 21, 2017 – Slottsskogsvallen in Gothenburg, Sweden (venue moved to Scandinavium)
- July 4, 2017 – Bellahouston Park in Glasgow, Scotland (cancelled)
- September 8, 2017 – AT&T Center in San Antonio, United States (rescheduled to September 9, 2017)
- September 9, 2017 – Austin360 Amphitheater in Austin, Texas, United States (rescheduled to September 8, 2017)
- November 15, 2017 – Estadio Nacional in Lima, Peru (venue moved to Estadio Universidad San Marcos)
- November 15, 2017 – Estadio Universidad San Marcos in Lima, Peru (rescheduled to November 14, 2017)

== Personnel ==
Green Day

- Billie Joe Armstrong – lead vocals, guitar, harmonica
- Mike Dirnt – bass, backing vocals
- Tré Cool – drums, percussion, backing vocals on "King For A Day/Shout"

Additional Musicians

- Jason Freese – keyboards, piano, saxophone, accordion, backing vocals
- Jeff Matika – guitar, acoustic guitar, backing vocals
- Jason White – guitar, backing vocals

== Opening acts ==
- Dog Party – all shows during leg one, except those in New York City
- Jesse Malin – Webster Hall show in New York City
- The Interrupters – all shows during leg three, leg five, and leg eight
- Against Me! – all shows during leg four
- Rancid – all shows during leg six
- Catfish and the Bottlemen – all shows during leg seven, except New York City show

== Promotional performances ==
In addition to tour dates, the band made promotional performances, including ones that were broadcast on radio, television, and the Internet.

- October 5, 2016 – The Howard Stern Show at Sirius XM Radio in New York City, United States
- October 6, 2016 – The Tonight Show Starring Jimmy Fallon at NBC Studios in New York City, United States
- October 14, 2016 – AT&T Live at the iHeartRadio Theater Los Angeles in Burbank, California, United States
- October 19, 2016 – Red Bull Sound Space at KROQ-FM in Los Angeles, United States
- November 6, 2016 – MTV Europe Music Awards at Rotterdam Ahoy in Rotterdam, the Netherlands
- November 20, 2016 – American Music Awards at the Microsoft Theater in Los Angeles, United States
- November 21, 2016 – Jimmy Kimmel Live! at the El Capitan Entertainment Centre in Los Angeles, United States
- November 22, 2016 – The Late Late Show with James Corden at CBS Television City in Los Angeles, United States
- December 13, 2016 – The Ellen DeGeneres Show at Warner Bros. Studios in Burbank, California, United States
- March 16, 2017 – The Late Show with Stephen Colbert at the Ed Sullivan Theater in New York City, United States
- May 19, 2017 – Good Morning America at the Summer Concert Series at Rumsey Playfield in New York City, United States
- September 5, 2017 – AmeriCares benefit live stream at the backstage of the MidFlorida Credit Union Amphitheatre in Tampa, Florida, United States
