= Father of All Motherfuckers =

2020 studio album by Green Day

- Standard edition cover (Note: The limited edition uses the same artwork, but lacks the unicorn, uncensoring the word "motherfuckers".)

Studio album by Green Day
- Released: February 7, 2020
- Recorded: June–September 2019
- Studios: RubyRed (Santa Monica); Armstrong's Home Studio (Oakland)
- Genres: Garage rock; alternative rock; garage punk; pop rock; pop-punk
- Length: 26:12
- Label: Reprise
- Producers: Butch Walker; Green Day; Chris Dugan

Green Day chronology
Woodstock 1994 (2019)	Father of All Motherfuckers (2020)	BBC Sessions (2021)

Green Day studio chronology
Revolution Radio (2016)	Father of All Motherfuckers (2020)	Saviors (2024)

Singles from Father of All Motherfuckers
- 1. "Father of All..." Released: September 10, 2019; 2. "Fire, Ready, Aim" Released: October 9, 2019; 3. "Oh Yeah!" Released: January 16, 2020

Father of All Motherfuckers (Note: Censored as Father of All… and Father of All M***********s) is the thirteenth studio album by the American rock band Green Day, released on February 7, 2020, through Reprise Records. Produced by Butch Walker, the band, and Chris Dugan, the album marks a complete departure from the band's traditional punk rock sound, incorporating garage rock elements similar to their tenth studio album, ¡Dos! (2012).

The album was preceded by three singles: "Father of All...", "Fire, Ready, Aim" and "Oh Yeah!". It debuted atop the UK Albums Chart and Australian ARIA Albums Chart, among others. Despite chart success, the album received polarized reviews from critics, with praise for the album's brisk pace and energy, but criticism for its lyrics and runtime.

== Background ==
On December 9, 2018, lead vocalist Billie Joe Armstrong revealed that he was writing new songs for an upcoming Green Day album. As recording sessions for the album took place, the band had recorded sixteen songs. However, the band found it difficult to string together all 16 tracks, so they narrowed it down to the ten tracks they felt were the best to make the final cut.

According to Armstrong, the band wanted to make a "sort of old-timey rock 'n' roll record that traces the history of rock 'n' roll". He stated that the album was inspired by glam rock acts such as "T. Rex or Mott the Hoople, to Martha and the Vandellas, and also some garage rock". "'Father of All...' feels like it's somewhere in between Prince and MC5", Armstrong said.

== Composition ==
According to lead vocalist Billie Joe Armstrong, the album is "The New! Soul, Motown, glam and manic anthemic. Punks, freaks and punishers!" He would also state that the lyrics are about "the life AND death of the party" and the "lifestyle of not giving a fuck". Writers have described the sound of Father of All Motherfuckers as garage rock, alternative rock, garage punk, pop rock, and pop punk. With a running time of 26 minutes and 12 seconds, it is Green Day's shortest album to date.

=== Packaging ===
The cover features a repurposed version of the cover art from their 2004 album, American Idiot. Armstrong wrote the full album title on the arm, but obscured the word "motherfuckers" with a drawing of a unicorn. The limited-edition version of the album uses an uncensored version that lacks the unicorn.

== Singles and promotion ==
The album's lead single and title track, "Father of All...", was released on September 10, 2019. A music video was released on September 19. "Fire, Ready, Aim", was released on October 9 as the official opening theme song for the National Hockey League and NBCSN's Wednesday Night Hockey television broadcasts and as the album's second single. NBCSN also uses "Father of All...", usually during highlights from previous games for the two teams playing on Wednesday Night Hockey.

The album's third single, "Oh Yeah!", was released on January 16, 2020, along with a music video. The song takes its title and samples the chorus from Joan Jett's cover of "Do You Wanna Touch Me", originally sung by Gary Glitter. Acknowledging the latter's sexual abuse history and multiple convictions, the band mentioned they would donate their royalties from the sales of "Oh Yeah!" to International Justice Mission and Rape, Abuse & Incest National Network. The song was used as one of the official theme songs for the 2020 edition of the WWE PPV, Backlash.

At the same time as the album's release on digital platforms, a music video for the song "Meet Me on the Roof" was released, featuring Gaten Matarazzo as a guest star.

To promote the album, the band announced the Hella Mega Tour with Fall Out Boy and Weezer. Initially planned for March 2020, the tour began on July 24, 2021, following the cancellation of shows in Asia and Oceania, and delays to the North American and European dates due to the ongoing COVID-19 pandemic.

== Critical reception ==
Professional ratings
Aggregate scores
Source	Rating
AnyDecentMusic?	5.9/10
Metacritic	68/100
Review scores
Source	Rating
AllMusic	3.5/5 stars
Clash	7/10
DIY	3/5 stars
Entertainment Weekly	C−
The Independent	2/5 stars
Kerrang!	4/5 stars
Pitchfork	6.7/10
PopMatters	5/10
Rolling Stone	4/5 stars
The Telegraph	4/5 stars

Father of All Motherfuckers received polarizing but mostly positive reviews from music critics. At Metacritic, which assigns a normalized rating out of 100 to reviews from mainstream critics, the album has an average critic score of 68 out of 100, which indicates "generally favorable reviews" based on 25 reviews. In 2022, Loudwire published that Father of All Motherfuckers was the highest-ranked rock album on a list of the worst albums of the 21st century, based on the Metacritic user score of 4.8 out of 10 and a study of the harshness of language used in negative and mixed critical reviews.

Kerrang! magazine rated the album four out of five stars, saying, "Father of All Motherfuckers is just another sign of a band who have always done things their way refusing to do what's expected of them. And it's a hella mega good time from start to finish". Reviewing for Rolling Stone, critic Jon Dolan also gave the album four out of five stars, naming it one of Green Day's most fun albums, and writing, "Father of All... is a bountiful act of recovered rock memory, an effortlessly affirming argument that the first mosh pit or car radio contact high you get when you’re 13 years old can be enough to sustain you long into life."

Comparing it to their previous work, Q magazine said, "By its very nature, Father of All... is slight compared to a sprawling magnum opus such as 2009's 21st Century Breakdown, but it's close to impossible to emerge from its rapid-fire near-half-hour without a smile on your face." Conversely, Entertainment Weekly gave the album a middling "C−", saying, "At its best, [Father of All] might be the dance party we need, but it's not the one we want."

However, several critics described Father of All... as among the worst Green Day has produced; Sputnikmusic gave the album a 1.5 out of 5 rating, calling the album "a hot mess that destroys any hope that Green Day could re-emerge as a band worth listening to." Ross Horton of musicOMH awarded it one out of five stars, calling it a "disaster", criticizing the use of the Glitter sample, and stating the band "become the very thing they once despised: buck-chasin' mild boys of mayonnaise corporate rock".

== Commercial performance ==
Father of All Motherfuckers debuted at number four on the US Billboard 200 with 48,000 album-equivalent units, including 42,000 pure album sales. It is Green Day's 11th US top-10 album.

== Track listing ==
All lyrics are written by Billie Joe Armstrong; all music is composed by Billie Joe Armstrong, Mike Dirnt, and Tré Cool.

Track listing for Father of All Motherfuckers
No.	Title	Length
1.	"Father of All..."	2:31
2.	"Fire, Ready, Aim"	1:52
3.	"Oh Yeah!"	2:51
4.	"Meet Me on the Roof"	2:39
5.	"I Was a Teenage Teenager"	3:44
6.	"Stab You in the Heart"	2:10
7.	"Sugar Youth"	1:54
8.	"Junkies on a High"	3:06
9.	"Take the Money and Crawl"	2:08
10.	"Graffitia"	3:17
Total length:		26:12

Japanese edition bonus track
No.	Title	Length
11.	"Bang Bang" (live from the Whisky)	3:52
Total length:		30:09

Notes

- "Oh Yeah!" contains an excerpt of "Do You Wanna Touch Me (Oh Yeah)", written by Gary Glitter and Mike Leander, performed by Joan Jett and the Blackhearts.

== Live at The Whisky EP ==
Live at The Whisky

EP by Green Day
- Released: February 21, 2020
- Recorded: September 10, 2019
- Genres: Garage rock; alternative rock; garage punk; pop rock; pop-punk
- Length: 6:54
- Label: Reprise

Green Day chronology
Woodstock 1994 (2019)	Live at The Whisky (2020)	BBC Sessions (2021)

To promote the release of the album, Green Day announced on September 10, 2019, during the Kevin and Bean show at KROQ that they would hold a surprise performance at the Whisky a Go Go that night. Songs from the performance were recorded and released on a 7" vinyl record on February 21, 2020. The EP was recorded, mixed, and mastered by Chris Dugan.

Track listing for Live at The Whisky
No.	Title	Length
1.	"Father of All"	2:43
2.	"American Idiot"	4:11
Total length:		6:54

== Personnel ==
Personnel taken from Father of All Motherfuckers liner notes, except where noted.

Green Day

- Billie Joe Armstrong – vocals, guitar, production, design
- Mike Dirnt – bass, production
- Tré Cool – drums, percussion, production

Additional musician

- Butch Walker – keyboards, backing vocals

Production

- Butch Walker – production, engineering
- Chris Dugan – production on "Father of All...", mixing on "Sugar Youth", engineering
- Todd Stopera – assistant engineering
- Tchad Blake – mixing (all except "Sugar Youth")
- Elin B. – mixing assistant (all except "Sugar Youth")
- Brian Lucey – mastering
- Nathaniel Mela – drum tech
- Andrew Hans Buscher – guitar tech

Artwork

- Chris Bilheimer – design
- Pamela Littky – photography

== Charts ==
=== Weekly charts ===
Weekly chart performance for Father of All Motherfuckers
Chart (2020)	Peak position
Australian Albums (ARIA)	1
Austrian Albums (Ö3 Austria)	2
Belgian Albums (Ultratop Flanders)	11
Belgian Albums (Ultratop Wallonia)	7
Canadian Albums (Billboard)	6
Czech Albums (ČNS IFPI)	59
Dutch Albums (Album Top 100)	15
Estonian Albums (Eesti Tipp-40)	31
Finnish Albums (Suomen virallinen lista)	14
French Albums (SNEP)	34
German Albums (Offizielle Top 100)	2
Hungarian Albums (MAHASZ)	2
Irish Albums (Official Charts)	4
Italian Albums (FIMI)	9
Japanese Albums (Oricon)	9
New Zealand Albums (RMNZ)	5
Norwegian Albums (VG-lista)	12
Polish Albums (ZPAV)	28
Portuguese Albums (AFP)	3
Scottish Albums (Official Charts)	1
Slovak Albums (ČNS IFPI)	35
Spanish Albums (Promusicae)	7
Swedish Albums (Sverigetopplistan)	19
Swiss Albums (Schweizer Hitparade)	1
UK Albums (Official Charts)	1
UK Rock & Metal Albums (OCC)	1
US Billboard 200	4
US Top Rock Albums (Billboard)	1

=== Year-end charts ===
Year-end chart performance for Father of All Motherfuckers
Chart (2020)	Position
Hungarian Albums (MAHASZ)	38
US Top Rock Albums (Billboard)	66
