= Oh Yeah! (Green Day song) =

Single by Green Day

from the album Father of All Motherfuckers
- Released: January 16, 2020
- Recorded: Summer 2019
- Genre: Pop rock; power pop; glam rock; synth-pop
- Length: 2:51
- Label: Reprise
- Songwriters: Billie Joe Armstrong; Tré Cool; Mike Dirnt; Gary Glitter; Mike Leander
- Producers: Butch Walker; Green Day

Green Day singles chronology
"Fire, Ready, Aim" (2019)	"Oh Yeah!" (2020)	"Dreaming" (2020)

Music video
- "Oh Yeah!" on YouTube

"Oh Yeah!" is a song recorded by American rock band Green Day for their thirteenth studio album, Father of All Motherfuckers (2020). Band members Billie Joe Armstrong, Tré Cool, and Mike Dirnt all co-wrote the song, which samples Joan Jett's cover of "Do You Wanna Touch Me (Oh Yeah)". "Oh Yeah!" was released on January 16, 2020, through Reprise Records as the album's third single. It later made its radio debut on January 28, 2020.

The song was the official theme song of the WWE pay-per-view (now "Premium Live Event") event Backlash (2020).

== Background and composition ==
"Oh Yeah!" was originally titled "Bulletproof Backpack" but was re-titled at some point in the production process to more closely associate it with "Do You Wanna Touch Me", which the song samples Joan Jett's version in its chorus. This represents the first time the band has sampled another artist's work. The writers of "Do You Wanna Touch Me", Gary Glitter and Mike Leander, both receive writing credits on the track. The band described Glitter as a "total asshole" because of his sexual abuse convictions and pledged to donate their royalties from the track to International Justice Mission and Rape, Abuse & Incest National Network. The lyrics of "Oh Yeah!" address celebrity culture and the polarization of modern society.

The song has been described as pop rock by The Daily Californian, power pop by Ultimate Classic Rock, glam rock by the Associated Press, and synth-pop by Louder Sound.

== Commercial performance ==
The song topped the Billboard Alternative Songs Chart at the week ending of April 18, 2020. This broke the record previously held by Red Hot Chili Peppers for the longest span of Alternative Songs chart toppers, as "Longview" became their first chart topper in June 1994.

== Music video ==
An accompanying music video directed by Malia James premiered January 16, 2020. The clip opens with drummer Tré Cool filming a tutorial on how to play the song. A driver is shown watching this video as the camera zooms out from the tutorial and promptly hits lead singer Billie Joe Armstrong in a grocery store parking lot as a result. This incident is filmed by a fan nearby and goes viral. While Armstrong shows up on multiple occasions throughout the video, Mike Dirnt and Tré Cool have recurring appearances as a security guard (who recognizes Armstrong) and a news reporter, respectively. Throughout the rest of the video, various people take selfies and are otherwise absorbed by their phones. Celebrity status and social media obsession are two themes in the video identified by critics.

== Charts ==
=== Weekly charts ===
Chart (2020)	Peak position
Canada Rock (Billboard)	1
Czech Republic (Top 20 Modern Rock)	3
UK Rock & Metal (Official Charts)	19
US Hot Rock & Alternative Songs (Billboard)	3
US Rock & Alternative Airplay (Billboard)	1

=== Year-end charts ===
Chart (2020)	Position
US Hot Rock & Alternative Songs (Billboard)	48
US Rock Airplay (Billboard)	11

== Release history ==
Country	Date	Format	Label	Ref.
Various	January 16, 2020	Digital download; streaming	Reprise	
United States	January 28, 2020	Active rock	Warner	
United States	January 28, 2020	Modern rock	Warner	
