= Hellfest =

Annual heavy metal music festival in Clisson, France

Coordinates: 47°05′45″N 1°16′05″W

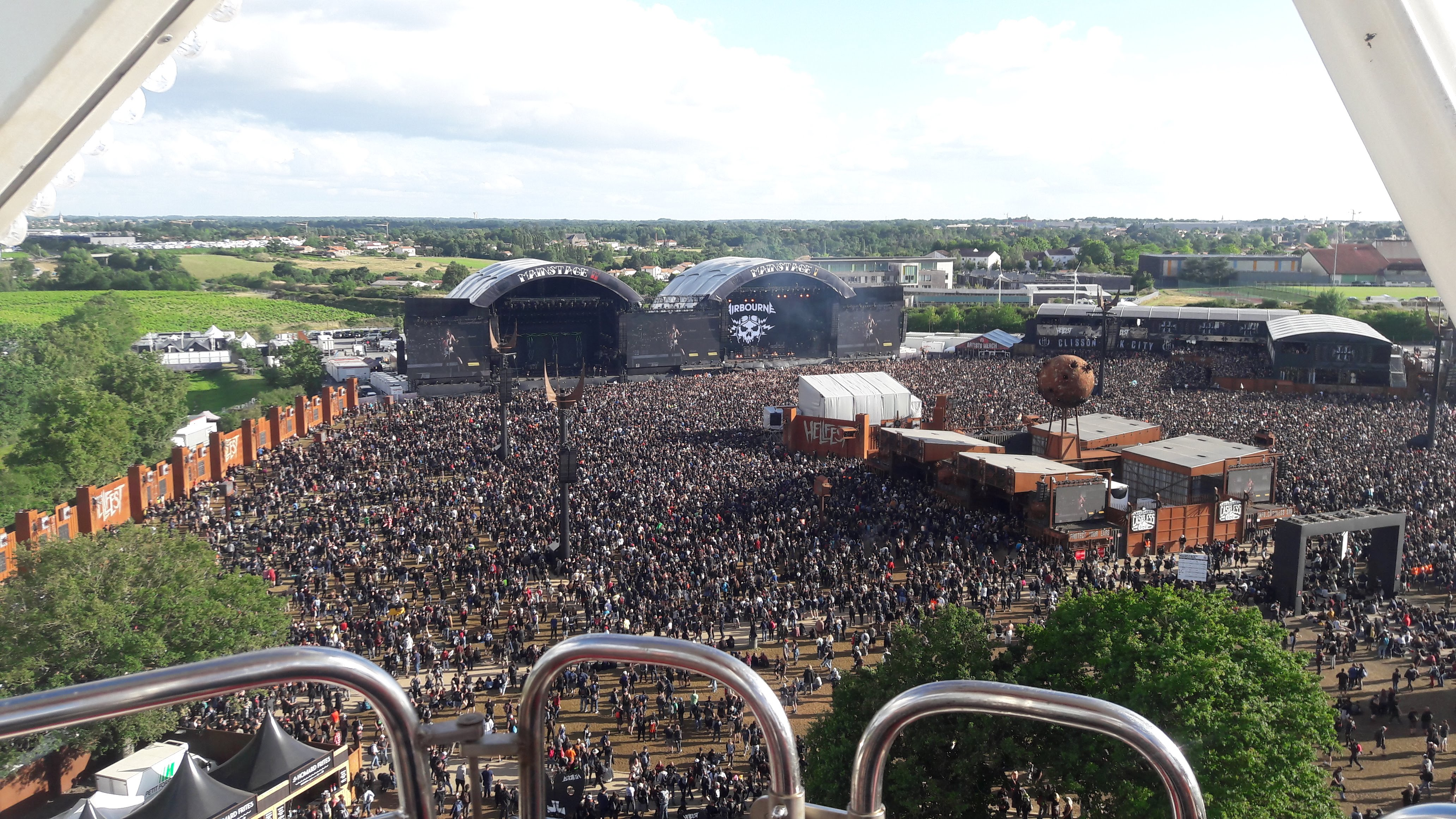
- Hellfest 2022
- Genre: Heavy metal; extreme metal; hard rock
- Dates: Mid-June
- Locations: Clisson, Loire-Atlantique, France
- Years active: 2006–present
- Founders: Ben Barbaud and Yoann Le Nevé
- Attendance: 420,000 (2022)
- Capacity: 70,000
- Website: hellfest.fr

Hellfest (French pronunciation: [ɛlfɛst]), also known as Hellfest Summer Open Air, is a rock festival focusing on heavy metal music, held annually in June in Clisson, France. Its high attendance makes it the French music festival with the largest turnover. It is also one of the biggest metal festivals in Europe and the biggest to exist in France. It has been referred to as "the most diverse extreme metal festival in the world," and is a favorite of many musicians to perform at.

It originated at another music festival, the Fury Fest, held from 2002 to 2005, in different areas of Pays de la Loire. Hellfest took over in 2006 and has seen a continuous rise in visitors over the years, from 22,000 in the first edition to 55,000 tickets sold per day in 2017. In 2022, the seven-day festival featured 350 bands and was attended by 60,000 people per day.

Its programming is primarily focused on hard rock and metal on the two main stages, while each of the four other festival's stages are dedicated to more extreme metal, making the presence of a wide variety of groups possible.

== Overview ==
Hellfest succeeded Fury Fest, held in 2002 and 2003 in Clisson and Nantes, respectively, and in 2004 and 2005 in Le Mans.

It is unrelated to the hardcore festival Hellfest, which ran in Syracuse, New York, in the United States from 1997 to 2005 or the Drakkar Productions black metal festival named "Drakkar Hellfest - Darkness and Hate", which took place in 2000 and 2001 in southern France and saw a third edition in 2002 in the Netherlands.

In June 2009, conservative groups expressed concern about the festival's name and asked its sponsors to withdraw support. Coca-Cola announced a few days later that they would no longer support the festival.

In March 2010, two days before local elections, Prime Minister François Fillon and the leader of the conservative MPF Philippe de Villiers came to support Christophe Béchu, candidate for the regional elections of the Pays de la Loire for the then main French right-wing party UMP. In front of 1,500 people, Mr De Villiers reiterated his support for the candidate and attacked the metal music festival: "Our values are not like those of the Regional Council (PS); to be funding a satanic festival!". The same month, former minister and leader of the conservative Parti chrétien-démocrate Christine Boutin wrote to major brewery Kronenbourg asking them to stop supporting the festival.

On 30 March, answering a question from PS Member of Parliament Patrick Roy during a "questions to the government" session, then minister of culture Frédéric Mitterrand declared to the Assemblée Nationale that detractors of the festival should calm down.

On 9 June 2010, the AFC (Associations Familiales Catholiques) sued Hellfest, asking the team not to allow people under 18 years old to attend the festival and to give them the titles of the songs to be played during the 2010 edition. On 14 June, the judge refused their demand.

During the 2011 edition of the festival, homage was paid to Patrick Roy, who had died two months earlier.

== History ==
=== Early years ===
The first association was created in 2000 in Clisson as "CLS CREW" to organise hardcore and punk concerts in the Nantes region. The success of these concerts made it possible to launch the first festival in June 2002, named Fury Fest. It drew 400 people to see Agnostic Front in Clisson at the Val-de-Moine sports complex.

The festival continued in the following years. In 2003, it drew 7,000 people to attend concerts by Sick of It All and Youth of Today. The format changed to two days. Because no room was available in Clisson, the Hall of Trocardière (Rezé) hosted the second edition. The festival's organisation also changed: the "MAN.IN.FEST" association was created to take charge. In 2003, the festival had reached €30,000 in profit, allowing Benjamin Barbaud, one of the founders, to become an employee of the structure. In 2004, the festival moved to Le Mans and took place in the halls of the 24 Hours circuit where it attracted 21,000 spectators for bands such as Slipknot and Soulfly.

After a deficit in 2004, the 2005 festival inherited liabilities, so the organising team decided to give the festival's rights to other promoters to focus on organisation. This time 30,000 admissions were recorded at Le Mans over three days, as fans came to see acts such as Slayer, Motörhead and Anthrax, across three stages. But financial problems worsened, particularly after the promoters disappeared with €600,000 in receipts. These losses marked the festival's end, at least temporarily.

Pictures of the 2017 edition

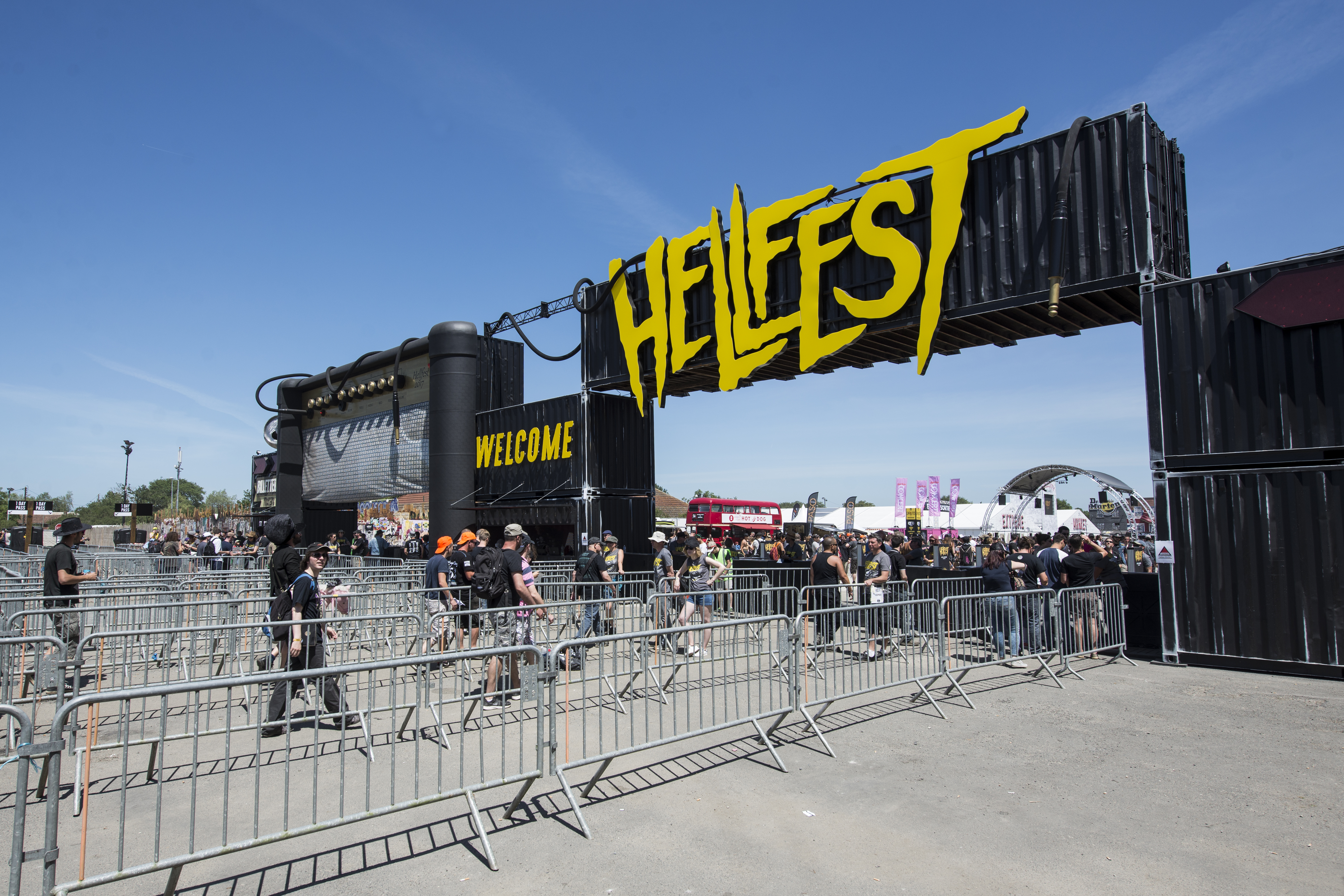
First entrance portal

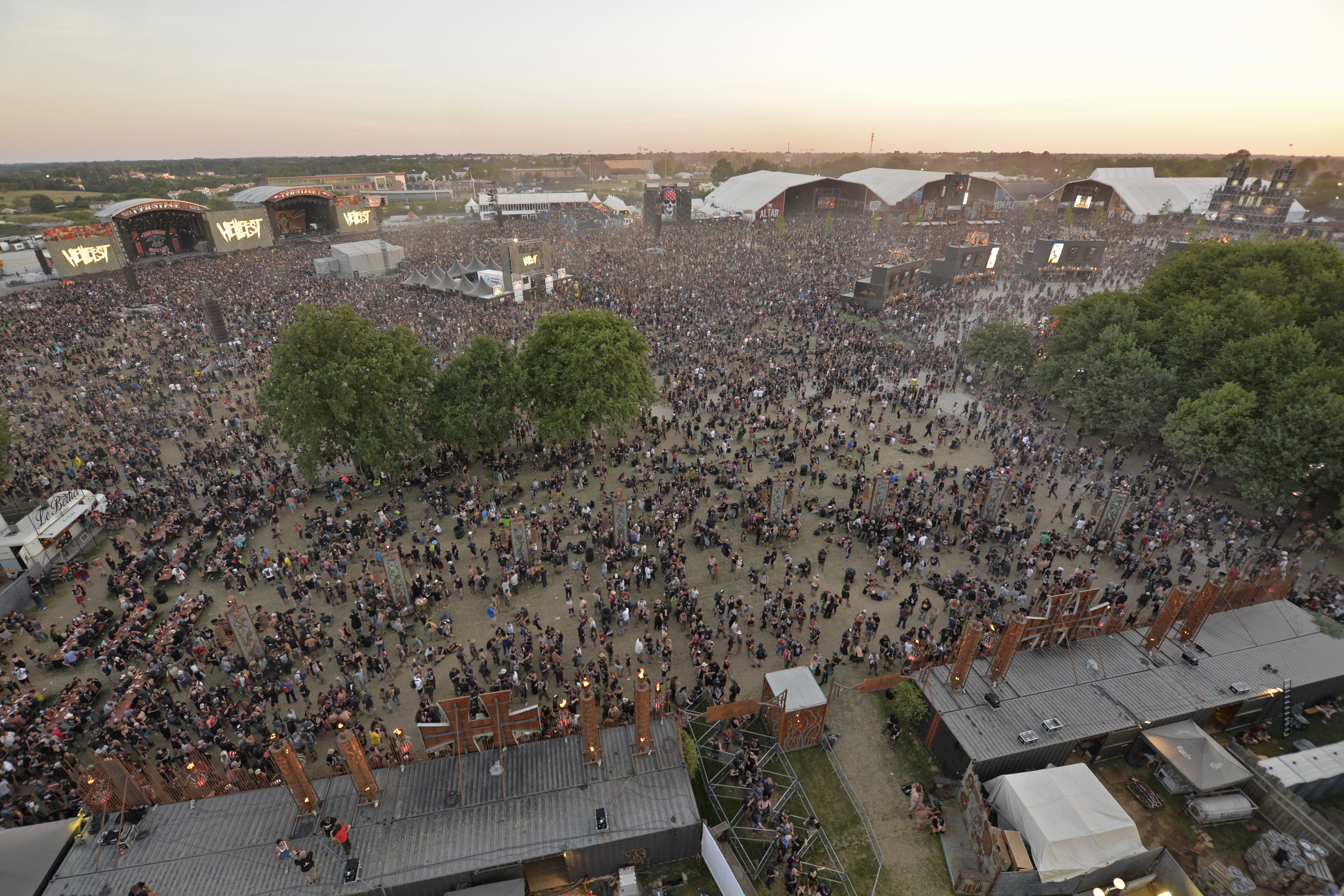
Overview

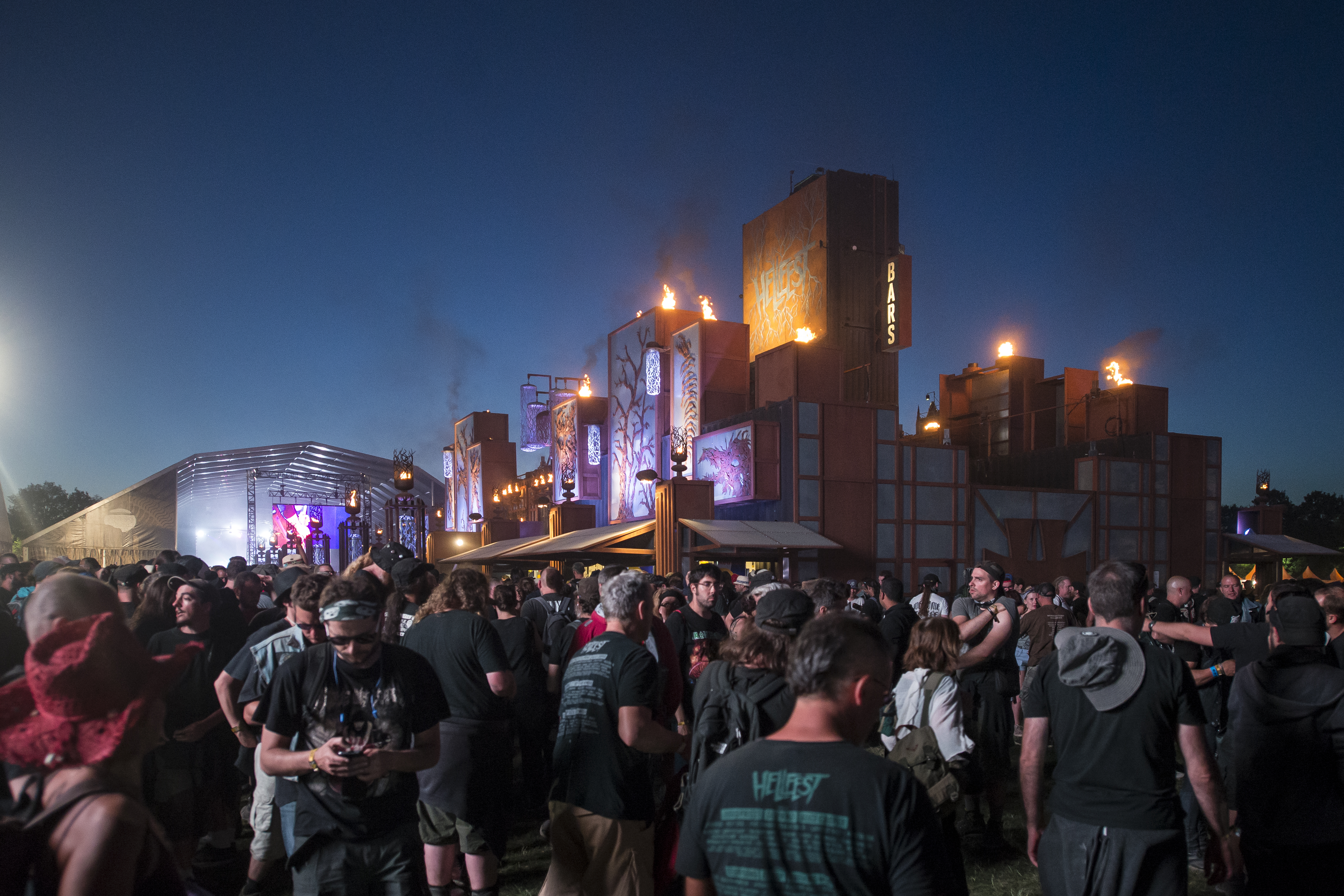
At night

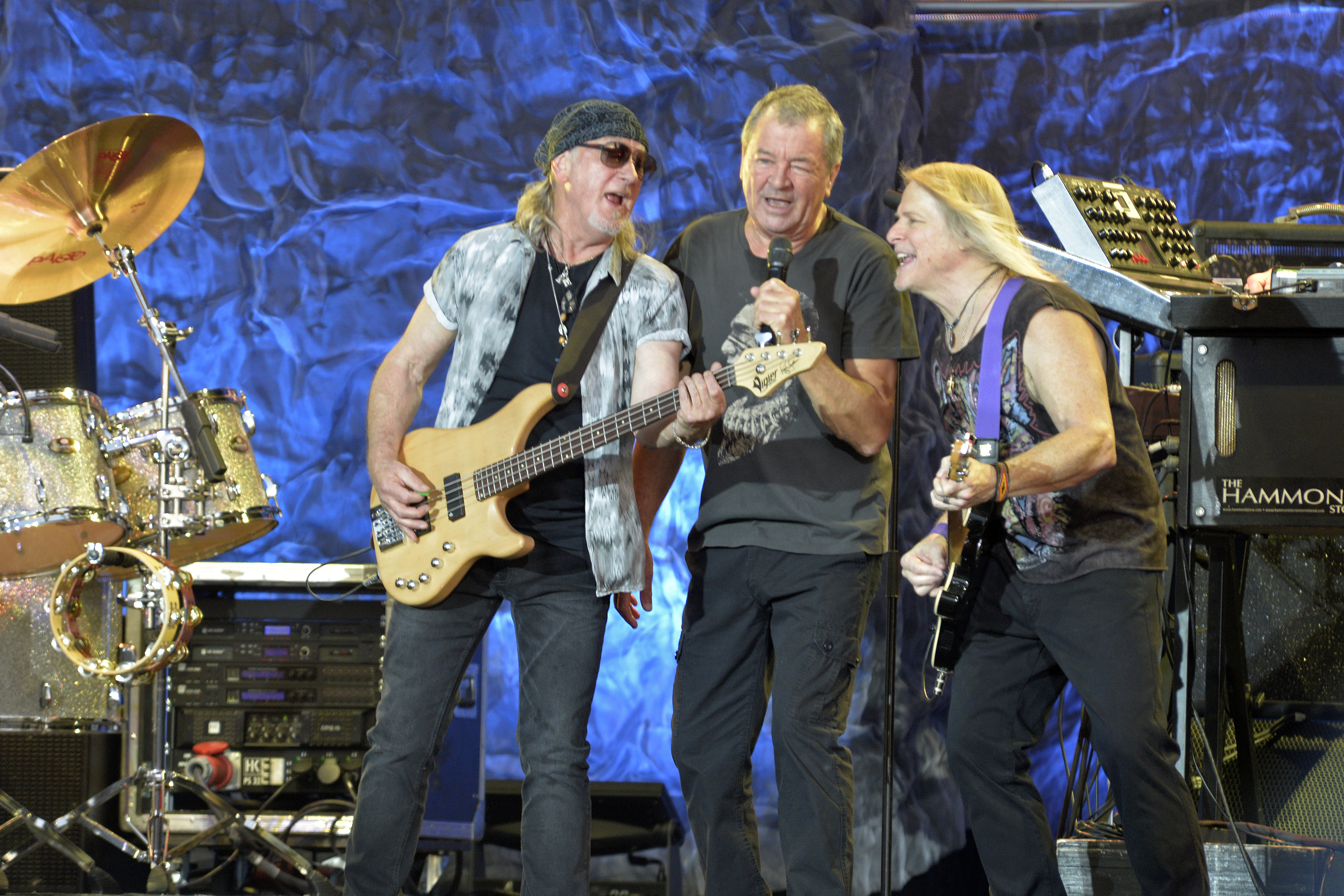
Deep Purple concert

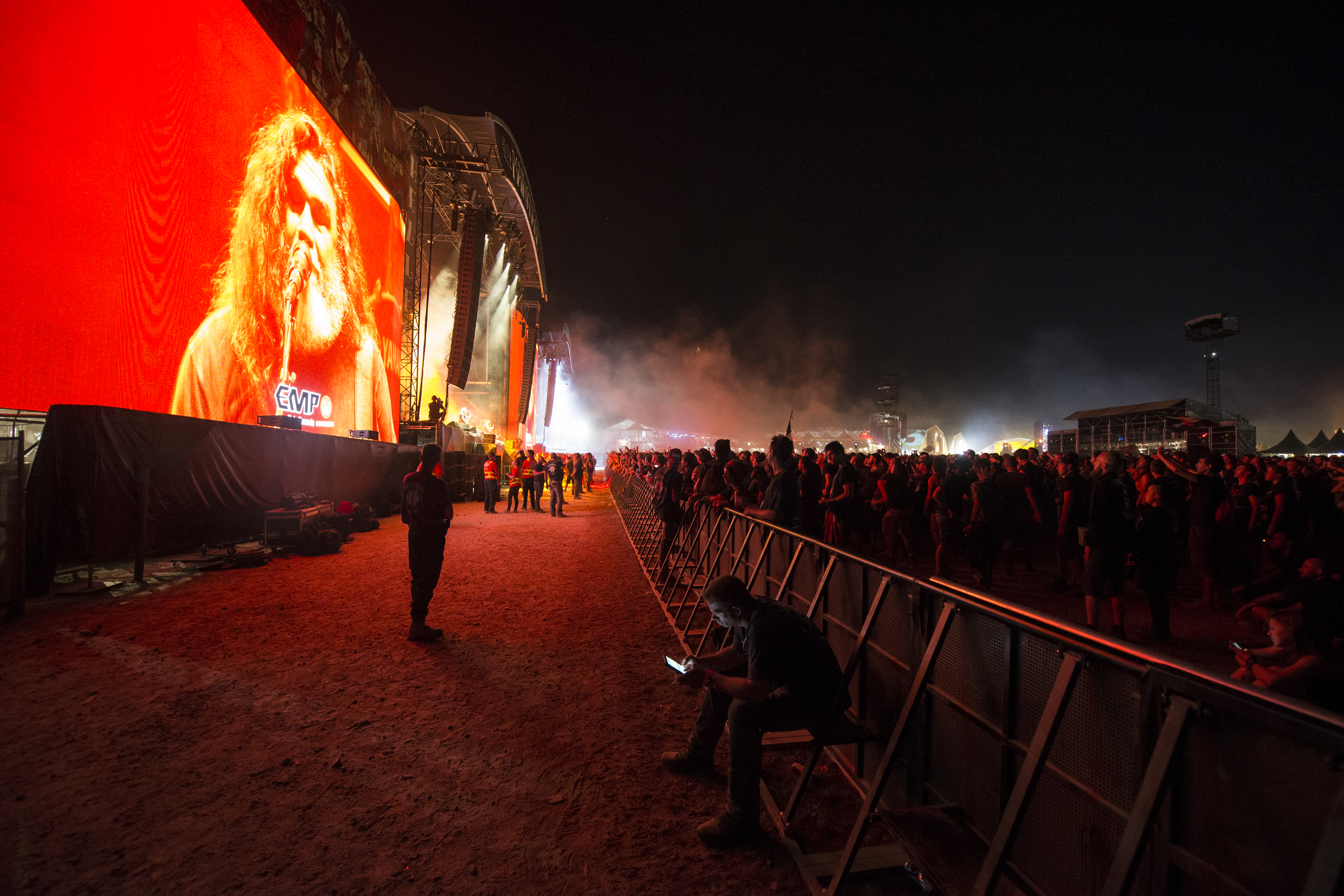
Slayer concert

=== Cancellations for 2020 and 2021 editions ===
On 8 April 2020, Benjamin Barbaud announced to Ouest-France that the 2020 edition of the festival would be cancelled due to the ongoing COVID-19 pandemic. The festival organisation announced on 9 April 2020 that they paid on 17 December 2019 to Albingia, their insurance company, €175,000 for cancellation risks, including pandemic risks, but that the company refused to pay for the cancellation. The contract was sold before the development of the pandemic in China. It was reported that representatives from Albingia were claiming that the contract did not cover the pandemic because "respiratory diseases were excluded from the contract". On the day after its cancellation, it was announced that Hellfest was rescheduled to 18–20 June 2021.

On 19 February 2021, it was announced that Hellfest had once again been cancelled, due to "uncertainties about the health situation and the latest government regulations", and would be rescheduled to 2022.

Pictures of the 2022 edition

Entrance

Square

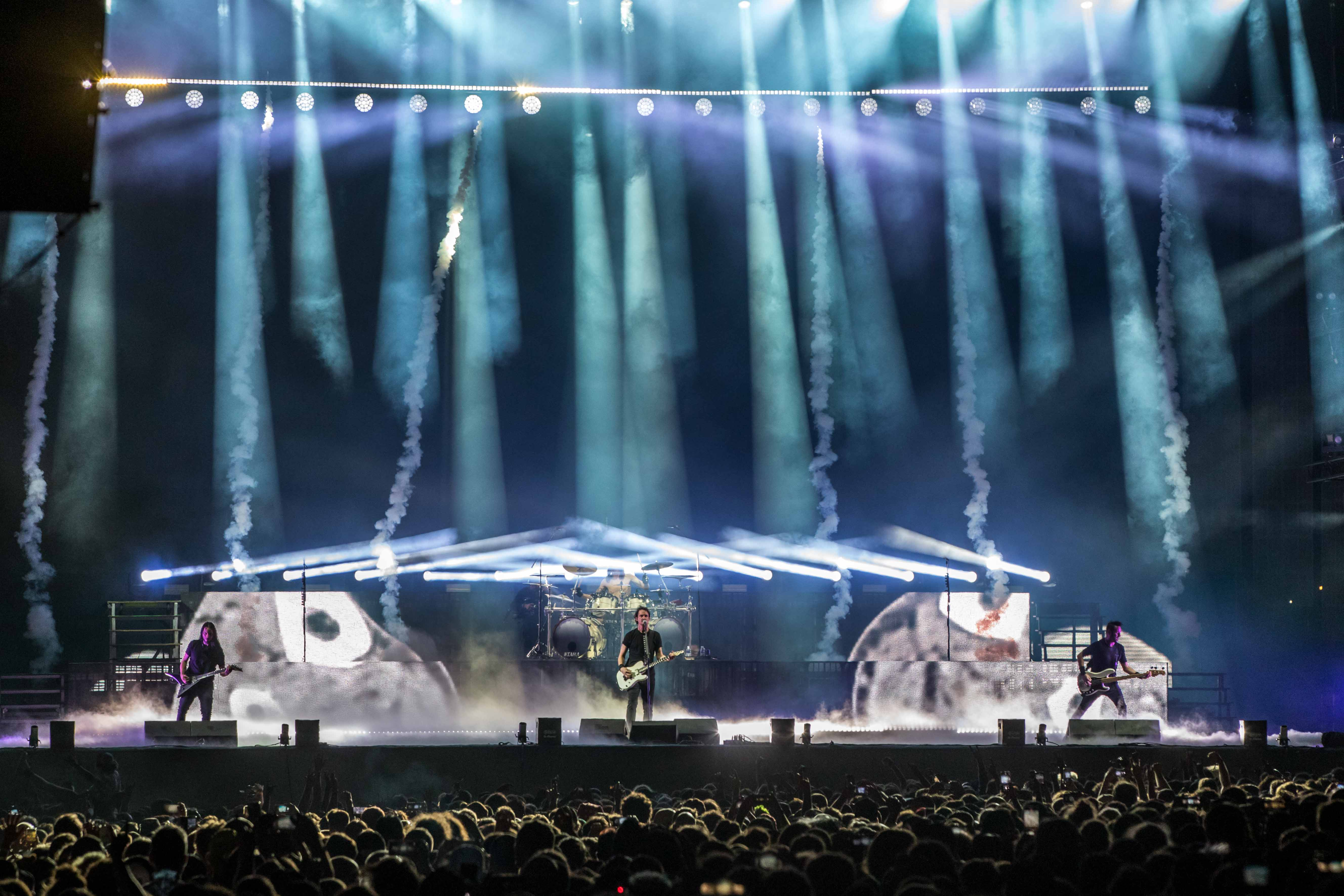
Gojira concert, Mainstage 1

Hangman's Chair concert, Valley stage

=== Twentieth anniversary ===
For its twentieth anniversary in 2027, the festival will expand from six to ten stages and feature 300 bands (up from 180 in 2026), while maintaining its capacity of 70,000 people per day.
