= Alternative music (disambiguation) =

Alternative music is another term for alternative rock, a category of rock music that evolved from independent music underground of the 1970s.

Alternative music may also refer to:

- Alternative country
- Alternative dance
- Alternative hip-hop
- Alternative metal
- Alternative pop
- Alternative R&B
- Alternative reggaeton
- Christian alternative rock
- Independent music
- Indie folk, sometimes referred to as alternative folk
- Neo soul, sometimes referred to as alternative soul
