= Woodstock 1994 (Green Day album) =

Live album by Green Day
- Released: April 13, 2019
- Recorded: August 14, 1994
- Venue: Winston Farm, Saugerties, New York
- Genre: Punk rock
- Length: 38:59
- Label: Reprise
- Producer: Chris Dugan; Green Day

Green Day chronology
| Greatest Hits: God's Favorite Band (2017) | Woodstock 1994 (2019) | Father of All Motherfuckers (2020) |

Professional ratings
Review scores
| Source | Rating |
|---|---|
| AllMusic | 3.5/5 stars |

Woodstock 1994 is a live album by the American rock band Green Day. The album was released specially through Record Store Day on April 13, 2019, in honor of the 50th anniversary of Woodstock and the 25th anniversary of the now-famous set the band played at Woodstock '94. This was the first live Green Day album to feature the entire setlist. On August 17, 2023, Green Day announced that the album would make a reappearance on vinyl and first time on CD as part of Dookie's 30th anniversary deluxe reissue.

== Background ==
Green Day played the Woodstock festival on the South Stage on August 14, 1994, six months after their first major-label album, Dookie, was released. The performance was one of the most memorable of the festival, with the band getting involved in a mud fight with their fans. Tré Cool said of the event: "It was a crazy set – a set that changed our whole lives."

Prior to the announcement of the reissue, the live performance had been passed around through bootlegs and video recordings.

On March 1, 2019, the band announced on their Instagram, "Look at that! Woodstock 1994 Live (remixed + remastered) drops on vinyl for the first time ever this Record Store Day. No better way to celebrate 50 years of Woodstock and the 25th anniversary of when we got a little muddy."

== Album cover ==
The album cover was created by Billie Joe Armstrong. The cover photo features the same image from the band's 1994 album Dookie, but with duct tape over the cover, splattered with mud and written on. The band name on top of the mushroom cloud is covered by a piece of duct tape with "Green Day Live!" written on it, the monkey on the bottom left is wearing sunglasses, four of the missiles are saying "Never Trust a Hippy" and the word "Dookie" is covered by another piece of duct tape, with "Woodstock 1994" written on it.

== Notes on performance ==
Woodstock '94 has also been referred to as Mudstock, or Mudstock '94, partly due to the rainy weather that resulted in mud pits; the band Nine Inch Nails performed covered in mud, and the crowd threw mud onto the stage when Primus performed "My Name Is Mud". During Green Day's performance, the crowd also started to pelt the stage with mud, some of which hit guitarist and lead vocalist Billie Joe Armstrong. Armstrong then started a mud fight during their song "Paper Lanterns" with the crowd. Bassist Mike Dirnt was mistaken for one of the fans jumping on stage and was spear-tackled by a security guard, knocking out one of his teeth. It was this incident that caused Dirnt to need emergency orthodontia. A gag order was put in place regarding this incident. In spite of the now-famous mud-fight and Dirnt's injury, Woodstock quickly propelled Green Day's then-recently released album, Dookie, into success.

== Track listing ==
All lyrics written by Billie Joe Armstrong; all music composed by Green Day.

Side A
| No. | Title | Length |
|---|---|---|
| 1. | "Welcome to Paradise" | 5:14 |
| 2. | "One of My Lies" | 3:05 |
| 3. | "Chump" | 2:34 |
| 4. | "Longview" | 3:37 |
| 5. | "Basket Case" | 3:13 |

Side B
| No. | Title | Length |
|---|---|---|
| 1. | "When I Come Around" | 2:45 |
| 2. | "Burnout" | 2:54 |
| 3. | "F.O.D." | 2:41 |
| 4. | "Paper Lanterns" | 8:09 |
| 5. | "Shit Show" | 5:54 |
| Total length: | | 38:59 |

== Personnel ==
Green Day

- Billie Joe Armstrong – guitar, lead vocals
- Mike Dirnt – bass guitar, backing vocals
- Tré Cool – drums

Production

- Green Day – producer
- Chris Dugan – producer

== Charts ==
| Chart (2019) | Peak position |
|---|---|
| US Billboard 200 | 156 |
| US Top Rock Albums (Billboard) | 28 |
