= Albingia =

French insurance company

- Industry: Insurance
- Founded: 1901
- Headquarters: Levallois-Perret, France
- Area served: France
- Key people: Bruno Chamoin (Chairman) (since 2003)
- Revenue: €229 million (2017)
- Net income: €47 million (2018)
- Number of employees: 250 (2017)

Albingia is a French insurance company specializing in risk management, based in Levallois-Perret.

Albingia is currently the only independent French insurance company specialized in Risk management.

== History ==
Albingia was founded in 1901 in Hamburg. its first French subsidiary opens in 1962. In 1999 Albingia was sold to Axa for €850 million. In 2003, Albingia France was bought by Barclays Private Equity (now Equistone Partners Europe) then sold again in 2006 to Chevrillon & Associés et IDI.

In 2018, Eurazeo bought shares of Albingia, alongside the Financière de Blacailloux, controlled by Bruno Chamoin, also Chairman of Albingia.

On 9 April 2020, The Hellfest festival organization announced that they paid on 17 December 2019 to Albingia €175000 for cancellation risks, including pandemic risks, but that the company refused to pay for the cancellation of the festival. The contract was sold before the apparition of the COVID-19 pandemic in China.

== Activity ==
In 1962, the first risk management sold by Albingia was linked for machinery breakdown risks. Since that time its activity has expanded to other risks. It has approximately 3500 Insurance brokers.

== COVID-19 claims ==
In 2020, in regards to the COVID-19 pandemic, the company has decided to not cover for damages suffered by the client that runs the Hellfest music festival. As reported Hellfest's insurance policy covered pandemics. It was also reported that representatives from Albingia agreed, however they claimed it did not cover the COVID-19 pandemic because "respiratory diseases were excluded from the contract". Hellfest reported that they will pursue litigation in court if Albingia doesn't comply with their requests.
