= Graeme Williamson =

Australian rules footballer

Personal information
- Full name: Graeme Williamson
- Born: 15 November 1964 (age 61)
- Original team: Colac-Coragulac
- Height: 192 cm (6 ft 4 in)
- Weight: 87 kg (192 lb)

Playing career^{1}
Years	Club	Games (Goals)
1984; 1986	Fitzroy	9 (1)
- ^{1} Playing statistics correct to the end of 1986.

Graeme Williamson is a former Australian rules footballer, who played for the Fitzroy Football Club in the Victorian Football League (VFL).

== Career ==
Williamson played four games for Fitzroy in the 1984 season, before returning in the 1986 season to play five more.
