= Revolution Radio =

Studio album by Green Day
- Released: October 7, 2016
- Recorded: 2015–2016
- Studios: OTIS (Oakland, California, US)
- Genres: Punk rock; pop-punk; alternative rock
- Length: 44:29
- Label: Reprise
- Producer: Green Day

Green Day chronology
Demolicious (2014)	Revolution Radio (2016)	Greatest Hits: God's Favorite Band (2017)

Green Day studio chronology
¡Tré! (2012)	Revolution Radio (2016)	Father of All Motherfuckers (2020)

Singles from Revolution Radio
- 1. "Bang Bang" Released: August 11, 2016; 2. "Revolution Radio" Released: September 9, 2016; 3. "Still Breathing" Released: September 23, 2016

Revolution Radio is the twelfth studio album by the American rock band Green Day, released on October 7, 2016, through Reprise Records. A self-produced effort, it marked their first release since 2009's 21st Century Breakdown not to be produced by longtime producer Rob Cavallo. It is also their first release since that album to be recorded as a trio.

Three singles were released from the album: "Bang Bang", "Revolution Radio", and "Still Breathing". The album received generally positive reviews from music critics, appeared on multiple year-end lists, and sold 95,000 first-week album-equivalent units in the US to debut at number one on the Billboard 200. Revolution Radio also debuted at number one in the United Kingdom, Ireland, Italy, Canada, and New Zealand.

== Background and composition ==
Work on what would become Revolution Radio began in 2014, following the 99 Revolutions Tour, in support of ¡Uno!, ¡Dos!, and ¡Tré! (2012).

After acknowledging that the trilogy of albums had "absolutely no direction to them" and were an attempt at being "prolific for the sake of it", lead singer and guitarist Billie Joe Armstrong claimed that the record is "not so much a makeover as a make under". The lead single, "Bang Bang", described by Armstrong is about "the culture of mass shooting that happens in America mixed with narcissistic social media."

The album's lead single, "Bang Bang", premiered on August 11, 2016. Prior to the album's release, its title track, "Revolution Radio", and "Still Breathing" were released on September 9 and September 23, respectively. On the album's release date, the official lyric video for "Youngblood" was uploaded on the band's website. On October 12, a lyric video for the song "Ordinary World" was released. On October 19, another lyric video was released, for the song "Say Goodbye". On November 7, a music video was released for "Still Breathing". On January 16, a lyric video was released for "Troubled Times". On September 8, a lyric video for the song "Too Dumb to Die" was released. The album's final track "Ordinary World" was featured in the 2016 film of the same name, which starred Armstrong. On December 13, 2018, an official music video for "Youngblood" was released with the caption "Merry Xmas 2018" on the band's YouTube channel.

Professional reviewers describe the album as punk rock, pop-punk, and alternative rock.

== Critical reception ==
Professional ratings
Aggregate scores
Source	Rating
Metacritic	72/100
Review scores
Source	Rating
AllMusic	3.5/5 stars
Alternative Press	4/5 stars
The Guardian	3/5 stars
Kerrang!	5/5 stars
Mojo	3/5 stars
NME	4/5 stars
Pitchfork	5.1/10
Q	4/5 stars
Rolling Stone	4/5 stars
Slant Magazine	3/5 stars
Uncut	3.5/5 stars

Revolution Radio received positive reviews from music critics. At Metacritic, which assigns a normalized rating out of 100 to reviews from mainstream critics, the album has an average score of 72 out of 100, which indicates "generally favorable reviews" based on 29 reviews.

Aaron Burgess at Alternative Press observed, "It's the first time in years Green Day haven't had all the answers. But as a statement on how it really feels to fight, it's the closest to the truth they've ever gotten." Gwilym Mumford of The Guardian stated "[after their last few albums] the band have decided to get back to basics: Revolution Radio is their most focused work in years. Lead single Bang Bang sets the tone, with a caustic consideration of the fame-hungry psychosis of a mass shooter."

=== Accolades ===
Accolades for Revolution Radio
Publication	Accolade	Year	Rank
Rolling Stone	50 Best Albums of 2016	2016	15
NME	NME's Albums of the Year 2016	2016	39
Radio X	The 25 Best Albums of 2016	2016	14
Kerrang!	2016 – The Ultimate Rock Review, Top 50 Albums of 2016	2016	1

== Commercial performance ==
Revolution Radio debuted at number one on the US Billboard 200 with 95,000 album-equivalent units, of which 90,000 were album sales. The album also debuted at number one in the UK, Ireland, Italy, and New Zealand. The album had first-week units of 30,880 in the UK, 29,470 of which were from album sales. The album charted at number 10 in the US in its second week with 21,000 units. The album sold 118,000 copies in the first three weeks in the US.

== Track listing ==
All lyrics written by Billie Joe Armstrong; all music composed by Green Day (Armstrong, Mike Dirnt, Tré Cool), except where noted.

No.	Title	Music	Length
1.	"Somewhere Now"		4:08
2.	"Bang Bang"		3:25
3.	"Revolution Radio"		3:00
4.	"Say Goodbye"		3:39
5.	"Outlaws"	Green Day; Jon Fratelli	5:02
6.	"Bouncing off the Wall"		2:40
7.	"Still Breathing"	Green Day; Richard Parkhouse; Adam Slack; Luke Spiller; George Tizzard; Joshua Wilkinson	3:44
8.	"Youngblood"		2:32
9.	"Too Dumb to Die"		3:23
10.	"Troubled Times"		3:04
11.	"Forever Now": I. "I'm Freaking Out"; II. "A Better Way to Die"; III. "Somewhere Now" (Reprise)		6:52: 1:57; 1:47; 3:08
12.	"Ordinary World"	Armstrong	3:00
Total length:			44:29

Japanese edition bonus track
No.	Title	Length
13.	"Letterbomb" (live at the Cricket Wireless Amphitheatre, Chula Vista, California; September 2, 2010)	4:34
Total length:		49:03

Note

- The songwriters of the Struts' 2013 song "Could Have Been Me" received co-writing credits on "Still Breathing" due to similarities between the songs' melodies.

== Personnel ==
Green Day

- Billie Joe Armstrong – guitar, vocals, producer
- Mike Dirnt – bass, vocals, producer
- Tré Cool – drums, percussion, producer

Additional musicians

- Ronnie Blake – trumpet on "Bouncing off the Wall"

Production

- Chris Dugan – engineer
- Andrew Scheps – mixer
- Eric Boulanger – mastering
- Justin Hergett – mixing assistant
- Bill Schneider – guitar tech
- Andrew Hans Buscher – guitar tech

Artwork

- Nick Spanos – cover photo
- Frank Maddocks – creative direction, photography, design

== Charts ==
=== Weekly charts ===
Weekly chart performance for Revolution Radio
Chart (2016)	Peak position
Australian Albums (ARIA)	2
Austrian Albums (Ö3 Austria)	4
Belgian Albums (Ultratop Flanders)	1
Belgian Albums (Ultratop Wallonia)	6
Canadian Albums (Billboard)	1
Croatian International Albums (HDU)	1
Danish Albums (Hitlisten)	31
Dutch Albums (Album Top 100)	4
Finnish Albums (Suomen virallinen lista)	5
French Albums (SNEP)	13
German Albums (Offizielle Top 100)	2
Greek Albums (IFPI Greece)	1
Hungarian Albums (MAHASZ)	6
Irish Albums (IRMA)	1
Italian Albums (FIMI)	1
Japanese Albums (Oricon)	8
New Zealand Albums (RMNZ)	1
Norwegian Albums (VG-lista)	8
Polish Albums (ZPAV)	20
Portuguese Albums (AFP)	8
Scottish Albums (Official Charts)	1
South Korean International Albums (Circle)	1
Spanish Albums (Promusicae)	6
Swedish Albums (Sverigetopplistan)	1
Swiss Albums (Schweizer Hitparade)	1
UK Albums (Official Charts)	1
US Billboard 200	1
US Top Alternative Albums (Billboard)	1
US Top Rock Albums (Billboard)	1

=== Year-end charts ===
2016 year-end chart performance for Revolution Radio
Chart (2016)	Position
Australian Albums (ARIA)	89
Austrian Albums (Ö3 Austria)	69
Belgian Albums (Ultratop Flanders)	89
Belgian Albums (Ultratop Wallonia)	144
Italian Albums (FIMI)	71
South Korean International Albums (Gaon)	85
Swiss Albums (Schweizer Hitparade)	71
UK Albums (OCC)	94
US Billboard 200	195
US Top Rock Albums (Billboard)	20

2017 year-end chart performance for Revolution Radio
Chart (2017)	Position
US Top Rock Albums (Billboard)	71

== Certifications ==
Certifications for Revolution Radio
Region	Certification	Certified units/sales
Italy (FIMI)	Gold	25,000^{‡}
United Kingdom (BPI)	Gold	100,000^{‡}
United States	—	118,000
Summaries
Worldwide	—	600,000
^{‡} Sales+streaming figures based on certification alone.
