= Bang Bang (Green Day song) =

Single by Green Day

from the album Revolution Radio
- B-side: "Letterbomb" (Live)
- Released: August 11, 2016
- Recorded: January 15 – July 24, 2016
- Studio: OTIS (Oakland, CA)
- Genre: Hardcore punk; melodic hardcore; punk rock
- Length: 3:25
- Label: Reprise
- Songwriters: Billie Joe Armstrong; Mike Dirnt; Tré Cool
- Producer: Green Day

Green Day singles chronology
"Xmas Time of the Year" (2015)	"Bang Bang" (2016)	"Revolution Radio" (2016)

Music video
- "Bang Bang" on YouTube

"Bang Bang" is a song by American rock band Green Day, released as the lead single from their twelfth studio album, Revolution Radio (2016), on August 11, 2016. Regarded as combining elements of the band's early punk rock days with themes from their politically motivated later albums, the song was inspired by the events of mass shootings in the United States and is written from the viewpoint of a mass shooter.

The single's music video was released on September 13, 2016, showcasing a trio, with masks of the band members' faces, robbing a bank, and then attending a house party where the band is performing. The song received positive critical reception, peaking at number one on the US Mainstream Rock, Alternative Songs, Rock Airplay, Canada Rock, and the UK Rock charts, as well as multiple international charts.

== Background and composition ==
Billie Joe Armstrong started testing and recording material in Otis, the studio he built in Oakland, California, in 2014. The first song he composed turned out to be "Bang Bang". Self-described as "the most aggressive single we've ever had", it is written from the point of view of a mass shooter. According to Armstrong, the song is about "the culture of mass shooting that happens in America mixed with narcissistic social media". Armstrong feels that because incidents of society's rage are now being recorded by everyone, people surveil themselves which he feels is "so twisted".

The song is described by critics as reminiscent of Green Day's early melodic punk rock days of 39/Smooth (1990), Kerplunk! (1992), and Dookie (1994), with hints of American Idiot (2004) and 21st Century Breakdown (2009). "Bang Bang" is considered a combination of the "'90s Green Day sound and the 2000s Green Day lyrics". It was described as reflecting the state of confusion in today's world while one tries to figure out their position in the chaos. Armstrong has noted that this has been "a big theme through all of Green Day's history" – the state of "feeling lost".

Critics have cited the song's style as punk rock and hardcore punk.

== Release ==
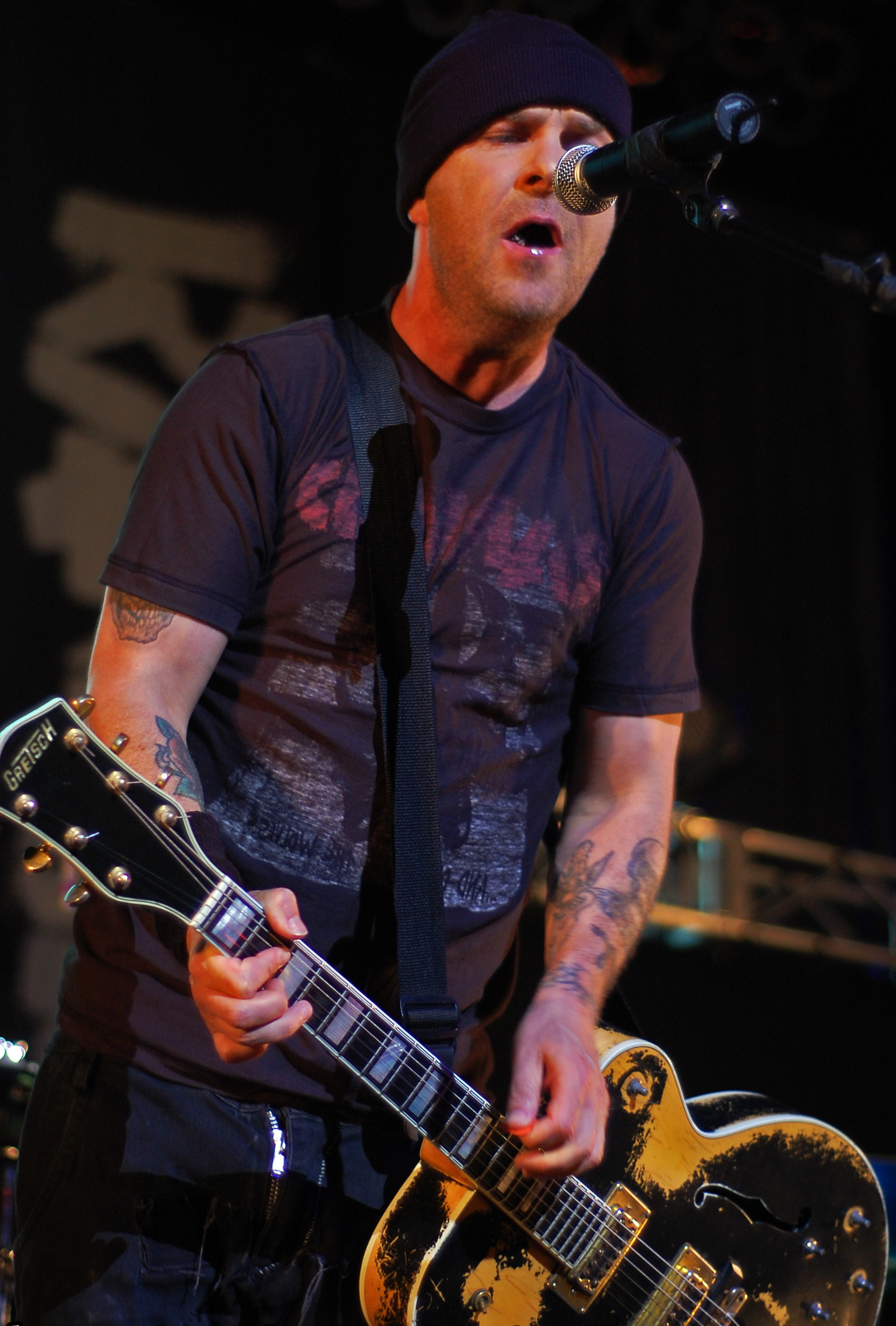
Tim Armstrong, frontman of Rancid, directed the music video.

"Bang Bang" was released on August 11, 2016, via digital download as the lead single from their forthcoming studio album, Revolution Radio (2016). The band also released the single's official lyric video on August 12, which had been viewed over two million times by August 17. It was noted the lyric video was inspired by recent incidents of mass shootings in the US. On August 28, the band announced on its website that the single would be released on CD for sale exclusively at Best Buy in the US only, and would include a live version of "Letterbomb" (2004) as the B-side. A music video was released for the song on September 13, 2016.

=== Music video ===
The music video for "Bang Bang" was released on September 13, 2016. Inspired by the rise in gun violence in the US, it depicts a trio of criminals, wearing face masks of Green Day's members, robbing a bank during the first half. These scenes are intercut with footage of the band performing amidst a house party. During the second verse, the criminals flee the bank and remove their masks, revealing themselves as two young women and a young man, before driving off in a Jeep, eventually arriving at the house party where Green Day is playing. During the bridge and final chorus, the robbers make their way through the crowd and approach the band, before tossing money from the robbery into the air as the video fades out. The blonde woman of the three criminals, who disguises herself as bassist Mike Dirnt, is portrayed by Ukrainian actress Ivanna Sakhno. Rancid frontman Tim Armstrong, who directed the video, also makes a cameo appearance as a punk during the song's bridge.

It is Green Day's first video since "21st Century Breakdown" not to feature Jason White performing with the band.

== Critical reception ==
"Bang Bang" received a positive reception from critics on its release. Gigwise praised it saying: "The song is Green Day at their punky best. It's far more in line with the intensity of stuff on Dookie than the ballads on American Idiot." Thomas Smith at NME observed: "Musically, it's classic Green Day; limited power chords used to furious effect, a maelstrom of abrasive punk rock that's aided by Mike Dirnt's rumbling bass and Tré Cool's on-point drumming. On this evidence, Green Day have found a way to stay relevant." Joseph R. Atilano, of Inquirer.net, concurred and said the song "does not sound 'glossy', 'too clean cut around the edges' nor overly polished". He added that it "sounds aesthetically right", especially for those who "want to hear the 'Green Day of old' once more".

Rolling Stone described "Bang Bang" as the "fastest, [and] most aggressive song on the album". Craig Mclean for Q described the song as a "jolt of frantic, melodic hardcore", and further added that "it's an appropriate trailblazer for an album on which Armstrong again taps into the societal and political frustration". Maria Sherman of Spin felt the band is at "their heaviest" on the track and compared it to American Idiot saying it is "both insensitive and hits close to home". William Sutton of PopMatters commented that "Bang Bang" is "much better than most of their output since the release of American Idiot". However, he criticized the track for sounding too familiar and felt the band has done better. Brad Nelson of Pitchfork similarly criticized the track, observing how, lyrically, the song contained "incoherent combinations of social media jargon and historical violence".

== Chart performance ==
The song debuted at number 16 on the US Alternative Songs chart, marking the band's 24th top 20 entry and, its fifth highest debut ever. "Bang Bang" was also the band's 31st entry on the chart, tying them with Foo Fighters and Red Hot Chili Peppers for third as the most charted artists in the history of the charts, behind Pearl Jam and U2 with 38 and 41 entries respectively. The single became their 10th number one on the chart, tying them with Foo Fighters for the third most number ones, behind Linkin Park with 11 and Red Hot Chili Peppers with 13. Green Day also became the fourth band in the history of the US Alternative Songs chart to reach the number one spot in three separate decades; the others being U2, Red Hot Chili Peppers, and Foo Fighters.

"Bang Bang" debuted at number 17 on the US Mainstream Rock chart, their second highest debut, after "Oh Love" (2012) at number 13. The song reached number one three weeks after its release becoming Green Day's fastest leap to the number one position on the US Mainstream Rock chart, breaking the previous record of five weeks for "Know Your Enemy" (2009). It is tied with "The Day That Never Comes" (2008) by Metallica as the second-fastest song to reach the top of the chart, behind Foo Fighters' "Something from Nothing" (2014) which took two weeks. The song also debuted at number eight and peaked at number one on the US Rock Airplay chart.

It also reached number four on the US Bubbling Under Hot 100 Singles and number eight on the Hot Rock Songs chart. "Bang Bang" also peaked at number one on the Canada Rock and UK Rock charts, and number two on the New Zealand Heatseekers chart. Along with charting on the Canadian Hot 100 and the UK Singles Chart, "Bang Bang" also appeared on charts in Belgium, Scotland, Australia, and Japan.

== Credits and personnel ==
Credits are adapted from iTunes.

Green Day

- Billie Joe Armstrong – vocals, guitar, songwriter, producer
- Mike Dirnt – vocals, bass guitar, composer, producer
- Tré Cool – drums, composer, producer

Additional personnel

- Andrew Scheps – mixing engineer
- Éric Boulanger – mastering engineer
- Chris Dugan – audio engineer
- Justin Hergett – assistant mixing engineer

== Track listing ==
All lyrics are written by Billie Joe Armstrong; all music is composed by Green Day.

Digital download
No.	Title	Length
1.	"Bang Bang"	3:27

Best Buy CD Single
No.	Title	Length
1.	"Bang Bang"	3:27
2.	"Letterbomb" (live from Chula Vista, California on September 2, 2010)	4:34
Total length:		8:01

== Charts ==
=== Weekly charts ===
Weekly chart performance for "Bang Bang"
Chart (2016)	Peak position
Australia (ARIA)	83
Belgium (Ultratip Bubbling Under Flanders)	3
Canada Hot 100 (Billboard)	75
Canada Rock (Billboard)	1
Italy (Musica e Dischi)	32
Japan Hot 100 (Billboard)	91
New Zealand Heatseekers (Recorded Music NZ)	2
Scotland Singles (Official Charts)	36
UK Singles (Official Charts)	84
UK Rock & Metal (Official Charts)	1
US Bubbling Under Hot 100 (Billboard)	4
US Hot Rock & Alternative Songs (Billboard)	8
US Rock & Alternative Airplay (Billboard)	1

=== Year-end charts ===
Year-end chart performance for "Bang Bang"
Chart (2016)	Position
US Hot Rock Songs (Billboard)	42
US Rock Airplay (Billboard)	16
