= Eric Boulanger =

American mastering engineer (born 1985)

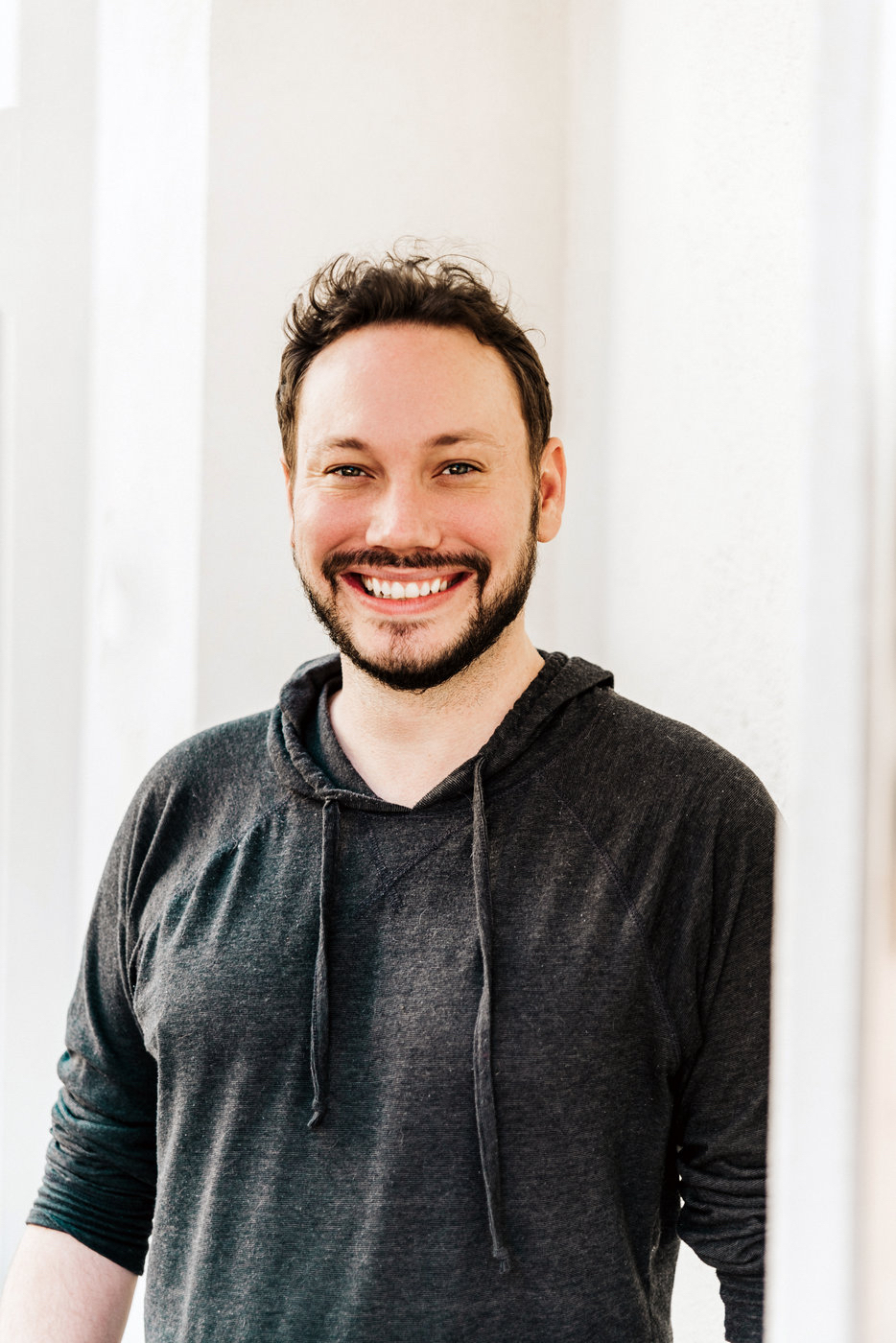
- Boulanger in 2019
- Born: August 5th 1985; New Jersey, USA
- Education: Carnegie Mellon University
- Occupations: Mastering Engineer, Violinist
- Organization: The Bakery®
- Website: www.thebakery.la

Eric Boulanger is an American mastering engineer and professional violinist. Eric is owner and chief engineer of the Bakery, an audio and vinyl mastering studio located in Los Angeles, California. Boulanger has worked with artists including Weezer, Green Day, Barbra Streisand, the Carpenters, and on the soundtrack to the film La La Land.

In 2018, Eric won a Latin Grammy Award for Best Engineered Album for 50 Años Tocando Para Ti (Orquesta Filarmónica de Bogotá) with Rafa Sardina. He also won as the mastering engineer on ¡México Por Siempre! by Luis Miguel, which won Album of the Year at the 2018 Latin Grammy Awards.

== Career ==
Boulanger is a classically trained violinist who studied at the Juilliard School, Manhattan School of Music, and the Tanglewood Festival. In 2006, he took an internship with Al Schmitt at Capitol Records in Los Angeles, and Schmitt introduced Boulanger to mastering engineer Doug Sax, who hired him the next year.

Boulanger graduated from Carnegie Mellon University in 2007 with a Bachelor of Science degree in Engineering. He then went to work for Doug Sax at the Mastering Lab in Ojai, CA. While at the Mastering Lab, Boulanger worked as a mastering engineer and maintained the studio's custom analog equipment.

Boulanger has been cutting vinyl since 2009, which he learned at the Mastering Lab. At the time, he had no experience with vinyl, and his first task was to build the lab’s vinyl cutting lathe.

=== Mastered for iTunes ===
Boulanger was the first engineer to work on an iTunes "Mastered for iTunes" release for Colbie Caillat's All of You (released July 12, 2011 on the iTunes Store). The MfiT was a collaboration (between NARAS and Apple) to improve the quality of digitally downloaded music, and Boulanger collaborated with Apple's engineering team on the project. Boulanger mastered the Red Hot Chili Peppers' album I'm with You as the second "Mastered for iTunes" release (August 22, 2011).

=== The Bakery ===
The Bakery opened on the Sony Pictures Lot in Culver City, CA. in 2015 after the death of Doug Sax, and the closing of the Mastering Lab. In 2020, Boulanger mastered Diana Krall's This Dream of You.
