= Belgian Scrabble Federation =

The Belgian Scrabble Federation (BSF) (French: Fédération belge de Scrabble (FBSc)) is an association for Belgian Scrabble players (playing in French). The federation has approximately 1,000 members in 60 clubs, and was the first federation for Francophone Scrabble players, founded in 1972, before the unified French Scrabble Federation and the International Francophone Scrabble Federation. As of 2026, the federation is known as the Royal Belgian Scrabble Federation (French: Fédération Royale Belge de Scrabble, FRBS). The president is Jean-Michel Hubert, who has served multiple terms as head of the federation.

The BSF maintains the national ranking of Francophone Scrabble players and organizes many tournaments of classic Scrabble and Duplicate Scrabble in Belgium. Among these tournaments is the Belgian Francophone Scrabble Championship, which takes place during the Festival de Belgique.

The BSF is a member of the International Francophone Scrabble Federation, and so its members may enter tournaments in any Francophone country. Many Belgian players have qualified for the French World Scrabble Championships which takes place each year in a different city.

== Awards ==
The most recent (2011) winner of the Belgian Scrabble Championships is Christian Pierre, having won the title 14 times since his first win in 1997. Pierre has also won the French World Scrabble Championships five times, in 1991, 1992, 1994, 1996, and 1998. The most recent World Championship win by a Belgian was Éric Vennin in 2008, in Dakar. Other World Champions include Marc Selis (twice), Hippolyte Wouters, Agnès Lempereur, and Yvon Duval.

Since the BSF's founding, the Individual World Championships have been dominated by Belgians. The first Individual World Champion (Hippolyte Wouters), as well as the first Pairs World Champions, were Belgian. However, Christian Pierre is the only Belgian to win since 1978. No Belgian has yet won the Blitz Championship; Jean-Luc Dives came third in 2006.

== Organisation ==
The federation is governed by a Board of Directors responsible for the administration and development of Scrabble in Belgium. As of 2026, the board is chaired by President Jean-Michel Hubert, with Emmanuel Leclercq serving as Director General. The federation organizes duplicate and classic Scrabble competitions, maintains the national player rankings, oversees Belgian club competitions, and selects national teams for international events organized by the Fédération Internationale de Scrabble Francophone (FISF).

== World Championships ==
Belgium has played a major role in the history of Francophone Scrabble. Belgian players won five of the first seven Individual World Championships, and Belgian competitors have continued to achieve success at international level. The federation hosted the 50th World French-language Scrabble Championships in Louvain-la-Neuve in 2022, marking both the fiftieth edition of the championship and the federation's fiftieth anniversary.
