= American Idiot World Tour =

2004–05 concert tour by Green Day

- Tour by Green Day
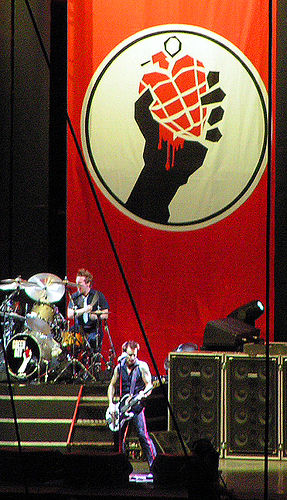
- Green Day performing at the Giants Stadium in East Rutherford, New Jersey on September 1, 2005.
- Location: Asia, Europe, North America, Oceania
- Associated album: American Idiot
- Start date: July 29, 2004
- End date: December 17, 2005
- No. of shows: 167

Green Day concert chronology
- Pop Disaster Tour (2002); American Idiot World Tour (2004–2005); 21st Century Breakdown World Tour (2009–2010)

The American Idiot World Tour was a concert tour by American rock band Green Day in support of the group's seventh studio album, American Idiot, which was released in September 2004. The tour began in Los Angeles at the Grand Olympic Auditorium on July 29, and the last show was in Australia at the Telstra Dome. During the tour, the band played at the 2004 Reading Festival in England.

During the tour, Green Day recorded a live album, Bullet in a Bible, which was released in 2005 as a CD/DVD set. The concert at which the album was recorded was in England, at the Milton Keynes National Bowl, and was attended by more than 130,000 people. The DVD sold more than 1,500,000 copies and went Platinum in the UK and in the United States.

== Background ==
Dates for the second North America leg was announced in February 2005, and lasted from April to May 2005. The third North American leg was announced in May 2005.

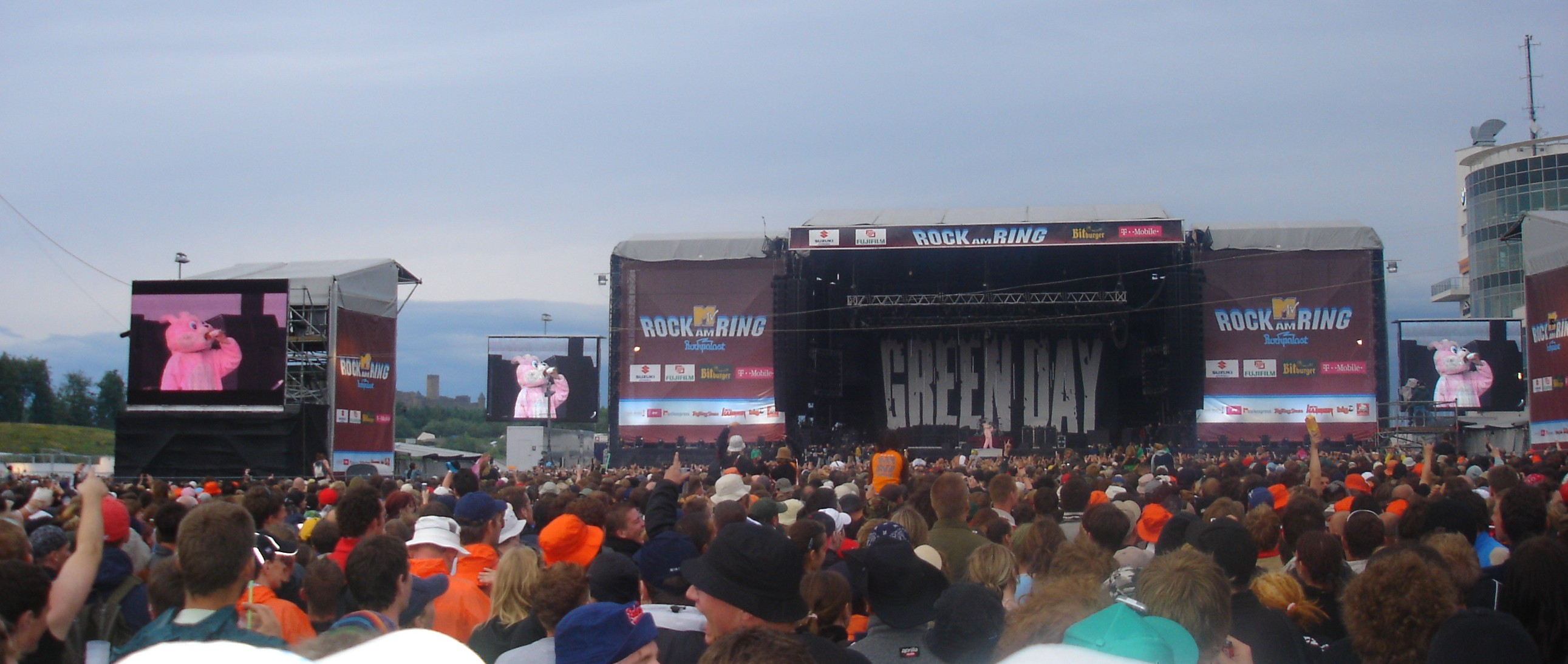
Rock am Ring 2005, one of the locations for a concert on the tour.

== Opening acts ==
Opening acts included New Found Glory, Kaiser Chiefs, My Chemical Romance, Simple Plan, Sugarcult, Jimmy Eat World, Anti-Flag and Against Me!.

== Main setlist ==
The setlist throughout the tour remained mostly the same. Green Day typically played several songs from American Idiot, Dookie, Insomniac, Nimrod and Warning ever since the Fort Worth, Texas, USA concert on October 19, 2004.

1. "American Idiot"
2. "Jesus of Suburbia"
3. "Holiday"
4. "Are We the Waiting"
5. "St. Jimmy"
6. "Longview"
7. "Hitchin' A Ride"
8. "Brain Stew"
9. "Jaded"
10. "Knowledge"
11. "Basket Case"
12. "She"
13. "King for a Day"
14. "Shout/Stand By Me"
15. "Wake Me Up When September Ends"
16. "Minority"
  Encore
17. "Maria"
18. "Boulevard of Broken Dreams"
19. "Homecoming"
20. "We Are the Champions"
21. "Good Riddance (Time of Your Life)"

== Tour dates ==
List of 2004 concerts
| Date | City | Country | Venue |
|---|---|---|---|
| September 16, 2004 | Los Angeles | United States | The Fonda Theatre |
| September 18, 2004 | Chicago | United States | The Vic Theatre |
| September 21, 2004 | New York City | United States | Irving Plaza |
| September 24, 2004 | Toronto | Canada | Phoenix Concert Theatre |
| October 16, 2004 | New Orleans (Note: This concert was a part of Voodoo Experience) | United States | City Park |
| October 19, 2004 | Fort Worth | United States | Fort Worth Convention Center |
| October 20, 2004 | Houston | United States | Reliant Arena |
| October 22, 2004 | Duluth | United States | Arena at Gwinnett Center |
| October 23, 2004 | Cincinnati | United States | U.S. Bank Arena |
| October 24, 2004 | Louisville | United States | Louisville Gardens |
| October 26, 2004 | Hershey | United States | Giant Center |
| October 28, 2004 | Worcester | United States | Centrum Centre |
| October 29, 2004 | Philadelphia | United States | Liacouras Center |
| October 30, 2004 | East Rutherford | United States | Continental Airlines Arena |
| October 31, 2004 | Fairfax | United States | Patriot Center |
| November 2, 2004 | Toronto | Canada | Air Canada Centre |
| November 3, 2004 | Mississauga | Canada | Arrow Hall |
| November 4, 2004 | Montreal | Canada | Bell Centre |
| November 5, 2004 | Rochester | United States | Blue Cross Arena |
| November 6, 2004 | Detroit | United States | Cobo Arena |
| November 8, 2004 | Chicago | United States | UIC Pavilion |
| November 9, 2004 | Milwaukee | United States | U.S. Cellular Arena |
| November 10, 2004 | Minneapolis | United States | Target Center |
| November 12, 2004 | Denver | United States | Pepsi Center |
| November 13, 2004 | West Valley City | United States | E-Center |
| November 16, 2004 | Everett | United States | Everett Events Center |
| November 17, 2004 | Vancouver | Canada | Pacific Coliseum |
| November 18, 2004 | Portland | United States | Rose Garden |
| November 20, 2004 | Bakersfield | United States | Centennial Garden |
| November 21, 2004 | San Diego | United States | Cox Arena |
| November 23, 2004 | Long Beach | United States | Long Beach Arena |
| November 24, 2004 | San Francisco | United States | Bill Graham Civic Auditorium |
| December 2, 2004 | Monterrey | Mexico | Arena Monterrey |
| December 5, 2004 | Mexico City | Mexico | Palacio de los Deportes |
| December 7, 2004 | Las Vegas | United States | The Joint |

List of 2005 concerts
| Date | City | Country | Venue |
|---|---|---|---|
| January 11, 2005 | Berlin | Germany | Arena Berlin |
| January 12, 2005 | Amsterdam | Netherlands | Heineken Music Hall |
| January 14, 2005 | Offenbach am Main | Germany | Stadthalle Offenbach |
| January 15, 2005 | Böblingen | Germany | Sporthalle Böblingen |
| January 16, 2005 | Milan | Italy | FilaForum |
| January 18, 2005 | Basel | Switzerland | St. Jakobshalle |
| January 19, 2005 | Paris | France | Zénith Paris |
| January 20, 2005 | Düsseldorf | Germany | Philipshalle |
| January 21, 2005 | Hamburg | Germany | Alsterdorfer Sporthalle |
| January 23, 2005 | Birmingham | England | National Indoor Arena |
| January 24, 2005 | London | England | Brixton Academy |
| January 25, 2005 | London | England | Brixton Academy |
| January 27, 2005 | Nottingham | England | Nottingham Arena |
| January 28, 2005 | Manchester | England | Manchester Evening News Arena |
| January 29, 2005 | Manchester | England | Manchester Evening News Arena |
| January 31, 2005 | Dublin | Ireland | The Point |
| February 2, 2005 | Plymouth | England | Plymouth Pavilions |
| February 3, 2005 | Cardiff | Wales | Cardiff International Arena |
| February 5, 2005 | Brighton | England | Brighton Centre |
| February 6, 2005 | London | England | Hammersmith Apollo |
| February 7, 2005 | London | England | Hammersmith Apollo |
| February 8, 2005 | Newcastle upon Tyne | England | Metro Radio Arena |
| February 10, 2005 | Glasgow | Scotland | SEC Centre |
| March 5, 2005 | Auckland | New Zealand | North Shore Events Centre |
| March 7, 2005 | Brisbane | Australia | Brisbane Entertainment Centre |
| March 9, 2005 | Sydney | Australia | Sydney Super Dome |
| March 10, 2005 | Melbourne | Australia | Rod Laver Arena |
| March 12, 2005 | Adelaide | Australia | Adelaide Entertainment Centre |
| March 13, 2005 | Perth (Note: This concert was a part of the Rock It festival.) | Australia | Arena Joondalup |
| March 17, 2005 | Osaka | Japan | Osaka-jō Hall |
| March 18, 2005 | Nagoya | Japan | Aichi-Ken Taiikukan |
| March 19, 2005 | Chiba | Japan | Makuhari Messe |
| March 20, 2005 | Chiba | Japan | Makuhari Messe |
| March 22, 2005 | Sapporo | Japan | Tsukisamu Dome |
| April 15, 2005 | Coral Gables | United States | University of Miami Convocation Center |
| April 16, 2005 | Orlando | United States | TD Waterhouse Centre |
| April 18, 2005 | Tampa | United States | USF Sun Dome |
| April 19, 2005 | Jacksonville | United States | Jacksonville Veterans Memorial Arena |
| April 20, 2005 | Charlotte | United States | Cricket Arena |
| April 22, 2005 | Norfolk | United States | Ted Constant Convocation Center |
| April 23, 2005 | Pittsburgh | United States | Mellon Arena |
| April 24, 2005 | Atlantic City | United States | Trump Taj Mahal |
| April 25, 2005 | Albany | United States | Pepsi Arena |
| April 27, 2005 | Vestal | United States | Binghamton University |
| April 28, 2005 | Portland | United States | Cumberland County Civic Center |
| April 29, 2005 | Manchester | United States | Verizon Wireless Arena |
| April 30, 2005 | Amherst | United States | Mullins Center |
| May 2, 2005 | Quebec City | Canada | Colisée Pepsi |
| May 4, 2005 | London | Canada | John Labatt Centre |
| May 5, 2005 | Columbus | United States | Schottenstein Center |
| May 6, 2005 | Cleveland | United States | Wolstein Center |
| May 7, 2005 | Grand Rapids | United States | Van Andel Arena |
| May 9, 2005 | Madison | United States | Alliant Energy Center |
| May 10, 2005 | Peoria | United States | Peoria Civic Center |
| May 11, 2005 | Cedar Rapids | United States | U.S. Cellular Center |
| May 13, 2005 | St. Louis | United States | Savvis Center |
| May 14, 2005 | Kansas City | United States | Municipal Auditorium |
| May 15, 2005 | Omaha | United States | Qwest Center Omaha |
| May 17, 2005 | Winnipeg | Canada | MTS Centre |
| May 19, 2005 | Edmonton | Canada | Rexall Place |
| May 20, 2005 | Calgary | Canada | Pengrowth Saddledome |
| June 3, 2005 | Nürburg | Germany | Rock am Ring |
| June 4, 2005 | Nuremberg | Germany | Rock im Park |
| June 5, 2005 | Prague | Czech Republic | Sazka Arena |
| June 7, 2005 | Katowice | Poland | Spodek |
| June 9, 2005 | Budapest | Hungary | Budapest Sports Arena |
| June 11, 2005 | Imola | Italy | Heineken Jammin' Festival |
| June 12, 2005 | Nickelsdorf | Austria | Nova Rock |
| June 18, 2005 | Milton Keynes | England | National Bowl |
| June 19, 2005 | Milton Keynes | England | National Bowl |
| June 25, 2005 | Interlaken | Switzerland | Greenfield Festival |
| June 27, 2005 | Badalona | Spain | Pavelló Olímpic de Badalona |
| June 28, 2005 | Madrid | Spain | Telefónica Arena |
| June 29, 2005 | Madrid | Spain | Telefónica Arena |
| June 30, 2005 | Lyon | France | Halle Tony Garnier |
| July 1, 2005 | Werchter | Belgium | Rock Werchter |
| July 2, 2005 | Roskilde | Denmark | Roskilde Festival |
| July 3, 2005 | Gothenburg | Sweden | Scandinavium |
| July 5, 2005 | Kristiansand | Norway | Quart Festival |
| July 7, 2005 | Rotterdam | Netherlands | Rotterdam Ahoy |
| July 9, 2005 | Naas | Ireland | Oxegen |
| July 10, 2005 | Kinross | Scotland | T in the Park |
| August 10, 2005 | Rosemont | United States | Allstate Arena |
| August 12, 2005 | Barrie | Canada | Molsons Park |
| August 13, 2005 | Buffalo | United States | HSBC Arena |
| August 14, 2005 | Fairborn | United States | Nutter Center |
| August 15, 2005 | Nashville | United States | Gaylord Entertainment Center |
| August 17, 2005 | Oklahoma City | United States | Ford Center |
| August 19, 2005 | Houston | United States | Toyota Center |
| August 20, 2005 | Dallas | United States | American Airlines Center |
| August 21, 2005 | San Antonio | United States | AT&T Center |
| August 23, 2005 | Atlanta | United States | Philips Arena |
| August 24, 2005 | Raleigh | United States | RBC Center |
| August 26, 2005 | Sunrise | United States | Office Depot Center |
| August 30, 2005 | Columbia | United States | Merriweather Post Pavilion |
| September 1, 2005 | East Rutherford | United States | Giants Stadium |
| September 3, 2005 | Foxborough | United States | Gillette Stadium |
| September 4, 2005 | Montreal | Canada | Parc Jean-Drapeau |
| September 5, 2005 | Ottawa | Canada | Corel Centre |
| September 7, 2005 | Philadelphia | United States | Wachovia Center |
| September 9, 2005 | Connecticut | United States | Hartford Civic Center |
| September 11, 2005 | Auburn Hills | United States | The Palace of Auburn Hills |
| September 12, 2005 | Indianapolis | United States | Conseco Fieldhouse |
| September 14, 2005 | Moline | United States | The MARK of the Quads |
| September 16, 2005 | St. Paul | United States | Xcel Energy Center |
| September 17, 2005 | Des Moines | United States | Wells Fargo Arena |
| September 19, 2005 | Denver | United States | Pepsi Center |
| September 21, 2005 | Salt Lake City | United States | Delta Center |
| September 24, 2005 | San Francisco | United States | SBC Park |
| September 26, 2005 | Tacoma | United States | Tacoma Dome |
| September 27, 2005 | Vancouver | Canada | GM Place |
| September 30, 2005 | Sacramento | United States | ARCO Arena |
| October 1, 2005 | Fresno | United States | Save Mart Center |
| October 2, 2005 | Chula Vista | United States | Coors Amphitheatre |
| October 4, 2005 | Albuquerque | United States | Journal Pavilion |
| October 5, 2005 | Phoenix | United States | America West Arena |
| October 6, 2005 | Las Vegas | United States | Thomas & Mack Center |
| October 8, 2005 | Carson | United States | Home Depot Center |
| October 9, 2005 | Carson | United States | Home Depot Center |
| October 10, 2005 | Carson | United States | Home Depot Center |
| October 11, 2005 | Los Angeles | United States | Wiltern LG Theatre |
| October 13, 2005 | San Francisco | United States | The Warfield |
| October 14, 2005 | Los Angeles | United States | Wiltern LG Theatre |
| October 16, 2005 | Nashville | United States | Gaylord Entertainment Center |
| October 17, 2005 | Fairborn | United States | Ervin J. Nutter Center |
| December 14, 2005 | Sydney | Australia | Sydney Cricket Ground |
| December 17, 2005 | Melbourne | Australia | Telstra Dome |

List of festivals

== Personnel ==
- Billie Joe Armstrong – Lead vocals, lead and rhythm guitars, harmonica on "Minority"
- Mike Dirnt – Bass, backing vocals, lead vocals on "Homecoming" (Nobody likes you)
- Tré Cool – Drums, percussion, backing vocals on "King For A Day/Shout", lead vocals on "Homecoming" (Rock'n'roll Girlfriend)
- Jason White – Lead guitar, backing vocals
- Jason Freese – Keyboards, saxophone, trombone, accordion, acoustic guitar, backing vocals
- Kurt Lohmiller – (July 2004 – Late January 2005) – Backing vocals, percussion, trumpet
- Ronnie Blake – (Late January 2005 – December 2005) – Backing vocals, percussion, trumpet
- Mike Pelino (September 2004 & April 2005 – December 2005) – Rhythm guitar, backing vocals on "St. Jimmy"
- Bobby Schneck (October 2004 – March 2005) – Rhythm guitar, backing vocals on "St. Jimmy"
