= Bullet in a Bible =

Live album by Green Day

Live album and video by Green Day
- Released: November 15, 2005
- Recorded: June 18–19, 2005
- Venues: National Bowl, Milton Keynes
- Genre: Punk rock
- Length: 64:57
- Labels: Reprise; Warner Reprise Video
- Director: Samuel Bayer
- Producers: Rob Cavallo; Green Day

Green Day chronology
American Idiot (2004)	Bullet in a Bible (2005)	21st Century Breakdown (2009)

Professional ratings
Review scores
Source	Rating
AllMusic	4/5 stars
Encyclopedia of Popular Music	3/5 stars
IGN	7.9/10
Pitchfork Media	3.0/10
PopMatters	8/10 stars
Sputnikmusic	3/5

Bullet in a Bible is a live album by American rock band Green Day, released on November 15, 2005, by Reprise Records. Recorded during their American Idiot World Tour, it was directed by Samuel Bayer, who was the director of all the videos from American Idiot.

== Background and release ==
Bullet in a Bible documents one of the two biggest shows that Green Day have performed in their career; they played in front of a crowd of over 130,000 people at the Milton Keynes National Bowl in United Kingdom on June 18–19, 2005.

This was also the hottest weekend of the year, because the United Kingdom was in the middle of a heatwave, with temperatures reaching 33 degrees Celsius.

The band was supported by Jimmy Eat World, Taking Back Sunday, and Hard-Fi during their American Idiot world tour. Fourteen of the twenty songs performed at these shows were included on the disc; missing out were the tracks "Jaded", "Knowledge", "She", "Maria", "Homecoming" and "We Are the Champions". However, "She" was broadcast on BBC Radio 1 as part of their coverage of the event.

Bullet in a Bible was released as a double-LP set on November 10, 2009, as part of the band's 2009 vinyl re-release campaign.

Green Day have released most of the videos from this concert on their YouTube page except for "Boulevard of Broken Dreams", "Wake Me Up When September Ends", and the other songs which have been omitted from the album release.

== Commercial performance ==
Bullet in a Bible peaked on the Billboard 200 at number eight and spent 14 weeks on the chart. It has also reached top 10 positions in many European countries.

== Track listing ==
No.	Title	Length
1.	"American Idiot"	4:32
2.	"Jesus of Suburbia"	9:23
3.	"Holiday"	4:12
4.	"Are We the Waiting"	2:49
5.	"St. Jimmy"	2:55
6.	"Longview"	4:44
7.	"Hitchin' a Ride"	4:03
8.	"Brain Stew"	3:02
9.	"Basket Case"	2:58
10.	"King for a Day/Shout" ("Shout" written and originally performed by the Isley Brothers)	8:47
11.	"Wake Me Up When September Ends"	5:03
12.	"Minority"	4:19
13.	"Boulevard of Broken Dreams"	4:44
14.	"Good Riddance (Time of Your Life)"	3:26
Total length:		64:57

Note: "Jaded", "Homecoming", "Maria", "She" and "We Are the Champions" were played but not included.

== Personnel ==
Green Day

- Billie Joe Armstrong – lead vocals, guitar, harmonica
- Mike Dirnt – bass, backing vocals
- Tré Cool – drums, backing vocals on "King for a Day/Shout"

Additional musicians

- Jason White – guitar, backing vocals
- Jason Freese – keyboards, acoustic guitar, trombone, saxophone, backing vocals
- Ronnie Blake – trumpet, percussion, backing vocals
- Mike Pelino – guitar, backing vocals on "St. Jimmy"

=== Production ===
CD

- Rob Cavallo – producer
- Green Day – producers
- Doug McKean – engineer
- Chris Lord-Alge – mixing
- Dmitar Krnjaic – assistant engineer
- Keith Armstrong – assistant engineer
- John Van Nest – editing
- Ted Jensen – mastering

DVD

- Samuel Bayer – director
- Tim Lynch – producer
- Pat Magnarella – executive producer
- Kim Dellara – executive producer
- Tim Royes – editor
- Chris Dugan – additional filming

Design

- Wade Brands – photography
- Chris Bilheimer – packaging, menu design

== Charts ==
=== Weekly charts ===
Weekly chart performance for Bullet in a Bible
Chart (2005–06)	Peak position
Australian Albums (ARIA)	8
Austrian Albums (Ö3 Austria)	5
Belgian Albums (Ultratop Flanders)	34
Belgian Albums (Ultratop Wallonia)	15
Danish Albums (Hitlisten)	15
Dutch Albums (Album Top 100)	26
Finnish Albums (Suomen virallinen lista)	21
French Albums (SNEP)	21
German Albums (Offizielle Top 100)	7
Greek Albums (IFPI)	2
Hungarian Albums (MAHASZ)	38
Italian Albums (FIMI)	8
New Zealand Albums (RMNZ)	5
Norwegian Albums (VG-lista)	30
Portuguese Albums (AFP)	9
Swedish Albums (Sverigetopplistan)	7
Swiss Albums (Schweizer Hitparade)	11
Taiwanese Albums (Five Music)	18
UK Albums (Official Charts)	6
US Billboard 200	8

=== Year-end charts ===
2005 year-end chart performance for Bullet in a Bible
Chart (2005)	Position
Australian Albums (ARIA)	75
French Albums (SNEP)	154
Italian Albums (FIMI)	39
New Zealand Albums (RMNZ)	45
Swedish Albums (Sverigetopplistan)	57
UK Albums (OCC)	64
Worldwide Albums (IFPI)	46

2006 year-end chart performance for Bullet in a Bible
Chart (2006)	Position
Argentinian Albums (CAPIF)	10
Australian Albums (ARIA)	62
Austrian Albums (Ö3 Austria)	6
European Hot 100 Albums (Billboard)	87
Greek Foreign Albums (IFPI)	43
Italian Albums (FIMI)	93
US Billboard 200	149

== Certifications and sales ==
Certifications and sales for Bullet in a Bible (album)
Region	Certification	Certified units/sales
Australia (ARIA)	Platinum	70,000^{^}
Austria (IFPI Austria)	Gold	15,000^{*}
Denmark (IFPI Danmark)	Gold	20,000^{^}
Germany (BVMI)	Gold	100,000^{^}
Ireland (IRMA)	2× Platinum	30,000^{^}
Italy sales in 2006	—	100,000
Mexico (AMPROFON)	Gold	50,000^{^}
New Zealand (RMNZ)	Platinum	15,000^{‡}
Portugal (AFP)	Gold	10,000^{^}
Sweden (GLF)	Gold	30,000^{^}
United Kingdom (BPI)	Platinum	300,000^{^}
^{*} Sales figures based on certification alone.^{^} Shipments figures based on certification alone.^{‡} Sales+streaming figures based on certification alone.

Certifications and sales for Bullet in a Bible (video album)
Region	Certification	Certified units/sales
Argentina (CAPIF)	Platinum	8,000^{^}
Brazil (Pro-Música Brasil)	Gold	25,000^{*}
Germany (BVMI)	7× Gold	175,000^{^}
^{*} Sales figures based on certification alone.^{^} Shipments figures based on certification alone.
