= Reproduction (disambiguation) =

Reproduction may mean:

- Reproduction, the biological process by which new individual organisms are produced
  - Asexual reproduction, where an organism creates a copy of itself; there is no genetic contribution from another organism
  - Sexual reproduction, where two organisms contribute genetic material in the creation of a new individual organism
- Self-replication, mechanical, memetic and other form of self-replication
- Reproduction (economics), in Marxian economics, recurrent (or cyclical) processes by which the initial conditions necessary for economic activity to occur are constantly re-created
- Reproducibility, the ability for a scientific experiment to be performed multiple times
- Reproduction auto part or 'repro', remanufacturing of obsolete automotive spares
- Social or cultural reproduction, a sociological phenomenon
- Sound reproduction, audio recording and replay
- Reproduction (journal)
- Reproduction or replica furniture, articles copying an earlier style

== Entertainment ==
- Reproduction (album), a 1979 album by British electronic band The Human League
- Reproductions (album), a 2007 album by singer Charlotte Martin
- Reproduction (novel), a 2019 novel by Ian Williams

== See also ==
- Copy (disambiguation)
