= Duplication =

Duplication, duplicate, and duplicator may refer to:

== Biology and genetics ==
- Gene duplication, a process which can result in free mutation
- Chromosomal duplication, which can cause Bloom and Rett syndrome
- Polyploidy, a phenomenon also known as ancient genome duplication
- Enteric duplication cysts, certain portions of the gastrointestinal tract
- Diprosopus, a form of cojoined twins also known as craniofacial duplication
- Diphallia, a medical condition also known as penile duplication

== Computing ==
- Duplicate code, a source code sequence that occurs more than once in a program
- Duplicate characters in Unicode, pairs of single Unicode code points that are canonically equivalent. The reason for this are compatibility issues with legacy systems
- Data redundancy, either wanted or unwanted (in which case one resorts to data deduplication)
- Content copying through cut, copy, and paste
- File copying

== Mathematics ==
- Duplication, or doubling, multiplication by 2
- Duplication matrix, a linear transformation dealing with half-vectorization
- Doubling the cube, a problem in geometry also known as duplication of the cube
- A type of multiplication theorem called the Legendre duplication formula or simply "duplication formula"

== Technology ==
- Duplicating machines, machines and processes designed to reproduce printed material, photocopying being among the best-known today; see also List of duplicating processes
- Loop bin duplicator, a device designed to copy pre-recorded audio tapes
- Double track, a method of railway design also known as track duplication
- In road construction, conversion of a single carriageway into Dual carriageway

== Art and fiction ==
- Duplicate (1998 film), a Bollywood film directed by Mahesh Bhatt
- Duplicate (2009 film), a 2009 Malayalam film
- Duplicates, a 1992 television film starring Gregory Harrison and Kim Greist
- The Duplicate, a 1988 children's book by William Sleater
- Batman Duplicate, a villain in Batman: The Animated Series
- "The Duplicate Man", a 1964 episode of The Outer Limits
- The duplicator machine in Calvin and Hobbes
- "Duplicate", a song by White Town from Peek & Poke
- "Duplicates", a song by We Are the Physics from We Are the Physics Are OK at Music

== Other uses ==
- Duplicate publication, the publication same intellectual material by the same author twice
- Reduplication, a morphological process in linguistics
- Duplicate bridge, a popular variant of contract bridge
- Duplicate Scrabble, a Scrabble variant popular in French and some other languages
- "Decouple, duplicate, discriminate," the "three Ds" articulated by Madeleine Albright as necessary for NATO to avoid
- Duplicate, another term for Body double in films

== See also ==
- Clone, the process of producing similar populations of genetically identical individuals that occurs in nature when organisms such as bacteria, insects or plants reproduce asexually
- Copy (disambiguation)
- Doppelgänger, a paranormal double of a living person
- dup (disambiguation)
- dupe (disambiguation)
- Redundancy (disambiguation)
- Symmetry, has two meanings. The first is a vague sense of harmonious and beautiful proportion and balance. The second is an exact mathematical "patterned self-similarity" that can be demonstrated with the rules of a formal system, such as geometry or physics
