= DUP =

DUP or Dup may refer to:

== Politics ==
- Democratic Unionist Party, a conservative and unionist party in Northern Ireland
- Democratic Unionist Party (disambiguation)
- Democratic Union Party (disambiguation)
- Democratic United Party (South Korea), a former name of the Democratic Party (South Korea, 2015)

== Computing ==
- dup (system call)
- DUP programming language

== Other uses ==
- Dup (drum), a Caribbean membranophone
- Dup (cuneiform), a sign in cuneiform writing
- Dances of Universal Peace, a spiritual practice
- Daughters of Utah Pioneers, a women's organization
- Duano' language (ISO-639: dup)

== See also ==
- Dupe (disambiguation)
- Duplication (disambiguation)
