= Nice Guys Finish Last =

Single by Green Day

from the album Nimrod and Varsity Blues soundtrack
- Released: March 23, 1999 (Aus)
- Recorded: 1997
- Studio: Conway (Hollywood, California)
- Genre: Punk rock; pop-punk
- Length: 2:48
- Label: Reprise
- Composer: Green Day
- Lyricist: Billie Joe Armstrong
- Producers: Rob Cavallo; Green Day

Green Day singles chronology
"Redundant" (1998)	"Nice Guys Finish Last" (1999)	"Minority" (2000)

Music video
- "Nice Guys Finish Last" on YouTube

"Nice Guys Finish Last" is a song by American rock band Green Day. It is the opening track and the fourth and final single released from their fifth studio album, Nimrod (1997). The use of the song in the movie Varsity Blues helped propel it to hit status and earned it a nomination for an MTV Movie Award for best song from a movie in 1999.

== Track list ==
AUS single

1. "Nice Guys Finish Last"
2. "Good Riddance (Time of Your Life)" (live)
3. "The Grouch" (live)
4. "She" (live)

Tracks 2–4 were recorded live at the Electric Factory in Philadelphia, Pennsylvania.

== Reception ==
PopMatters listed "Nice Guys Finish Last" as the tenth best Green Day song, commenting "Blessed with a driving insistency and an acerbic, infectious chorus, 'Nice Guys Finish Last' should've been way bigger than it actually was."

== Music video ==
The music video features the band as a mock football team (parodying the Green Bay Packers with Green Day). The stage set up for them is portrayed as analogous to a football playing field, and in the video, a number of concert scenes are shown in ways that simulate football game action; lead singer Billie Joe Armstrong is tackled by a fan, Mike Dirnt sprains his ankle when jumping, and a coach motivates them in a locker room midway during the song. The video itself, directed by Evan Bernard, humorously extends the analogy with a voice-over emulating that of legendary NFL Films narrator John Facenda.

== Chart positions ==
Chart performance for "Nice Guys Finish Last"
Chart (1999)	Peak position
Australia (ARIA)	80
US Alternative Airplay (Billboard)	31
