= Duguet =

Duguet is a surname. Notable people with the surname include:

- Jacques Joseph Duguet (1649–1733), French theologist and jansenist
- Abbé Dieudonné Duguet or Dugué (1794–1849) Belgian composer of the hymntune DUGUET Free scores by Duguet in the Choral Public Domain Library (ChoralWiki)
- Victorin Duguet (1905–1989), French trade union leader and miner
- Michel Duguet (born 1961), French Scrabble and bridge player
- Romain Duguet (born 1980), Swiss Olympic show jumping rider
- Paola Duguet (born 1987), Colombian-American swimmer
