= Tautology =

Tautology may refer to:

- Tautology (language), a redundant statement in literature and rhetoric
- Tautology (logic), in formal logic, a statement that is true in every possible interpretation
- Tautology (rule of inference), a rule of replacement for logical expressions

== See also ==
- Pleonasm
- Redundancy (disambiguation)
- Tautological (disambiguation)
- Tautonym, a scientific name of a species in which both parts of the name have the same spelling
