= Antonin Michel =

French Language Scrabble player

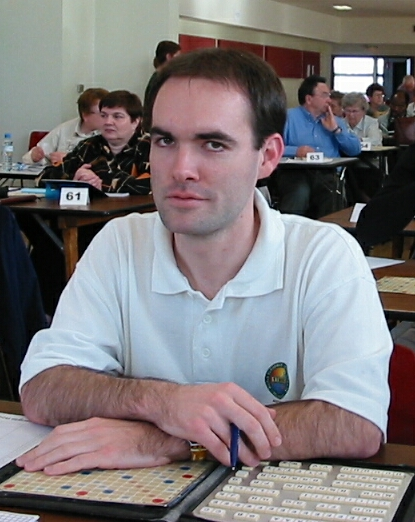
Antonin Michel in 2003.

Antonin Michel is a French Language Scrabble player who has also competed in English. He has won the French National Championship four times, the World Championship twice and finished 95th in the 1999 English World Championship.

== Career biography ==
Antonin shocked the Scrabble World in 1987 when he won the Junior World Championship - aged just nine years old. The upper age limit was 15. His next major success was winning the French National title in 1998, and shocked the Scrabble community again by competing in the English World Championship the next year - although he finished a disappointing 8 wins out of 24, -951 points, 95th place out of 98 competitors.

He would win the French title three more times, 2003-05 but would only finish tenth in 2006 despite only missing one top.

He became World Champion for the first time in 2005, with arguably the most dominating performance in the championships' history. He dropped just 4 points over 7 games, a championship record. He also won the blitz event, the pairs event, and the défi mondial (a sort of play-off game). No other player has ever won these four events together in the same championship. He finished second in 2006 but won the World Championship in 2007 having lost only 9 points over 7 games. He became the 7th player in 36 years to win the championship more than once.

== Career statistics ==
- World Champion 2005, 2007
- National Champion (France) 1998, 2003, 2004, 2005
- National Pairs Champion
  - with Fabien Douté (2003, 2004)
  - with Olivier Bernardin (2006)
  - with Thierry Chincholle (2007)
- World Blitz Champion 2001, 2004, 2005, 2006, 2008
- World Pairs Champion
  - with Fabien Fontas (2001)
  - with Philippe Lorenzo (2004)
  - with Alain Jacques (2005)
  - with Anthony Clémenceau (2006)
- Represented France in the English World Scrabble Championship in 1999
- Ranked 2nd in the FISF French World Scrabble ratings (May 2008)

== See also ==
- Francophone Scrabble
- Duplicate Scrabble
