= Dupe =

Dupe audio usually refers to someone who has been deceived into going along with an idea or program. It may also refer to:

== People ==
- Maxime Dupé (born 1993), French footballer
- Tony Dupé, Australian music producer and musician

== Arts, entertainment, and media ==
- Duping (video games), practice of exploiting a bug in a video game to illegitimately create duplicates of unique items or currency
- The Dupe, a 1916 American silent film
- The Dupes, a 1973 Syrian film

== Other uses ==
- Dupe (product), products that are similar in appearance, functionality, or design to higher-end, often more expensive, branded items but are sold at a much lower price
- Dupe, an organism targeted by mimicry
- Dupe, a duplicated warez release, see Topsite (warez)
- DuPage Theatre and DuPage Shoppes

== See also ==
- Dup (disambiguation)
- Duplication (disambiguation)
