= Cut and paste (disambiguation) =

Cut and paste is a method for digital transfer of text or other data in computing

Cut and paste may also refer to:

- Cut & Paste, a 1984 word processor from Electronic Arts
- Cut and Paste (film), a 2006 Egyptian film

== See also ==
- Copy and paste (disambiguation)
