= Germain Boulianne =

Québécois Francophone Scrabble player

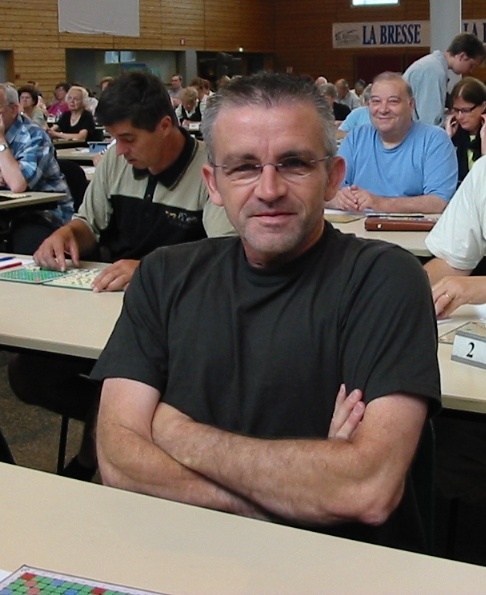
- Boulianne in 2006
- Born: 16 February 1960 (age 66); Quebec, Canada
- Known for: Scrabble player

Germain Boulianne (French pronunciation: [ʒɛʁ.me bul.jan]; born 16 February 1960) is a Francophone Scrabble player from Baie-Sainte-Catherine, Quebec, and a member of the Outaouais Scrabble Club. He has won the Quebec Scrabble Championship nine times. In 2004 in Marrakesh, became the first Québécois player to have won the French World Scrabble Championship, also becoming the first non-European player to do so.

In 2006, he tied François Bédard's record by winning his seventh Quebec championship title. In 2008, he won the Quebec championship again, finishing ahead of Bédard and setting a new Quebec record with 8 national titles. In 2014, he was dubbed "The Québec Master of Scrabble" or "le maître du Scrabble au Québec".

Boulianne works as a translator in the Parliament of Canada.
