= Michel Duguet =

French Scrabble player

Michel Duguet (born 1961) is a French Scrabble player who won the French World Scrabble Championships five times during the 1980s. His record of five world titles has never been broken but has been equaled by Christian Pierre during the 1990s. Despite both players being five-time world champions, it was Duguet that was awarded the prize of 'player of the century' (French: joueur du siècle) at the 2000 World Championship in Paris.

Duguet only played ten seasons of French Scrabble, also winning the French national championship six times, the World Championship by pairs five times and the French championship by pairs twice. Away from Scrabble, he was the Des chiffres et des lettres champion in 1984, a game show based on anagrams and numbers games known as Countdown in the UK. After retiring from Scrabble in 1988, he took up bridge and ended up representing the French national team at the European Bridge championships in 2002, as well as winning the French cup (Coupe de France) of the bridge in 2004 with his wife Marlène. Duguet has occasionally come out of retirement to play Scrabble, finishing 7th at Vichy in 2006, a tournament which welcomes more than 1200 players each year.

Duguet is also an author and has written six books with Michel Charlemagne, another World Scrabble Champion who turned to card games after being World Scrabble Champion.

== Notable achievements ==
=== Scrabble ===
- Five time World Champion: 1982, 1983, 1985, 1987, 1988
- Five times World Champion by pairs: 1982, 1983, 1985, 1986, 1988
- Six time French national champion: 1981, 1982, 1983, 1984, 1985, 1987
- Twice national champion by pairs: 1982, 1987

=== Bridge ===
- 9th place in the European Championship (with Marlène Duguet): 1998
- 2nd place in the European Championship (with Marlène Duguet): 2000
- Winner of the 'Coupe de France' (with Marlène Duguet) : 2004
- Member of the French national bridge team in 2002

== Books ==
- 1998 : Le Scrabble en 10 leçons par Michel Charlemagne and Michel Duguet, editions Minerva (ISBN 283070455X).
- 1998 : Premiers pas au bridge by Michel Charlemagne and Michel Duguet, editions Marabout (ISBN 250103922X).
- 1998 : Jouez au Scrabble avec Michel Duguet, editions Flammarion (ISBN 2082001474).
- 1999 : Le grand livre de tous les jeux de cartes by Michel Charlemagne, Michel Duguet and Jean-Michel Maman (ISBN 2501031903).
- 2003 : Le guide Marabout du bridge by Michel Charlemagne and Michel Duguet, editions Marabout (ISBN 250103922X).
- 2005 : Le grand guide Marabout du bridge by Michel Charlemagne and Michel Duguet, editions Marabout (ISBN 2501043928).

== See also ==
- Contract bridge
- Duplicate Scrabble
- Francophone Scrabble
