= L'Officiel du jeu Scrabble =

French Scrabble dictionary

L'Officiel du jeu Scrabble has been the official dictionary for Francophone Scrabble since January 1, 1990. It is published by Larousse and is often abbreviated to ODS. The current version is ODS 9.

== History ==
- 1990 : Publication of the ODS 1, replacing the Petit Larousse Illustré (PLI), used as a reference by players until then.
- 1994 : Publication of the ODS 2, with 1500 new entries, correcting the few mistakes and omissions of the previous version.
- 1999 : Publication of the ODS 3, with 2000 new entries.
- 2004 : Publication of the ODS 4, with 750 new entries.
- 2008 : Publication of the ODS 5, with 2500 new entries.
- 2012 : Publication of the ODS 6, with 1550 new entries.
- 2016 : Publication of the ODS 7, with 1570 new entries
- 2020 : Publication of the ODS 8, with 1600 new entries
- 2024 : Publication of the ODS 9, with 750 new entries

== Number of words ==
Version	Year	Entries	Words	2	3	4	5	6	7	8	9	10	11	12	13	14	15
ODS 1	1990	56,664	344,001	73	507	2,149	6,776	15,606	28,244	41,982	51,867	54,469	49,469	39,170	27,304	16,862	9,523
ODS 2	1994	58,154	353,526	74	534	2,233	6,984	16,016	28,957	43,115	53,272	55,885	50,802	40,264	28,121	17,428	9,841
ODS 3	1999	60,137	364,370	75	560	2,319	7,184	16,396	29,611	44,109	54,620	57,412	52,357	41,696	29,273	18,309	10,449
ODS 4	2004	60,894	369,085	75	571	2,364	7,277	16,622	29,996	44,664	55,309	58,149	53,026	42,227	29,666	18,550	10,589
ODS 5	2008	63,419	378,989	77	589	2,441	7,483	17,035	30,633	45,642	56,573	59,526	54,442	43,517	30,690	19,279	11,062
ODS 6	2012	64,970	386,264	80	610	2,509	7,645	17,318	31,070	46,329	57,467	60,487	55,436	44,468	31,491	19,892	11,462
ODS 7	2016	66,541	393,670	80	621	2,564	7,823	17,681	31,674	47,159	58,433	61,587	56,463	45,329	32,127	20,358	11,771
ODS 8	2020	68,125	402,325	81	633	2,623	7,980	17,991	32,230	48,039	59,584	62,954	57,784	46,501	32,962	20,886	12,077

A word and its plural form count as a single entry, but as two words.

== New words ==
- ODS1 (1990)
  - 2 letters : BI
  - 3 letters : ADO, ALU, BOG, DAW, GOS, LEM, LOG, LOS, MAO, MOB, NIF, OYE, PEC, POP, REZ, RIO, ROS, ZOB
- ODS2 (1994)
  - 2 letters : EX
  - 3 letters : ASA, BIO, CIF, CUT, FAX, FOG, GÉO, HUN, IBN, IBO, ISO, JAB, KOP, KWA, MAX, MÉO, MIX, MOS, NEM, OLA, OUH, RAC, RAP, TAG, UTE, WOK, YAM
- ODS3 (1999)
  - 2 letters : AA
  - 3 letters : AAS, ADA, CIS, CRÉ, DIN, DOC, FAF, IPÉ, IXA, IXÉ, JAM, KYU, MOA, MOX, NAY, NÉO, NEY, OUD, RAM, SAX, SPA, TAR, TIP, WEB, YUE, ZEF
- ODS4 (2004)
  - 2 letters : none
  - 3 letters : ÉWÉ, HUB, MÉL, PAP, SOM, TAF, TAT, WAD, WAP, ZEC, ZUP
- ODS5 (2008)
  - 2 letters : BA, BÊ
  - 3 letters : AÏD, DOP, DUB, ÉCO, EXO, FAQ, GEX, GUR, KÉA, KRU, MMM, MOR, MUG, OBA, PHÔ, QIN, YET, ZEK
- ODS6 (2012)
  - 2 letters : OM, TO, UD
  - 3 letters : ANI, COM, COX, DAH, DÉO, DZO, FON, KAT, KEN, KET, KOÏ, LED, LUO, NAC, NAN, NIM, SUP, TOF, TOS, UDS, WOH
- ODS7 (2016)
  - 2 letters : none
  - 3 letters : BEU, COT, DEM, EVE, FIU, GIF, LOA, LOL, OIS, OIT, VOC
- ODS8 (2020)
  - 2 letters : QI
  - 3 letters : APP, ARF, BIM, DEJ, DEL, DIP, FIX, GHI, MAG, QIS, RIB, TEF

== Deleted words ==
- ODS2 : DISCUTAILLEE, S (transitive verb), ECLOSAI-T/AIENT (wrong conjugated forms of ECLORE), EINSTENIUM, S (wrong spelling of EINSTEINIUM); GARDIANNEs (wrong spelling of GARDIANE); GEWURTZTRAMINER (wrong spelling of GEWURZTRAMINER); IMMUNOGLOBINE, S (wrong spelling of IMMUNOGLOBULINE); SUISSESSE, S (considered as a proper noun), THEPHILLIM (wrong spelling of TEPHILLIM).
- ODS3 : BAGAGERIE, S (registered trademark); CHAUVISS-AIENT/AIS/AIT/ANT/EZ/ONS (wrong conjugated forms of CHAUVIR); COINTREAU, X (registered trademark); DRELINS (becomes invariable); DRINGS (becomes invariable); PIERRADE, S (registered trademark); REVEUILLI-EZ/ONS et VEUILLI-EZ/ONS (wrong conjugated forms of REVOULOIR); WILLIAMINEs (registered trademark).
- ODS4 : SEPTICOPYOEMIE, S (wrong spelling of SEPTICOPYOHEMIE).
- ODS5 : CAROMS (wrong spelling of CARROM).
- ODS6 : PLACOPLATRE, S (registered trademark).
- ODS7 : AFFICIONADO (wrong spelling of AFICIONADO), ZODIAC, ONGLERIE (registered trademark).
- ODS8 : NEGRO, SILY, CHINETOQUE
