= Nimrod (album) =

Studio album by Green Day
- Released: October 14, 1997
- Recorded: March–July 1997
- Studios: Conway, Hollywood, California
- Genres: Punk rock; pop-punk; alternative rock
- Length: 49:01
- Label: Reprise
- Producers: Rob Cavallo; Green Day

Green Day chronology
Bowling Bowling Bowling Parking Parking (1996)	Nimrod (1997)	Warning (2000)

Green Day studio chronology
Insomniac (1995)	Nimrod (1997)	Warning (2000)

Singles from Nimrod
- 1. "Hitchin' a Ride" Released: September 29, 1997; 2. "Good Riddance (Time of Your Life)" Released: December 2, 1997; 3. "Redundant" Released: April 15, 1998; 4. "Nice Guys Finish Last" Released: March 23, 1999

Nimrod (stylized as nimrod.) is the fifth studio album by the American rock band Green Day, released on October 14, 1997, by Reprise Records. The band began work on the album in the wake of the cancellation of a European tour after the release of their previous album, Insomniac. Recorded at Conway Recording Studios in Los Angeles, the album was written with the intent of creating a set of standalone songs as opposed to a cohesive album. Retrospectively, Nimrod is noted for its musical diversity and experimentation, containing elements of folk, hardcore, surf rock, and ska. Lyrical themes discussed include maturity, personal reflection, and fatherhood.

The album peaked at number 10 on the Billboard U.S. charts and was certified double platinum by the Recording Industry Association of America (RIAA). The record was also certified triple platinum in Australia and double platinum in Canada. Upon release, Nimrod received generally positive reviews from critics, who praised the singer Billie Joe Armstrong's songwriting. The album yielded the acoustic single "Good Riddance (Time of Your Life)", which appeared in numerous popular culture events, including the penultimate episode of the sitcom Seinfeld. To promote the album, Green Day embarked on an extensive touring schedule. The album was also reissued on vinyl on June 16, 2009, as well as for anniversary and deluxe edition releases in 2012, 2017, and 2023.

== Background ==
In 1995, Green Day released Insomniac, which did not perform as well commercially as the band's breakthrough major-label debut Dookie. Speaking of Insomniac, singer and guitarist Billie Joe Armstrong noted, "It did a lot better than I thought it was going to do...From the sound of it, we knew it wasn't going to sell as much as Dookie." The group embarked on an extensive world tour to promote Insomniac in early 1996, which saw the band performing in sports arenas that contrasted with the small clubs the group was accustomed to playing. The members became increasingly uncomfortable with the level of stardom they had attained; Armstrong recalled, "We were becoming the things we hated, playing those big arenas. It was beginning to be not fun anymore."

Green Day also became homesick because touring forced the members to leave behind their families. The band eventually decided to cancel the late 1996 European leg of the Insomniac tour to take time off to spend at home. During this time, the band continued to write, and eventually completed over three dozen new songs by the beginning of 1997. Although the group's last effort with the producer Rob Cavallo was considered a disappointment, the band did not contemplate choosing anyone else to work with on Nimrod, because the members viewed Cavallo as a "mentor".

== Recording and production ==
"This is a record we've been thinking about for the past six years. We knew we wanted to change, but we didn't want to change too much too soon. The record's about vulnerability in a lot of ways—throwing yourself out there...Why the fuck not put out that fucking stupid acoustic song or that stupid surf song? This is who we are. Why hide it?"

— Billie Joe Armstrong, November 1997

The album was recorded at Conway Recording Studios in Los Angeles, and the band stayed at the Sunset Marquis Hotel during the sessions. Nimrod took four months to record; Armstrong partially attributed the lengthy recording time to spending "a little too much time" playing pool and foosball during the sessions. The recording schedule, which lasted from noon to two in the morning every day, became frustrating for the group members, who began drinking heavily. The bassist Mike Dirnt recalled, "One night one of us was walking down the halls knocking on people's doors while naked." Another incident involved the drummer Tre Cool throwing his hotel room television set out of his window. Armstrong noted, "There was a lot of glass. You have to live that arrogant lifestyle every now and then." To keep the band focused, Cavallo enlisted his father, Pat Magnarella, to supervise and manage the group.

While working on Nimrod, Green Day explained to Cavallo their desire to create a more experimental album because the band had grown tired of its traditional three chord song structure. Armstrong drew inspiration from the Clash's London Calling, and referred to Nimrod as "the record I've wanted to make since the band started." The album was intended to break the constraints of typical punk rock music. To preserve the quality of his songwriting, Armstrong began by writing each song on an acoustic guitar, to which the rest of the band would later add heavier instrumentation and faster tempos. Green Day recorded around 30 songs for Nimrod and picked 18 of them for the record. Dirnt explained that the recording was much more loosely structured than previous albums, and that creating songs was the focus as opposed to making a cohesive record. He observed, "We've always screwed around with different types of music during our jams, but we'd say, 'OK let's stop and get back to the album.' This time we just let them come up."

The Reprise Records president Howie Klein spent a lot of time in the studio with the band during recording, and recalled that, "What I realized immediately is that they had seemed to mature in their musical direction. It wasn't just more of the same. There was so much growth in the band." The musical maturation displayed on Nimrod was partially inspired by Bikini Kill's Reject All American (1996), which encouraged Armstrong to balance "rough punk rock songs" and "delicate pretty songs". Armstrong wrote "Good Riddance (Time of Your Life)" in 1993 and showed the song to his bandmates during the Dookie recording sessions. During the sessions, the song was determined to be too different from the rest of the songs on Dookie, and Rob Cavallo was unsure of how to structure the recording. When the time came to record Nimrod, Armstrong decided to use the song, and Cavallo suggested they add strings to the track. He sent the band to play foosball in another room while he recorded the strings, which took "like fifteen, twenty minutes, maybe a half an hour at the most". Cavallo reflected on his decision to add the strings "I knew we had done the right thing. I knew it was a hit the second I heard it."

In addition to the strings on "Good Riddance (Time of Your Life)", the music of Nimrod contains a variety of other instruments that were not featured on previous Green Day albums. "Walking Alone" features Armstrong playing the harmonica, despite the fact that he "did not know how to play it at all". "Hitchin' a Ride" opens with a Middle Eastern-inspired violin performed by Petra Haden of That Dog. The band invited Gabrial McNair and Stephen Bradley of No Doubt's horn section to play on the ska-influenced "King for a Day".

== Composition ==
=== Music ===
"King for a Day"
This ska-influenced song contains a horn section and has been compared to an "Oi! anthem" by Armstrong.

"Good Riddance (Time of Your Life)"
This track consists solely of vocals, guitar, and strings. The song has been referred to as a "pop-punk campfire singalong ballad" and differs from the band's more abrasive punk rock roots.

Nimrod is more musically diverse than previous Green Day albums. Armstrong noted that with the album, Green Day went down "different avenues", adding: "Each song has its own character and identity so we wanted to be able to bring that out as much as possible." "Nice Guys Finish Last" has been considered a song that "eases the transition" from Insomniac to Nimrod. Sandy Masuo of the Los Angeles Times likened "Worry Rock" to the music of Elvis Costello. "Good Riddance (Time of Your Life)" has been referred to as a "pop-punk campfire singalong ballad". After opening with Haden's violin solo, "Hitchin' a Ride" evolves into a bass-driven rock and roll song with a "Stray Cats vibe". Cool referred to "Take Back" (considered upfront hardcore punk, both musically and vocally) and "Platypus (I Hate You)" as "some of the most punk songs we've ever done". "Last Ride In" is a surf rock-influenced instrumental, and "King for a Day" is a song featuring a horn section. Armstrong compared the song to the Oi! genre, and noted, "It would be funny for a bunch of macho fraternity guys to be singing along and, little do they know, the song's about being in drag." The "chiming" guitar riffs of "Redundant" have been compared to those of the Byrds. Overall, Nimrod is considered a punk rock, pop-punk, and alternative rock album. Additionally, Loudwire categorized the album as representing scene music.

=== Lyrics ===
Lyrically, Nimrod touches upon more reflective themes not present on earlier Green Day albums. Much of the album illustrates Armstrong's sentiments on growing up and his role as a husband and father. "The Grouch" centers on Armstrong's fears of "wasting away, getting fat, becoming impotent, and losing his ideals". On "Walking Alone", he reflects on old friends from his childhood, and notes that he is "too drunk to figure out they're fading away". Armstrong discusses the struggle to stay sober on "Hitchin' a Ride". "Good Riddance (Time of Your Life)" was inspired by Armstrong's failed relationship with a woman that ended when she joined the Peace Corps in 1993. The same woman is also the subject of "She" from Dookie, "Whatsername" from American Idiot (2004) and "Amanda" from ¡Tré!. "Redundant" focuses on Armstrong's relationship with his wife and how "things sometime [sic] get repetitive and you have to make an effort to recapture the early spontaneity", whilst "Worry Rock" deals with the "vicious fights" between them.

However, other songs contain subject matter and themes more typical of Green Day's previous work. Armstrong wrote "Nice Guys Finish Last" about the band's interactions with the band's lawyers and managers and how "everybody thinks they know what's best for you." "Jinx" contains self-deprecating lyrics characteristic of many of the band's songs, while "Prosthetic Head" has been referred to as a "typical ticked-off kiss-off". Armstrong described "Platypus (I Hate You)" as "a vicious song about wanting to strangle someone I have deep animosity for, and the pleasure of watching this person die." Likewise, "Take Back" is about "revenge and hurting someone when they least expect it". "King for a Day" tells the story of a cross-dresser. "Uptight" is about depression, and contains repeated mentions of suicide; Armstrong explained, "I think the word 'suicide' just sounded really good. And the line, 'I'm a son of a gun'. It made sense, but I can't really explain why it made sense. It just sort of does." "Reject", which takes its name from the Bikini Kill song "Reject All American", addresses questions towards Green Day's credibility within the punk rock scene, "and how we've moved on and are telling everyone who worries about such shit to fuck off."

== Album title and artwork ==
The album's title, Nimrod, is the name of a character from the Bible that was a hunter. In American English, it became a term for a stupid or dimwitted person as the usage is often said to have been popularized by the Looney Tunes cartoon character Bugs Bunny sarcastically referring to the hunter Elmer Fudd as "nimrod".

After three art directors were rejected by the band and pressing was behind schedule, Green Day asked the help of Chris Bilheimer, a friend of Armstrong who had done covers for another group signed by Warner Bros. Records, R.E.M. Having just the album title to work on, Bilheimer had some ideas, with one taking inspiration from a photo Bilheimer had seen, where a politician's poster had his face removed. He felt the image was "striking" and seemed to fit the band by featuring "a typical middle-age male, corporate politician American kind of guy, and someone had completely taken his identity away through vandalism." Following that line of thought, Bilheimer took an encyclopedia picture of men in suits and ties and put colored circles reading "nimrod." on their faces, "using that to take away the people's identity". The back cover had the same being done to a yearbook Bilheimer found in a Los Angeles bookstore, "from the era of the Leave It to Beaver 1950s idyllic America", with the label "break[ing] down that image of people’s perceptions of a happy polite idyllic society." The booklet features the lyrics presented as if they were a secret document that had been redacted with black ink, "so they seemed like they were part of something else".

On August 26, 2023, Green Day announced limited edition T-shirts with a parody of Nimrod's album cover, replacing the portraits obscured behind the circles with a mug shot of Donald Trump. The band promised to donate the merchandise proceeds to Greater Good Music, a charity helping victims of the Maui fire.

In the back cover, among the yearbook photos, Billie Joe Armstrong, Tre Cool, and Mike Dirnt are seen on the top left, third right top, and bottom right, respectively.

== Release and promotion ==
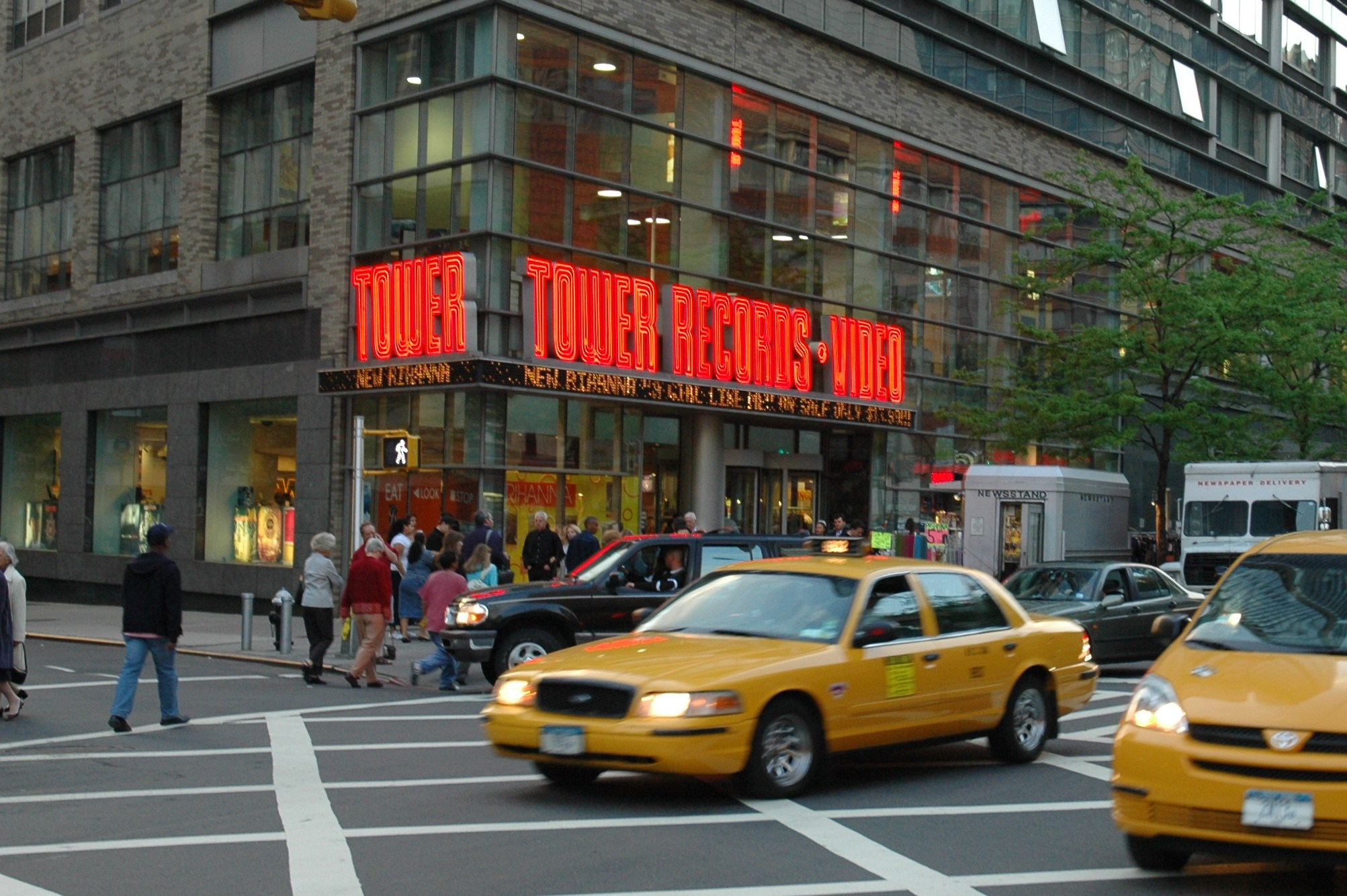
The band's first promotional appearance for the release of Nimrod took place at the Tower Records store in Manhattan; the performance escalated into a riot.

The Nimrod promotional tour began that fall and opened with a performance and in-store record signing on November 11, 1997, at a Tower Records in Manhattan. The band was upset upon reading reviews that suggested the band had lost its punk edge, and despite the presence of security staff both inside and outside the building, started a riot during its scheduled eight-song set at the store. Armstrong then wrote the words "fuck" and "nimrod" in black spray paint on the storefront windows, and proceeded to moon the audience of approximately 1,400 people. After the riot settled down, Cool threw his bass drum into the crowd while Armstrong attempted the same with a monitor, which was wrestled away from him by a store manager. No charges were filed and no injuries were reported, but the store was closed for the day to repair damages caused.

On the tour in promotion of the album, Green Day aimed for simplicity and decided not to bring new instrumentalists to play for the new songs. Armstrong commented, "Right now we're refraining from pulling out a lot of that 'Nimrod' stuff. We want to make things small. We don't want to bring a horn section or a violin player out with us. A lot of people want to hear the old stuff, and that stuff is still just as significant to us." The band also decided to play small theaters instead of stadiums and festivals, as Armstrong explained that they felt better to "go to a place like the Fillmore and the Warfield and know it's actually going to sell out" instead of playing to half-empty large venues. The Nimrod tour marked the first time the band performed its now-routine ritual of inviting audience members onstage to play instruments. During the tour, Armstrong felt that he became a better performer, noting, "I think some people walk away from a Green Day concert with the emotions you would get from some kind of theater performance where the crowd feels involved — where it's not just about the singer. It's not just about the band."

While performing at the 1998 KROQ Weenie Roast in Irvine, California, the Third Eye Blind bassist Arion Salazar ran onstage and "bear-hugged" Dirnt, who was caught off-guard. The incident escalated into an on-stage scuffle before Salazar was taken away by security. After the performance, Dirnt confronted Salazar backstage, and as the two were arguing, a beer bottle struck Dirnt in the head, causing a small fracture in his skull. Eyewitnesses later attributed the bottle throwing to a fan of Third Eye Blind. Salazar and the band's management soon released a statement: "I am sorry that my attempt at doing something I thought would be funny escalated into Mike getting hurt. That was never my intention. I simply had too much to drink and made a very bad decision. If I had been in Mike's place, I am sure I would have acted similarly. My heart goes out to him and I hope he recovers quickly."

"Good Riddance (Time of Your Life)" appeared in numerous events of popular culture, including a scene involving the death of a cancer patient on the medical drama ER, the series finale of the sitcom Seinfeld in 1998, and an X-Men blooper reel during the credits sequence of the 2024 MCU film Deadpool & Wolverine.

=== 25th Anniversary Edition ===
On October 13, 2022, the band announced they would be releasing an expanded version of Nimrod for its 25th anniversary, and released a demo of the song "You Irritate Me", which was cut from the original release. The expanded version includes over 30 bonus tracks on 2 discs, including other demos and live versions of some of their singles, and also includes remastered versions of the original album's songs. Prior to the January 27, 2023, release, the band also released a second demo; a cover of Elvis Costello's "Alison" on January 13, 2023. Upon release of the anniversary edition, many critics and fans noted that the demo "Black Eyeliner" was repurposed by Armstrong for two different songs later in his career. The pre-chorus was used for "Church on Sunday" on Green Day's next album, Warning, while the chord progression and lyrical construction were used for "Kill Your Friends", a song by Armstrong's 2018 side project, the Longshot.

== Reception ==
=== Critical response ===
Professional ratings
Review scores
Source	Rating
AllMusic	3.5/5 stars
Alternative Press	4.5/5 stars
Chicago Tribune	3/4 stars
Entertainment Weekly	B−
Los Angeles Times	3/4 stars
NME	5/10
Pitchfork	7.0/10
Rolling Stone	3.5/5 stars
The Rolling Stone Album Guide	4/5 stars
Spin	6/10

The album received generally positive reviews from critics. Stephen Thomas Erlewine of AllMusic gave Nimrod three and a half stars out of five, calling it an "invigorating, if occasionally frustrating listen", and although he praised Armstrong's "gift for hooky, instantly memorable melodies", he noted that "the 18 tracks whip by at such a breakneck speed that it leaves you somewhat dazed." Greg Kot from Rolling Stone enjoyed the album's melodic nature as well as the "measure of sincerity" present in Armstrong's vocals. Kot appreciated the return of the band's "juvenile sense of humor" that he felt was lacking on Insomniac, and praised the musical diversity on the record, remarking, "This music is a long way from Green Day's apprenticeship at the Gilman Street punk clubs, in Berkeley, Calif. But now that the band has seen the world, it's only fitting that Green Day should finally make an album that sounds as if it has."

A group of editors writing for People also praised the record's "fresh and original" melodies and "quick-tempoed cool", adding, "Kudos to Green Day, young punk's reigning purists, for sticking with what they know best." The Los Angeles Times's Sandy Masuo enjoyed the "mature songwriting that really makes this album tick", noting that "Naturally, a couple of thrash 'n' bash hard-core paeans are included, but they're surrounded by songs that are surprisingly varied in character and grounded in a pop aesthetic that evokes a gaggle of great tunesmiths." Stephen Thompson of The A.V. Club wrote, "If Green Day still has a loyal following, its fans are bound to find something to like on Nimrod; for all the attempts at diversity, the record is packed with mile-wide hooks and sing-along anthems."

=== Commercial performance ===
Nimrod debuted at number 10 on the Billboard 200, selling 81,000 copies in its first week of release, and remained on the chart for 70 weeks. On March 16, 2000, Nimrod was certified double platinum by the Recording Industry Association of America (RIAA) for shipments of over two million copies. In Canada, the album peaked at number four, remaining on the chart for four weeks. On July 6, 1998, the record was certified double platinum by the Canadian Recording Industry Association for shipments of over 200,000 copies. In Australia, the album debuted at number 12 and later peaked at number three on the country's chart. The record was later certified triple platinum in Australia.

== Track listing ==
All lyrics are written by Billie Joe Armstrong; all music is composed by Green Day.

No.	Title	Length
1.	"Nice Guys Finish Last"	2:49
2.	"Hitchin' a Ride"	2:51
3.	"The Grouch"	2:12
4.	"Redundant"	3:17
5.	"Scattered"	3:02
6.	"All the Time"	2:10
7.	"Worry Rock"	2:27
8.	"Platypus (I Hate You)"	2:21
9.	"Uptight"	3:04
10.	"Last Ride In" (instrumental)	3:47
11.	"Jinx"	2:12
12.	"Haushinka"	3:25
13.	"Walking Alone"	2:45
14.	"Reject"	2:05
15.	"Take Back"	1:09
16.	"King for a Day"	3:13
17.	"Good Riddance (Time of Your Life)"	2:34
18.	"Prosthetic Head"	3:38
Total length:		49:01

Japanese version bonus track
No.	Title	Length
19.	"Desensitized"	2:49
Total length:		51:50

Australian version bonus tracks
No.	Title	Length
19.	"Suffocate"	2:54
20.	"Do Da Da"	1:30
21.	"Desensitized"	2:49
22.	"You Lied"	2:26
Total length:		58:40

=== 25th Anniversary Edition ===
25th Anniversary Edition LP3: Demos
No.	Title	Length
1.	"Nice Guys Finish Last"	2:53
2.	"Place Inside My Head"	2:33
3.	"The Grouch"	2:09
4.	"Walking Alone"	2:33
5.	"Jinx"	1:51
6.	"Alison" (Elvis Costello cover)	2:35
7.	"Espionage" (instrumental)	3:16
8.	"You Irritate Me"	1:36
9.	"Tre Polka"	2:40
10.	"When It's Time"	2:22
11.	"Desensitized"	2:27
12.	"Chain Saw" (The Ramones cover)	1:33
13.	"Reject"	2:05
14.	"Black Eyeliner" ( (Note: Demo for Church on Sunday and Kill Your Friends The Longshot))	3:14
Total length:		33:47

25th Anniversary Edition LP4: Live at the Electric Factory 11/14/97 (Side A/B)
No.	Title	Length
1.	"Going to Pasalacqua" (live)	4:13
2.	"Welcome to Paradise" (live)	4:12
3.	"Geek Stink Breath" (live)	2:38
4.	"Nice Guys Finish Last" (live)	2:54
5.	"Hitchin' a Ride" (live)	4:17
6.	"The Grouch" (live)	3:13
7.	"Chump" (live)	2:41
8.	"Longview" (live)	3:36
9.	"2000 Light Years Away" (live)	6:06
10.	"Brain Stew" (live)	3:15

25th Anniversary Edition LP5: Live at the Electric Factory 11/14/97 (Side C/D)
No.	Title	Length
11.	"Jaded" (live)	2:26
12.	"Knowledge" (Operation Ivy cover; live)	6:08
13.	"Basket Case" (live)	2:48
14.	"She" (live)	2:34
15.	"F.O.D." (live)	2:39
16.	"Paper Lanterns" (live)	9:54
17.	"Scattered" (live)	3:19
18.	"Prosthetic Head" (live)	4:05
19.	"When I Come Around" (live)	3:22
20.	"Good Riddance" (live)	2:09
Total length:		76:09

== Personnel ==
Adapted from Nimrod CD booklet.

Green Day

- Billie Joe Armstrong – vocals, guitar, harmonica
- Mike Dirnt – bass, vocals; baseball bat on "Desensitized"
- Tré Cool – drums, bongos, tambourine

Additional musicians

- Petra Haden – violin on "Hitchin' a Ride" and "Last Ride In"
- Conan McCallum – violin on "Good Riddance (Time of Your Life)"
- Gabrial McNair, Stephen Bradley – horns on "Last Ride In" and "King For A Day"
- David Campbell – string and horn arrangements

Production

- Rob Cavallo; Green Day – producers
- Ken Allardyce – recording, engineer
- Tony Flores – second engineer
- Mike Dy, Barry Goldberg, Bill Kinsley, Wes Seidman – additional second engineers
- Chris Lord-Alge – mixing
- Timmy Chunks – guitar technician
- Bill Schneider – bass technician

Artwork

- Snorri Brothers – photography
- Chris Bilheimer – photography, art direction, design

== Charts ==
=== Weekly charts ===
Weekly chart performance for Nimrod
Chart (1997–1999)	Peak position
Australian Albums (ARIA)	3
Austrian Albums (Ö3 Austria)	28
Canadian Albums (Billboard)	4
Dutch Albums (Album Top 100)	80
Finnish Albums (Suomen virallinen lista)	40
French Albums (SNEP)	43
German Albums (Offizielle Top 100)	31
Italian Albums (FIMI)	15
Japanese Albums (Oricon)	7
New Zealand Albums (RMNZ)	22
Scottish Albums (Official Charts)	13
Spanish Albums (AFYVE)	28
Swedish Albums (Sverigetopplistan)	36
Swiss Albums (Schweizer Hitparade)	33
UK Albums (Official Charts)	11
US Billboard 200	10

2023 weekly chart performance for Nimrod
Chart (2023)	Peak position
Belgian Albums (Ultratop Wallonia)	183

=== Year-end charts ===
1997 year-end chart performance for Nimrod
Chart (1997)	Position
Canadian Albums (Nielsen Soundscan)	89

1998 year-end chart performance for Nimrod
Chart (1998)	Position
Australian Albums (ARIA)	56
Canadian Albums (RPM)	77
US Billboard 200	75

1999 year-end chart performance for Nimrod
Chart (1999)	Position
Australian Albums (ARIA)	84

== Certifications ==
Certifications and sales for Nimrod
Region	Certification	Certified units/sales
Australia (ARIA)	3× Platinum	210,000^{^}
Brazil (Pro-Música Brasil)	Gold	100,000^{*}
Canada (Music Canada)	4× Platinum	400,000^{‡}
Japan (RIAJ)	Platinum	200,000^{^}
New Zealand (RMNZ)	Gold	7,500^{‡}
Spain (Promusicae)	Gold	50,000^{^}
United Kingdom (BPI)	Platinum	300,000^{^}
United States (RIAA)	2× Platinum	2,000,000^{^}
^{*} Sales figures based on certification alone.^{^} Shipments figures based on certification alone.^{‡} Sales+streaming figures based on certification alone.
