= Christian Pierre =

Belgian Scrabble player (born 1959)

Christian Pierre (born 1959) is a Belgian Scrabble player who has won the French World Scrabble Championships five times, equalling the record of Michel Duguet who won the competition five times in the 1980s while Pierre won all five of his titles in the 1990s. When the international Scrabble ratings were updated in July 2007, Pierre was ranked 2nd out of around 21,000 rated players, and the highest ranked Belgian player. Pierre is the current Belgian national champion in French (there's also a championship in Dutch) and has won the national championship 14 times in 22 years. Since 1973, the Belgian national championship has taken place 36 times, Pierre has won about 39% of all the championships.

== Notable achievements ==
- Five times World Champion: 1991, 1992, 1994, 1996, 1998
- World Champion by pairs (with Jean-Piere Hellebaut): 1991
- Belgian national champion 15 times: 1987, 1988, 1990, 1991, 1992, 1993, 1994, 1996, 2000, 2001, 2002, 2004, 2007, 2008, 2009

== See also ==
- Duplicate Scrabble
- Francophone Scrabble
