= Francophone Scrabble =

Variation of Scrabble in French

French Scrabble letter distribution (Number of tiles across, point values down)
	×1	×2	×3	×5	×6	×8	×9	×15
0		[blank]						
1				L	N O R S T U	I	A	E
2		G	D M					
3		B C P						
4		F H V						
8	J Q							
10	K W X Y Z							

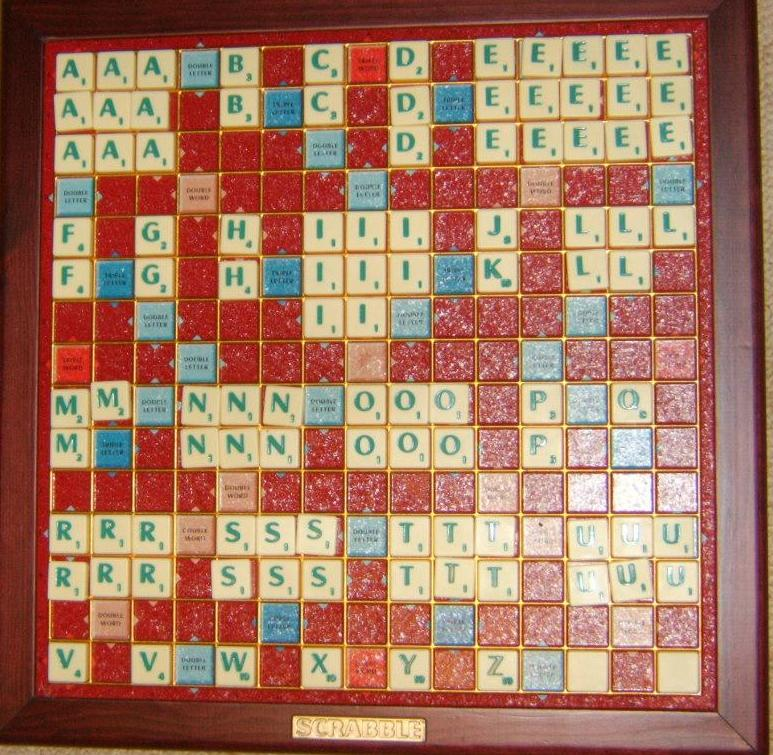
A complete French Scrabble set

Francophone Scrabble is Scrabble in the French language. The governing body, the Fédération internationale de Scrabble francophone, has more than 20,000 members. Just as in English, points are scored by playing valid words from the lettered tiles. In French there are 102 tiles, 100 lettered tiles and two blanks known as jokers. The official word list for Francophone Scrabble is L'Officiel du jeu Scrabble.

== Forms of play ==
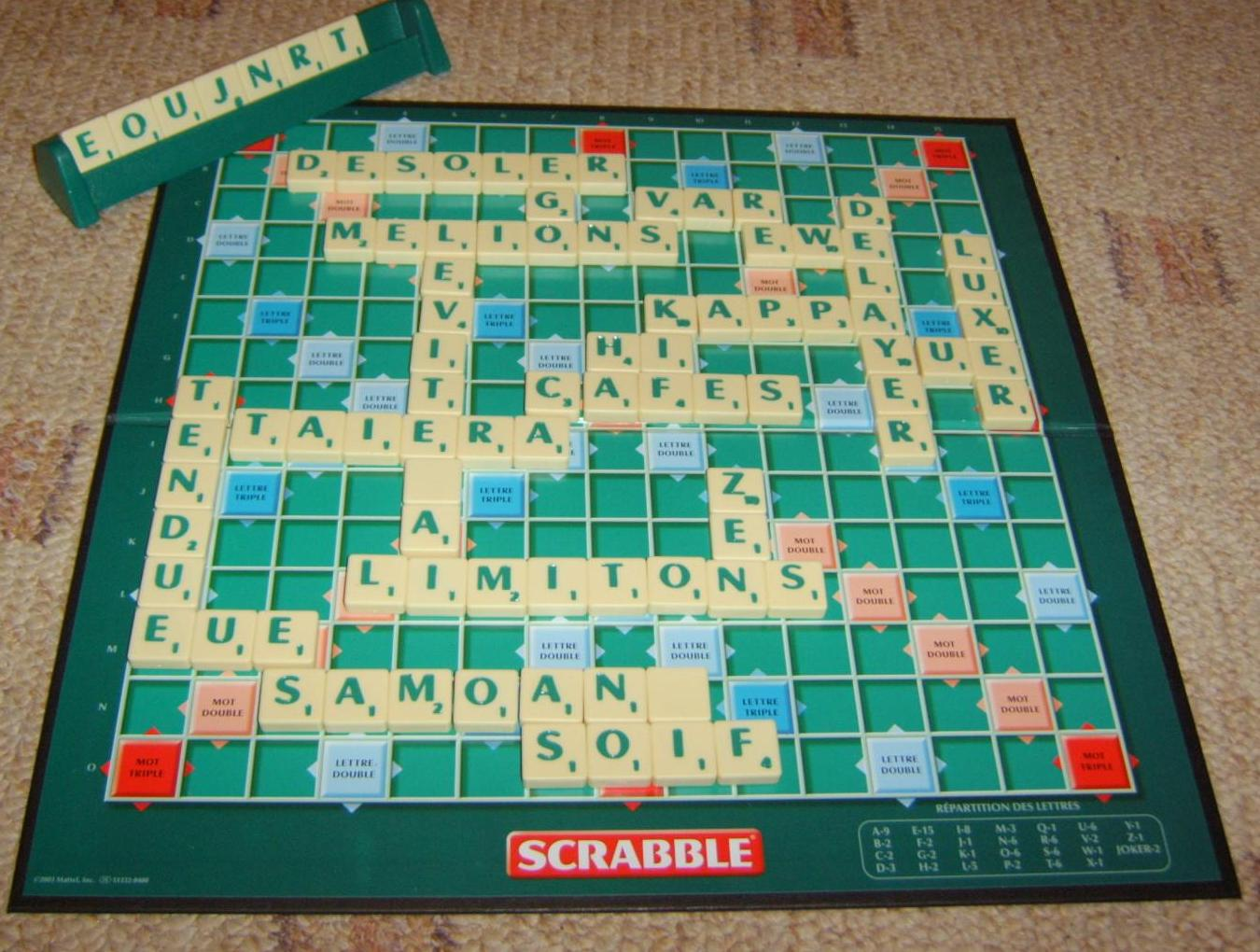
A completed game in French

There are two forms of competition Scrabble in French. Scrabble classique, also known as partie libre, is match play, as in the English-language game. Duplicate Scrabble is an alternative form of the game where all players have the same letters and board in front of them, and play against the theoretical top score.

=== Duplicate ===
An arbiter is used to choose the letters for the game. He draws seven tiles at random to start the game and announces them; the players draw the same seven tiles and the arbiter starts the clock. After the allotted time period, the arbiter stops the clock and the players must submit their solutions to the nearest official. The highest scoring word (known as the top) is announced and placed on the display board by the arbiter, and the players do the same. At the end of the game, the arbiter announces the top - the total score of all the moves, which is the theoretical high score which cannot be beaten. The winner of the game can be expressed in three different ways. Points scored, points dropped compared to the top, or percentage.

Rules of duplicate:

- The highest scoring word must be placed on the board after each move. However if there is more than one word which have the same score, the arbiter chooses the word which is most apt for opening the board up.
- It is possible to score more than 100% by benefitting from a solo top. A solo top is when only one player finds the top play, and is awarded a bonus of 10 points which is added to his total score at the end of the game.
- Any invalid word is known as a zéro and means what it implies - the player gets zero points for that move
- There must be at least one vowel and one consonant in each rack, or else the letters are put back in the bag and redrawn until the rack meets these criteria. If no more vowels or no more consonants remain, the game ends with the final score as it stands at that moment. Both the letter Y and the blank are counted as both a vowel and a consonant.

== The World Championship ==
The French Language World Championship or le championnat du monde de Scrabble francophone uses the duplicate format and has been held every year since 1972. Two players have won the World Championship five times; Michel Duguet and Christian Pierre. The current World Champion (2007) is Antonin Michel of France. The elite competition is limited to qualifiers who compete in their national championships. Although around 270 take place every year, this is a relatively small field compared to tournaments where more than 1000 people compete. Most other tournaments are open to all members of the international federation.

At The French World Championships, more than one title is distributed. There are 5 age categories; cadet (younger than 16) junior (16-18), senior (all players) vermeil (60-69) and diamant (70+). There is an official winner of each age category with the winner of the senior category being the overall world champion. There are also multiple tournaments; duplicate, duplicate pairs, duplicate blitz (60 seconds per move) and a matchplay Scrabble world cup. The match play Scrabble world cup event was introduced in 2006, won by Parfait Mouanda of the Republic of the Congo. The competition was played over 3 days and 12 games, with the two finalists playing a best of three series to decide a winner.

The 2007 championship was won by Amar Diokh of Senegal who beat Frenchman Edouard Lebeau two games to nil in the final. The tournament was played over 14 games with a best of three final on the final day.

== Notable players ==
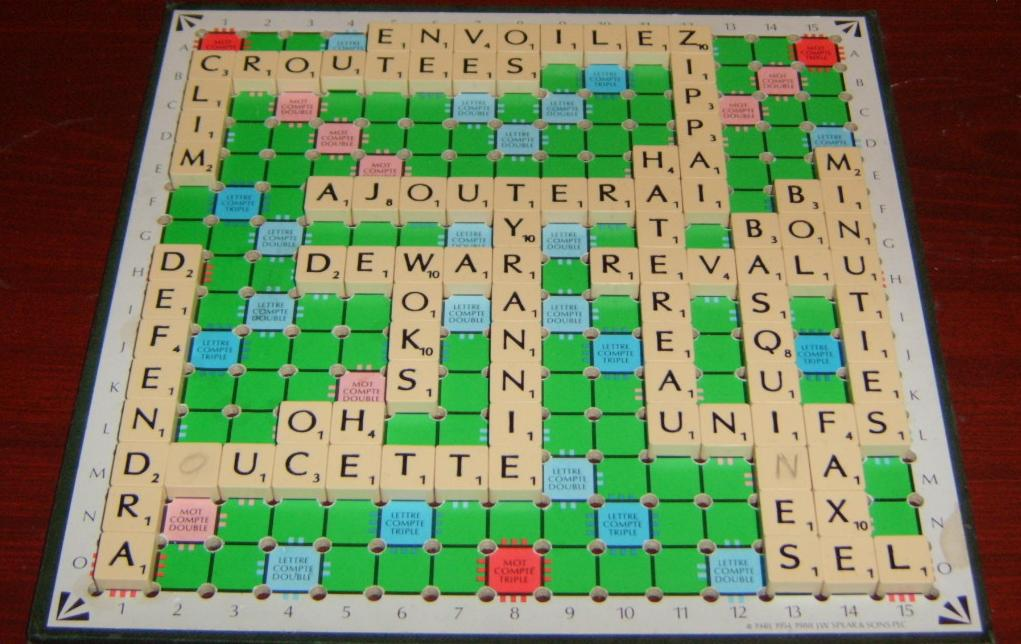
Example of a finished French duplicate game

Eight players have won the individual duplicate world title more than once:

- Marc Selis Belgium (1974, 1976)
- Benjamin Hannuna France (1979, 1984)
- Michel Duguet France (1982, 1983, 1985, 1987, 1988)
- Christian Pierre Belgium (1991, 1992, 1994, 1996, 1998)
- Emmanuel Rivalan France (1993, 1999)
- Jean-Pierre Hellebaut Switzerland (2002, 2003)
- Antonin Michel France (2005, 2007)
- Nigel Richards New Zealand (2017, 2018, 2019)

The records for the most wins at the following championships are

- Blitz world championship: Antonin Michel France (4 wins)
- Pairs world championship: Michel Duguet France (5 wins)
- French national championship
  - French duplicate championship: Michel Duguet France (6 wins)
  - French matchplay championship: Pierre Olivier-Georget France (3 wins)
  - French duplicate blitz championship: Antonin Michel France (5 wins)
  - French duplicate pairs championship: Jean-François Lachaud France (5 wins)
- Belgian national championship: Christian Pierre Belgium (14 wins)
- Swiss national championship: Véronique Keim Switzerland (5 wins)
- Tunisian national championship: Abderrazak Ouarda Tunisia (14 wins)
- Quebec national championship: Germain Boulianne (8 wins)

At least five competitors from the Francophone championship have competed in the English language World Scrabble Championship; Antonin Michel, Hervé Bohbot, Dan Laurentiu Sandu, Robert Springer, and Nigel Richards.
