= World Scrabble Championships =

The World Scrabble Championships are annual or semiannual events in which competitors vie to win Scrabble matches in languages specific to the championship.

These include:

- The English World Scrabble Championship which has taken place every two years since 1991
- The Spanish World Scrabble Championship which has taken place every year since 1997
- The French World Scrabble Championships which have taken place every year since 1972
- The Catalan World Scrabble Championship which has taken place every two years since 2005
