= Tautological =

In mathematics, tautological may refer to:

Logic:

- Tautological consequence

Geometry, where it is used as an alternative to canonical:

- Tautological bundle
- Tautological one-form
- Tautology (grammar), unnecessary repetition, or more words than necessary, to say the same thing.

== See also ==
- Tautology (disambiguation)
- List of tautological place names
