= Copy =

Copy may refer to:

- Copying or the product of copying (including the plural "copies"); the duplication of information or an artifact
  - Cut, copy and paste, a method of reproducing text or other data in computing
  - File copying
  - Photocopying, a process which makes paper copies of documents and other visual images
  - Fax, a telecommunications technology used to transfer facsimile copies of documents, especially over the telephone network
  - Facsimile, a copy or reproduction that is as true to the original source as possible
  - Replica, a copy closely resembling the original concerning its shape and appearance
  - Term of art in U.S. copyright law meaning a material object in which a work of authorship has been embodied, such as a book
- Copy (command), a shell command on DOS and Windows systems
- Copy (publishing), written content in publications, in contrast to photographs or other elements of layout.
  - The output of journalists and authors, ready for copy editing and typesetting
  - The output of copywriters, who are employed to write material which encourages consumers to buy goods or services.
  - Camera ready copy, term used in the commercial printing industry meaning that a document is, from a technical standpoint, ready to "go to press", or be printed.
- Copy (album), the debut album of the electronica artist Mitsuki Aira
- Copy (musician), the Portland-based electronic music artist
- "Copy", a procedure word or response indicating a satisfactory receipt of the last radio transmission
- COPY, a COBOL keyword

== See also ==
- Copy and paste (disambiguation)
- Copyist
- Copyright
- Copy editing
- Duplication (disambiguation)
