= Hitchin' a Ride (Green Day song) =

1997 single by Green Day

"Hitchin'a Ride"

Single by Green Day

from the album Nimrod
- B-side: "Sick of Me"; "Espionage"
- Released: September 29, 1997
- Studio: Conway (Hollywood, California)
- Genre: Rock and roll; rockabilly; alternative rock; grunge
- Length: 2:51
- Label: Reprise
- Composer: Green Day
- Lyricist: Billie Joe Armstrong
- Producers: Rob Cavallo; Green Day

Green Day singles chronology
"Brain Stew" / "Jaded" (1996)	"Hitchin'a Ride" (1997)	"Good Riddance (Time of Your Life)" (1997)

Music video
- "Hitchin'a Ride" on YouTube

"Hitchin'a Ride" is a song by American rock band Green Day. It was released in September 1997 as the first single from their fifth album, Nimrod, and is the second track on the album. The single reached number five on the US Billboard Modern Rock Tracks chart, number nine on the Billboard Mainstream Rock Tracks chart, and number 25 on the UK Singles Chart.

The song was later featured as the fourteenth track on their International Superhits! (2001) and as the eighth track off of God's Favorite Band (2017).

== Reception ==
PopMatters listed "Hitchin' a Ride" as the sixth best Green Day song, citing "Suiting its falling-off-the-wagon subject matter, 'Hitchin’ a Ride' is a hellish yet exhilarating track that makes picking up a bottle look like probably not wisest idea one could have."

== Music video ==
The music video for "Hitchin' a Ride", directed by Mark Kohr, premiered on MTV on October 16, 1997. Coherently with the subject of the song, the music video shows the band performing in a scenery reminiscent of Prohibition era, amongst suggestive characters in costumes.

"Hitchin' a Ride" can also be found on International Superhits!, Bullet in a Bible and Greatest Hits: God's Favorite Band. The music video is included on International Supervideos!.

== Track listings ==
1. "Hitchin' a Ride"
2. "Sick of Me" (non-LP track)
3. "Espionage" (non-LP track)

LP box set

A-side:

1. "Hitchin' a Ride"
2. "Good Riddance (Time of Your Life)"

B-side:

1. "Scattered"
2. "Uptight"

== Charts ==
=== Weekly charts ===
Weekly chart performance for "Hitchin' a Ride"
Chart (1997)	Peak position
Australia (ARIA)	26
Canada Top Singles (RPM)	23
Canada Rock/Alternative (RPM)	1
Scottish Singles Sales (Official Charts)	22
UK Singles (Official Charts)	25
UK Rock & Metal (Official Charts)	1
US Radio Songs (Billboard)	59
US Alternative Airplay (Billboard)	5
US Mainstream Rock Airplay (Billboard)	9

=== Year-end charts ===
1997 year-end chart performance for "Hitchin' a Ride"
Chart (1997)	Position
US Mainstream Rock Tracks (Billboard)	55
US Modern Rock Tracks (Billboard)	45

1998 year-end chart performance for "Hitchin' a Ride"
Chart (1998)	Position
US Modern Rock Tracks (Billboard)	88

== Certifications ==
Certifications and sales for "Hitchin' a Ride"
Region	Certification	Certified units/sales
Canada (Music Canada)	Gold	40,000^{‡}
^{‡} Sales+streaming figures based on certification alone.

== Release history ==
Release dates and formats for "Hitchin' a Ride"
Region	Date	Format(s)	Label(s)	Ref.
United States	August 1997	Radio	Reprise	
United Kingdom	September 29, 1997	CD; cassette	Reprise	
Japan	October 15, 1997	CD	Reprise	

== See also ==
- List of RPM Rock/Alternative number-one singles (Canada)
