= DuPage Theatre and DuPage Shoppes =

- Formerly listed on the U.S. National Register of Historic Places
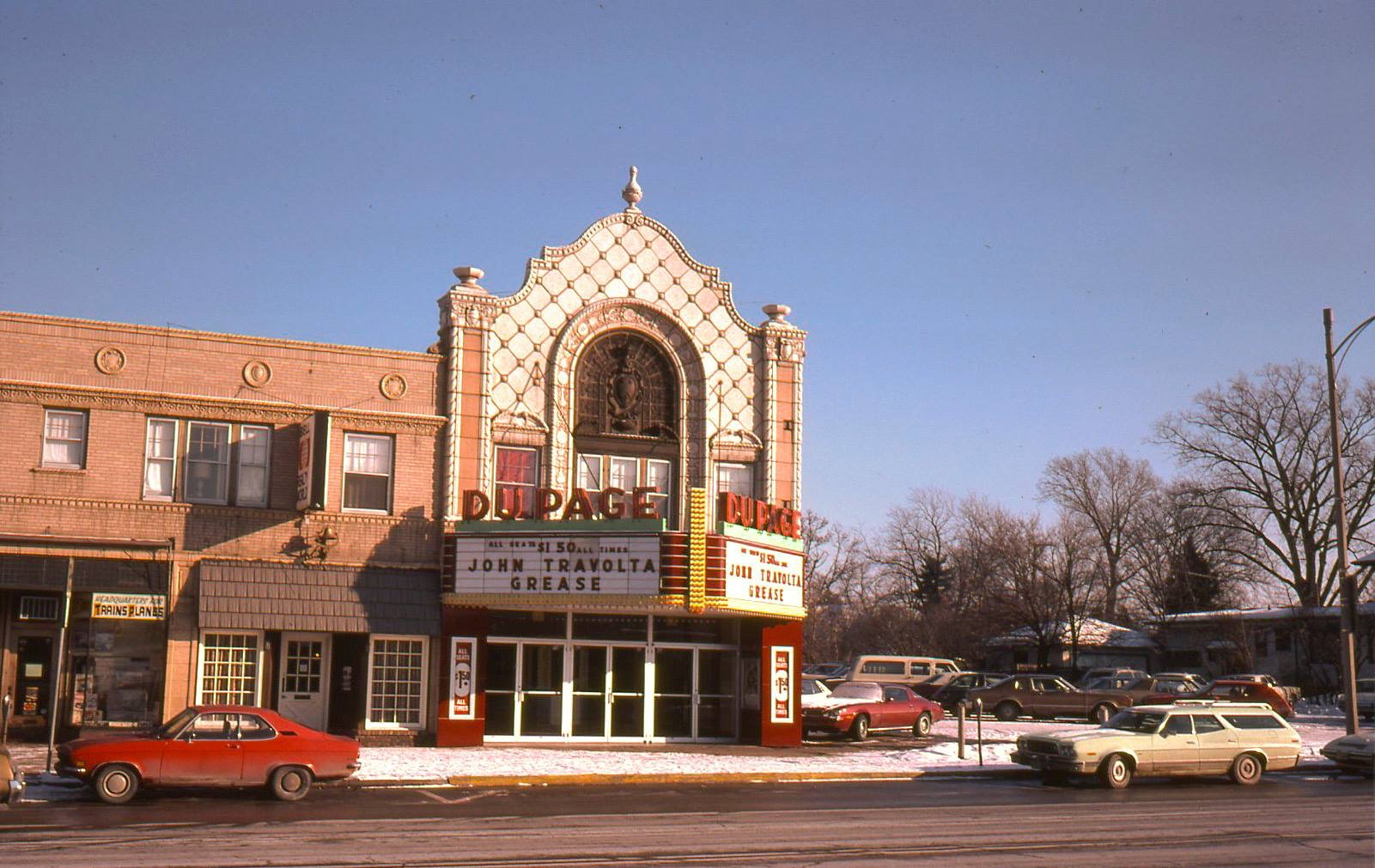
- The DuPage Theatre and Shoppes in the late 1970’s

- Location within Illinois Location within the United States
- Location: 101-109 S. Main St. Lombard, DuPage County, Illinois, U.S.
- Coordinates: 41°53′9″N 88°1′4″W
- Built: 1928
- Architect: R. G. Wolff
- Demolished: 2007
- NRHP reference No.: 87002047

Significant dates
- Added to NRHP: November 20, 1987
- Removed from NRHP: January 2, 2020

The DuPage Theatre and DuPage Shoppes, nicknamed "The Duper", was an historic movie theater in Lombard, Illinois.

== History ==
The 800-capacity theater was designed by R. G. Wolff, who formerly worked for Rapp and Rapp. Wolff was a consultant for the Chicago Theatre and was responsible for the design of several others (including the Patio Theater on the northwest side of Chicago). The theater was named after the county to bring out-of-town customers to the shows. Built in 1927, The DuPage was a Spanish patio-style theater (similar to the Uptown Theatre) that also incorporated commercial and residential aspects in its buildings. The theater was originally a single screen, but it has been divided into two screens that showed $1 movies in its later years. As a small town, the six shops incorporated into the theater comprised a large portion of the village's commerce at the time. The shops and theater also benefited from their proximity to the Chicago and North Western Railway.

The DuPage Theatre and DuPage Shoppes were added to the National Register of Historic Places in 1987. In 1990, Paul Anderson and Fatal Beauty Studios (a local recording studio) attempted to open the theatre as a concert hall, but the Village Board rejected the proposal. In the interim, the theatre lay vacant until 2000, when Big Idea Productions, Inc., a producer of children's videos, purchased the property. The company planned to renovate the theater and use the other space for its corporate headquarters. After determining that the site would need to be more significant for their plans, they pulled out and returned the theater to village ownership. Lombard appointed several committees to oversee the feasibility of rehabilitating the theater. Their efforts were ultimately unsuccessful, and in May 2007, the DuPage Theatre and DuPage Shoppes were demolished. They were removed from the National Register in 2020. The land where the building stood remained vacant until 2021, when ground was broken for new luxury apartments.
