= Democratic Unionist Party (disambiguation) =

The Democratic Unionist Party is a Northern Irish political party.

Democratic Unionist Party may also refer to:

- Arabic Democratic Unionist Party, a Syrian political party
- Democratic Unionist Party (Sudan), a Sudanese political party
- Socialist Democratic Unionist Party, a Mauritanian political party

== See also ==
- Democratic Union Party (disambiguation)
