= French World Scrabble Championships =

International competition

The French World Scrabble Championships (French: Championnats du monde de Scrabble francophone) is an annual Scrabble tournament that takes place in a different French-speaking country every year. Created in 1972 by Hippolyte Wouters, it was the first of the three World Scrabble Championships to be created, with the English version being created in 1991 and the Spanish version being created in 1997.

Unlike the English and Spanish versions, the French World Championships are made up of various tournaments, somewhat like the World Series of Poker. The "Main Event" is the Elite tournament which has existed since 1972, and was first won by the tournament's creator Hippolyte Wouters.

== List of tournaments ==
=== World Championships ===
- Elite: Each national federation has a specified number of places in the Elite division in different age categories: Up to 16, 16–18, 18–25, 25–62, 62–72 and 72+. Each of these age categories has its own World Champion, but the individual World Champion is the player that wins the tournament. The tournament is a duplicate tournament where players do not play matches, but play every move with the same letters and board configuration as every other player and try to get the maximum score by playing the highest scoring move every time. Players play 7 games of 2 minutes per move.
- Paires: Duplicate Scrabble in pairs, with two players discussing and submitting their solution together. 4 games are played with two minutes per move, followed by 2 games with just one minute per move. Players can form mixed pair, i.e. not both from the same country.
- Blitz: A normal duplicate tournament but with 4 games with just one minute per move for all four games.
- Classique (match play): Players play 17 games, two players to a board with the final standings being judged by games won and total points scored minus the total number of points scored by the player's opponents. The top two players in the standings play a best-of-three final to determine the World Champion. The tournament is very popular with Arab players as Duplicate Scrabble is less popular in the Arab World than it is in Europe.

=== Other tournaments ===
Some other tournaments are organised during the week which do not crown a World Champion but do have a winner:

- Open classique: a matchplay Scrabble tournament open to players who have not already qualified for the Elite world championship. The winner qualifies for the Elite.
- Open duplicate: an open duplicate tournament which anyone can compete in. Players who are qualified for the Elite are barred from competing in the Open under the rules of the International Federation.
- Défi mondial: A duplicate game reserved for qualified players. The game is a normal duplicate game, apart from any player who misses the highest scoring solution is eliminated. This process continues until there is only one player remaining. To make things harder, the game starts at 80 seconds per move and goes down to 60 then 40 seconds per move.
- Défi des jeunes: the same as the Défi mondial but for players aged under 18. Another notable difference is that each player can miss the highest scoring move once before being eliminated.

== History of the Championships ==
The French World Scrabble Championships started off as a small tournament in Cannes with just 7 players, and at the time, was not considered to be a World Championship. The tournament moved each year and more and more players which led to other tournaments being created at the same venue. The Elite tournament was at first dominated by Belgian players, with 5 of the first 7 championships being won by Belgian players. After three French winners in 1979, 1980 and 1981 the tournament was taken over by Michel Duguet of France who won the tournament 5 times in 7 years, while finishing second twice in that period. Duguet also set various championship records by dropping just 12 points in 5 games, which is 99.71%. After winning the Elite World Championship for a 5th time he retired from Scrabble and took up contract bridge and became one of the best players in the world, competing in both the French national championships and the European team championships.

After Duguet's retirement the French domination of the championships continued, with in total 12 championships in a row being won by France. Indeed, France also took second place every year during that ran, apart from in 1990 when Christian Pierre of Belgium finished second. In 1991 it was Christian Pierre who won Belgium's first title since 1978 and continued to win the title a total of 5 times in 8 years, matching what Duguet did in the 1980s. In 2002 and 2003 Jean Pierre Hellebaut became the first Swiss winner of the tournament. In fact he was born in Belgium and had previously finished second in the Belgian national championship in 1991 but after moving to Switzerland, won the World Championship 2 years in a row, a feat only accomplished before that by Duguet and Pierre. Antonin Michel has since dominated the Elite World Championships, having won the tournament twice in 2005 and 2007 and having finished second in 2001 and 2006.

The pairs event has been mainly dominated by France; Michel Duguet holds the record with five titles while Antonin Michel and Franck Maniquant (also of France) are just behind with 4 titles. Two African players have won the title - Ndongo Samba Sylla and Mactar Sylla of Senegal - these two are in fact brothers.

The blitz is a relatively recent event, added in 2001 and 5 of the 8 championships have been won by Antonin Michel. The four other winners and Florian Lévy and Franck Maniquant of France, and Ndongo Samba Sylla and Mactar Sylla of Senegal.

The match play tournament known as le Championnat du monde de Scrabble classique was brought in during 2006 and has been systematically dominated by African players, showing that the traditional form of Scrabble is more popular in Africa than the duplicate one. In 2008 in Dakar, 7 of the top 10 players were African, the three exceptions being Pascal Astresses, Antonin Michel and Hervé Bohbot all from France. More recently, the 2015 event saw Africans claim six of the top 10 places, and in 2016 the top three players and seven of the top 10 were Africans.

== List of winners of the Elite (duplicate individual) tournament ==
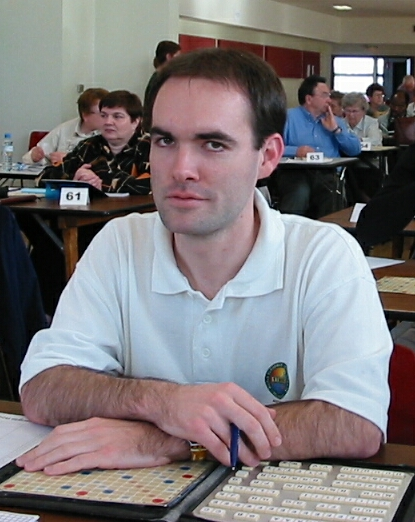
Antonin Michel, winner of the Elite tournament in 2005, 2007, 2010 and 2013.

Year	Host city	Winner	Nationality	Runner-up	Nationality
1972	(France) Cannes	Hippolyte Wouters	Belgium	Sarah Wolfowicz	Belgium
1973	(Belgium) Liège	Agnès Lempereur	Belgium	Dominique Darmstaedter	Belgium
1974	Monaco	Marc Selis	Belgium	Dominique Darmstaedter	Belgium
1975	(Spain) Estepona	Michel Charlemagne	France	Marc Selis	Belgium
1976	(Tunisia) Djerba	Marc Selis	Belgium	Michel Charlemagne	France
1977	(France) Aix-les-Bains	Jean-Marc Bellot	France	Michel Pialat	France
1978	(Belgium) Brussels	Yvon Duval	Belgium	Claude Del	France
1979	(France) Vichy	Benjamin Hannuna	France	Vincent Labbé	France
1980	(Belgium) Liège	Vincent Labbé	France	Robert Laïk	France
1981	(Switzerland) Montreux	Jacques-Henri Muracciole	France	Marc Esquerré	France
1982	(Tunisia) Hammamet	Michel Duguet	France	Benjamin Hannuna	France
1983	(France) Grenoble	Michel Duguet	France	Frank Pluven	France
1984	(Canada) Montreal	Benjamin Hannuna	France	Michel Duguet	France
1985	(Belgium) Brussels	Michel Duguet	France	Claude Del	France
1986	(Switzerland) Lausanne	Philippe Bellosta	France	Michel Duguet	France
1987	(France) Metz	Michel Duguet	France	Philippe Lorenzo	France
1988	(Canada) Quebec	Michel Duguet	France	Jean-Louis Pallavicini	France
1989	(Belgium) Namur	Paul Levart	France	Marc Treiber	France
1990	(Senegal) Dakar	Marc Treiber	France	Christian Pierre	Belgium
1991	(Switzerland) Fleurier	Christian Pierre	Belgium	Paul Levart	France
1992	(Canada) Hull	Christian Pierre	Belgium	Emmanuel Rivalan	France
1993	(France) Saint-Malo	Emmanuel Rivalan	France	Franck Maniquant	France
1994	(Belgium) Libramont	Christian Pierre	Belgium	Eddy Clauwaert	Belgium
1995	(Switzerland) Ovronnaz	Jean-François Lachaud	France	Franck Maniquant	France
1996	(France) Aix-les-Bains	Christian Pierre	Belgium	Nicolas Grellet	France
1997	(Canada) Saint-Hyacinthe	Aurélien Kermarrec	France	Emmanuel Rivalan	France
1998	(Belgium) Brussels	Christian Pierre	Belgium	Franck Maniquant	France
1999	(Switzerland) Bulle	Emmanuel Rivalan	France	Jean-François Lachaud	France
2000	(France) Paris	Florian Lévy	France	Gérard Boccon	France
2001	(France) La Rochelle	Franck Maniquant	France	Antonin Michel and Emmanuel Rivalan	France
2002	(Canada) Montreal	Jean Pierre Hellebaut	Switzerland	Thierry Chincholle	France
2003	(Belgium) Liège	Jean Pierre Hellebaut	Switzerland	Christian Pierre	Belgium
2004	(Morocco) Marrakesh	Germain Boulianne	Canada	Franck Maniquant	France
2005	(Switzerland) Neuchâtel	Antonin Michel	France	Jean Pierre Hellebaut	Switzerland
2006	(France) Tours	Pascal Fritsch	France	Antonin Michel	France
2007	(Canada) Quebec City	Antonin Michel	France	Christian Pierre	Belgium
2008	(Senegal) Dakar	Éric Vennin	Belgium	Aurélien Delaruelle	France
2009	(Belgium) Mons	Hugo Delafontaine	Switzerland	Christian Pierre	Belgium
2010	(France) Montpellier	Antonin Michel	France	Didier Roques	France
2011	(Switzerland) Montreux	Francis Desjardins	Canada	Antonin Michel	France
2012	(France) Montauban	David Bovet	Switzerland	Étienne Budry	France
2013	(Canada) Rimouski	Antonin Michel	France	David Bovet	Switzerland
2014	(France) Aix-les-Bains	Hugo Delafontaine	Switzerland	Francis Desjardins	Canada
2015	(Belgium) Louvain-la-Neuve	David Bovet	Switzerland	Nigel Richards	New Zealand
2016	(Morocco) Agadir	Hugo Delafontaine	Switzerland	Arnaud Mulonda	Democratic Republic of the Congo
2017	(Switzerland) Martigny	Nigel Richards	New Zealand	Thierry Chincholle	France
2018	(Canada) Mont-Tremblant	Nigel Richards	New Zealand	Arnaud Mulonda	Democratic Republic of the Congo
2019	(France) La Rochelle	Nigel Richards	New Zealand	N'Dongo Samba Sylla	Senegal

== List of winners of the Classique (matchplay) tournament ==
Year	Host city	Winner	Nationality	Runner-up	Nationality
2006	(France) Tours	Parfait Mouanda	Republic of the Congo	Henry-Marcel Engonge	Democratic Republic of the Congo
2007	(Canada) Quebec	Amar Diokh	Senegal	Edouard Lebeau	France
2008	(Senegal) Dakar	Élisée Poka	Ivory Coast	Pascal Astresses	France
2009	(Belgium) Mons	Benjamin Valour	France	Pierre-Olivier Georget	France
2010	(France) Montpellier	Christian Coustillas	France	Gille Sauze	France
2011	(Switzerland) Montreux	Jean-François Ramel	France	Julien Affaton	Benin
2012	(France) Montauban	Pierre-Olivier Georget	France	Julien Affaton	Benin
2013	(Canada) Rimouski	Christian Coustillas	France	Julien Affaton	Benin
2014	(France) Aix-les-Bains	Julien Affaton	Benin	Schélick Ilagou Rekawe	Gabon
2015	(Belgium) Louvain-la-Neuve	Nigel Richards	New Zealand	Schélick Ilagou Rekawe	Gabon
2016	(Morocco) Agadir	Abib Alabi	Ivory Coast	Gildas Ingrid Madela	Gabon
2017	(Switzerland) Martigny	Benjamin Valour	France	Belphégore Mpaga Réténo	Gabon
2018	(Canada) Mont-Tremblant	Nigel Richards	New Zealand	Gueu Mathieu Zingbe	Ivory Coast
2019	(France) La Rochelle	Francis Desjardins	Canada	Élisée Poka	Ivory Coast
