= Democratic Union Party =

The Democratic Union Party may refer to:

- Democratic Union Party (Bukovina), Romanian political party
- Democratic Union Party (Cuba), Cuban political party
- Democratic Union Party (Egypt), Egyptian political party
- Democratic Union Party (Greece), Greek political party
- Democratic Union Party (Peru), Peruvian political party
- Democratic Union Party (Syria), Syrian Kurdish political party
- Democratic Union (Russia), Russian political party

== See also ==
- Democratic Unionist Party (disambiguation)
