= Reproduction auto part =

Independently manufactured part to meet OEM specifications by a third party manufacturer

A reproduction part, or repro, is a part that has been independently manufactured to meet original equipment manufacturer's (OEM) specifications by a third party manufacturer. This is usually done to meet demand for spare parts no longer produced by the manufacturer. While some reproductions may be indistinguishable from the originals, most are close replicas.

== Advantages and disadvantages ==
- The first, obvious advantage is having the item available again, which aides in the restoration of a vehicle to the correct, factory specifications. It also cancels the need to find a good used part otherwise not available new, or the sourcing out of NOS parts (New Old Stock) which can be a difficult, time consuming task and often an expensive one due to their rarity. Many auto manufacturers actually discard or even destroy new parts that have been stocked unused for long periods.
- A common disadvantage of the reproduction part is often the need for it to be produced in industrial quantities requiring mass production using costly tooling, thus prohibiting the reproduction of certain items which may prove uneconomical. As time passes, many vehicles become scarce and large quantity productions are not possible.
- Quality issues may arise when reproducing items. Some suppliers will inevitably reduce the quality of the part to allow for a lower retail price - Keeping in mind auto manufacturers normally produce their items in mass, it is often impossible for a supplier to repeat the process without lowering quantity or quality for obvious reasons.
- Price - Reproductions are sometimes considerably more expensive than the originals, for the reasons listed above.

== Production methods ==
- There are many methods for reproducing parts, depending on the part, its use and the materials it is made of. One possibility is contacting the OEM who originally made the part and might still have the necessary tooling. In such case, an original part is obtained without the need for a wide research or extensive reverse-engineering.
- Lamp lenses (like headlight lenses, taillight lenses and side marker lenses) can often be produced taking an original item as a master, making molds using liquid resins. There are several drawbacks to this method, mostly an inferior quality final result, and the difficulty to make lenses incorporating several colors.
- Other parts are made using CNC machining, plastic injection molding, metal stamping etc.
- An extremely accurate repro brings a vehicle close to its original, factory new condition. This is a very important factor in classic auto-shows and concours competitions.

=== Distinguishing repros ===
- A knowledgeable person with a discerning vision can usually distinguish an original part from a non-original part. Different production methods leave different marks on parts. Mold parting lines, machining marks, etc. Some makers go to great lengths and even reproduce the original markings and part numbers originally found on the item. A carefully executed part will be very difficult to distinguish from an original.
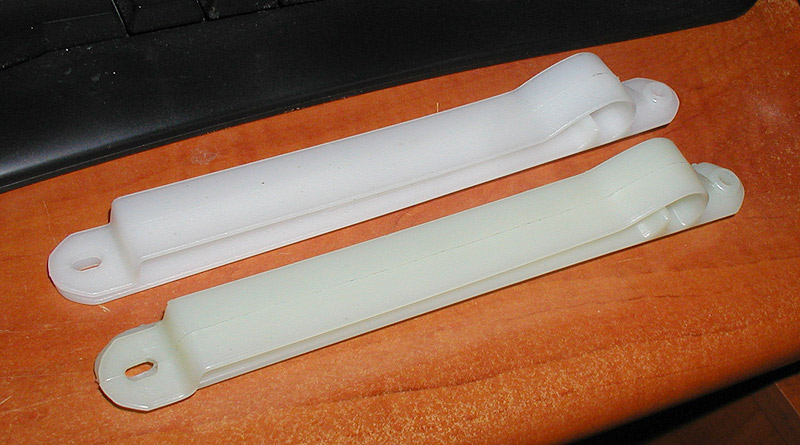
An Alfa Romeo Alfetta GTV hood prop rod guide - The part shown on top is a reproduction of the original below.

== Market overview ==
- The market of reproduced parts mostly depends, like many other things, on supply and demand. Vehicles that are still quite popular (for example a Ford Mustang or a VW Beetle) have a vast array of parts readily available. Some of them are OEM re-productions and some are newly made, mass produced items. Owners of a rare marque or model will find it more difficult sourcing out new parts. In many cases, vintage or pre-war vehicles have their parts remade as one-offs by professionals. There are some very large retailers of reproduction parts, especially in the U.S.
- Nowadays, the market for repros is a steadily growing field which helps owners and collectors of vintage or rare cars maintain their vehicles in original condition.

== See also ==
- DMSMS
