= Redundancy =

Redundancy or redundant may refer to:

== Language ==
- Redundancy (linguistics), information that is expressed more than once

== Engineering and computer science ==
- Data redundancy, database systems which have a field that is repeated in two or more tables
- Logic redundancy, a digital gate network containing circuitry that does not affect the static logic function
- Redundancy (engineering), the duplication of critical components or functions of a system with the intention of increasing reliability
- Redundancy (information theory), the number of bits used to transmit a message minus the number of bits of actual information in the message
- Redundancy in total quality management, quality which exceeds the required quality level, creating unnecessarily high costs
- The same task executed by several different methods in a user interface

== Biology ==
- Codon redundancy, the redundancy of the genetic code exhibited as the multiplicity of three-codon combinations
- Cytokine redundancy, a term in immunology referring to the phenomenon in which, and the ability of, multiple cytokines to exert similar actions
- Gene redundancy, the existence of several genes in the genome of an organism that perform the same role to some extent

== As a proper name ==
- "Redundant" (song), 1997 song by American rock band Green Day
- Redundant (play), 2001 drama by Leo Butler

== Other uses ==
- Redundant church, no longer used for worship
- Redundancy in United Kingdom law, dismissal for economic reasons

== See also ==
- Voluntary redundancy, termination of employment by agreement between employee and employer
