= Copy and paste (disambiguation) =

Copy and paste is a method for digital transfer of text or other data in computing

Copy and paste may also refer to:

- "Copy, Paste", a song by American rapper Diggy Simmons
- Copy & Paste (album), a repackaged version of Hurricane Venus by South Korean artist BoA
- Copy/Paste (album), 2024 album by Garbage

== See also ==
- Copypasta
- Cut and paste (disambiguation)
