= Redundant (song) =

1998 single by Green Day

Single by Green Day

from the album Nimrod
- Released: April 15, 1998
- Genre: Pop-punk; alternative rock
- Length: 3:17
- Label: Reprise
- Composer: Green Day
- Lyricist: Billie Joe Armstrong
- Producers: Rob Cavallo; Green Day

Green Day singles chronology
"Good Riddance (Time of Your Life)" (1997)	"Redundant" (1998)	"Nice Guys Finish Last" (1999)

Music video
- "Redundant" on YouTube

"Redundant" is a song by American rock band Green Day. It was released as the third single from their fifth album, Nimrod (1997), in April 1998 and serves as the album's fourth track. Although the song failed to match the chart positions of its predecessors, it did reach number two in Australia when it was reissued as a double A-side with "Good Riddance (Time of Your Life)", becoming the band's highest-charting solo single there.

== Music video ==
The music video for "Redundant", directed by Mark Kohr, is an homage to Zbigniew Rybczyński's short film Tango. It features the three band members performing the song in the middle of a home. The camera angle remains static for the duration of the video.

In the background, several people repeat various mundane tasks for the duration of the video:

- A newspaper is thrown from offscreen.
- A woman stretches her arms and yawns, and then collects the paper and leaves.
- Someone takes a painting off of a wall and replaces it with a new one; then someone else comes in and replaces that painting with the one that has just been replaced.
- An old lady walks in and tries to find her way out.
- A young girl walks from the left side of the screen, places a box on the coffee table next to the couch, and then climbs out of a window.
- A man in a green suit jacket walks around, picks up the box from the coffee table and leaves.
- A man in a cowboy hat comes in through a door and walks around.
- A woman in a bright red dress (Dita Von Teese) removes her dress and then walks away in her bra and shorts.
- A balding man comes in, puts on a pair of trousers, then leaves.
- An obese man walks in from behind, bringing a plant and putting it on a table by the wall.
- A woman with a large pot picks up the plant and walks around.
- A couple walks towards a couch and begins making out, then leave while they continue kissing.
- A man is vacuuming.
- A young boy wearing red boxer shorts and long black socks comes in through a window, looks around, and leaves.

The activity peaks near the middle of the video and declines near the end. Tré and Mike leave, but Billie Joe removes his guitar, hands it offscreen, and picks up the newspaper before walking away. The woman comes out to get the paper and screams upon finding it gone.

== Track listings ==
UK CD1
No.	Title	Length
1.	"Redundant" (Richard Dodd Medium Wide mix)	3:16
2.	"The Grouch" (live)	2:23
3.	"Paper Lanterns" (live)	4:54

UK CD2
No.	Title	Length
1.	"Redundant" (Richard Dodd Medium Wide mix)	3:16
2.	"Reject All American" (live)	2:09
3.	"She" (live)	2:28

UK single 7-inch

Side A
No.	Title	Length
1.	"Redundant" (Richard Dodd Medium Wide mix)	3:16

Side B
No.	Title	Length
2.	"The Grouch" (live)	3:23

Australian CD single
No.	Title	Length
1.	"Redundant" (Richard Dodd Medium Wide Mix)
2.	"The Grouch" (live)
3.	"Paper Lanterns" (live)
4.	"Reject All American" (live)
5.	"She"

Australian CD single with "Good Riddance"
No.	Title	Length
1.	"Redundant" (LP version)
2.	"Good Riddance (Time of Your Life)" (LP version)

The live tracks were recorded live at the Electric Factory in Philadelphia, Pennsylvania. "The Grouch", "Paper Lanterns" and "She" were recorded during the show proper and were later released as part of the full show for Nimrod's 25th anniversary, while "Reject All American" was recorded during the soundcheck for the same show (which explains the absence of any crowd noise on that particular song).

== Charts ==
=== Weekly charts ===
Weekly chart performance for "Redundant"
Chart (1998)	Peak position
Australia (ARIA)	50
Australia (ARIA) with "Good Riddance (Time of Your Life)"	2
Canada Rock/Alternative (RPM)	20
Scottish Singles Sales (Official Charts)	23
UK Singles (Official Charts)	27
US Alternative Airplay (Billboard)	16

=== Year-end charts ===
Year-end chart performance for "Redundant"
Chart (1998)	Position
Australia (ARIA) with "Good Riddance (Time of Your Life)"	8
US Modern Rock Tracks (Billboard)	74

== Certifications ==
Certifications and sales for "Redundant"
Region	Certification	Certified units/sales
Australia (ARIA)	2× Platinum	140,000^{^}
^{^} Shipments figures based on certification alone.

== Release history ==
Release dates and formats for "Redundant"
Region	Date	Format(s)	Label(s)	Ref.
United States	March 31, 1998	Modern rock radio	Reprise	
Japan	April 15, 1998	CD	Reprise	
United Kingdom	April 27, 1998	7-inch vinyl; CD	Reprise	
