= Good Riddance (Time of Your Life) =

1997 single by Green Day

Single by Green Day

from the album Nimrod
- B-side: "Desensitized"; "Rotting"
- Released: December 2, 1997
- Studio: Conway (Hollywood, California)
- Genre: Alternative rock; folk; folk punk; acoustic rock
- Length: 2:34 (album version); 2:28 (music video)
- Label: Reprise
- Composer: Green Day
- Lyricist: Billie Joe Armstrong
- Producers: Rob Cavallo; Green Day

Green Day singles chronology
"Hitchin'a Ride" (1997)	"Good Riddance (Time of Your Life)" (1997)	"Redundant" (1998)

Music video
- "Good Riddance (Time Of Your Life)" on YouTube

"Good Riddance (Time of Your Life)" (or "Time of Your Life (Good Riddance)") is a song by American rock band Green Day, released in December 1997 as the second single from their fifth studio album, Nimrod (1997). It is one of the band's most popular songs and has also become a staple of their concerts, usually played as the final song.

"Good Riddance (Time of Your Life)" became a chart hit, peaking at number 11 on the US Billboard Hot 100 Airplay chart and reaching the top 20 in Australia, Canada, Iceland, and the United Kingdom. As of November 2022, the song had sold over five million copies and is certified quintuple platinum in the United States, sextuple platinum in Canada, triple platinum in both New Zealand and the United Kingdom, and double platinum in Australia, making it the band's most commercially successful single.

== Background ==
Lead singer Billie Joe Armstrong wrote "Good Riddance (Time of Your Life)" in 1993 about his girlfriend named Amanda who moved to Ecuador, with him naming the song "Good Riddance" to show his anger towards her. He did not show the song to his bandmates until the Dookie recording sessions later the same year. During the sessions, however, the song was determined to be too different from the rest of the songs on Dookie, and producer Rob Cavallo was unsure of how to structure the recording.

An early version of the song (in a different key, with a faster tempo and sparer arrangement) simply titled "Good Riddance" appeared as a B-side to the European single for "Brain Stew/Jaded".

When the time came to record Nimrod, Armstrong decided to record the song again, and Cavallo suggested they add strings to the track. He sent the band to play foosball in another room while he recorded the strings, which took "like fifteen, twenty minutes, maybe a half an hour at the most". Cavallo reflected on his decision to add the strings: "I knew we had done the right thing. It was a hit the second I heard it."

== Composition ==
In comparison to previous Green Day material, "Good Riddance (Time of Your Life)" features more mellow, contemplative lyrics with acoustic music. Band member Mike Dirnt said that the release of this song was probably the "most punk" thing they could have done.

The song has been labelled alternative rock, folk, folk punk, and acoustic rock. It is written in the key of G major with a tempo of 86 beats per minute. Armstrong's vocals span from the note of E4 to E5.

== Album version ==
The album version of the song begins with Armstrong messing up the opening chords twice, muttering "fuck" under his breath before starting over and getting it right, thus starting the song. The mistakes were deliberately kept to add a lighthearted introduction to a song with emotionally deep lyrics. Radio versions and the music video omitted Armstrong's second attempt with the expletive.

== Music video ==
The music video was directed by Mark Kohr in Los Angeles in November 1997, and is based on a concept by Armstrong. The video features Armstrong singing and playing an acoustic guitar in an apartment (filmed in the Ambassador Hotel in Los Angeles), intercut with "pull-in" shots of various people involved in mundane activities. All of the subjects are shown seemingly staring into space absent-mindedly. Dirnt and Tré Cool make cameo appearances in the video as a person pumping gas (Dirnt), and an injured bike rider being attended by paramedics (Tré). When the video came out, the name of the song was inverted, hence the video's title is "Time of Your Life (Good Riddance)". This title was also used on the single cover. The music video focuses on one particular person at both the beginning and the ending of the song.

In 1998, Green Day won their first MTV Video Music Award for Best Alternative Video for "Good Riddance (Time of Your Life)" and they were also nominated for Viewer's Choice.

The video can be found on their music video compilation DVD, International Supervideos!

== Legacy ==
To the band's surprise, the song became a hit at prom dances. Because of the song's lyrics, which many graduating seniors interpret as nostalgic and reflective of their time in high school, it has become a staple song at proms. Armstrong remarked that, in retrospect, the lyrics make sense when viewed that way. "The people that you grew up and braved the trials of high school with will always hold a special place. Through all the BS of high school, you hope that your friends had the time of their life, and that's what the song is talking about".

The song is featured in the season nine episode of Seinfeld, titled "The Clip Show". The song plays in the closing minutes of the episode, which feature a series of bloopers, behind-the-scenes production, and a montage. It is the second-to-last episode of Seinfeld before the show's series finale in 1998. The song was also featured in the ending credits of Deadpool & Wolverine, playing with a montage of scenes and behind-the-scenes footage of several film adaptations, most noticeably from the X-Men film series.

On May 28, 2015, Rolling Stone named "Good Riddance (Time of Your Life)" as one of the 20 Best Graduation Songs of the Past 20 Years (1995–2015).

On August 14, 2024, All Elite Wrestling used the song in a video package on Dynamite, looking back on Bryan Danielson's 24+ years of wrestling (excluding WWE) ahead of his Title vs. Career match with Swerve Strickland at All In: Wembley II.

== Track listings ==
European CD
No.	Title	Length
1.	"Good Riddance (Time of Your Life)" (clean album remix)	2:28
2.	"Desensitized" (non-LP track)	2:47
3.	"Rotting" (non-LP track)	2:50
Total length:		8:05

Japanese/Australian CD
No.	Title	Length
1.	"Good Riddance (Time of Your Life)"	2:28
2.	"Rotting (non-LP track)"	2:50
3.	"Suffocate (non-LP track)"	2:57
4.	"You Lied (non-LP track)"	2:25
Total length:		10:40

Australian CD
No.	Title	Length
1.	"Redundant"	3:18
2.	"Good Riddance (Time of Your Life)" (album version)	2:34
3.	"Redundant" (video)	3:20
4.	"Good Riddance (Time of Your Life)" (video)	2:29
Total length:		11:41

== Personnel ==
=== Credits ===
- Billie Joe Armstrong – acoustic guitar, vocals
- David Campbell – string arrangement
- Conan McCallum – first violin

=== Additional credits ===
- Billie Joe Armstrong – lyrics
- Green Day – music
- Rob Cavallo and Green Day – production

== Charts ==
=== Weekly charts ===
1997–1998 weekly chart performance for "Good Riddance (Time of Your Life)"
Chart (1997–1998)	Peak position
Australia (ARIA)	44
Australia (ARIA) with "Redundant"	2
Canada Top Singles (RPM)	5
Canada Adult Contemporary (RPM)	24
Canada Rock/Alternative (RPM)	7
Europe (Eurochart Hot 100)	35
Iceland (Íslenski Listinn Topp 40)	5
Ireland (IRMA)	30
New Zealand (Recorded Music NZ)	40
Scottish Singles Sales (Official Charts)	9
Spain Airplay (Music & Media)	7
UK Singles (Official Charts)	11
UK Network Singles (ChartTrack)	7
US Radio Songs (Billboard)	11
US Adult Alternative Airplay (Billboard)	4
US Adult Pop Airplay (Billboard)	11
US Alternative Airplay (Billboard)	2
US Mainstream Rock Airplay (Billboard)	7
US Pop Airplay (Billboard)	13

2015 weekly chart performance for "Good Riddance (Time of Your Life)"
Chart (2015)	Peak position
US Digital Song Sales (Billboard)	50
US Rock Digital Songs (Billboard)	30

2021 weekly chart performance for "Good Riddance (Time of Your Life)"
Chart (2021)	Peak position
Canada Digital Song Sales (Billboard)	26

=== Year-end charts ===
Year-end chart performance for "Good Riddance (Time of Your Life)"
Chart (1998)	Position
Australia (ARIA) with "Redundant"	8
Canada Top Singles (RPM)	51
Iceland (Íslenski Listinn Topp 40)	39
US Hot 100 Airplay (Billboard)	19
US Adult Top 40 (Billboard)	9
US Mainstream Rock Tracks (Billboard)	30
US Mainstream Top 40 (Billboard)	40
US Modern Rock Tracks (Billboard)	5
US Triple-A (Billboard)	33

=== Decade-end charts ===
Decade-end chart performance for "Good Riddance (Time of Your Life)"
Chart (2010–2019)	Position
US Top Airplay Audience (Nielsen Music)	6
US Top Airplay Spins (Nielsen Music)	4

== Certifications ==
Certifications and sales for "Good Riddance (Time of Your Life)"
Region	Certification	Certified units/sales
Australia (ARIA)	2× Platinum	140,000^{^}
Canada (Music Canada)	6× Platinum	480,000^{‡}
Denmark (IFPI Danmark)	Gold	45,000^{‡}
Italy (FIMI)	Platinum	100,000^{‡}
New Zealand (RMNZ)	4× Platinum	120,000^{‡}
Spain (Promusicae)	Gold	30,000^{‡}
United Kingdom (BPI)	3× Platinum	1,800,000^{‡}
United States (RIAA)	5× Platinum	5,000,000^{‡}
^{^} Shipments figures based on certification alone.^{‡} Sales+streaming figures based on certification alone.

== Release history ==
Release dates and formats for "Good Riddance (Time of Your Life)"
Region	Date	Format(s)	Label(s)	Ref.
United States	December 2, 1997	Contemporary hit radio	Reprise	
Japan	December 15, 1997	CD	Reprise	
United Kingdom	January 19, 1998	CD; cassette	Reprise	
