= She (Green Day song) =

Promotional single by Green Day

from the album Dookie
- Released: May 5, 1995
- Recorded: 1993
- Genre: Punk rock; pop-punk
- Length: 2:14
- Label: Reprise; WEA International
- Composers: Billie Joe Armstrong; Mike Dirnt; Tré Cool
- Lyricist: Billie Joe Armstrong
- Producers: Rob Cavallo; Green Day

Green Day singles chronology
"When I Come Around" (1995)	"She" (1995)	"J.A.R." (1995)

Audio
- "She" on YouTube

"She" is a song by the American rock band Green Day. It is the eighth track on their third album, Dookie, and was released as Green Day's first promotional single in their discography. The song was written by frontman Billie Joe Armstrong about a former girlfriend who showed him a feminist poem with an identical title. In return, Armstrong wrote the lyrics of "She" and showed them to her. She later dumped him and moved to Ecuador, prompting Armstrong to put "She" on the album. The same ex-girlfriend is the topic of the songs "Sassafras Roots" and "Chump". It is one of the few Green Day singles that did not have a music video.

== Reception ==
The song has been frequently listed as one of Green Day's best songs. Kerrang! listed it as their second best song, while Rolling Stone listed it as their seventh. PopMatters listed "She" as the eighth best Green Day song, citing "'She' is sensitive without being soft; in between Armstrong's empathetic declarations of 'Scream at me / Until my ears bleed / I'm taking heed / Just for you', the band is hammering away at its instruments with amped-up intensity."

== Covers ==
In 2016, British-American band As It Is covered the song for the Green Day cover album American Superhits!.

In 2018, Californian punk-ska band Mad Caddies covered the song with a reggae beat for their cover album Punk Rocksteady.

== Credits and personnel ==
Credits are adapted from Apple Music.

Green Day

- Billie Joe Armstrong – lead vocals, lead guitar, composer
- Mike Dirnt – bass guitar, backing vocals, composer
- Tré Cool – drums, composer

Additional personnel

- Green Day – producer, mixing engineer
- Rob Cavallo - producer, mixing engineer
- Jerry Finn - mixing engineer
- Neill King - recording engineer
- Casey McCrankin - additional engineer

== Charts ==
=== Weekly charts ===
Chart (1995)	Peak position
US Radio Songs (Billboard)	41
US Alternative Airplay (Billboard)	5
US Mainstream Rock (Billboard)	18

=== Year-end charts ===
Chart (1995)	Position
US Modern Rock Tracks (Billboard)	35

== Certifications ==
Region	Certification	Certified units/sales
Canada (Music Canada)	Gold	40,000^{‡}
^{‡} Sales+streaming figures based on certification alone.
