= Duplicate Scrabble =

Scrabble variant

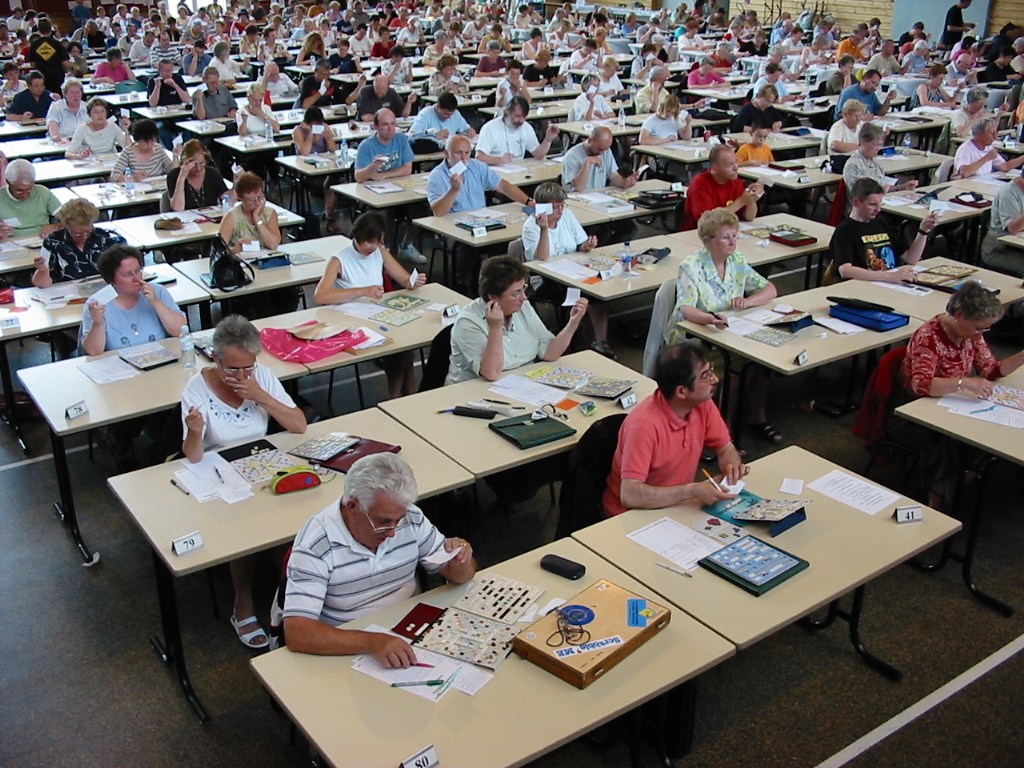
At the end of the allotted time, the players must hold up their slips to be collected by a runner.

Duplicate Scrabble is a variant of Scrabble where all the players are faced with the same board and letters at the same time and must play the highest-scoring word they can find. Although duplicate is rarely played at competition level in the United States, it is the most popular form of the game in Europe, most notably in France, Romania and the Netherlands, and is also played in Canada. The largest European Scrabble festivals can attract over 2000 people and some individual tournaments can count over 1000 participants per game. Although not popular for competitions in the US, the computer game Scrabble 2005 contains a duplicate version allowing up to 16 players to play on the same board at once. It was also used on the UK TV game show TV Scrabble as one of the rounds.

== History ==
Duplicate Scrabble was invented by Hippolyte Wouters circa 1970, a Belgian lawyer who spoke French as his first language. In 1972 he organised and participated the first French World Scrabble Championships in Cannes. Although only 8 players participated in this tournament, a World Championship has been organised every year since 1972 in a city in several countries.

Due to the nature of duplicate, there is almost no limit to the number of players who can participate in a single game, and at the biggest international festivals, some games are played by more than 1000 people simultaneously. In French, duplicate is practised in France, Belgium, Canada, Switzerland, Senegal, Benin, Tunisia, Lebanon and many other countries.

Duplicate Scrabble has been part of the Romanian national championship since 1981.

== Rules ==
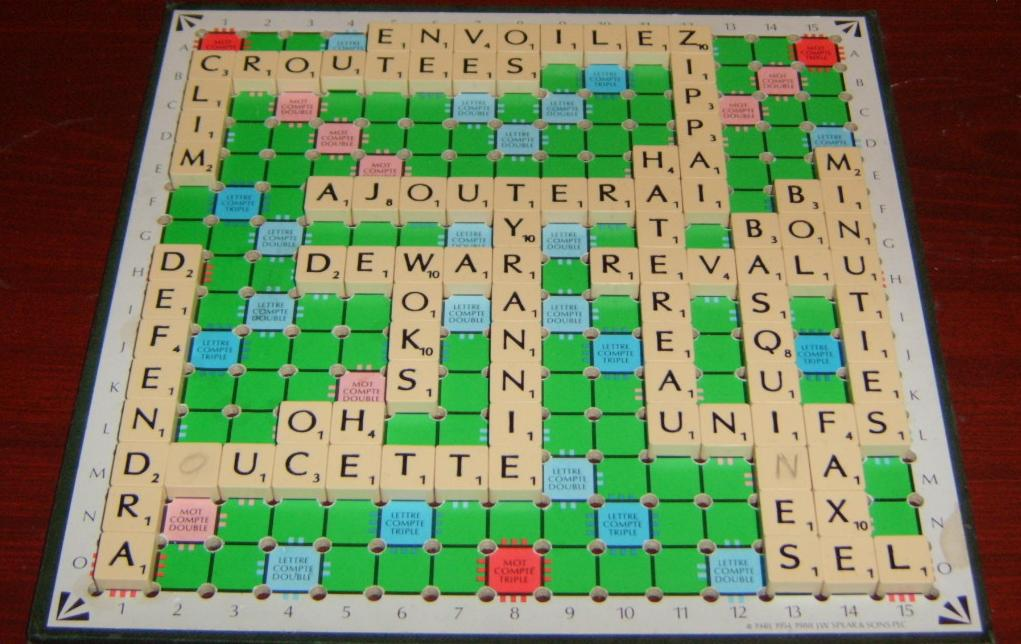
A completed duplicate game in French.

The rules of duplicate Scrabble can vary between languages and different associations. Some of the general principles of duplicate are

1. The arbiter draws seven random tiles at the start of the game. He announces them to the players who draw the same seven letters. The players are given an allotted time to write their chosen word on a slip of paper which will be collected by a runner and handed to an arbiter. The player is obligated to record the score and the position of his word, and the highest scoring word is placed on the board. Hence every player is faced with the same situation at the same time, and no player has any advantage because of the letters selected.
2. An invalid word scores zero points.
3. There must always be at least one vowel and one consonant. If the seven letters do not contain one vowel and one consonant, they are put back in the bag and seven new letters are chosen. If there are no more consonants or no more vowels in the bag, the game ends.
4. At the end of the game, the player who has scored the most points is declared the winner. This score can also be expressed as a percentage (by dividing by the total of all the best plays) or as a negative, for example 790 out of 800 would be -10 (or 98.75%).

== Variations ==
Thinking time
To make the game more difficult, the thinking time can be reduced. The standard thinking time in French is 3 minutes. Similar to chess, blitz games are played where the player only has 1 minute to make his moves. "Semi-rapid" games are also played with two minutes to make a move.
Number of players
Duplicate Scrabble can be played in pairs where the two players agree on which solution they will submit. The French World Scrabble Championship by pairs has been played every year since 1975. A duplicate pairs competition is also part of the Romanian national championship.

== See also ==
- Duplicate bridge
