= List of songs recorded by Green Day =

Songs recorded by Green Day

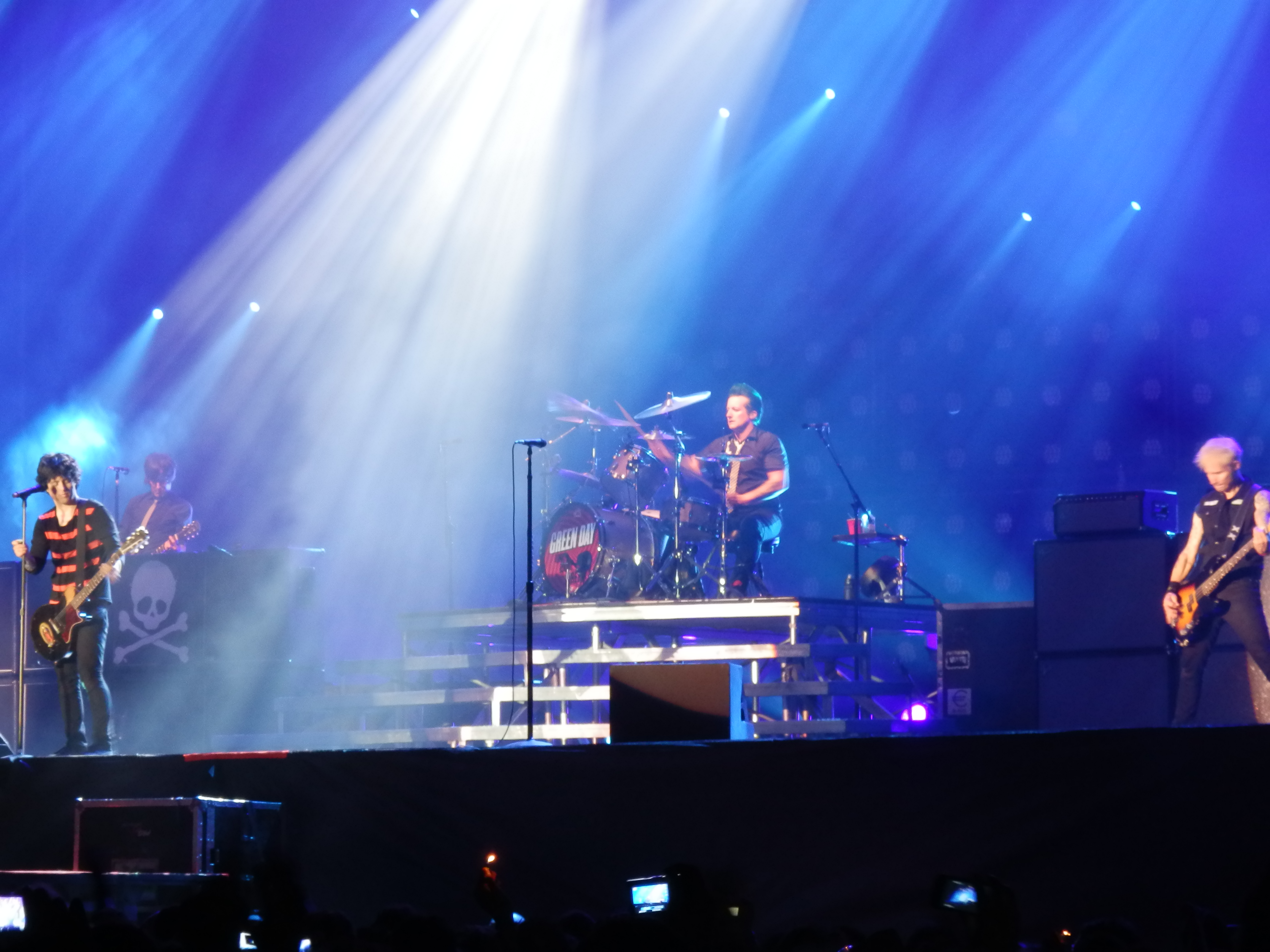
Green Day live in 2013

The following is a list of songs recorded by the American punk rock band Green Day. Since their first single in 1989, the band has gone on to release over 200 songs. This list includes songs from studio albums, compilation albums and singles, along with covers and known unreleased tracks. Songs recorded by any of the band's side projects are not included.

== List ==
Members of Green Day are Billie Joe Armstrong, Mike Dirnt, and Tré Cool, except where noted.

Key
†	Indicates cover version

Name of song, writers, release, year of release, and notes
Song	Writers		Release	Year	Notes	Ref.
Song	Lyrics	Music	Release	Year	Notes	Ref.
1,000 Hours (Note: Later appeared on 1,039/Smoothed Out Slappy Hours)	Billie Joe Armstrong	Green Day (Note: Billie Joe Armstrong, Mike Dirnt, and John Kiffmeyer)	1,000 Hours (EP)	1989		
16	Green Day		39/Smooth	1990		
1981	Billie Joe Armstrong	Green Day	Saviors	2024		
2000 Light Years Away	Billie Joe Armstrong	Green Day; Jesse Michaels; Pete Rypins; Dave E.C. Henwood	Kerplunk	1991		
21 Guns	Billie Joe Armstrong	Green Day	21st Century Breakdown	2009		
21st Century Breakdown	Billie Joe Armstrong	Green Day	21st Century Breakdown	2009		
409 in Your Coffeemaker	Billie Joe Armstrong	Green Day	Slappy (EP)	1990	Alternate version appears on "Basket Case" single	
80	Billie Joe Armstrong	Green Day	Kerplunk	1991		
86	Billie Joe Armstrong	Green Day	Insomniac	1995		
8th Avenue Serenade	Billie Joe Armstrong	Green Day	¡Tré!	2012		
99 Revolutions	Billie Joe Armstrong	Green Day	¡Tré!	2012		
All the Time	Billie Joe Armstrong	Green Day	Nimrod	1997		
Amanda	Billie Joe Armstrong	Green Day	¡Tré!	2012		
The American Dream Is Killing Me	Billie Joe Armstrong	Green Day	Saviors	2024		
American Eulogy (Note: Separated into subtitles:A. "Mass Hysteria" / B. "Modern World")	Billie Joe Armstrong	Green Day	21st Century Breakdown	2009		
American Idiot	Billie Joe Armstrong	Green Day	American Idiot	2004		
Amy	Billie Joe Armstrong	Green Day	¡Dos!	2012		
Android	Billie Joe Armstrong	Green Day	Kerplunk	1991		
Angel Blue	Billie Joe Armstrong	Green Day	¡Uno!	2012		
Another State of Mind † (Social Distortion cover)	Mike Ness		21st Century Breakdown	2009	Bonus track	
Are We the Waiting	Billie Joe Armstrong	Green Day	American Idiot	2004		
Armatage Shanks	Billie Joe Armstrong	Green Day	Insomniac	1995		
Ashley	Billie Joe Armstrong	Green Day	¡Dos!	2012		
At the Library	Green Day		39/Smooth	1990		
Bab's Uvula Who?	Billie Joe Armstrong	Green Day	Insomniac	1995	Originally titled All Wound Up	
"Baby Eyes"	Billie Joe Armstrong	Green Day	¡Dos!	2012		
"Back In the USA"			God's Favorite Band	2017		
"The Ballad of Wilhelm Fink"			Short Music for Short People	1999		
"Ballyhoo"	Billie Joe Armstrong	Green Day	Saviors (édition de luxe)	2025		
"Bang Bang"	Billie Joe Armstrong	Green Day	Revolution Radio	2016		
"Basket Case"	Billie Joe Armstrong	Green Day	Dookie	1994		
"Before the Lobotomy"	Billie Joe Armstrong	Green Day	21st Century Breakdown	2009		
"Best Thing in Town"	Billie Joe Armstrong; Mike Dirnt	Green Day	Sweet Children (EP)	1990	Appears on Kerplunk	
"Black Eyeliner"	Billie Joe Armstrong Mike Dirnt	Green Day	Nimrod	1997	Demo from the Nimrod sessions, released on Nimrod (25th Anniversary edition)	
"Blood, Sex and Booze"	Billie Joe Armstrong	Green Day	Warning	2000		
"Bobby Sox"	Billie Joe Armstrong	Green Day	Saviors	2024		
"Boulevard of Broken Dreams"	Billie Joe Armstrong	Green Day	American Idiot	2004		
"Bouncing Off the Wall"	Billie Joe Armstrong	Green Day	Revolution Radio	2016		
"Boys In the Bathroom Stall"	Tré Cool			2002	Posted on greenday.com as an audio message. A similar instrumental can be seen on "Heart Like a Handgrenade".	
"Brain Stew"	Billie Joe Armstrong	Green Day	Insomniac	1995	Originally titled "Insomniac"	
"Brat"	Billie Joe Armstrong	Green Day	Insomniac	1995		
"Brutal Love"	Billie Joe Armstrong	Green Day; Sam Cooke	¡Tré!	2012		
"Burnout"	Billie Joe Armstrong	Green Day	Dookie	1994		
"Carpe Diem"	Billie Joe Armstrong	Green Day; Jeff Shadbolt	¡Uno!	2012		
"Castaway"	Billie Joe Armstrong	Green Day	Warning	2000		
"Chain Saw" † (Ramones cover)	Joey Ramone		Nimrod	1997	Demo from the Nimrod sessions, released on Nimrod (25th Anniversary edition)	
"Chocolate Rain" † (Tay Zonday cover)	Tay Zonday			2007	Released on the YouTube channel "chocolatetcool"	
"Christian's Inferno"	Billie Joe Armstrong	Green Day	21st Century Breakdown	2009		
"Christie Road"	Billie Joe Armstrong	Green Day	Kerplunk	1991		
"Chump"	Billie Joe Armstrong	Green Day	Dookie	1994		
"Church on Sunday"	Billie Joe Armstrong	Green Day	Warning	2000		
"Cigarettes and Valentines"	Billie Joe Armstrong	Green Day	Awesome As Fuck	2011	Live recording	
"Coma City"	Billie Joe Armstrong	Green Day	Saviors	2024		
"Coming Clean"	Billie Joe Armstrong	Green Day	Dookie	1994		
"Corvette Summer"	Billie Joe Armstrong	Green Day	Saviors	2024		
"Deadbeat Holiday"	Billie Joe Armstrong	Green Day	Warning	2000		
"Desensitized"	Billie Joe Armstrong	Green Day	"Good Riddance (Time of Your Life)"	1997	Appears on Shenanigans	
"Dilemma"	Billie Joe Armstrong	Green Day	Saviors	2024		
"Dirty Rotten Bastards"	Billie Joe Armstrong	Green Day	¡Tré!	2012		
Disappearing Boy	Green Day		39/Smooth	1990		
"Do Da Da"	Billie Joe Armstrong	Green Day	"Brain Stew / Jaded"	1996	Appears on Shenanigans Originally titled "Stuck With Me"	
"Dominated Love Slave"	Tré Cool	Green Day	Kerplunk	1991		
Don't Leave Me	Green Day		39/Smooth	1990		
"Don't Wanna Fall in Love"	Billie Joe Armstrong	Green Day	Geek Stink Breath	1995	Appears on Shenanigans	
"Drama Queen"	Billie Joe Armstrong	Green Day	¡Tré!	2012	Originally recorded during 21st Century Breakdown	
"Dreaming" † (Blondie cover)	Chris Stein and Debbie Harry			2020		
Dry Ice	Billie Joe Armstrong	Green Day	1,000 Hours (EP)	1989		
"D.U.I"	Tré Cool		Nimrod outtake	1997	Released on advance review copies of Shenanigans, but pulled from the final track listing	
"East Jesus Nowhere"	Billie Joe Armstrong	Green Day	21st Century Breakdown	2009		
"Emenius Sleepus"	Mike Dirnt	Green Day	Dookie	1994		
"Espionage"	Instrumental	Green Day	"Hitchin' a Ride"	1997	Appears on Shenanigans	
"Extraordinary Girl"	Billie Joe Armstrong	Green Day	American Idiot	2004	Originally titled "Radio Baghdad"	
"F.O.D."	Billie Joe Armstrong	Green Day	Dookie	1994	Includes the hidden track "All By Myself"	
"Fancy Sauce"	Billie Joe Armstrong	Green Day	Saviors	2024		
"Fashion Victim"	Billie Joe Armstrong	Green Day	Warning	2000		
"Father of All..."	Green Day		Father of All Motherfuckers	2019		
"Father to a Son"	Billie Joe Armstrong	Green Day	Saviors	2024		
"Favorite Son"	Billie Joe Armstrong	Green Day	"21 Guns"	2004	Japanese bonus track for American Idiot	
"Fell for You"	Billie Joe Armstrong	Green Day	¡Uno!	2012		
"Fever"	Billie Joe Armstrong	Green Day	Saviors	2024	Japanese bonus track	
"Fire, Ready, Aim"	Green Day		Father of All Motherfuckers	2019		
"Forever Now"	Billie Joe Armstrong	Green Day	Revolution Radio	2016		
"The Forgotten"	Billie Joe Armstrong	Green Day	¡Tré!	2012	Included on The Twilight Saga: Breaking Dawn – Part 2 soundtrack	
"Fuck Off"	Billie Joe Armstrong	Green Day	Saviors (édition de luxe)	2025		
"Fuck Time"	Billie Joe Armstrong	Green Day	¡Dos!	2012		
"Geek Stink Breath"	Billie Joe Armstrong	Green Day	Insomniac	1995		
"Give Me Novacaine"	Billie Joe Armstrong	Green Day	American Idiot	2004	Originally titled "Novacaine"	
Going to Pasalacqua	Green Day		39/Smooth	1990		
"Good Riddance (Time of Your Life)"	Billie Joe Armstrong	Green Day	Nimrod	1995	Alternate version appear on CD single "Brain Stew" / "Jaded"	
"Goodnight Adeline"	Billie Joe Armstrong	Green Day	Saviors	2024		
"Governator"	Mike Dirnt	Green Day	American Idiot	2004	Bonus track	
"Graffitia"	Green Day		Father of All Motherfuckers	2020		
Green Day	Green Day		39/Smooth	1990		
"The Grouch"	Billie Joe Armstrong	Green Day	Nimrod	1997		
"Ha Ha You're Dead"	Mike Dirnt	Green Day	Shenanigans	2002		
"Haushinka"	Billie Joe Armstrong	Green Day	Nimrod	1997		
"Having a Blast"	Billie Joe Armstrong	Green Day	Dookie	1994		
"Hearts Collide"	Billie Joe Armstrong	Green Day	"Know Your Enemy"	2009		
"Here Comes the Shock"			Single	2021		
"Hitchin' a Ride"	Billie Joe Armstrong	Green Day	Nimrod	1997		
"Hold On"	Billie Joe Armstrong	Green Day	Warning	2000		
"Holiday"	Billie Joe Armstrong	Green Day	American Idiot	2004		
"Holy Toledo!"			Single	2021	Featured in the movie Mark, Mary & Some Other People.	
"Homecoming" (Note: Separated into subtitles:I. "The Death of St. Jimmy" / II. "East 12th St. / III. "Nobody Likes You" (Mike Dirnt)/ IV. "Rock and Roll Girlfriend" (Tré Cool)/ V. "We're Coming Home Again")	Billie Joe Armstrong; Mike Dirnt; Tré Cool	Green Day	American Idiot	2004		
"Horseshoes and Handgrenades"	Billie Joe Armstrong	Green Day	21st Century Breakdown	2009		
"Hybrid Moments" † (Misfits cover)	Glenn Danzig			2011	Released as a video to Idiot Club members	
"Don't Want to Know If You Are Lonely" † (Hüsker Dü cover)	Grant Hart		"Warning" (single)	2000		
"I Fought the Law" † (The Crickets cover)	Sonny Curtis	The Crickets		2004		
"I Want to Be Alone"			The Big One compilation	1991		
"I Want to Be on T.V." † (Fang cover)	Same McBride; Tom Flynn		Geek Stink Breath	1995	Appears on Shenanigans	
"I Was a Teenage Teenager"	Green Day		Father of All Motherfuckers	2020		
I Was There	Green Day		39/Smooth	1990		
"In the End"	Billie Joe Armstrong	Green Day	Dookie	1994		
"J.A.R. (Jason Andrew Relva)"	Mike Dirnt	Green Day	Angus soundtrack	1995	Appears on International Superhits! and Dookie demo sessions	
"Jackass"	Billie Joe Armstrong	Green Day	Warning	2000		
"Jaded"	Billie Joe Armstrong	Green Day	Insomniac	1995		
"Jesus of Suburbia" (Note: Separated into subtitles:I. "Jesus of Suburbia" / II. "City of the Damned" / III. "I Don't Care" / IV. "Dearly Beloved" / V. "Tales of Another Broken Home")	Billie Joe Armstrong	Green Day	American Idiot	2004		
"Jinx"	Billie Joe Armstrong	Green Day	Nimrod	1997		
"The Judge's Daughter"	Green Day		39/Smooth	1990		
"Junkies on a High"	Green Day		Father of All Motherfuckers	2020		
"Kill the DJ"	Billie Joe Armstrong	Green Day; Mirwais Ahmadzaï	¡Uno!	2012		
"King for a Day"	Billie Joe Armstrong	Green Day	Nimrod	1997		
"Know Your Enemy"	Billie Joe Armstrong	Green Day	21st Century Breakdown	2009		
"Knowledge" † (Operation Ivy cover)	Jesse Michaels	Operation Ivy	Slappy (EP)	1990		
"Lady Cobra"	Billie Joe Armstrong	Green Day	¡Dos!	2012		
"Last Night on Earth"	Billie Joe Armstrong	Green Day	21st Century Breakdown	2009		
"Last of the American Girls"	Billie Joe Armstrong	Green Day	21st Century Breakdown	2009		
"Last Ride In"	Instrumental	Green Day	Nimrod	1997		
"Lazy Bones"	Billie Joe Armstrong	Green Day	¡Dos!	2012		
"Let Yourself Go"	Billie Joe Armstrong	Green Day	¡Uno!	2012		
"Letterbomb"	Billie Joe Armstrong	Green Day	American Idiot	2004	Originally titled "Clusterbomb"	
"Lights Out"	Billie Joe Armstrong	Green Day	21st Century Breakdown	2009	Bonus track	
"Like a Rolling Stone" † (Bob Dylan cover)	Bob Dylan		21st Century Breakdown	2009	Bonus track	
"A Little Boy Named Train"	Billie Joe Armstrong	Green Day	¡Tré!	2012		
"Living in the '20s"	Billie Joe Armstrong	Green Day	Saviors	2024		
"Longview"	Billie Joe Armstrong	Green Day	Dookie	1994		
"Look Ma, No Brains!"	Billie Joe Armstrong	Green Day	Saviors	2024		
"Loss of Control"	Billie Joe Armstrong	Green Day; Chrissie Hynde; James Honeyman-Scott	¡Uno!	2012	Originally titled "Crushing Bastards"	
"Macy's Day Parade"	Billie Joe Armstrong	Green Day	Warning	2000		
"Makeout Party"	Billie Joe Armstrong	Green Day	¡Dos!	2012		
"Maria"	Billie Joe Armstrong	Green Day	International Superhits!	2000	Demo version appears on "Waiting" single	
"Meet Me on the Roof"	Green Day		Father of All Motherfuckers	2020		
"Minority"	Billie Joe Armstrong	Green Day	Warning	2000		
"Misery"	Green Day		Warning	2000		
"Missing You"	Billie Joe Armstrong	Green Day	¡Tré!	2012		
"Murder City"	Billie Joe Armstrong	Green Day	21st Century Breakdown	2009	Originally titled "Desperate"	
"My Generation" † (The Who cover)	Pete Townshend		Sweet Children (EP)	1990	Appears on Kerplunk	
"Nice Guys Finish Last"	Billie Joe Armstrong	Green Day	Nimrod	1997		
"Nightlife"	Billie Joe Armstrong; Monica Painter	Green Day	¡Dos!	2012		
"No One Knows"	Billie Joe Armstrong	Green Day	Kerplunk	1991		
"No Pride"	Billie Joe Armstrong	Green Day	Insomniac	1995		
"Nuclear Family"	Billie Joe Armstrong	Green Day	¡Uno!	2012		
"Oh Love"	Billie Joe Armstrong	Green Day	¡Uno!	2012		
"Oh Yeah!"	Green Day; Gary Glitter; Mike Leander		Father of All Motherfuckers	2020	Originally titled "Bulletproof Backpack"; Samples "Do You Wanna Touch Me"	
"On the Wagon"	Billie Joe Armstrong	Green Day	"Longview"	1994	Appears on Shenanigans	
"One Eyed Bastard"	Billie Joe Armstrong	Green Day	Saviors	2024		
"One for the Razorbacks"	Billie Joe Armstrong	Green Day	Kerplunk	1991		
The One I Want	Billie Joe Armstrong	Green Day	1,000 Hours (EP)	1989		
"One of My Lies"	Billie Joe Armstrong	Green Day	Kerplunk	1991		
Only of You	Billie Joe Armstrong	Green Day	1,000 Hours (EP)	1989		
"Ordinary World"	Billie Joe Armstrong		Revolution Radio	2016		
"Outlaws"	Billie Joe Armstrong	Green Day; Jon Fratelli	Revolution Radio	2016		
"Outsider" † (Ramones cover)	Dee Dee Ramone		"Warning" (single)	2000	Appears on Shenanigans	
"Panic Song"	Mike Dirnt; Billie Joe Armstrong	Green Day	Insomniac	1995	Originally titled "Riot Song"	
"Paper Lanterns"	Billie Joe Armstrong	Green Day	Slappy (EP)	1990		
"Peacemaker"	Billie Joe Armstrong	Green Day	21st Century Breakdown	2009		
"Place Inside My Head"	Mike Dirnt	Green Day	Nimrod	1997	Demo from the Nimrod sessions, released on Nimrod (25th Anniversary edition)	
"Platypus (I Hate You)"	Billie Joe Armstrong	Green Day	Nimrod	1997		
"Pollyanna"			Single	2021		
"Poprocks and Coke"	Billie Joe Armstrong	Green Day	International Superhits!	2001		
"Private Ale"	Billie Joe Armstrong	Green Day	Kerplunk	1991		
"Prosthetic Head"	Billie Joe Armstrong	Green Day	Nimrod	1997		
"Pulling Teeth"	Billie Joe Armstrong	Green Day	Dookie	1994		
"A Quick One, While He's Away" † (The Who cover)	Pete Townshend		21st Century Breakdown	2009	Bonus track	
"Redundant"	Billie Joe Armstrong	Green Day	Nimrod	1997		
"Reject"	Billie Joe Armstrong	Green Day	Nimrod	1997		
Rest	Green Day		39/Smooth	1990		
"Restless Heart Syndrome"	Billie Joe Armstrong	Green Day	21st Century Breakdown	2009		
"Revolution Radio"	Billie Joe Armstrong	Green Day	Revolution Radio	2016		
Road to Acceptance	Green Day		39/Smooth	1990		
"Rotting"	Billie Joe Armstrong	Green Day	"Good Riddance (Time of Your Life)"	1997	Appears on Shenanigans	
"Rox Yer Ass"				1993	Appears on Life Without Spot: A Food Not Bombs Compilation and Dookie sessions. Originally titled "Monk's Keys"	
"Rusty James"	Billie Joe Armstrong	Green Day	¡Uno!	2012	Originally titled "Soda Pop Curtis"	
"St. Jimmy"	Billie Joe Armstrong	Green Day	American Idiot	2004		
"The Saints Are Coming" † (Skids cover) (Green Day and U2)	Richard Jobson; Stuart Adamson		U218 Singles	2006		
"Sassafras Roots"	Billie Joe Armstrong	Green Day	Dookie	1994		
"Saviors"	Billie Joe Armstrong	Green Day	Saviors	2024		
"Say Goodbye"	Billie Joe Armstrong	Green Day	Revolution Radio	2016		
"Scattered"	Billie Joe Armstrong	Green Day	Nimrod	1997		
"Scumbag"	Mike Dirnt	Green Day	"Warning" (single)	2000	Appears on Shenanigans	
"See the Light"	Billie Joe Armstrong	Green Day	21st Century Breakdown	2009		
"See You Tonight"	Billie Joe Armstrong	Green Day	¡Dos!	2012		
"Sex, Drugs & Violence"	Billie Joe Armstrong	Green Day	¡Tré!	2012		
"She"	Billie Joe Armstrong	Green Day	Dookie	1994		
"She's a Rebel"	Billie Joe Armstrong	Green Day	American Idiot	2004		
"Shoplifter"	Billie Joe Armstrong	Green Day	American Idiot	2004	Bonus track	
"Sick of Me"	Billie Joe Armstrong	Green Day	"Hitchin' a Ride"	1997	Appears on Shenanigans	
"The Simpsons Theme"	Danny Elfman		Non-album single (Note: Recorded for The Simpsons Movie)	2007		
"Smash It Like Belushi"	Billie Joe Armstrong	Green Day	Saviors (édition de luxe)	2025		
"Somewhere Now"	Billie Joe Armstrong	Green Day	Revolution Radio	2016		
"Song of the Century"	Billie Joe Armstrong	Green Day	21st Century Breakdown	2009		
"Stab You in the Heart"	Green Day		Father of All Motherfuckers	2020		
"State of Shock"	Billie Joe Armstrong	Green Day	Demolicious	2014		
"The Static Age"	Billie Joe Armstrong	Green Day	21st Century Breakdown	2009		
"Stay the Night"	Billie Joe Armstrong	Green Day	¡Uno!	2012		
"Stay Young"	Billie Joe Armstrong	Green Day	Saviors (édition de luxe)	2025		
"Still Breathing"	Billie Joe Armstrong	Green Day; Richard Parkhouse; Adam Slack; Luke Spiller; George Tizzard; Joshua Wilkinson	Revolution Radio	2016		
"Stop When the Red Lights Flash"	Billie Joe Armstrong	Green Day	¡Dos!	2012		
"Strange Days Are Here to Stay"	Billie Joe Armstrong	Green Day	Saviors	2024		
"Strangeland"	Billie Joe Armstrong	Green Day	Sweet Children (EP)	1990	Appears on Kerplunk	
"Stray Heart"	Billie Joe Armstrong	Green Day	¡Dos!	2012		
"Stuart and the Ave."	Billie Joe Armstrong	Green Day	Insomniac	1995		
"Stuck With Me"	Billie Joe Armstrong	Green Day	Insomniac	1995	Originally titled "Alright"	
"Suffocate"	Billie Joe Armstrong	Green Day	"Good Riddance (Time of Your Life)"	1997	Appears on Shenanigans	
"Sugar Youth"	Green Day		Father of All Motherfuckers	2020		
"Suzie Chapstick"	Billie Joe Armstrong	Green Day	Saviors	2024		
"Sweet Children"	Billie Joe Armstrong	Green Day	Sweet Children (EP)	1990	Appears on Kerplunk	
"Sweet 16"	Billie Joe Armstrong	Green Day	¡Uno!	2012		
"Take Back"	Billie Joe Armstrong	Green Day	Nimrod	1997		
"Take the Money and Crawl"	Green Day		Father of All Motherfuckers	2020		
"That's All Right" † (Elvis Presley cover)	Arthur Crudup		21st Century Breakdown	2009	Bonus track	
"Tight Wad Hill"	Billie Joe Armstrong	Green Day	Insomniac	1995		
"Tired of Waiting for You" † (The Kinks cover)	Ray Davies		"Basket Case"	1994	Appears on Shenanigans	
"Too Dumb to Die"	Billie Joe Armstrong	Green Day	Revolution Radio	2016		
"Too Much Too Soon"	Billie Joe Armstrong	Green Day	American Idiot	2004	Bonus track Originally, from Cigarettes and Valentines	
"Tre Polka"	Tré Cool	Green Day	Nimrod	1997	Demo from the Nimrod sessions, released on Nimrod (25th Anniversary edition)	
"Troubled Times"	Billie Joe Armstrong	Green Day	Revolution Radio	2016		
"Troublemaker"	Billie Joe Armstrong	Green Day	¡Uno!	2012		
"Underdog"	Billie Joe Armstrong	Green Day	Saviors (édition de luxe)	2025		
"Uptight"	Billie Joe Armstrong	Green Day	Nimrod	1997		
"¡Viva la Gloria!"	Billie Joe Armstrong	Green Day	21st Century Breakdown	2009		
"¿Viva La Gloria? (Little Girl)"	Billie Joe Armstrong	Green Day	21st Century Breakdown	2009		
"Waiting"	Billie Joe Armstrong	Green Day	Warning	2000		
"Wake Me Up When September Ends"	Billie Joe Armstrong	Green Day	American Idiot	2004		
"Walk Away"	Billie Joe Armstrong	Green Day	¡Tré!	2012		
"Walking the Dog" † (Rufus Thomas cover)	Rufus Thomas			1993	Demo from the Dookie sessions	
"Walking Alone"	Billie Joe Armstrong	Green Day	Nimrod	1997		
"Walking Contradiction"	Billie Joe Armstrong	Green Day	Insomniac	1995		
"Warning"	Billie Joe Armstrong	Green Day	Warning	2000		
"Welcome to Paradise"	Billie Joe Armstrong	Green Day	Kerplunk	1991	Original version	
"Welcome to Paradise"	Billie Joe Armstrong	Green Day	Dookie	1994	Re-recorded version	
"Westbound Sign"	Billie Joe Armstrong	Green Day	Insomniac	1995		
"What About Today"				2001	Released as an audio message in GreenDay.com	
"Whatsername"	Billie Joe Armstrong	Green Day	American Idiot	2004		
"When I Come Around"	Billie Joe Armstrong	Green Day	Dookie	1994		
"When It's Time"	Billie Joe Armstrong	Green Day	American Idiot: The Original Broadway Cast Recording	2010		
"Who Wrote Holden Caulfield?"	Billie Joe Armstrong	Green Day	Kerplunk	1991		
"Why Do You Want Him?"	Billie Joe Armstrong	Green Day	Slappy (EP)	1990		
"Why Does It Always Rain on Me?" † (Travis cover)	Fran Healy			2001		
"Wild One"	Billie Joe Armstrong	Green Day	¡Dos!	2012		
"Words I Might Have Ate"	Billie Joe Armstrong	Green Day	Kerplunk	1991		
"Working Class Hero" † (John Lennon cover)	John Lennon		Instant Karma: The Amnesty International Campaign to Save Darfur	2007		
"Worry Rock"	Billie Joe Armstrong	Green Day	Nimrod	1997		
"Wow! That's Loud"	Billie Joe Armstrong	Green Day	¡Dos!	2012		
"X-Kid"	Billie Joe Armstrong	Green Day	¡Tré!	2012		
"Xmas Time of the Year"	Billie Joe Armstrong	Green Day	Single	2015/2019	Released first on YouTube & on all streaming platforms as of 2019	
"You Irritate Me"	Billie Joe Armstrong	Green Day	Nimrod	1997	Demo from the Nimrod sessions, released on Nimrod (25th Anniversary edition)	
"You Lied"	Billie Joe Armstrong	Green Day	"Good Riddance (Time of Your Life)"	1997	Appears on Shenanigans	
"Youngblood"	Billie Joe Armstrong	Green Day	Revolution Radio	2016		

== Unreleased songs ==
Name of song, year recorded, and notes
Song	Year	Notes
"19th Nervous Breakdown" † (The Rolling Stones cover)	1997	From the Nimrod sessions. Re-recorded for the Cigarettes and Valentines sessions
"Alfred E. Normal"	1997	From the Nimrod sessions
"Alison" † (full band version, Elvis Costello cover)	1997	From the Nimrod sessions.
"Baby Blue"	2012	From the Trilogy sessions. Was later used for These Paper Bullets
"Billie Joe's Mom"	–	Played live in 1993. Written and performed by Tré Cool
"Blue Skies" † (Irving Berlin cover)	1994	From the Dookie sessions
"Boys in the Bathroom Stall"	2003	Posted as an audio message on GreenDay.com
"Can't Believe My Own Eyes"	2012	From the Trilogy sessions
"Cigarettes and Valentines" (Note: A live recording of this song was released on the band's live album Awesome as Fuck (2011). The official studio recording still remains unreleased.)	2003	From the Cigarettes and Valentines sessions
"Damn Juvenile Delinquents"	2020	From the Father of All Motherfuckers sessions
"David's Song"	–	Played live in 2004
"Death Wish Kids"	2020	From the Father of All Motherfuckers sessions
"Dream Catcher"	–	Performed at a soundcheck in 2010
"Dropout"	2000	From the Warning sessions. Re-recorded for the Cigarettes and Valentines sessions
"End of the World"	–	From the Cigarettes and Valentines sessions
"Forever Someday"	–	Played live in 1989
"Future Old Boy"	–	Played live in 1989. Real title unknown. Sometimes referred as "Jennifer"
"Gabriella"	2012	From the Trilogy sessions. Performed live at the Tiki Bar in 2011
"Goodbye to Romance" † (Ozzy Osbourne cover)	2012	From the Trilogy sessions. Not to be confused by the cover Billie Joe Armstrong's side project The Longshot recorded.
"Hard Times"	2012	From the Trilogy sessions
"Hello Firecracker"	2012	From the Trilogy sessions
"Hotfoot Jamboree"	2012	From the Trilogy. Heard in ¡Cuatro!
"Idiot"	1997	From the Nimrod sessions
"I'm Alright"	2012	From the Trilogy sessions
"Jezebel"	2012	From the Trilogy sessions
"Lately (One More Year)"	–	From the Cigarettes and Valentines sessions
"Life Is So Plain"	2012	From the Trilogy sessions
"Minnesota Girl"	2001	Posted as an audio message on GreenDay.com, and also performed live in 2002 and 2009
"Monk's Keys"	–	Demo recorded in 1993
"Oh Girl"	–	Performed at a soundcheck in 2010
"Olivia"	–	Played live in 2010
"Ruby Mae"	2012	From the Trilogy. Heard in ¡Cuatro!
"Santa Claus Is Comin' to Town" †	2001	Posted as an audio message on GreenDay.com
"Satellite"	2012	From the Trilogy sessions
"Schnickelfritz"	2024	From the Saviors sessions
"Second Time Around"	2002	Posted as an audio message on GreenDay.com
"She Brought Me Water"	–	Demo recorded in 1988
"Sleepyhead"	2000	From the Warning sessions. Re-recorded for the Cigarettes and Valentines sessions.
"Slow"	1997	From the Nimrod sessions
"Stay"	1988	Demo recorded at 924 Gilman Street. Previously known as "World vs. World" until its title was confirmed by John Kiffmeyer in 2017
"Things I Heard Today"	2001	Posted as an audio message on GreenDay.com
"Tony the Tiger"	1997	From the Nimrod sessions. Played live once in July 1997
"Too Young"	–	From the Cigarettes and Valentines sessions
"Ugly Day"	1997	From the Nimrod sessions
"Wasteaway"	2000	From the Warning sessions. Re-recorded for the Cigarettes and Valentines sessions.
"Welcome"	2004	From the American Idiot sessions
"What About Today?"	2001	Posted as an audio message on GreenDay.com
"When You're Near"	–	Played live in 1989
"Wonderful"	2009	From the 21st Century Breakdown sessions
"You Can't Fool Me"	–	Played live in 1989
