= Amalgamation (names) =

Name formed by combining several previously existing names

An amalgamated name is a name that is formed by combining several previously existing names. These may take the form of an acronym (where only one letter of each name is taken) or a blend (where a large part of each name is taken, such as the first syllable).

Amalgamated names are most commonly used for amalgamated businesses, characters and places. Newly arising partnerships may also choose to name themselves by amalgamating their names.

== Examples ==
- Grevan Spiridellis, screen name crediting both Greg and Evan Spiridellis
- DHL, originally meaning Dalsey, Hillblom and Lynn
- Grant Naylor, a production company founded by Rob Grant and Doug Naylor
- ABC region, area in Greater São Paulo named after Santo André, São Bernardo do Campo, and São Caetano do Sul. This is also used for Aruba, Bonaire and Curaçao in ABC islands (Lesser Antilles) and for Admiralty Island, Baranof Island and Chichagof Island in ABC islands (Alaska).
- ExxonMobil, a combination of the companies Exxon and Mobil created when the two oil companies merged in 1999.
- Goldwyn Pictures, a motion picture production company founded by Samuel Goldfish (later Goldwyn) in partnership with Edgar and Archibald Selwyn
- TriBeCa, a neighborhood in Lower Manhattan, New York in the United States. Its name is an acronym composed of the words "Triangle below Canal Street". Also in Manhattan are SoHo (from "South of Houston street"), NoHo (North of Houston Street), NoLIta (North of Little Italy, Manhattan) and NoMad (North of Madison Square); on the other hand, DUMBO (Down Under the Manhattan Bridge Overpass) is in Brooklyn.
- Stockard Channing, stage and screen name of Susan Stockard and her married name of Channing (the first, from 1963 to 1967, of four marriages)
- AZ, a Dutch football club that was formed in 1967 with the merger of two other clubs, Alkmaar '54 and FC Zaanstreek
- 1,039/Smoothed Out Slappy Hours, a 1991 compilation album by Green Day, combining their debut album, 39/Smooth, their 1990 EP Slappy and their 1989 EP 1000 Hours. This is often regarded as Green Day's debut album.
- Brangelina, a celebrity supercouple consisting of American actors Brad Pitt and Angelina Jolie, combining part of their names, Brad and Angelina.
- Renesmee Cullen, is the name given to Twilight Saga protagonist Bella Swan's daughter. It is the blend of Bella's mother name, Renee, and her husband Edward Cullen's adoptive mother, Esme.
- Jalen Rose, sports analyst and former NBA player who is named after his father and uncle James and Leonard, respectively, and has inspired a trend of young athletes named after him.
- UC Sampdoria, football club, merging of Sampierdarenese and Andrea Doria.

== Linguistics ==
Amalgamation is also a term used in linguistics when a compound contains roots from several languages, without it being part of a blended language. For example, a word with an English and a Spanish root would not be an amalgam, if part of Spanglish, while an English word with a Greek and a Latin root would. This is also known as a hybrid word.
