= Say What You Want (disambiguation) =

"Say What You Want" is a song by the Scottish band Texas.

Say What You Want may also refer to:

- "Say What You Want" (Barenaked Ladies song)
- "Powerless (Say What You Want)", a song by Nelly Furtado
- "Say What You Want", a song by Adina Howard from The Second Coming (Adina Howard album)
- "Say What You Want", a song by Andy Bell from Non-Stop (Andy Bell album)
- "Say What You Want", a song by Bridge to Grace from Origins (Bridge to Grace album)
- "Say What You Want", a song by Babes in Toyland from the soundtrack of S.F.W.
- "Say What You Want", a song by the DeeKompressors from the soundtrack of Sorority Row
- "Say What You Want", a song by Face to Face from Protection (Face to Face album)
- "Say What You Want", a song by Freya Lim from Holding Back the Tears
- "Say What You Want", a song by Hi-Fives from And a Whole Lotta You!
- "Say What You Want", a song by Hotwire from The Routine (album)
- "Say What You Want", a song by Lateef the Truthspeaker from Firewire (Lateef the Truthspeaker album)
- "Say What You Want", a song by Man Alive from Live at the Sydney Opera House (Morgan Evans album)
- "Say What You Want", a song by Morgan Evans from Open Surgery
- "Say What You Want", a song by Neck Deep from Wishful Thinking (Neck Deep album)
- "Say What You Want", a song by Night Ranger from Don't Let Up
- "Say What You Want", a song by the Prom from In This Way They Found Me
- "Say What You Want", a song by Rosie Thomas from If Songs Could Be Held
- "Say What You Want", a song by Samantha Fox from 21st Century Fox (album)
- "Say What You Want", a song by Sarah Blasko from Eternal Return (Sarah Blasko album)
- "Say What You Want", a song by Sheryl Crow from 100 Miles from Memphis
- "Say What You Want", a song by the Tubes from Genius of America
- "Say What You Want", a song by White Denim from Fits (album)
- "Say What You Want", a song by Carmen and Camille
- "Say What You Want", a song by Dear Seattle
- "Say What You Want", a song by Ian Carey
- "Say What You Want", a song by John de Sohn
- "Say What You Want", a song by Koven (group)
- "Say What You Want", a song by Shakatak
- "Say What You Want", a song by Shallow Pools
- "Say What You Want", a song by Slot Machine (band)
- "Say What You Want", a song by Stacy Clark
- "Say What You Want", a song by Thin Lizard Dawn
- "Say What You Want", a song by Siza featuring Eugy
- Say What You Want, an album by Bob Thompson (pianist)
- Say What You Want, an album by Famous Dex
- Say What You Want, an album by Goodnight Lights
- Say What You Want, an EP by Goldie Boutilier
- "Say What You Want", an episode of Bruh (TV series)
- "Say What You Want", an episode of Makutano Junction
- "Say What Ya Want", a song by Craig G from This Is Now!!!
- "Sag was du willst", in English "Say What You Want", a song by Joachim Witt from Pop (Joachim Witt album)
