= Kerplunk (album) =

1991 studio album by Green Day

Studio album by Green Day
- Released: December 17, 1991 (UK); January 17, 1992 (US)
- Recorded: May and September 1991
- Studios: Art of Ears, San Francisco, California
- Genres: Pop-punk; punk rock
- Length: 33:56 (LP); 42:06 (CD)
- Label: Lookout
- Producers: Andy Ernst; Green Day

Green Day chronology
1,039/Smoothed Out Slappy Hours (1991)	Kerplunk (1991)	Dookie (1994)

Kerplunk (stylized as Kerplunk!) (Note: Stylization of the album's title as Kerplunk!, with the exclamation point, has been used by Green Day biographers Gillian G. Gaar, Ben Myers and Marc Spitz. It is also listed as such on the back cover and labels of the vinyl version.) is the second studio album by the American rock band Green Day. It was released on December 17, 1991 in the United Kingdom and formally released in the United States on January 17, 1992, by Lookout! Records. It is the band's first album to feature drummer Tré Cool, replacing original drummer John Kiffmeyer, who left the band to attend college following a US tour promoting their debut studio album 39/Smooth (1990). In May 1991, they decamped to Art of Ears Studios in San Francisco, California, to record their next album with Andy Ernst, who co-produced the sessions with band. Six songs were recorded until the proceedings stopped in order for Green Day to resume touring, returning to the studio in September 1991 to finish the work.

Characterized as a pop-punk and punk rock album, the songs on Kerplunk dealt with love and frontman Billie Joe Armstrong's subconscious. Some of the tracks also tackled the theme of boredom, while others focused on alienation. The artwork for the album was created by Chris Appelgren and Pat Hynes, based on a story written by Lookout founder Larry Livermore. It follows a girl who is obsessed with Green Day, eventually getting arrested by its end for murdering her parents. Prior to the album being released, the band embarked on a three-month European tour that began in late 1991. During the trek, Armstrong was suffering from a mental health issue; despite this, bassist Mike Dirnt said it became a bonding experience for the three members. Kerplunk rode on the success of Nevermind (1991) by Nirvana, with some commenters seeing Green Day as the next Nirvana.

Kerplunk was met with a positive response from critics, with a selection of them highlighting Cool's addition to their sound. Some reviews commented on the overall songwriting, while others talked about the diverse aspects of the album's sound. Due to pre-orders by record stores in the United Kingdom, the album sold 10,000 copies on its first day of release, ultimately becoming the biggest-selling release on Lookout Records. The success of their next studio album, Dookie (1994), helped the sales of Kerplunk, as it topped the Billboard Top Pop Catalog Albums chart. With it having sold four million copies worldwide as of January 2017, it was certified platinum in the US and gold in the UK. Several songs from the album have appeared on best-of tracks lists for the band by publications such as Kerrang! and PopMatters, while many of the tracks have been covered for various artist compilations.

== Background ==
Green Day released their debut studio album 39/Smooth in April 1990 through Lookout Records. The band promoted it with a 45-date tour in the United States, which began in June 1990. Though the trek was seen as a success by the band, drummer John Kiffmeyer did not want to go through it again and decided to enroll in Humboldt State College in Arcata, California later in the year. He did not outright tell them that he was departing. Vocalist and guitarist Billie Joe Armstrong was surprised by this as he only found out through a friend. Afterwards, he was unsure if he wanted to continue the band, until he remembered Tré Cool and learned that he was free. Cool had been playing with the Lookouts since he was 12, and worked with Armstrong earlier in July 1990 when the Lookouts were recording new material.

With Cool, Green Day played a show in November 1990; while Kiffmeyer drummed with them for two more shows during this time, they thought Cool was a better musician and wanted someone that could play with them more often. The new line-up bonded over smoking pot, something that Kiffmeyer did not partake in. Kiffmeyer ultimately played with them for the November 1990 show, a decision that made Armstrong and Dirnt realize that they could not progress with him in the band. Armstrong found it difficult to be the band's leader as Kiffmeyer was older and had more experience as a musician. The following shows at 924 Gilman Street brought a new audience, teenage girls from suburban towns. (Note: Patrick Hynes, staff member at Lookout Records recalled that high school girls who were not into punk rock began to appear at Green Day's shows. Spitz, in his book Nobody Likes You – Inside the Turbulent Life, Times and Music of Green Day (2006), wrote that the trio of Armstrong, Cool and Dirnt were teenagers, which gave them a "sort of universal teen appeal" that they did not have with Kiffmeyer in the line-up. Spitz went on to say that with the rare exceptions like Generation X frontman Billy Idol, punk musicians were not "crush worthy. Green Day embodied that 'so homely they're adorable' appeal that has created unlikely heartthrobs" in musicians such as Frank Sinatra and the Beatles drummer Ringo Starr.)

== Recording and production ==
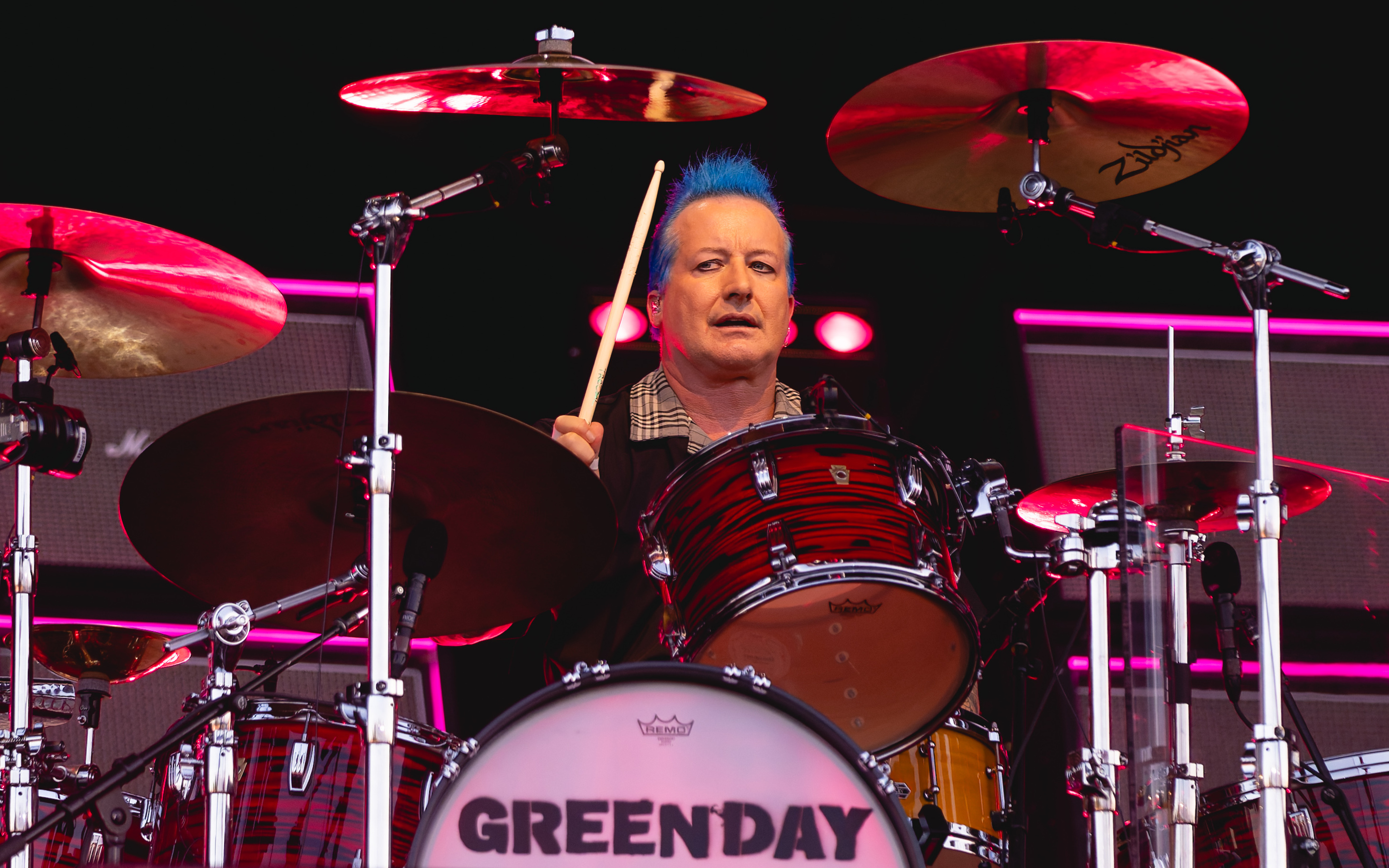
Kerplunk is the first Green Day album to feature drummer Tré Cool (pictured in 2024).

By the time Green Day started recording with Cool, Armstrong had amassed a collection of songs, having documented some with his four-track recorder at his home, with others having been worked on during their shows. Lookout Records founder Larry Livermore was insistent on the band recording again, especially as they were eager to showcase Cool's talents as a drummer. They went to Art of Ears Studios in San Francisco, California, in May 1991, as it was an inexpensive facility. The minor success of 39/Smooth meant that the budget for their new album had risen to $2,000.00. Andy Ernst, who previously worked on 39/Smooth, returned to co-produce the sessions with the members of Green Day.

The proceedings ended abruptly after six tracks had been tracked, when they had no more material and had to continue touring. Because of their slowly rising popularity, the band had to spend more time playing shows. Green Day abandoned the demos they had recorded and opted to re-record them, ultimately returning to the studio in September 1991 to complete the album. Four days collectively were spent recording, before it was mixed by Ernst, who also served as the engineer. Livermore was unaware of the finished album until the band gave him a tape of it in late 1991 and told him it was going to be titled Kerplunk. John Golden mastered the album at K-Disc in Hollywood, California. When Livermore was flying home from the mastering, he listened to the tape and thought that "life was never going to be the same again for Lookout Records or Green Day."

== Composition and lyrics ==
Ben Myers, in his book Green Day: American Idiots & The New Punk Explosion (2006), wrote that the album's title, Kerplunk, was a reference to the skill game KerPlunk, while Marc Spitz said there was a higher possibility that it alluded to the noise stemming from when a person defecates from an elevated position. Spitz reasoned that as with 39/Smooth before it, the divide separating the "scatological and the dreamy is exceedingly thin but with Kerplunk! it starts to feel like an actual sensibility as opposed to a symptom of arrested adolescence." There is an emphasis on love songs and Armstrong exploring his subconscious throughout the album, with boredom being touched upon in "Christie Rd." and "Private Ale".

Gillian G. Gaar, in her book Green Day – Rebels with a Cause (2006), felt that the album's strength lied in its introspective theme, heard in the likes of "One of My Lies", "Android" and "No One Knows", tackling getting older and mortality. Myers said Armstrong created a type of "youthful street poetry" with the lyrics, commenting on difficult topics of "alienation and disappointment in an accessible and empathetic manner in songs that may sound inordinately simple, yet contain a sense of style and intelligence." Kerplunk has largely been tagged as pop-punk and punk rock, with some calling it indie punk and indie rock. Additionally, Loudwire categorized the album as representing scene music. The band wrote almost all of the music for the album, except for "2000 Light Years Away", where it is credited to by Green Day, Jesse Michaels of Operation Ivy, Pete Rypins of Crimpshrine and Dave E.C. of Filth.

=== Songs ===
Gaar noted that there was a definable Green Day sound to Kerplunk that 39/Smooth lacked, encapsulated by its opening track "2000 Light Years Away". PopMatters contributor Chris Conaton explained this as Armstrong's guitar work being straightforward "but catchy, and Dirnt echoes them without exactly doubling them. Cool keeps the beat steady but throws in exciting fills throughout, too, with pounding crash cymbals and tight snare rolls." Instead of it having a guitar solo following the second verse, emphasis is placed on Dirnt's bassline, which repeats the bassline heard in the rest of the song, something he felt as an interesting decision. The song is inspired by Adrienne Nesser, who Armstrong met while the band were in Minneapolis, Minnesota. The narrator sings about a girl that he misses a lot despite not knowing her that well. (Note: Jason Heller of The A.V. Club commented that it also dealt with being bored and suffering from loneliness, which would reappear as a topic in "Longview" (1994) two years later.) "One for the Razorbacks" tackles the theme of insanity, with the narrator attempting to console his friend who is going through heartbreak.

"Welcome to Paradise" was inspired by a warehouse above a brothel in West Oakland, Oakland, California. Armstrong was squatting at this place, located on the corner of West 7th and Peralta, with Dirnt in 1989. Myers said the song glamorized the dilapidation of the build and the emotions behind living on one's own for the first time in their life. Gaar noted that during the instrumental break, there was a descending riff which "built in intensity each time it repeated, cracking with all the force of a tightly controlled whip." Partridge said Armstrong's idea of "paradise" is intended as being both "sincerely and facetiously", and he added that the break served to represent a "mix of fear and excitement". It would later be re-recorded for the band's third album, Dookie (1994), and released as a single.

Erica Paleno, Armstrong's first serious partner, said "Christie Rd." was about her sneaking out of the house after being grounded by her mother, only to meet Armstrong at local train tracks. Myers saw it as an observation on streetlife, where Armstrong summarized living in Oakland, "in what sounds like a sequel to the 'Dear Mother ...' letter-writing tone of 'Welcome to Paradise.'" Gaar said the namesake road could be found on the outskirts of Rodeo, close to some train tracks. Nina Corcoran of Consequence said that loitering around tracks was typically a way of staving off boredom, but for Armstrong, it felt like the choice of a person seeking a "place of solace, where loneliness switches to intentional solitude and the drone of daily life complements the sunset."

With "Private Ale", Armstrong talks about a girl he noticed on the street. "Dominated Love Slave" features Cool on vocals, emulating a bumpkin discussing power tools and sadomasochism. Gaar said these topics were undermined by the backing of country and western music. Billboard writer Kenneth Partridge read "One of My Lies" as being about mortality and questioning the existence of God, while Conaton saw it as dealing with the "invincibility of youth and realizing that [Armstrong's] actually vulnerable." Nesser also served as Armstrong's muse for "80", the title of which was in reference to his nickname for her, Adie. In the song, Armstrong confuses his anxiety with the emotions of experiencing love. It evoked "Promises Promises" (1978) by Generation X. With "Android", Armstrong contemplates either becoming homeless or dying at an early age, alongside a metaphor for dope smoking.

"No One Knows" is a slower song that touches on melancholy, with a higher emphasis placed on Armstrong and Dirnt's vocal harmonies during the chorus sections. It also talks about being unsure of the future and handling regret. It starts with a relaxed but complex solo from Dirnt. Conaton said the band use the downbeat nature to their advantage, keeping it a slow pace while retaining the distorted guitar parts. (Note: Paste's Reed Strength remarked that the sensitive tone of the lyrics to "No One Knows", which discuss alienation and dealing with isolation, said in a sweeping vocal tonality presages "Boulevard of Broken Dreams" (2004) over a decade later.) "Who Wrote Holden Caulfield?" alludes to Holden Caulfield in The Catcher in the Rye (1951) by J.D. Salinger. Armstrong said while at high school, his teachers attempted to make him read the book, though he did not do so until much later. Gaar wrote that the song talks about being a person being unhappy with his surroundings, yet not having the willpower to fix them. (Note: Gaar said "Longview" also echoed this theme, though that one is sung from a first person perspective, while "Who Wrote Holden Caulfield?" is from another person observing them. Kerrang!'s Sam Law said The Catcher in the Rye was later influence for their seventh studio album, American Idiot (2004). Green Day's labelmates Screeching Weasel included a track titled "I Wrote Holden Caulfield" on their album How to Make Enemies and Irritate People (1994) in direct response to "Who Wrote Holden Caulfield?".) Kerplunk concludes with "Words I Might Have Ate", a folk punk song, where Armstrong plays an acoustic guitar, and Cool plays his drum kit softer than usual.

== Artwork ==
Artwork for the past releases were done by Michaels and Cometbus editor Aaron Cometbus, both of whom were unavailable for Kerplunk. Chris Appelgren and Pat Hynes joined Lookout Records as artists by this time and were both employed to make the artwork for it. Inspired by fanzine creator Janelle Hessig, who went to the same high school as Armstrong and Dirnt, Pinole Valley, served as inspiration for a fictional story by Livermore. Told from the perspective of teenage girl Laurie L., he came up with the story in an hour. It follows her showing up at Green Day concerts, which annoyed "macho punk boys, who hated seeing their beloved pit being taken over by girls who were there to dance and show their love for the band ..." Livermore explained that the music that his label issued was for a wider audience, not solely for aggressive male punk fans. In addition, he did not appreciate the way women and girls were being treated at the band's shows.

In the story, titled My Adventure with Green Day, Laurie L. is the winner of a competition to get a date with Green Day. In lieu of missing this opportunity, she murders both of her parents. While she travels to see the band, allusions are made to the band, such as Telegraph Avenue in Oakland. It concludes with her being arrested prior to Green Day making an appearance, ending with the line, "Everyone's got two parents but there's only one Green Day!" Myers said Livermore's story connected to the theme of alienation found on the album and in The Catcher in the Rye, while its exaggerated mood was an obvious criticism of a frenzied fanbase. Livermore said she subsequently became the girl on the artwork for Kerplunk, where she is seen holding a smoking gun while smirking. As Livermore could not draw, he detailed the character to Appelgren, who made the cover.

Livermore said it was not known "whether the girl on the cover and the notorious Laurie L. are one and the same. But I think it's safe to say they're kindred spirits." The story was ultimately included on the lyric sheet included in each copy of the album. The back of the sleeve shows a person bleeding on the ground. As a result, Kerplunk was banned from certain stores because of the artwork. Gaar felt that this "mock celebration of violence" recalled the one detailed in the liner notes for The Rolling Stones No. 2 (1965) by the Rolling stones, where their manager promotes robbery in order to get money to buy the album. The "thanks" credit list named various individuals connected with the music scene in the East Bay, such as the Gilman club, photographer Murray Bowles, Nesser and the members' respective parents. The album is overall dedicated to Dirnt's late cat, Gravy, while Kiffmeyer is given an executive producer credit.

== Release ==
=== European tour and pre-release ===
As copies of Kerplunk were being pressed, the members of Green Day were readying themselves for a trek in Europe. Up to this point, the band's past releases were difficult to acquire in the US and even more so in Europe, where they had to be obtained via mail-order from the US. The tour began in November 1991, and lasted for over three months split across 64 dates. They self-funded the stint after corralling the royalty checks they received from Lookout and from the profit they made on prior US tours. Livermore had put Green Day in contact with two promoters located in the UK, Christy Colcord and Aidan Taylor, both of whom booked the shows for it. The venues they played ranged from music clubs to squats, with the band borrowing gear from the acts they were performing alongside; attendance figures bounced between 50 and 500 people. In order to make T-shirts to sell, they brought the photo negative with them and had shirts screen printed in Germany. The tour initially saw them play shows in the Netherlands, Germany, Spain, Italy, Poland, the Czech Republic, the UK and Ireland. (Note: Throughout the UK portion, Green Day played shows alongside Thatcher on Acid, Goober Patrol Jailcell Recipes, Angus Bagpipe, Couch Potato and Wat Tyler. In the lead up to Christmas 1991, Green Day played a show at TJ's in Newport, Wales. The live rendition of "At the Library" from this show appeared on a fanzine compilation, S&M 001 (1995).)

As part of the UK dates in December 1991, they performed in Southampton on the 17th, where they received copies of Kerplunk. In response, the band opted to make the show a record release party, though the album's formal release was not until the following month. Livermore was unsure of the album's exact release date, thinking it was early 1992, until Armstrong reminded him that he had shown up to the December 1991 UK tour with 300 copies of Kerplunk in tow. Lookout Records was working with distributor Mordam Records for their releases; Mordam founder Ruth Schwartz cautioned against Livermore ordering 10,000 copies of the album, telling him that he was insane for making that many. This figure was double the label's typical allotment, which was reasoned for Green Day's increasing popularity. It was during this time of the year where little activity was happening in the music industry, and as a result, Schwartz said issuing an album in December would have little impact. Livermore told her that if Lookout does not sell all 10,000 that month, they would sell them the following month, "Punks don't follow the record industry calendar." Schwartz responded to this by stating, "Come back and tell me that when we have to move out of our warehouse because it's filled with your unsold records."

The European tour was planned to only be for 50 shows, until it was extended for 64 as they kept receiving offers for more gigs. Armstrong said that despite their exhaustion, to the point of having hallucinations, they agreed to keep the trek going. When the band were playing in Spain, Armstrong was having a mental health issue: "I don't know if I was having an anxiety attack or what, but I just freaked out! I didn't say anything to anybody. It was weird." In a different interview, he said he was unsure about his future, not aided by visiting Europe for the first time, which he found to be unnerving. Dirnt said the three month trek became a bonding experience for the three of them, "I don't think we were a tight band before we were there, but all of a sudden something clicked."

=== Promotion and other tours ===
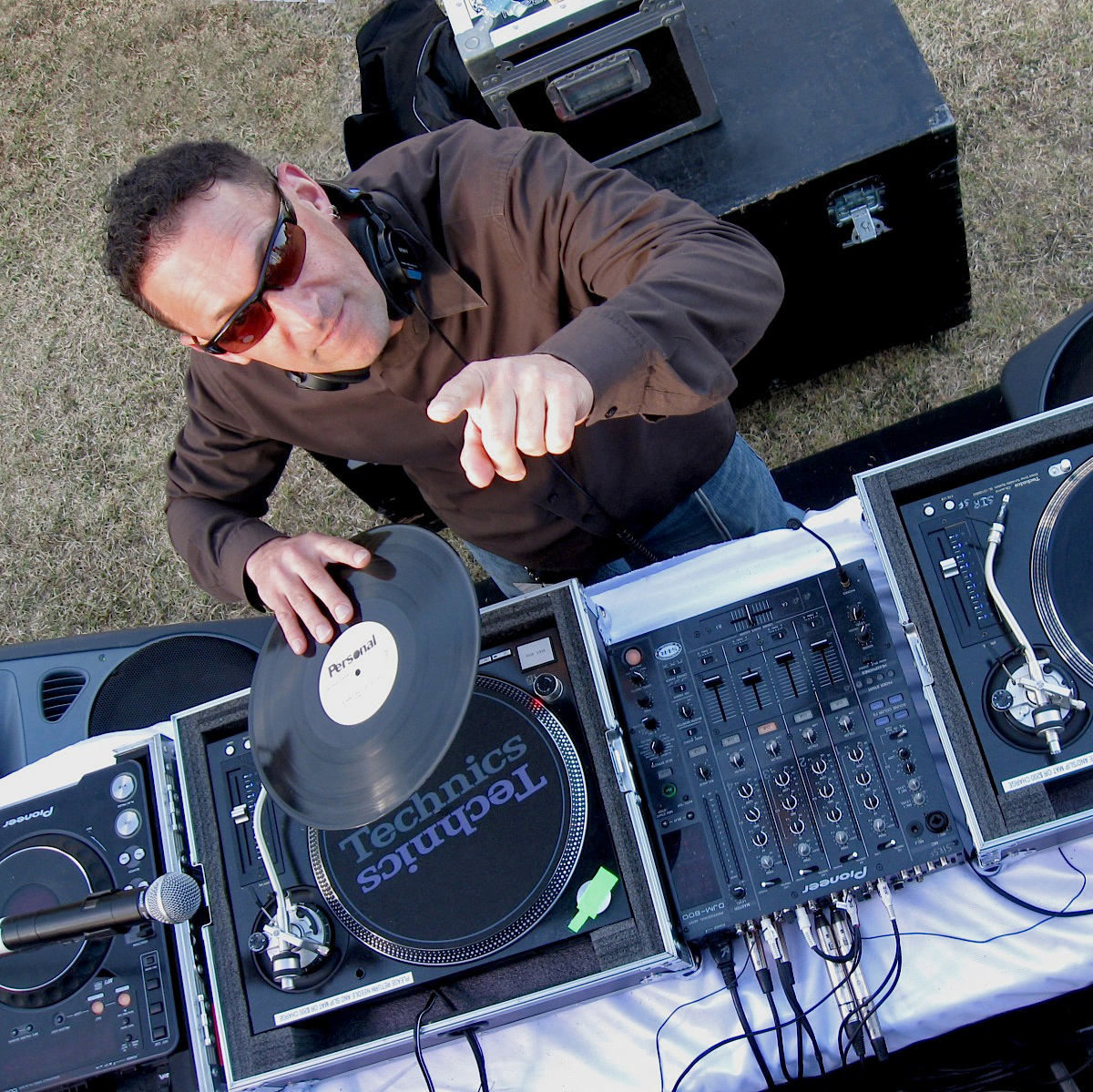
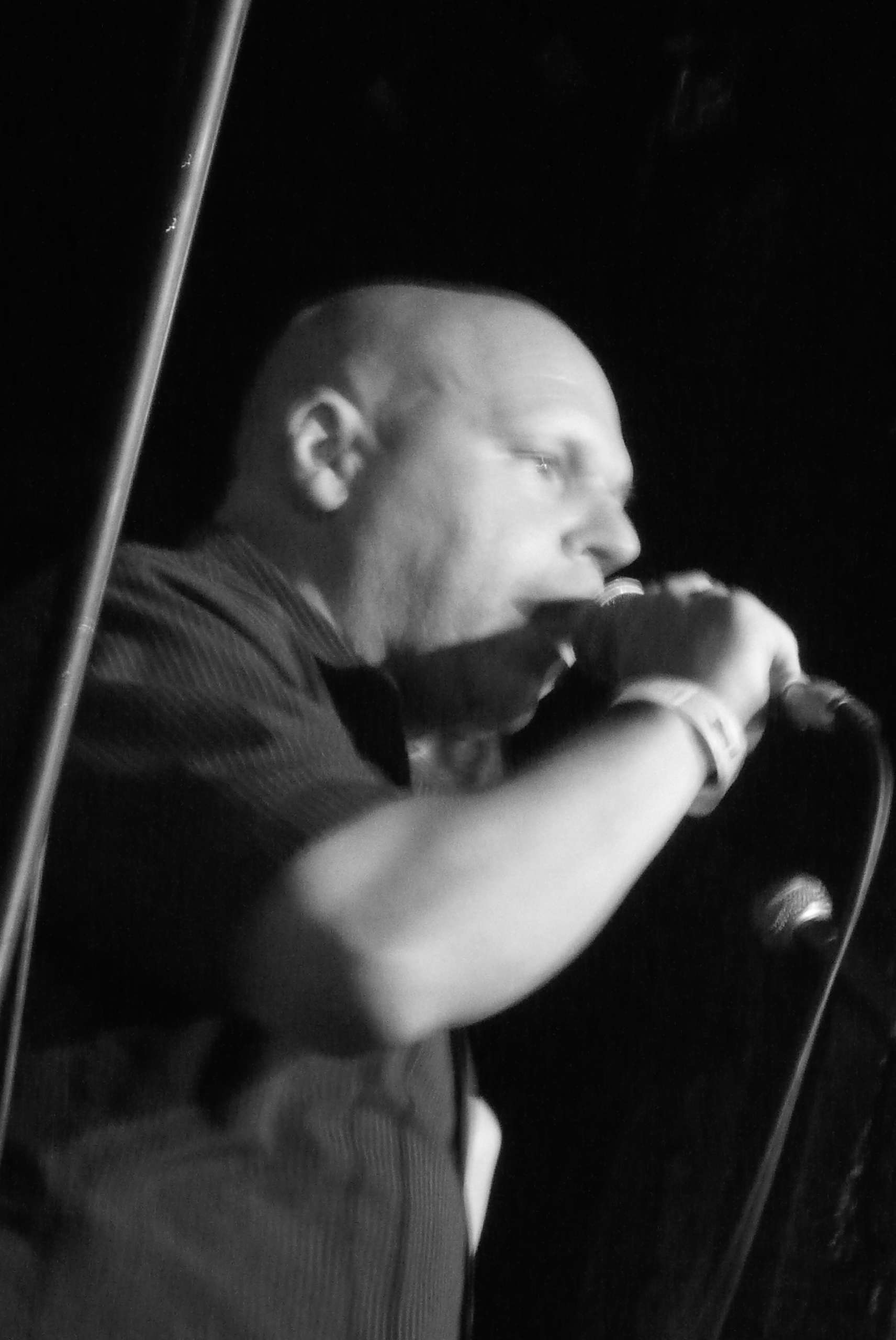
Radio personnel Steve Masters (left) and Matt Pinfield (right) helped push the reach of Green Day at college radio stations.

Kerplunk was released in the United Kingdom on December 17, 1991, and later on cassette and CD on January 17, 1992. For the CD version, Lookout Records attached the Sweet Children (1990) EP to it as bonus tracks. (Note: When Green Day were on their US tour promoting 39/Smooth, they played a show in Minnesota, where Saint Paul-based Skene! Records invited them to record some tracks. Instead of working on new material, the band opted to tackle earlier material, and due to its audio quality, fans mistakenly thought it was their first release.) By this point, the band had returned to the US. At this stage, Nevermind (1991) by Nirvana had become a major success, and as Myers notes, it made the "seemed to make the melodic Beatles-conscious punk rock that Green Day had been defiantly pursuing for years extremely marketable." Livermore was dismissive of Nirvana and their ilk, saying they were barely connected to punk rock, and had minor or zero connection to what was occurring around the Bay Area. Spitz commented that it was obvious to people that championed Green Day that they were on track for bigger success. With the aid of press coverage, airplay from radio and sales of the album, people viewed the band as the next Nirvana.

Heller referred to 1992 as the year of a resurgence in punk, in reference to the documentary 1991: The Year Punk Broke (1992). He went on to list Green Day, Jawbreaker, NOFX, among other punk acts, as artists that issued classic albums that same year, releases which bolstered a music scene that was regarded as declining. Due to the royalties from the sales of Kerplunk, Green Day were able to get a better vehicle for transport, a converted Bookmobile, and both Armstrong and Dirnt acquired new gear. They subsequently went on a US cross-country trek, where they played bigger venues such as Los Angeles, California's Whisky a Go Go and San Francisco, California's Slim's. Hype surrounding the band meant that said venues were at full capacity during shows. Staff at Lookout were bewildered by the band, with roadies informing them of bigger crowds of 300 people in places the band had only previously drew a crowd of 30.

College radio stations helped in the band's reach, with assistance of San Francisco radio music director Steve Masters and New Jersey DJ Matt Pinfield. Green Day soon returned overseas, playing a show in London in May 1992. Cometbus said crowd sizes were swelling, while the promoters appeared more sleazy and Green Day's success was rising, though had stalled. Some gigs were forced to be called off due to high attendee figures for venues that were not adequately sized to handle them. On a few occasions, the resident fire marshal shut down the shows, while in other instances, more prominent promotes took control of the gigs and stole the band's money. Alongside these issues, the personality of the crowds shifted, as Dirnt said that fights often broke out from attendees who did not 'get' punk shows. Members of Green Day, despite their bellowing success, spent time playing with other acts around this time, such as Armstrong with Pinhead Gunpowder and Rancid.

=== Related events and releases ===
Following this, the band signed to major label Reprise Records in early 1993. "Welcome to Paradise" was re-recorded for Green Day's major label debut, Dookie; on the same album, "Sassafras Roots" evoked the sound of Kerplunk. A remix of "2000 Light Years Away", by Jerry Finn and Rob Cavallo, was included on the soundtrack to The Jerky Boys: The Movie (1995). Despite no singles being issued from Kerplunk, the band's fanbase latched on to "2000 Light Years Away" and "Christie Rd.". As such, the latter of these was pressed on a seven-inch vinyl record, with "One of My Lies", "One for the Razorbacks" and a live version of "One of My Lies" as the B-sides, as part of the Ultimate Collectors 7" Vinyl Singles Box Set (2009) collection.

"2000 Light Years Away" was later included on their greatest hits compilation, Greatest Hits: God's Favorite Band (2017). They also released a music video for it, featuring archival footage of the band's early shows, to promote the compilation. In late 2005, citing a royalty dispute, the band took control of their Lookout Records-era releases, including Kerplunk, the compilation album 1,039/Smoothed Out Slappy Hours, and the 1,000 Hours (1989) and Slappy (1990) EPs. Fellow independent label Epitaph Records subsequently reissued the album in 2008, until Reprise Records did the same the following year. In the lead up to the Green Day: Rock Band (2010) video game, Cool said that while the master tapes for Kerplunk still exist, the process to digitize them would destroy the tape given their age.

== Critical reception ==
Professional ratings
Review scores
Source	Rating
AllMusic	4/5 stars
Alternative Press	3.5/5 stars
Christgau's Consumer Guide	(2-star Honorable Mention)
The Encyclopedia of Popular Music	3/5 stars
Pitchfork	8.5/10
The New Rolling Stone Album Guide	3/5 stars

Kerplunk was received positively; coverage was largely relegated to fanzines such as Flipside and Maximum Rocknroll. Myers said the consensus was that the album was an upgrade from their previous work. Strength credited this evolution to Cool, saying that since his addition, the "overall finesse of the group as a punk rock band is noticeably better." Conaton said Cool hit it off with Armstrong and Dirnt immediately as the songs on Kerplunk "stand shoulder to shoulder with anything else the band created in the future ..." Alternative Press writer Jesse Raub said Cool and Dirnt served as the band's "secret weapon—a solid rhythm section ..." AllMusic reviewer Ned Raggett echoed this, adding that Cool displays a little "bit more flash and ability than John Kiffmeyer did. Together the two throw in a variety of guitarless breaks that would later help to define the band's sound for many -- warm and never letting the beat go." Pitchfork contributor Jess Harvell commented that the band learned that they altered the tempo during the bridge sections and "strip things back to just Dirnt and new drummer Tre Cool, it makes the push of the final chorus that much more exciting." A writer at Rock Sound deemed Kerplunk! as the "most pure strain of Green Day that you're gonna find." Some reviews commented on the overall songwriting. NME writer Simon Williams saw Kerplunk as a "storming-but-soothing antidotal cream to smear on the current rash of grunge merchants." The staff at CMJ said that the hook in the tracks were "as easy to find as a broken string must be at a Green Day show. Keenly underscored by gleeful, chiming vocals and hurdle-jumping basslines, Green Day's tunes stick in your head like cat hair." Raub thought that Green Day were attempting to "prove something with Kerplunk", seeing it as a massive improvement over their earlier work, suggesting that the band had "matured a bit in their songwriting, even if they're still a bit immature." Myers said Armstrong appeared to be more confident songwriter; Conaton also praised Cool and Dirnt's contributions alongside Armstrong. Spitz highlighted "Christie Rd." and "Who Wrote Holden Caulfield?", while Robert Christgau in Christgau's Consumer Guide spotlighted "2000 Light Years Away" and "One for the Razorbacks". Randall Colburn said that while there was nothing groundbreaking on it, it had the promise of an act ready to "take over the world. Some bands need money to sound great; Green Day just needed money to be heard."

Other comments were made on the album's diverse aspects. Myers said Green Day retained the "nervous energy" from their debut album in plentiful amounts, and the material that had more musicality to it. Partridge noticed how "vibrant the band makes it all feel. Armstrong had already mastered the Taco Bell method of songwriting necessary for any great punk bandleader: He uses the same ingredients over and over to make stuff that has distinct flavors." Heller felt that the album formed "its own niche in the Green Day canon, not to mention '90s pop-punk. For a band that presented itself as being immature—probably because it was—there's a lot of maturity to the album." Dan Fidler of Spin remarked that their "downright pretty sound reminds you at times of early new wave, until the band slaps you in the face with furious choruses and fast-paced rhythms." Raggett said throughout the album, the band play with different "tempos, Green Day slow down tempos, try acoustic numbers, and in one hilarious moment, pull off a ridiculous yet worthy country pisstake with the Cool-written 'Dominated Love Slave'." Conaton also noticed the altering tempos, saying that they were "not a detriment, though, because it gives the album an organic, lived-in feel." He highlighted "One for the Razorbacks" and "Christie Rd." as prime examples of this, adding that while pop-punk was the band's forte, they "change it up just enough to keep their audience's attention."

== Commercial performance and accolades ==
Kerplunk sold 10,000 copies on its first day of release, becoming one of the biggest-selling releases for Lookout Records. Operation Ivy's debut Energy (1989) had been the label's biggest seller up to that point and took a year to shift 2,000 copies by comparison. At the end of 1992, another 20,000 copies had been sold, and in turn, increased sales of 39/Smooth. Gaar said the tours in support of the album aided its sales; the recording contract the band had with Lookout meant they took 60% of the profits on their releases. The following success of Dookie helped Lookout Records push sales of Kerplunk and the 1,039/Smoothed Out Slappy Hours (1991) compilation, with Kerplunk topping the Billboard Top Pop Catalog Albums chart and being certified platinum in the US. In the UK, it went gold in 2013. As of January 2017, the album has sold four million copies worldwide.

Publications have ranked the album towards the higher to middle ends of the band's discography: number three by IGN; number four by Consequence; number five by Louder and Stereogum; number six by Kerrang! and Paste. Rolling Stone included the album at number 29 on their list of the 50 best pop-punk albums, while Blender ranked the album number 47 on their list of the best 100 indie rock albums. Rock Sound placed Kerplunk at number 27 on a list of The Best 100 Pop-Punk Albums.

Songs off the album have appeared on best-of lists for Green Day tracks: Cleveland and PopMatters with "2000 Light Years Away". Consequence with "Christie Rd."; Kerrang! with "Who Wrote Holden Caulfield?". Chris Carrabba of Dashboard Confessional has expressed admiration for the album. The tribute album A Different Shade of Green: A Green Day Tribute, issued in 2003, included covers of "2000 Light Years Away" and "Christie Rd.". To coincide with the 31st anniversary of Kerplunk, bands from Argentina and Brazil covered the entire album under the title Green Day – A South American Tribute to 31 Years of Kerplunk (2022).

== Track listing ==
All lyrics by Billie Joe Armstrong, except "Dominated Love Slave" by Tré Cool and "My Generation" by Pete Townshend. All music by Green Day, except "2000 Light Years Away" by Green Day, Jesse Michaels, Pete Rypins and Dave E.C.

Side A
No.	Title	Length
1.	"2000 Light Years Away"	2:24
2.	"One for the Razorbacks"	2:30
3.	"Welcome to Paradise"	3:30
4.	"Christie Rd." ( (Note: The vinyl version of Kerplunk lists the song as "Christie Rd.", while the CD edition names it "Christie Road".))	3:31
5.	"Private Ale"	2:26
6.	"Dominated Love Slave"	1:41

Side B
No.	Title	Length
7.	"One of My Lies"	2:18
8.	"80"	3:39
9.	"Android"	3:00
10.	"No One Knows"	3:39
11.	"Who Wrote Holden Caulfield?"	2:42
12.	"Words I Might Have Ate"	2:30
Total length:		33:56

CD bonus tracks
No.	Title	Length
13.	"Sweet Children"	1:40
14.	"Best Thing in Town"	2:02
15.	"Strangeland"	2:08
16.	"My Generation" (The Who cover)	2:19
Total length:		42:06

== Personnel ==
Personnel is adapted from the album liner notes for the CD and vinyl versions, except where noted.

Green Day

- Billie Joe Armstrong – lead vocals, guitar; drums (track 6)
- Mike Dirnt – bass, backing vocals
- Tré Cool – drums; lead vocals, guitar (track 6)
- John Kiffmeyer (credited as Al Sobrante) – drums (tracks 13–16); executive producer

Production

- Andy Ernst – producer, engineer, mixing
- Green Day – producer
- John Golden – mastering

Artwork

- Chris Appelgren (credited as Applecore) – cover, disc
- Pat Hynes – other art
- Thadicus – art direction

== Charts and certifications ==
Chart performance for Kerplunk
Chart (1995)	Peak position
US Top Pop Catalog Albums (Billboard)	1

Certifications for Kerplunk
Region	Certification	Certified units/sales
United Kingdom (BPI)	Gold	100,000^{^}
United States (RIAA)	Platinum	1,000,000^{^}
^{^} Shipments figures based on certification alone.
