= And a Whole Lotta You! =

Studio album by Hi-Fives
- Released: 1997
- Genre: Alternative rock
- Length: 28:06
- Label: Lookout!
- Producer: Hi-Fives, Andy Ernst

Hi-Fives chronology
Welcome to My Mind (1994)	And a Whole Lotta You! (1997)	Get Down (1998)

And a Whole Lotta You! is the second studio album by American rock and roll band Hi-Fives. The album was released on 1997 by Lookout!.

== Track listing ==
1. "It's Up to You" – 1:51
2. "It Begins with You" – 1:32
3. "I'm Gonna Sit Right Down and Cry Over You" – 1:31
4. "Time Is Now" – 1:48
5. "No-No" – 1:20
6. "All I Want to Know" – 1:36
7. "Words Of Love" – 2:02
8. "Bad Connection" – 1:40
9. "I'll Take You There" – 1:49
10. "Say What You Want" – 1:31
11. "You Can" – 2:23
12. "Black and Blue" – 1:53
13. "A Whole Lotta You" – 1:45
14. "Peaquod" – 1:52
15. "Shhh!" – 1:46
16. "Tainted Love" – 1:36

== Personnel ==
- Chris Imlay – Guitar and Vocals
- John Denery - Guitar and vocals
- Jess Hilliard - Bass guitar
- Denny Seelig - Drums
