= Welcome to My Mind =

Studio album by Hi-Fives
- Released: 1995
- Genre: Alternative rock
- Label: Lookout!
- Producer: Hi-Fives, Andy Ernst

Hi-Fives chronology
Welcome to My Mind (1995)	And a Whole Lotta You! (1997)

Welcome to My Mind is the debut studio album by the American rock and roll band Hi-Fives. The album was released in 1995 by Lookout! It was nominated for a Bammy Award.

The band supported the album by opening several shows on Green Day's 1995 tour.

== Critical reception ==
Professional ratings
Review scores
Source	Rating
AllMusic	3/5 stars

The Lawrence Journal-World deemed the album "a combination of archaic Brit-pop and ground-breaking punk." In 2012, Spin called it a "near-perfect garage-punk-pop masterpiece."

== Track listing ==
1. "Welcome to My Mind"
2. "Transister Sister"
3. "Seven Years"
4. "Gone Gone Gone"
5. "How Narvell Felt"
6. "# "Moto"
7. "You'll Screw the Pooch"
8. "Love You Better"
9. "Go Feral In Just 3 Days"
10. "Angie"
11. "Humping Away"
12. "Let's Hear a Cheer"
13. "Beauty Is the Mind"
14. "Losing Sleep"
15. "Out of Control"
