= The Hi-Fives =

- Origin: Arcata, California, United States
- Genres: Indie rock, alternative rock, rock and roll
- Years active: 1994–2008
- Labels: Lookout! Records

The Hi-Fives are an American rock band from the San Francisco Bay Area.

== History ==
The band was formed in 1994 after drummer Al Sobrante (John Kiffmeyer) left the previous incarnations, The Ne'er Do Wells and Thee Shatners. Sobrante was replaced by drummer Julie Rose, formerly of Red No.9. Rose remained with the band through the recording of the first Lookout! Records album Welcome To My Mind. The title track was a minor hit on college radio and modern rock stations.

Rose left the band for personal reasons and was replaced by Evan Mendell from Benicia. The band was asked to open for Green Day during the 1994 Dookie tour, along with Pansy Division. Mendell left the band after the tour and was replaced by Danny Seelig from The Phantom Surfers.

The band won a category in the 1996 Bay Area Music Awards ("Bammies") for "Outstanding Alternative Pop/Rock Group" and embarked on a tour in the United States and Japan with the Mr. T Experience. While on U.S. tour with The Queers, Seelig and bassist Jess Hilliard both quit the band onstage after a fight. They returned to record the second album And A Whole Lotta You, but they were soon replaced with Steve Faine (previously of Decal and The Stimmies) and Gary Gutfeld (of Redemption 87).

The 1998 album Get Down followed. John Denery married Judy (from Judy and the Loadies), moved to Hawaii and back, while Chris Imlay became a graphic designer for such magazines as Gearhead, MacAddict, PlayStation: The Official Magazine, and Wired. The band played a couple of shows in 2005, and a show in January 2008 supporting the Mr. T Experience.

== Members ==
- Chris Imlay — guitar and vocals
- John Denery — guitar and vocals
- Jess Hilliard — bass guitar
- Julie Rose — drums
- Evan Mendell — drums
- Steve Faine — bass guitar
- Gary Gutfeld — drums

== Discography ==
=== Studio albums ===
- Welcome to My Mind (Lookout! Records, 1995)
- And a Whole Lotta You! (Lookout! Records, 1997)
- Get Down! (Lookout! Records, 1998)

=== Singles and EPs ===
- It's Up To You (Lookout! Records)
- Summer Games (Lookout! Records)
- Hypnotizer (G.I. Records)
- Misery (Go Zombie Records)
