= 1,039/Smoothed Out Slappy Hours =

Compilation album by Green Day
- Released: October 1, 1991
- Recorded: December 1988 – April 20, 1990
- Studios: Art of Ears Studios, San Francisco, California
- Genres: Punk rock; pop-punk; skate punk
- Length: 56:15
- Label: Lookout
- Producers: Andy Ernst; Green Day

Green Day chronology
Sweet Children (1990)	1,039/Smoothed Out Slappy Hours (1991)	Kerplunk (1991)

1,039/Smoothed Out Slappy Hours is a compilation album comprising early recordings by American punk band Green Day, released October 1, 1991, on Lookout Records. Often erroneously referred to as the band's debut album, the compilation combines the band's actual debut, 39/Smooth (1990), and its first two EPs, 1,000 Hours (1989) and Slappy (1990) (all currently out of print), as suggested by the amalgamation of the titles of the debut album and two EPs for the resulting compilation album. The album includes one cover, "Knowledge" (originally from the Slappy EP), which was originally by influential California punk band Operation Ivy, whose singer, Jesse Michaels, contributed the artwork for the album. The cover art features the same image from 39/Smooth.

Lookout re-released the album in 2004 with special limited packaging and all-new enhanced CD-ROM features, including live performances and pictures. The album was re-issued in the same packaging in 2007 through Reprise Records after Green Day pulled the album, along with the remainder of the band's catalog previously released through Lookout, from the label in August 2005 due to unpaid royalties.

1,039/Smoothed Out Slappy Hours has been certified Gold in the US by the RIAA; according to Nielsen SoundScan, it has sold 632,000 copies in the US as of August 2010. The album was certified Gold in the UK on July 22, 2013, representing sales of at least 100,000 copies. It has sold more than 2 million copies worldwide.

== Release ==
Initially released in 1991 through Lookout! Records (despite the 1990 copyright date on the album), the label re-issued the album in a remastered form in 2004. It was re-released on CD on January 9, 2007, by Reprise Records, the label Green Day has been signed to since leaving Lookout!. In Europe, the album was already re-released by Epitaph Europe, and has remained in print. It was reissued on vinyl on March 24, 2009, by Reprise in a package containing the original 10-song 39/Smooth LP along with reissues of the 1,000 Hours and Slappy EPs. On the 2009 reissues, the song "I Want to Be Alone" is omitted.

=== Composition ===
Musically, the record has been labeled as punk rock, pop-punk, and skate punk; “Disappearing Boy” for example featured as the backing track for the “Contests, Demos, Skate Parks” segment in Plan B’s Questionable (1992).

== Reception ==
Professional ratings
Review scores
Source	Rating
AllMusic	3/5 stars
Alternative Press	3/5 stars
Blender	2/5 stars
Encyclopedia of Popular Music	2/5 stars
Pitchfork	6.2/10
Punknews	3.5/5 stars
Robert Christgau	(dud)
The New Rolling Stone Album Guide	2.5/5 stars

Reviews of 1,039/Smoothed Out Slappy Hours were largely mixed; The New Rolling Stone Album Guide gave it 2.5 out of 5 stars, while Brad of Punknews.org gave it 3.5 out of 5 stars, writing, "All in all, this album succeeds at being quite good. It shows obvious influences from the Clash and the Ramones, and is a good debut for a young band that would later change the course of Punk Rock forever by opening the floodgates for New School bands."

== Track listing ==
All lyrics are written by Billie Joe Armstrong, except where noted; all music is composed by Green Day (Billie Joe Armstrong, Mike Dirnt, and John Kiffmeyer).

39/Smooth (1990)
No.	Title	Lyrics	Length
1.	"At the Library"		2:26
2.	"Don't Leave Me"		2:37
3.	"I Was There"	John Kiffmeyer	3:36
4.	"Disappearing Boy"		2:52
5.	"Green Day"		3:29
6.	"Going to Pasalacqua"		3:30
7.	"16"		3:24
8.	"Road to Acceptance"		3:35
9.	"Rest"		3:05
10.	"The Judge's Daughter"		2:34

All lyrics are written by Billie Joe Armstrong, except where noted; all music is composed by Green Day, except where noted.

Slappy EP (1990)
No.	Title	Lyrics	Music	Length
11.	"Paper Lanterns"			2:23
12.	"Why Do You Want Him?"			2:31
13.	"409 in Your Coffeemaker"			2:52
14.	"Knowledge" (Operation Ivy cover)	Jesse Michaels	Operation Ivy	2:19

All lyrics are written by Billie Joe Armstrong, except where noted; all music is composed by Green Day.

1,000 Hours EP (1989)
No.	Title	Lyrics	Length
15.	"1,000 Hours"		2:25
16.	"Dry Ice"		3:45
17.	"Only of You"		2:47
18.	"The One I Want"	Armstrong; Dirnt	3:01

No.	Title	Length
19.	"I Want to Be Alone" (from The Big One compilation by Flipside Records, omitted from 2009 reissues)	3:09
Total length:		56:15

Deluxe version (2004)
No.	Title	Length
20.	"Paper Lanterns" (Live from WMMR, Minneapolis, MN, 4/18/91)	1:36
21.	"Words I Might Have Ate" (Live from WMMR, Minneapolis, MN, 4/18/91)	1:46
22.	"Studio Banter" (Live from WMMR, Minneapolis, MN, 4/18/91)	2:56
23.	"One for the Razorbacks" (Live from WMMR, Minneapolis, MN, 4/18/91)	1:25

== Personnel ==
Green Day

- Billie Joe Armstrong – lead vocals, guitar
- Mike Dirnt – bass guitar, backing vocals
- John Kiffmeyer – drums

Additional performers

- Aaron Cometbus – backing vocals on Slappy EP tracks, "teeth" on "Knowledge"

Production

- Andy Ernst – producer, engineer
- Green Day – producers
- John Golden – mastering
- Susie Grant – front cover photo
- Jesse Michaels – artwork
- Pat Hynes – artwork, graphic design, layout design
- Chris Appelgren; Aaron Cometbus; Rich Gargano; David Hayes – artwork
- Murray Bowles; Arica Pelino – photography
- Ted Jensen – remastering
- John Yates – packaging

== Charts ==
Chart (1995)	Peak position
Australian Albums (ARIA)	176

== Certification ==
Region	Certification	Certified units/sales
United States (RIAA)	Gold	500,000^{^}
^{^} Shipments figures based on certification alone.
