= Chris Imlay =

American musician and graphic artist

Christopher Sterling Imlay (born May 24, 1969) is an American rock and roll musician and graphic artist.

He has been in such bands as The Hi-Fives, The Dukes of Burl, The Dukes of Hamburg, Brent's T.V., Judy and The Loadies, Thee Shatners, and the Ne'er Do Wells.

He has been the art director of the magazines Gearhead, MacAddict, Mobile PC, PSM, Nintendo Power was a senior designer at Wired a creative director at Future US and currently is a design director at Dialect Inc.
