= Goodnight Lights =

American indie rock band

- Origin: Collingswood, New Jersey, United States
- Genres: Indie Rock; Alternative Rock
- Years active: 2009–present
- Labels: Independent
- Members: Michael Schraeger; Faith Charlton; Ian Charlton; Jonah Delso; Michael Ziegler
- Website: goodnight-lights.com/fr_home.cfm/

Goodnight Lights is an indie-rock band from Collingswood, New Jersey formed in 2007. Their name references Margaret Wise Brown's Goodnight Moon. The band's sound incorporates elements of post 1990's indie rock, including the "lo-fi" alternative rock movement led by bands such as Pavement and Guided by Voices. Called "Fractured-pop specialists" by the Philadelphia Inquirer in January 2010, Goodnight Lights are known for high-energy live performances. The band has independently released three self-produced albums and performs frequently among mid-level Philadelphia rock venues.

== History ==
The five members first came together in the summer of 2007. Members include brother and sister Ian and Faith Charlton, Michael Ziegler (from Toledo-based bands The Young Lords and Buick 6), Michael Schraeger (from Collingswood-based bands Futureman and Reverie), and Jonah Delso (also a solo singer/songwriter).

Goodnight Lights' first album was recorded live to tape at Drexel University's recording studios, engineered by recording student Michael Smedes and released independently in 2009.

The band returned to the studio with Smedes to record their follow-up album "Electric Spark", released in 2010. The sophomore album earned Goodnight Lights notable press including a nomination by The Deli Magazine for Philadelphia's emerging artist of the year. Director Bruce Warren of AAA radio station WXPN called "Electric Spark" "...a terrific collection of songs that sits in the post-’90s alternative rock continuum with a high degree of originality—due in large part to the well crafted songwriting and vibrant playing".

Goodnight Lights third album As Far As The Moon released in 2012 was self-recorded and produced in the band's Collingswood practice space, along with other makeshift studio locations. On June 17, 2012, Matthew Berlyant of NYC rock magazine The Big Takeover named the album in his top 10 picks, alongside artists such as Radiohead and Guided By Voices.

Goodnight Lights continues to perform and receive airplay in the Philadelphia area.

== Members ==
=== Current members ===
- Michael Schraeger - Guitar, Vocals
- Faith Charlton - Keys, Vocals, Percussion
- Ian Charlton - Guitar, Vocals
- Jonah Delso - Bass, Vocals
- Michael Ziegler - Drums, Percussion

== Discography ==
=== Albums ===
Year	Title	Label
2009	Goodnight Lights (self-titled)	Independent
2010	Electric Spark	Independent
2012	As Far As The Moon	Independent
2015	Say What You Want	Independent
