= Shenanigans (album) =

Compilation album by Green Day
- Released: July 2, 2002
- Recorded: 1993–2002
- Genres: Punk rock; skate punk; hardcore punk
- Length: 33:23
- Label: Reprise
- Producers: Rob Cavallo; Green Day

Green Day chronology
International Superhits! (2001)	Shenanigans (2002)	American Idiot (2004)

Singles from Shenanigans
- 1. "Ha Ha You're Dead" Released: 2002

Professional ratings
Aggregate scores
Source	Rating
Metacritic	61/100
Review scores
Source	Rating
AllMusic	4/5 stars
Alternative Press	7/10
Blender	2/5 stars
Encyclopedia of Popular Music	3/5 stars
NME	7/10
Rolling Stone	2/5 stars
The Rolling Stone Album Guide	3/5 stars

Shenanigans is the second compilation album by American rock band Green Day. It was released on July 2, 2002, by Reprise Records. The album contains B-sides, rarities, covers, and the previously unreleased track "Ha Ha You're Dead". "Espionage", a spy-themed instrumental, was featured on the soundtrack for Austin Powers: The Spy Who Shagged Me and "Tired of Waiting for You", their cover of the Kinks song of the same name, was featured on the soundtrack for the 1997 film Private Parts.

Shenanigans peaked at number 27 on the US Billboard 200 upon its release and has sold 280,000 units as of September 2010. Even though the original cover does not feature a title, several retailers fixed confusion over it by designing a sticker which was plastered on the front. In a September 2009 interview by Fuse on Demand, when asked who designed the cover for the group's eighth studio album, 21st Century Breakdown (2009), Billie Joe Armstrong said that Chris Bilheimer designed it as well as the last four album covers.

The album was supposed to include a track titled "D.U.I." (written and sung by Tré Cool), but was removed. It was only available on unmastered copies of the album.

== Musical style and composition ==
Shenanigans been described musically as a mix of punk rock, skate punk, and hardcore punk.

== Track listing ==
All lyrics are written by Billie Joe Armstrong, except where noted; all music is composed by Green Day, except where noted.

No.	Title	Original appearance	Length
1.	"Suffocate"	"Good Riddance" and Australian editions of Nimrod (1997)	2:54
2.	"Desensitized"	"Good Riddance" and Japanese and Australian editions of Nimrod (1997)	2:47
3.	"You Lied"	"Good Riddance" and Australian editions of Nimrod (1997)	2:26
4.	"Outsider" (written by Dee Dee Ramone; originally performed by the Ramones)	"Warning" (2000)	2:17
5.	"Don't Wanna Fall in Love"	"Geek Stink Breath" (1995)	1:38
6.	"Espionage" (instrumental)	"Hitchin' a Ride" (1997) and the Austin Powers: The Spy Who Shagged Me soundtrack (1999)	3:23
7.	"I Want to Be on T.V." (written by Sam McBride, Tom Flynn; originally performed by Fang)	"Geek Stink Breath" and Japanese editions of Insomniac (1995)	1:17
8.	"Scumbag" (lyrics written by Mike Dirnt)	"Warning" (2000) and the American Pie 2 soundtrack (2001)	1:46
9.	"Tired of Waiting for You" (written by Ray Davies; originally performed by The Kinks)	"Basket Case" (1994) and the Private Parts soundtrack (1997)	2:34
10.	"Sick of Me"	"Hitchin' a Ride" (1997)	2:07
11.	"Rotting"	"Good Riddance" (1997)	2:52
12.	"Do Da Da"	"Brain Stew / Jaded" (1996) and Australian editions of Nimrod (1997)	1:30
13.	"On the Wagon"	"Basket Case" (1994)	2:48
14.	"Ha Ha You're Dead" (lyrics written by Mike Dirnt)	Previously unreleased	3:07
Total length:			33:23

== Personnel ==
Green Day

- Billie Joe Armstrong – lead vocals, guitar
- Mike Dirnt – bass guitar, backing vocals, baseball bats on "Desensitized" and co-lead vocals on "Outsider" and "Ha Ha You're Dead"
- Tré Cool – drums, percussion, lead vocals on "D.U.I." (promotional unmastered copies only)

Production

- Rob Cavallo – producer
- Green Day – producers
- Jerry Finn – mixing on "You Lied", "Don't Wanna Fall in Love", "I Want to Be on T.V.", "Tired of Waiting for You", "Rotting", "Do Da Da", "On the Wagon"
- Kevin Army – engineer on "You Lied", "Don't Wanna Fall in Love", "I Want to Be on T.V.", "Rotting", "Do Da Da"
- Neill King – engineering on "Tired of Waiting for You", "On the Wagon", mixing on "Sick of Me"
- Ken Allardyce – engineering on "Suffocate", "Desentitized", "Espionage", "Sick of Me"
- Chris Dugan – engineering on "Ha Ha You're Dead"
- Casey McKrankin – additional engineering on "Tired of Waiting for You" and "On the Wagon"
- Willie Samuels – engineering on "Outsider", "Scumbag", "Ha Ha You're Dead"
- Chris Lord-Alge – mixing on "Suffocate", "Desentitized", "Espionage", "Sick of Me"
- Steve Hall – mastering on "Suffocate", "Desentitized", "Espionage", "Sick of Me"
- Bob Ludwig – mastering on "You Lied", "Don't Wanna Fall in Love", "I Want to Be on T.V.", "Rotting", "Do Da Da"
- Robert Vosgein – mastering on "Outsider", "Scumbag", "Ha Ha You're Dead"

Artwork

- Chris Bilheimer – cover art

== Charts ==
=== Weekly charts ===
Weekly chart performance for Shenanigans
Chart (2002)	Peak position
Australian Albums (ARIA)	110
Austrian Albums (Ö3 Austria)	33
German Albums (Offizielle Top 100)	100
Irish Albums (IRMA)	27
Italian Albums (Musica e Dischi)	30
UK Albums (Official Charts)	32
US Billboard 200	27
Uruguayan International Albums (CUDISCO)	2

=== Year-end charts ===
2002 year-end chart performance for Shenanigans
Chart (2002)	Position
Canadian Alternative Albums (Nielsen SoundScan)	175

== Certifications and sales ==
Certifications and sales for Shenanigans
Region	Certification	Certified units/sales
Japan (RIAJ)	Gold	100,000^{^}
South Korea	—	5,610
United Kingdom (BPI)	Gold	100,000^{^}
^{^} Shipments figures based on certification alone.
