= 39/Smooth =

1990 studio album by Green Day

Studio album by Green Day
- Released: April 13, 1990
- Recorded: December 29, 1989 – January 2, 1990
- Studios: Art of Ears, San Francisco, California
- Genres: Punk rock; pop-punk; skate punk
- Length: 31:12
- Label: Lookout
- Producers: Green Day; Andy Ernst

Green Day chronology
1,000 Hours (1989)	39/Smooth (1990)	Slappy (1990)

39/Smooth is the debut studio album by the American rock band Green Day, released on April 13, 1990, by Lookout Records. After finalizing their line-up, the band played frequent shows at the 924 Gilman Street venue, where they started attracting a following and eventually caught the attention of Lookout Records' founder Larry Livermore. Following the release of their debut EP 1,000 Hours (1989) and stints in other bands, Green Day went to Art of Ears Studio, located in San Francisco, California, to record their debut studio album, which was co-produced with Andy Ernst. Sessions started at late December 1989 and ended in January 1990, costing $675. 39/Smooth has been tagged as punk rock, pop-punk and skate punk, with comparisons made to the work of older punk bands the Buzzcocks and the Ramones, as well to contemporaries Crimpshrine and the Lookouts. Written mostly by frontman and guitarist Billie Joe Armstrong, unrequited love and longing for desire served as the main lyrical topics, while reminiscing on youth appeared in two of the songs. It is the band's only album to feature drummer John Kiffmeyer.

39/Smooth was met with acclaim within Green Day's contemporary community; retrospective reviews praised the songwriting and individual musicianship of each of the band members, while some critics were more negative of the album. In the lead-up to the album's release, Armstrong dropped out of high school, and the members took up odd jobs while Kiffmeyer and bassist Mike Dirnt continued their education. To promote 39/Smooth, the band embarked on a 45-date tour of the United States, which began in June 1990. By its end, Kiffmeyer enrolled in college without notifying the other members, with Armstrong learning of it through a friend.

The album, plus related EPs from the time, were included on the 1,039/Smoothed Out Slappy Hours (1991) compilation album, which is often erroneously referred to as the band's debut. By 1994, 39/Smooth had sold 75,000 copies, and in the following year, peaked at number five on the US Billboard Top Pop Catalog Albums chart. Publications have ranked the album towards the lower end of the band's discography, such as number 10 by Kerrang! and Paste and number 11 by Spin.

== Background and recording ==
Following a shared interest in music, and the creation of original material, guitarists Billie Joe Armstrong and Mike Dirnt formed a band. After going through another name, they stuck with Sweet Children; Armstrong and Dirnt worked security at punk club 924 Gilman Street in Berkeley, California. John Kiffmeyer, also known as "Al Sobrante", drummer of Gilman performers Isocracy, was invited to play with them. He helped refine Sweet Children's sound, and taught them a work ethic of recording music as cheaply and quickly as possible. Sweet Children played their first Gilman show in November 1988, where they accumulated a fan base; after the departure of bassist Sean Hughes, Dirnt moved to bass. During a house party, Sweet Children were brought to the attention of Larry Livermore, who operated Lookout Records, which was originally planned to only release material from Livermore's band the Lookouts.

Livermore subsequently signed Sweet Children following a show with the Lookouts. The record deal made the members of Sweet Children realize that they needed a new name, ultimately choosing Green Day. (Note: Marc Spitz, author of Nobody Likes You – Inside the Turbulent Life, Times and Music of Green Day (2006), wrote that the Green Day name was taken from an Armstrong-written track of the same name. Myers, who also mentioned the track, said the name originated from a comment spoken by Sesame Street character Ernie. It subsequently became an inside joke between the members, who used it to refer to their joint smoking sessions, with Kiffmeyer even having the words displayed on the back of his jacket. In Green Day – Rebels with a Cause (2006), author Gillian G. Gaar said it was "variously attributed" to both Ernie and as a slang term for smoking pot. According to Livermore, this was done to avoid confusion with another local band, Sweet Baby.) They played their last show under the old moniker on April 1, 1989, at Gilman for a benefit show. That same month, the 1,000 Hours EP was released through on seven-inch vinyl. Livermore commented that due to the poppy nature of the release that it would be difficult to sell to record buyers, taking around six months for the EP to start attracting attention from the public. Author Ben Myers wrote in Green Day: American Idiots & The New Punk Explosion (2006) that while it did not have a unique musical direction amongst the band's peers, the EP helped to place Green Day as well as Berkeley "on the map". They performed for the first time since the name change supporting Operation Ivy on May 28, 1989, at Gilman. During this time, Armstrong and Dirnt played in other bands, such as Blatz, Corrupted Morals and Crummy Musicians.

Green Day recorded their debut album at Art of Ears Studio in San Francisco, California, around Christmas 1989 when recording time was inexpensive. Andy Ernst, who previously worked on the 1,000 Hours EP, co-produced the sessions with members of the band. Sessions started on December 29, 1989; Armstrong and Dirnt tracked their vocals at the same time in order to save on both money and time. Myers noted that the members' influences, such as the Buzzcocks, the Clash and the Ramones, "all of whom recorded quickly, and it clearly showed as they applied the same sense of pared-down economy to their own blistering debut." The majority of the album was finished the following day, preceded by guitar parts and vocal harmonies. The album was mixed and completed by January 2, 1990. The sessions cost $675 (equivalent to $1,800 in 2025), charged to Livermore. John Golden mastered the recordings at K Disc Mastering in Hollywood, California. Prior to the album coming out, Livermore wanted to issue another single to build hype. Subsequently, the band went back to Art of Ears and recorded four songs in a few hours, which became the Slappy (1990) EP.

== Composition ==
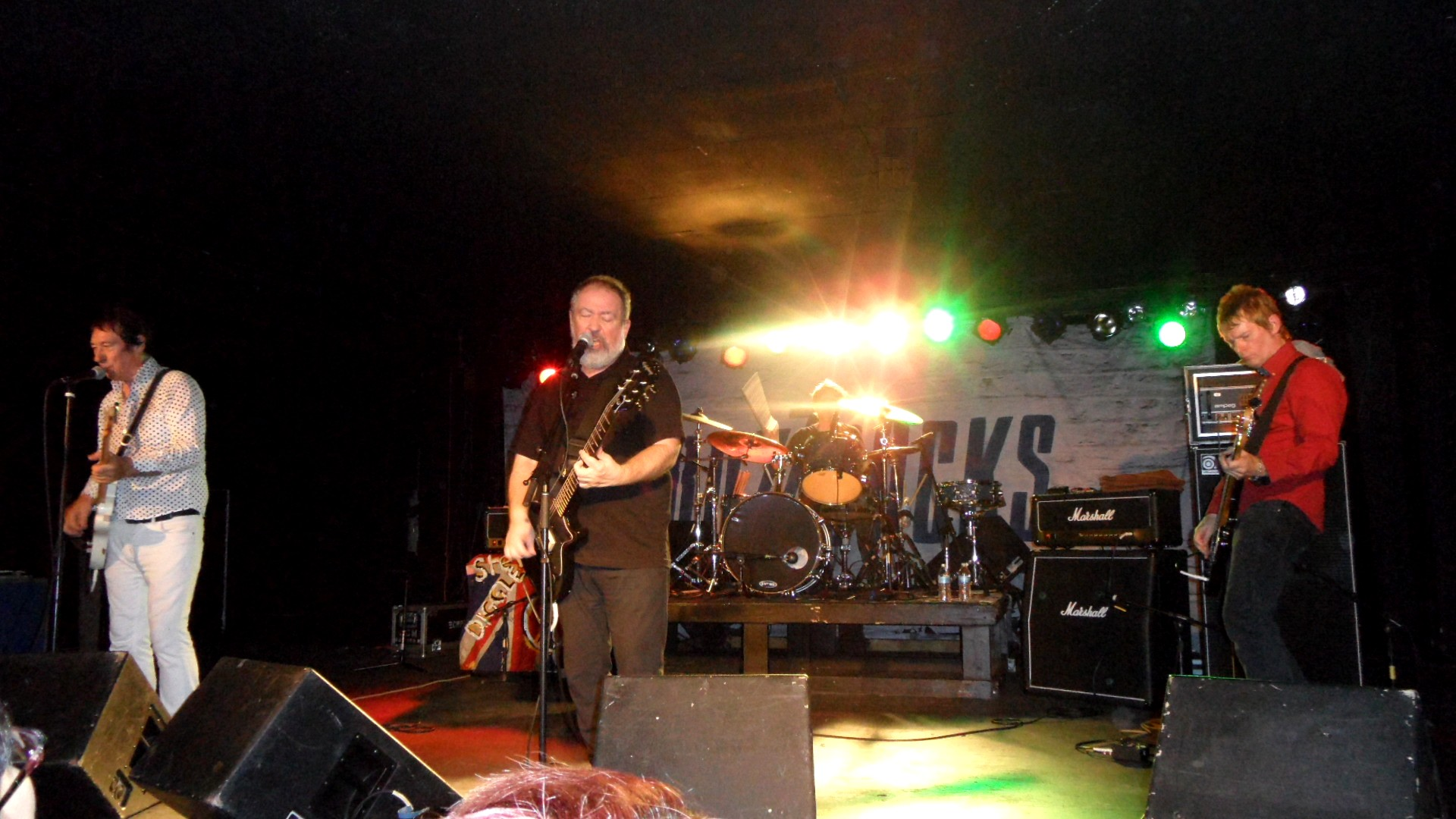
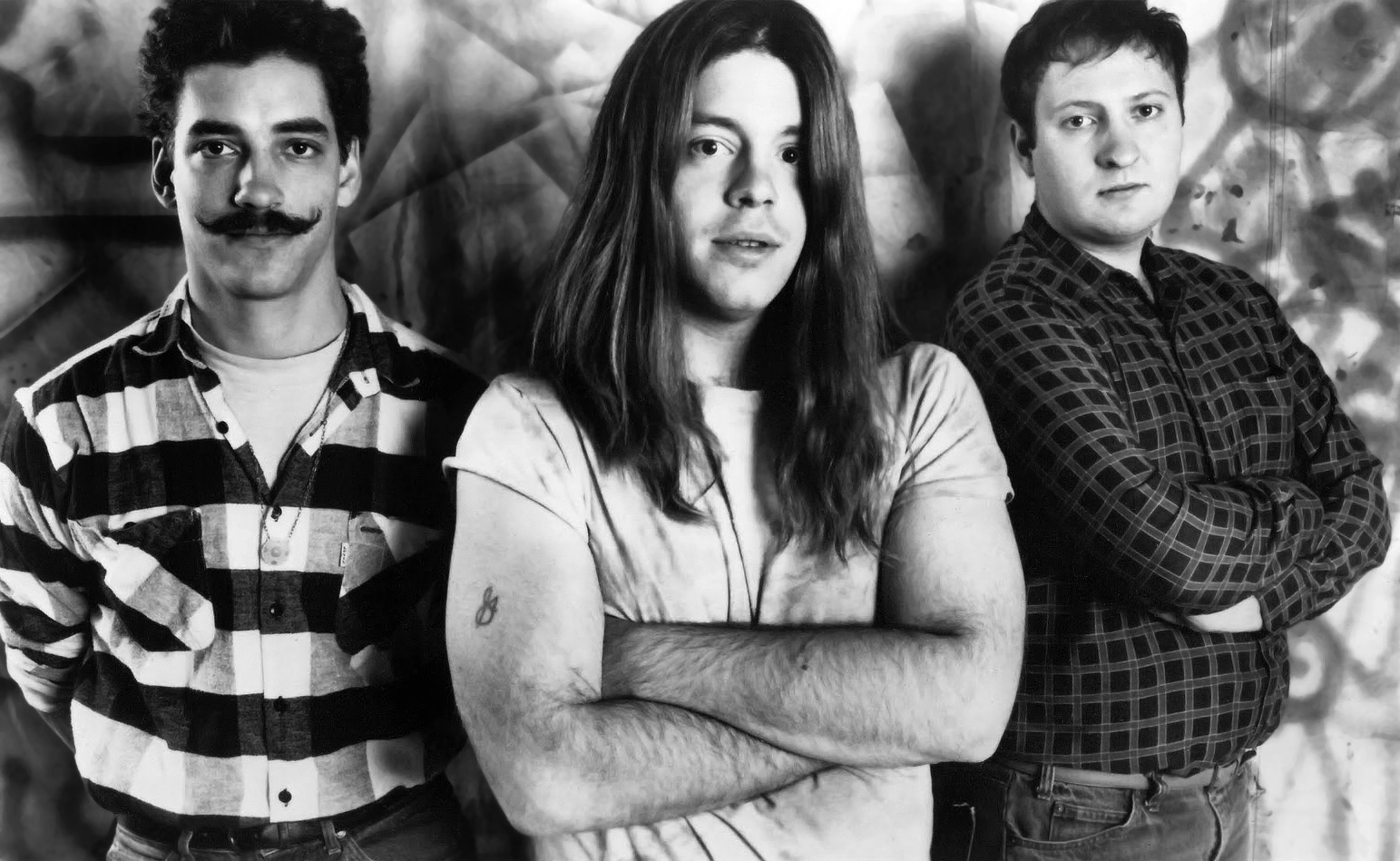
Biographer Ben Myers drew comparisons between 39/Smooth and the sound of Buzzcocks (top) and Hüsker Dü (bottom).

The main lyrical theme of 39/Smooth revolves around unrequited love and longing for desire, which appeared in "At the Library with Waba Sé Wasca", "Disappearing Boy" and "The Judge's Daughter". While "I Was There" and "16" are about reminiscing on youth, which Gaar suggested that these were interesting declarations from the band as the members themselves were still young. Musically, 39/Smooth has been tagged as punk rock, pop-punk, skate punk, and power pop. Myers said the songs merged the band members' overt adoration of pop hooks by British acts from the 1960s, topped by the "regionalized intonation of British punk's strongest voices." He also highlighted the sound of the Buzzcocks and Hüsker Dü as points of comparison, while Stereogum's Jay Papandreas drew comparison to labelmates Crimpshrine and the Lookouts, and Eduardo Rivadavia, writing for Discogs, said its three-chord tracks were indebted to the work of the Ramones. NME critic Simon Williams noted the band's "frothy Fraggle-laced guitar and primitive – but passionate – harmonies" and called it a prime example of American underground music.

With album opener "At the Library with Waba Sé Wasca", Allyson Johnson of The Young Folks said the band presented the Southern Californian sound that managed to "both fit them in the scene while allowing them to stand out ..." She added that it displayed the formula for which they would continue to use throughout their career: "The gritty and buzzsaw sounding guitars only make for a more immediate, satisfying star." Armstrong said "Don't Leave Me" was about an occasion in the seventh grade where a girl had broken up with him. "I Was There" has lyrics written by Kiffmeyer; Gaar said it was a broad retrospective view of "one's past — torn between wanting it to last, but ultimately choosing to look ahead toward tomorrow." Jack Holly of The Young Folks said Armstrong can be heard recounting locations him and his bandmates had visited and individuals they have encountered in their brief run as a band. (Note: Spitz compared the introspective nature of "I Was There" to that of "In My Life" (1965) by the Beatles, which Green Day leaned into for later songs in their career, such as "Good Riddance (Time of Your Life)" (1997), "Waiting" (2001) and "Wake Me Up When September Ends" (2004) to help them stand out from their contemporaries.) "Green Day", which starts with the sound of a bong hit, discusses being inebriated while dreaming about a girl and staring directing at the ceiling. On "Going to Pasalacqua", Holly wrote that Armstrong was adamant about trying to get the attention of girl that he would visit a funeral home, Pasalacqua, located in Benicia, California, to achieve this. Johnson spotlighted "16" as a highlight, touching on the song's sense of heightened youthfulness, and noted that it was more restrained compared to the rest of the tracks. "Road to Acceptance", which was influenced by racism, talks about a person who lambasts their own reputation as an outsider. Preceded by the slower song "Rest", "The Judge's Daughter" concluded 39/Smooth; Armstrong said it was about a girl from Pinole Valley High School.

== Release ==
=== Promotion and packaging ===
In February 1990, Armstrong dropped out of high school shortly prior to the release of their debut album, in order to focus exclusively on Green Day. Around this time, as Dirnt and Kiffmeyer focused on working and education, a tour for the band spanning 45 dates across the US was scheduled. (Note: Myers said the 1990 US tour was booked by Armstrong, while Spitz said it was done by Kiffmeyer, and Gaar simply said it was self-booked.) To raise money for the trek, the members took up odd jobs. Lookout Records released 39/Smooth on April 13, 1990, issued on the vinyl and cassette formats. It was released around the time of albums by the likes of their contemporaries Bad Religion, NOFX, the Offspring and Pennywise, all of whom were frequently playing shows, though were ignored by major publications and record labels. Attitudes towards alternative music were slowly shifting, as Myers remarked, "but not that quickly. Green Day and the punks' true time was yet to come, and for now they existed in a vacuum unaffected by traditional rock 'n' roll conceits. ... [39/Smooth] was released and life carried on." As Lookout Records did not have enough funds for promotion, word of mouth about 39/Smooth spread from the small amount of reviews it earned in zines.

When the members of Green Day were wrapping up the production of the album, the word "smooth" was in frequent rotation, and they wanted to use it in the title. It was during this time that Alen, Armstrong's oldest sibling, had turned 39, which they jokingly wanted to use it in the name as well as they were unsure if they would get the chance to make another album. The album was eventually titled 39/Smooth. The cover of 39/Smooth, which was designed by Jesse Michaels of Operation Ivy, depicts a black-and-white image of a woman in a cemetery. Michael Roffman of Consequence of Sound said the cover was "a little eerie" which he attributed to the shining tree branches seen in the image. Out of all of the band's albums, Myers remarked that its monochrome and somber nature made it stand out as the "least Green Day-looking" cover. Aaron Cometbus, editor of the Cometbus zine, created some additional artwork for the sleeve; Myers said his "recognizable cartoony pen-and-ink style came to define the band's early works and nicely complemented the content within." The back of the sleeve featured three photographs, shot by Murray Bowles, of Green Day performing at Gilman. Accompanying the images were cartoon illustrations, done by Michaels, which included keys, safety pins, a matchbox and faces of monsters. A martini glass can also be seen, which Gaar said was a comment on the no-alcohol policy enforced at Gilman. The lyric sheet included in the sleeve included an alleged letter from major label I.R.S. Records, who claimed to have an interest in the band, saying they were best act from the Bay Area since the emergence of the Dead Kennedys. In addition to this was two response letters, one from Kiffmeyer and other from Livermore; Gaar said the I.R.S. letter was forged as the result of Kiffmeyer having located some stationery belonging to the label from a trash receptacle. Around two years after the album's release, Livermore received threatening letters from I.R.S. for the incident, and apologized to them.

=== US tour and related events ===
To assist the release of 39/Smooth, Green Day appeared at several Gilman gigs, some that served as benefit shows for Lookout or fanzines in the area, namely Cometbus. One show also included a May 1990 performance at Pinole Valley High School, who were hosting local acts for Foreign Food Day. The day after Dirnt graduated from that high school, the band embarked on the aforementioned 45-date US tour. They used a van that was bought from Armstrong's brother, and was refurbished as to have more space to sleep and store their equipment. They were accompanied by Hughes, who served as their roadie. (Note: Cometbus also joined Green Day for the US trek as their roadie, documenting the journey in an issue of Cometbus. Gaar said there was a map of the country, with markers denoting eventful instances of the tour, such as when Armstrong was stung by poison ivy and required medical attention or when Dirnt had broken his instrument in half thanks to a split guitar strap.) It started on June 19, 1990, on the West Coast, going up to Canada, before returning to the US, from where they journeyed to the East Coast, travelling to Florida, moving to the Midwest and ending in California. (Note: While playing a gig in Minnesota, Armstrong bonded with attendee Adrienne Nesser. She would later move to California and marry Armstrong. Alongside this, Green Day were invited to record songs for Skene! Records, who were based in Saint Paul, Minnesota. They recorded at a local studio in the area; in lieu of newer tracks, the band opted to tackle Sweet Children-era material. Dirnt explained that they preferred to be recording and as they were "still playing those songs ... it was like, 'Hey, we've got studio time — let's record 'em!'" As the songs were released as the Sweet Children (1990) EP, fans mistakenly thought it was the band's first release, which Livermore attributed to the poor sound quality.)

They played in a variety of punk clubs, house parties and bars, with crowd sizes varying from 50 people to 500. Venues that scheduled the band received contracts from them with two requests – that nourishment and accommodation was prioritized over money, and did ask for a minimum of $100 if there was enough to spare, though stipulated this was not a requirement. The band stated on the contracts the places "do not have to give us any of these things, of course we don't have to tune before we play either." Funds that Green Day made from the performances ended up going to paying for food and buying gas. To aid their income, they bought inexpensive shirts from local business, which were then printed with their band logo and promptly put on sale at the gigs. They also gave a discount to attendees to bring their own shirts to the shows for printing.

Though the tour was seen as a success by the band, Kiffmeyer did not want to go through the hassle of such an endeavor again and instead enrolled in Humboldt State College in Arcata, California later in the year. He did not outright tell them that he was departing. Armstrong was surprised by this as he only found out through Cometbus. Afterwards, Armstrong was unsure if he wanted to continue the band. Dave EC of Filth and the Wynona Riders joined Green Day, though left after a few weeks. Armstrong remembered Tré Cool and learned that he was free. Cool had been playing with the Lookouts since he was 12. At age 16, Cool was a regular of the Gilman scene, going to parties and playing with various acts. Through this, he became familiar with Armstrong and Dirnt. Cool ultimately joined Green Day in late 1990.

The later CD release of 39/Smooth featured tracks from the two prior EPs, in addition to I Want to Be Alone, which was previously released on a Flipside magazine various artist compilation in 1990. This version was retitled 1,039/Smoothed Out Slappy Hours, which omitted the letters from Kiffmeyer, Livermore and I.R.S., and included the 1,000 Hours and Slappy EPs. In late 2005, citing a royalty dispute, the band took control of their Lookout Records-era releases, including 1,039/Smoothed Out Slappy Hours, second studio album Kerplunk (1991), and the 1,000 Hours and Slappy EPs. "Going to Pasalacqua" was pressed on a seven-inch vinyl record, with "Road to Acceptance" and "Disappearing Boy" as the B-sides, as part of the Ultimate Collectors 7" Vinyl Singles Box Set (2009) collection. In the lead up to the Green Day: Rock Band (2010) video game, Cool said that while the master tapes for 39/Smooth still exist, the process to digitize them would destroy the tape given their age.

== Reception ==
Professional ratings
Review scores
Source	Rating
AllMusic	3/5 stars
Encyclopedia of Popular Music	3/5 stars
NME	7/10

39/Smooth was met with acclaim within the local community and on a national level due to Lookout Records' outreach. Some critics praised the songwriting found on 39/Smooth. Spitz and Gaar said the writing had positively evolved from 1,000 Hours, with the former praising the lyrics, and the latter impressed with the progression in such a short time frame. Myers said the band were able to mould a sonic direction "bubbling with energy, melodies and lyrical themes that struck a chord." Al Shipley of Spin saw the album as a "revealing listen", as it "sounds shockingly close to the skate punk sound which with the band would conquer the world four years later." Louder writer Alistair Lawrence wrote that the album had the "hint of something special, ... 39/Smooth takes the raw ingredients that make Green Day unique and starts them simmering."

A few reviews focused on the individual aspects of the band members. Robbins and Neugebauer complimented Armstrong for his "well-mannered lyrics - hopeful, uncertain, self-conscious", which "manage only mild psychic discomfort ... and romantic tension rather than any rebellious insurgence." Raggett said his vocal "balance of disaffection and nervous, goofy passion is well in place, while he's already showing his effective, no-frills approach to chewy feedback melody. Reed Strength of Paste said Armstrong's voice was the album's biggest weakness, referring to it as "ear-grating, brow-furrowing singing." Raggett remarked that Dirnt was "no slouch himself, providing good backing vocals when needed for harmony ..." Robbins and Neugebauer said Dirnt and Kiffmeyer push "the songs along, and Billie Joe sings them earnestly, without the contrived English accent he would later affect. A very tentative start." Raggett highlighted Kiffmeyer for the "most prominent performance throughout" the album, while Shipley thought he was not "quite a force of nature like Tre Cool, but he has similar instincts on how to keep the tempos brisk and the drum fills splashy."

Others were more negative of 39/Smooth, with some only highlighting a single track. AllMusic reviewer Ned Raggett said it "isn't a truly great album in the first place. It's not bad, by any means ... It's just little more than a fun punk-pop album with some entertaining metallic flash here and there," akin to a multitude of albums created in the late 1980s and early 1990s. Finn White for IGN found it to be lackluster, lamenting that the tracks were dissimilar from one another, though clarified that as it shows the band at their "least refined, ... therein lies its charm and primary appeal." For Kerrang!, writer Ian Winwood said upon hearing the album in the present day, it comes across as a "collection rich in promise but lacking in real-time impact." Ira Robbins and Delvin Neugebauer of Trouser Press said the album was a "relatively tame power-pop affair. Although plucky and brash, the music is too timid to even flirt with punk intensity levels." Papandreas said that the album was evidently the creation of a "924 Gilman band" that was not "anything to write home about. ... The record itself is middling, disposable pop-punk until you get to 'Going To Pasalacqua,' which gives the best glimpse of what Green Day had to come." Winwood, reviewing for BBC Music, also highlighted "Going to Pasalacqua", Marc Hogan of PopMatters singled out "I Was There" as a songwriting achievement.

Prior to the release of Green Day's major label debut, Dookie (1994), 39/Smooth had sold 75,000 copies. Lookout Records' operations director Chris Appelgren said the joint efforts of 39/Smooth and Kerplunk boosted sales of other albums in the label's catalog. In 1995, 39/Smooth peaked at number five on the US Billboard Top Pop Catalog Albums chart; Kerplunk appeared in the same listing, topping the chart. Publications have ranked the album towards the lower end of the band's discography: number six by IGN and Stereogum; number seven by Louder; number 10 by Kerrang! and Paste; and number 11 by Spin. The tribute album A Different Shade of Green: A Green Day Tribute, issued in 2003, included covers of "Going to Pasalacqua" and "Rest". Jaret Reddick of Bowling for Soup, and Brett Gurewitz of Bad Religion, expressed admiration for the album, with the latter saying that whenever bands came to his studio, they also hyped up the release.

== Track listing ==
All lyrics are written by Billie Joe Armstrong, except "I Was There" by John Kiffmeyer; all music is composed by Green Day.

Side A
No.	Title	Length
1.	"At the Library with Waba Sé Wasca" ( (Note: Shortened to just "At the Library" on 1,039/Smoothed Out Slappy Hours.))	2:28
2.	"Don't Leave Me"	2:39
3.	"I Was There"	3:36
4.	"Disappearing Boy"	2:52
5.	"Green Day"	3:29

Side B
No.	Title	Length
6.	"Going to Pasalacqua"	3:30
7.	"16"	3:24
8.	"Road to Acceptance"	3:35
9.	"Rest"	3:05
10.	"The Judge's Daughter"	2:34
Total length:		31:12

== Personnel ==
Personnel per sleeve.

Green Day

- Billie Joe Armstrong – lead vocals, guitar
- Mike Dirnt – bass, backing vocals
- John Kiffmeyer – drums

Production

- Green Day – producer
- Andy Ernst – engineer, producer
- John Golden – mastering

Artwork

- Susie Grant – front cover photo
- Murray Bowles – back cover photos
- Jesse Michaels – design, art

== Charts ==
Chart performance for 39/Smooth
Chart (1995)	Peak position
US Top Pop Catalog Albums (Billboard)	5

== See also ==
- Making Things with Light – the 1990 album by labelmates and contemporaries the Mr. T Experience
- Unfun – the 1990 debut album by contemporaries Jawbreaker, who had broken up after their own extensive US tour
