= 1,000 Hours =

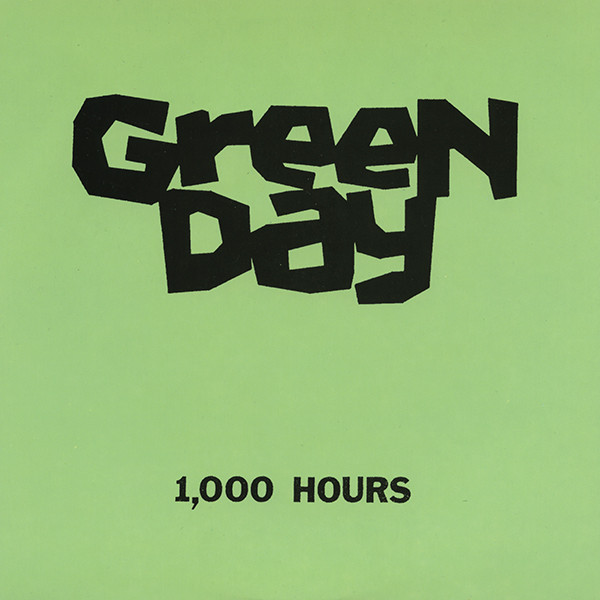

EP by Green Day
- Released: April 1989
- Recorded: Early 1989
- Studios: Art of Ears, San Francisco, California
- Genres: Punk rock; power pop
- Length: 11:52
- Label: Lookout
- Producers: Andy Ernst; Green Day

Green Day chronology
1,000 Hours (1989)	39/Smooth (1990)

1,000 Hours is the debut extended play (EP) by American rock band Green Day, released in April 1989 through Lookout Records. Through a shared interest in music, school friends Billie Joe Armstrong and Mike Dirnt formed the band Sweet Children. With the addition of drummer John Kiffmeyer, they played at the local punk club 924 Gilman Street in Berkeley, California, where they started attracting a following. After playing a show with the Lookouts, one of their members, Larry Livermore, signed Sweet Children to his label Lookout Records. They co-produced their debut EP, 1,000 Hours, with Andy Ernst at the Art of Ears Studio in San Francisco, California, in early 1989.

Critics praised the production quality of the 1,000 Hours EP. Before its release, Sweet Children changed their name to Green Day, which Livermore said would make it difficult to shift copies of the EP. They played their last show as Sweet Children in April 1989, and played their first show as Green Day in May 1989, supporting Operation Ivy at Gilman. They subsequently played a show in July 1989 with Necromancy, before the members participated in other bands. 1,000 Hours was later included in the 1,039/Smoothed Out Slappy Hours (1991) compilation alongside their other early releases.

== Background ==
Billie Joe Armstrong and Mike Dirnt became school friends in 1983. After a shared interest in music, and learning that Armstrong played guitar, Dirnt himself got a guitar. With Armstrong taking to writing his own material, the pair started a band. Sean Hughes played with them on bass; he joined for fun, while Armstrong was serious about creating music. Though they had other members, Raj Punjabi was the most frequent drummer in the line-up. They went through several names before sticking with Sweet Children. (Note: They named themselves Sweet Children after an Armstrong-written track of the same name, and, as Myers wrote, in part as a "sarcastic pre-emptive strike to would-be critics thinking of patronizing the three fifteen-year-olds." The song later appeared on the 1990 EP of the same name.) Armstrong and Dirnt worked security at punk club 924 Gilman Street in Berkeley, California, a position they used to analyse the various punk bands that performed there. Despite having jobs at the venue, they were unable to play there as Sweet Children as owner Tim Yohannan did not think the band sounded punk enough.

Around this time, Dirnt moved in with Armstrong's family, allowing the pair to spend further time on the band. One day, they invited John Kiffmeyer, drummer of Gilman performers Isocracy, to jam with them. Kiffmeyer helped refine their sound, and give them a work ethic of recording music as cheaply and quickly as possible, in homage to the acts that influenced them, such the Buzzcocks and Ramones. Further inspiration was drawn from bands that performed at Gilman, where Armstrong mostly saw shows. Sweet Children played their first show at Gilman in November 1988, supporting Neurosis. They started gaining a following at Gilman in addition to playing house parties. During this time, Hughes left and Dirnt moved to the bass role. The latter latched on to the instrument quicker than he did guitar, practicing it at school during break periods and lunchtime.

== Signing and recording ==
During one house party, Sweet Children were brought to the attention of Larry Livermore, who operated the local zine Lookout. Lookout Records spun off from the publication, though originally planned to only release material from Livermore's band the Lookouts. (Note: The Lookouts' drummer was Tré Cool, who had been playing with them since he was 12. At age 16, Cool was a regular of the Gilman scene, going to parties and playing with various acts. Through this, he became familiar with Armstrong and Dirnt. When Kiffmeyer left Green Day to focus on college, Cool joined the band in late 1990.) Sometime later, he signed Sweet Children after they played a show with the Lookouts. Livermore was confident before they ended the first track of their set that he wanted to make an album with them.

Livermore acknowledged that they were poppier than their contemporaries acts from Gilman: "But I thought the songs and the performances were so good that they deserved to be captured on vinyl ..." Sweet Children recorded their debut EP, 1,000 Hours, at the Art of Ears Studio in San Francisco, California, in early 1989. Andy Ernst co-produced the proceedings with the band; he worked with fellow Lookout act Corrupted Morals prior to the session. Reportedly recorded in seven hours, the songs were done live with a few overdubs added afterwards.

== Composition and lyrics ==
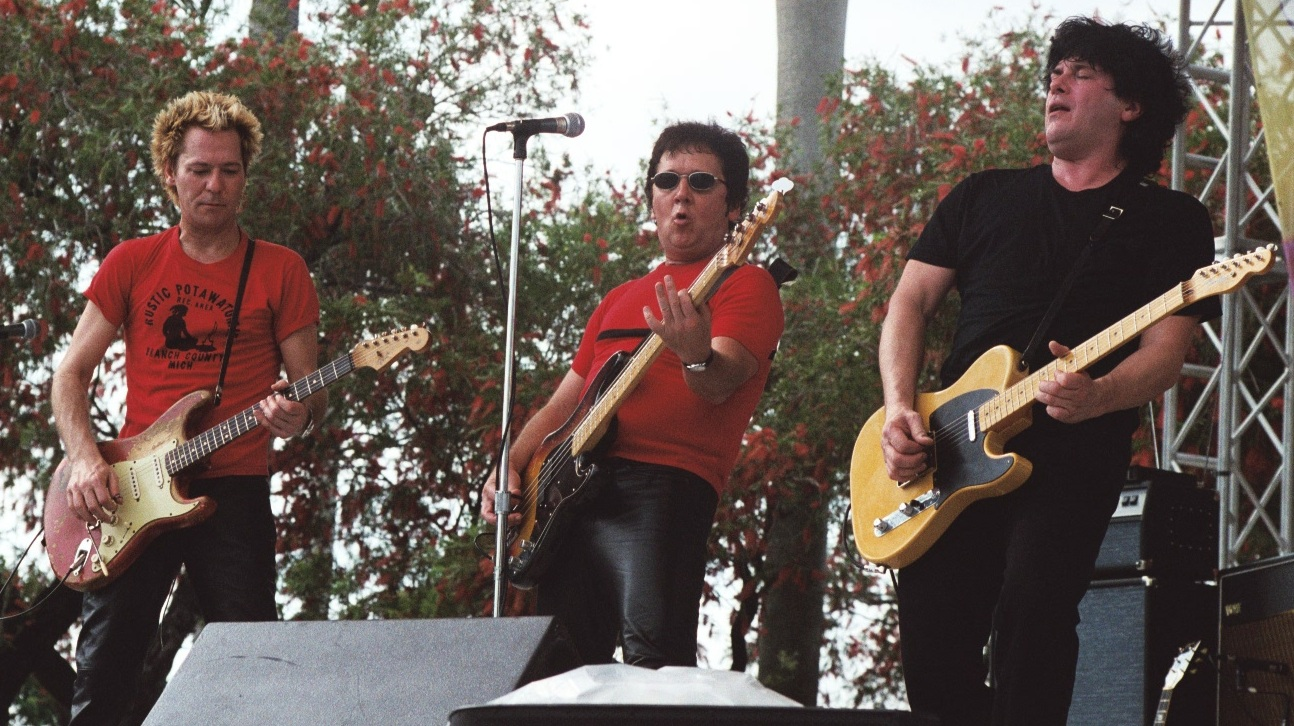
Gaar said listeners, who might be unaware of the style of Sweet Children, could infer influences from the Romantics.

The sound of 1,000 Hours was described as up-tempo power pop by Gaar, and blending the "rebellious tendencies of punk-rock with sweet and tender pop music" by Sam Evans of Sonoma State. Elements of heavy metal and a polished sound for an underground punk album was noted by Ned Raggett of AllMusic. Gaar suggested that if a listener knew nothing about Sweet Children beforehand, they could infer influences from British Invasion bands or 1980s power pop in the style of the Romantics. The songs, as he writes, are sung near "breathlessly, as if Billie Joe wants to hurry through the numbers before losing his nerve in confessing his love ..." The only thematic elements of the EP revolved around love and girls; Gaar proposed that "'thwarted love' would be a more accurate description", citing that "1,000 Hours", "Dry Ice" and "The One I Want" has the narrator lamenting the distance between themselves and the person they desire.

Myers said the title track, "1,000 Hours" was a forceful, "fuzzed-up pop song with infectious harmonies, lyrically unsophisticated perhaps, but then so is most pop music about girls". Armstrong was dismissive of the track: "Not only was it not for a band to play or to play as a band, it's just the sappiest song about a girl, to the point where it's like a bad John Hughes movie!" Myers felt that "Dry Ice" would not be amiss on the band's later releases, such as on their third studio album Dookie (1994) or their sixth studio album Warning (2000). He found "Only of You" and "The One I Want" to be "big surprise listen[s]", comparing them to popstar Tiffany. He explained that the latter's 1988 track "I Think We're Alone Now" shared the similar lyrical topics of "teen confusion, alienation and lost love, and the same sense of melody, as Billie Joe's first release[d] song[s]."

== Release and reception ==
The record deal with Lookout Records made Sweet Children realise that they needed a new name, settling on Green Day. (Note: Marc Spitz, author of Nobody Likes You – Inside the Turbulent Life, Times and Music of Green Day (2006), wrote that the Green Day name was taken from an Armstrong-written track of the same name, which was ultimately featured on their debut studio album, 39/Smooth (1990). Myers, who also mentioned the track, said the name originated from a comment spoken by Sesame Street character Ernie. It subsequently became an inside joke between the members, who used it to refer to their joint smoking sessions, with Kiffmeyer even having the words displayed on the back of his jacket. Gaar said it was "variously attributed" to both Ernie and as a slang term for smoking pot.) Livermore theorized that one reason for altering their name was that there was a band with the similar-sounding name of Sweet Baby, something that Gaar also noted. As Lookout were preparing to release the upcoming EP, he was furious: "I was like, 'Everybody knows you as Sweet Children. How am I supposed to sell a record by a band called Green Day?'" Sweet Children played their last show under this old moniker on April 1, 1989 at Gilman for a benefit show alongside Samiam and Stikky. (Note: Myers suggested that this show, which also had Squeable Squabble and Square Meal on the line-up, caused Sweet Children to perceive that their name was highly similar to other acts that performed at Gilman, "a little too dumb.")

1,000 Hours EP released in April 1989 through Lookout Records on seven-inch vinyl. The artwork had the band's name and the EP's title in black ink against a green sleeve, which was swapped for pink when Livermore used up all the green paper when xeroxing the covers. The back of the EP sleeve, taken by Murray Bowles, had a picture of the band; additional roles were listed for each member, such as Armstrong with "hat", Dirnt with "hair" and Kiffmeyer with "bus". Gaar suggested that the extra credits alluded to back cover, which had Armstrong wearing a baseball cap on backwards and Dirnt hanging off a railing upside as his hair reaches the floor below. The second pressing of the EP included a lyric sheet, offering credits for the songs.

Dirnt said the members of Green Day went into Lookout's office when the EP arrived from the pressing planet to help staff fold the sleeve for each record. Livermore commented that due to the poppy nature of the release that it would be difficult to sell to Lookout Records-inclined record buyers. It subsequent took around six months for the EP to start attracting attention from the public. According to Myers, the 1,000 Hours EP became a consistent-selling release for Lookout Records. He mentioned that while it did not have a unique musical direction amongst their peers, the EP helped to place Green Day as well as Berkeley "on the map". Green Day performed for the first time since the name change supporting Operation Ivy on May 28, 1989, at Gilman. They then supported Necromancy for a show in Davis, California, 50 miles away from where they were located. Around this time, Armstrong and Dirnt were preoccupied with appearing in other bands: Blatz and Corrupted Morals for the former, and Crummy Musicians for the latter.

Professional ratings
Review scores
Source	Rating
AllMusic	3/5 stars

Critics latched on to the production of EP. Raggett focused on "how polished, even downright professional, everything sounds ... clearly recorded and instantly engaging." Akin to their other early work, Raggett found the four tracks to be "engaging rather than flat-out fantastic". Spitz was also impressed with "how ready the band sounds"; Myers, similarly, commented that what he heard to be alarming was "not the relatively cheap-sounding production ... but the ability of three school kids who have been lucky enough – or talented, or a bit of both – to find their own unique voice early on."

The 1,000 Hours EP was included in its entirety alongside 39/Smooth and the Slappy (1990) EP as part of the 1,039/Smoothed Out Slappy Hours (1991) compilation. In late 2005, citing a royalty dispute, the band took control of their Lookout Records-era releases, including 1,039/Smoothed Out Slappy Hours, second studio album Kerplunk, and the 1,000 Hours and Slappy (1990) EPs.

== Track listing ==
All lyrics written by Billie Joe Armstrong unless otherwise noted; all music written by Green Day.

Side A
No.	Title	Writer(s)	Length
1.	"1,000 Hours"		2:24
2.	"Dry Ice"	Armstrong, Mike Dirnt	3:43

Side B
No.	Title	Length
1.	"Only of You"	2:44
2.	"The One I Want"	2:59
Total length:		11:50

== Personnel ==
Band personnel per insert with the seven-inch vinyl record, and Gaar.

Green Day

- Billie Joe Armstrong — lead vocals, guitar
- Mike Dirnt — bass, backing vocals
- John Kiffmeyer — drums

Production and artwork

- Andy Ernst — producer
- Green Day — producer
- Murray Bowles — photography
