= John Kiffmeyer =

American musician and drummer

- Also known as: Al Sobrante
- Born: July 11, 1969 (age 57); El Sobrante, California, U.S.
- Genres: Punk rock; pop punk; alternative rock
- Occupations: Musician; cinematographer; songwriter
- Instrument: Drums
- Years active: 1986–1995, 2015 (musician); 1995–present (cinematographer)
- Label: Lookout!
- Formerly of: Isocracy; Green Day; The Ne'er Do Wells

John Kiffmeyer (born July 11, 1969), also known professionally as Al Sobrante, is an American cinematographer and retired musician and songwriter. He is the former drummer for the punk rock band Green Day; he left the band in 1990 and was replaced by Tré Cool. His stage name is a reference to his hometown, El Sobrante.

== Biography ==
John Kiffmeyer was born in El Sobrante, California on July 11, 1969. His first exposure in the punk scene was as the drummer of the band Isocracy. The group was popular in the East Bay, and mainstays at the club 924 Gilman Street.

Kiffmeyer is most well known for his time in Green Day; after Isocracy broke up, he joined Mike Dirnt and Billie Joe Armstrong in 1988 to replace original drummer Raj Punjabi and join Sweet Children, which was later renamed Green Day. Because of his experience and knowledge of the underground community, Kiffmeyer was able to get the young band on its feet by placing calls to friends, among them prominent figure of the East Bay Larry Livermore. The first few performances took place at Contra Costa College, where Kiffmeyer was a journalism student. On the strength of an early performance, Livermore vowed to release a Green Day record on his Lookout! Records. The group's first full-length effort, 1990 album 39/Smooth, would feature a Kiffmeyer original, "I Was There", which documented the band at that place in time. Being a fan of Ozzy Osbourne, he inspired the mini-covers of some famous songs, such as "I Don't Know" by Osbourne and "Sweet Home Alabama" by Lynyrd Skynyrd during the bridge of "Disappearing Boy", a practice that is still carried out today.

In 1990, he attended college at California State Polytechnic University, Humboldt in Arcata, California. While Kiffmeyer was attending college, Green Day members Billie Joe Armstrong and Mike Dirnt accepted drummer Tré Cool into the band, which Kiffmeyer "graciously accepted". In 1991, he worked as executive producer for the Green Day album Kerplunk, released that year. Kiffmeyer later joined the band The Ne'er Do Wells, leaving abruptly in 1994. Following a stint with punk band The Ritalins, he became manager of The Shruggs until their split. In 1998 he was the executive producer of The Great Lost Trouble Makers Album by The Troublemakers, a garage rock band from Sacramento, California.

He now lives in San Francisco, California, and is married to experimental filmmaker and San Francisco State University professor Greta Snider. He works as a Director of Photography, specializing in green screen and producing mainly commercial work.

On April 16, 2015, Kiffmeyer joined Billie Joe Armstrong and Mike Dirnt on stage during a Green Day concert at The House of Blues in Cleveland, Ohio, where the trio performed as Sweet Children and played songs that they had not performed since the 1990s, including "Sweet Children", "Green Day", "I Was There", "Don't Leave Me" and "Dry Ice".

== Discography ==
=== With Isocracy ===
- El Sob Demo (1987)
- Bedtime For Isocracy (1988)

=== With Green Day ===
==== Studio albums ====
- 39/Smooth (1990)

==== Other releases ====
- 1,000 Hours (EP, 1989)
- Slappy (EP, 1990)
- Sweet Children (EP, 1990)
- 1,039/Smoothed Out Slappy Hours (1991)

=== With The Ne'er Do Wells ===
- Hello, It Is I, Thee Intolerable Bastard, Child Genius (1993)

=== Other appearances ===
- Turn It Around! (1987 compilation album) ("Confederate Flags")
- The Big One (1991 compilation album) ("I Want To Be Alone")

=== Production discography ===
- Green Day – Kerplunk (1991) as Executive Producer
- The Trouble Makers – The Great Lost Trouble Makers Album (1998)
