= Knowledge (song) =

1989 song by Operation Ivy

Song by Operation Ivy

from the album Energy
- Released: March 1989
- Genre: Punk rock
- Length: 1:42
- Label: Lookout!
- Songwriter: Operation Ivy
- Producers: Kevin Army; Operation Ivy; Larry Livermore

"Knowledge" is a song by American band Operation Ivy. It was written by lead vocalist Jesse Michaels and appeared on the album Energy.

During the opening of the song at Operation Ivy's last show at Gilman St. (which was released on the Lint Rides Again bootleg), Michaels opens the song by saying, "this song is called 'Knowledge', and it's about growing up."

The song was notably covered by alternative rock band Green Day on their E.P. Slappy.

== Personnel ==
- Tim Armstrong – guitars, background vocals
- Jesse Michaels – lyrics, lead vocals
- Dave Mello – drums, background vocals
- Matt McCall – bass, background vocals
