= Sweet Children (EP) =

EP by Green Day
- Released: August 1990
- Recorded: July 5, 1990
- Studio: 6ft Under
- Genre: Punk rock
- Length: 8:12
- Label: Skene!
- Producer: Green Day

Green Day chronology
Slappy (1990)	Sweet Children (1990)	1,039/Smoothed Out Slappy Hours (1991)

Professional ratings
Review scores
Source	Rating
AllMusic	2.5/5 stars

Sweet Children is the third EP by American rock band Green Day. It was released in August 1990 through Skene! Records. The name of the EP is a reference to a previous name of the band. One of the tracks is a cover of "My Generation" by the Who. All tracks were later included on the CD and cassette releases of the band's second studio album, Kerplunk.

== History ==
The EP is a collection of some of the band's earliest songs that they were still playing live at the time. It was recorded in two hours on July 5, 1990, at Six Feet Under in Minneapolis while the band was on a brief break from their summer tour, and released on seven-inch vinyl. The EP was released on Minneapolis-based indie label Skene! Records. "Best Thing in Town" was one of the first songs the band had written together. These were the last recordings drummer John Kiffmeyer would contribute to the band. Shortly after the end of the tour, he left the band to attend college.

Also of note, "My Generation" features a line from the film Blue Velvet: "Heineken? Fuck that shit!", said by the primary antagonist Frank Booth, although it's not the actual audio sample.

== Pressings ==
There are five different pressings of the EP (some limited quantities included two different variations of red vinyl). The first four have been out of print since its inclusion on the CD and cassette issues of Green Day's second studio album, Kerplunk, in 1992. Because of this, it has since become a valuable and sought-after item among collectors and Green Day fans alike.

The first pressing's cover is a picture of Mike Dirnt's leg during a concert.

The second pressing's cover is a black and white picture of a somewhat trashed Volkswagen Beetle with the caption "What Do You Think Mike..." This rare second pressing, limited to 600 copies as opposed to the first run's 1,500, also featured a handwritten insert, reading "Not a lyrics sheet, so don't get your hopes up".

The third pressing is the same as the one above in every way except there is no insert, and the cover, instead of being black and white, is tinted red.

The fourth pressing is a reissue, possibly from 1991, for it has a lengthy summary on the back which explains that the songs are also on Kerplunk. The cover is mostly blank, featuring only a picture of a group of three children nearby a body of water with their backs to the camera, although at the bottom of the cover it says “(Note: No! This is not a new Green Day 7” but the same old SKENE! one that we keep having to repress and hence keep running out of covers for…the music is exactly the same, just in different packaging to keep the people who have to stuff these things into plastic sleeves from getting bored. So keep in mind, catering to collector-scum by paying big $$$ for something because it looks a wee bit different only makes you look like a sap…)”

On March 24, 2009, the EP was back in print as it was included with the vinyl reissue of Kerplunk. It is a reissue of the first pressing.

In 1990, on the first day of the EP's release, it sold 493 copies.

== Track listing ==
All lyrics are written by Billie Joe Armstrong, except where noted; all music is composed by Green Day, except where noted.

Side A
No.	Title	Lyrics	Length
1.	"Sweet Children"		1:41
2.	"Best Thing in Town"	Armstrong; Mike Dirnt	2:04

Side B
No.	Title	Writer(s)	Length
1.	"Strangeland"		2:08
2.	"My Generation"	Pete Townshend; originally performed by the Who	2:19
Total length:			8:12

== Personnel ==
- Billie Joe Armstrong – lead vocals, guitar
- Mike Dirnt – bass, backing vocals
- John Kiffmeyer – drums, backing vocals
