= Slappy =

EP by Green Day
- Released: 1990
- Recorded: April 20, 1990
- Studio: Art of Ears (San Francisco)
- Genre: Punk rock
- Length: 10:07
- Label: Lookout!
- Producer: Andy Ernst; Green Day

Green Day chronology
39/Smooth (1990)	Slappy (1990)	Sweet Children (1990)

Professional ratings
Review scores
Source	Rating
AllMusic	3/5 stars

Slappy is the second EP by American rock band Green Day. It was released in 1990 through Lookout! Records. Upon its release, several different colors of vinyl were available in limited quantities. Frontman and guitarist Billie Joe Armstrong cited the extended play as the one on which Green Day began to find its sound. The dog on the cover was known as Mickey. "Slappy" was a nickname given to him by bassist Mike Dirnt's friend Jason Relva (the subject of Green Day's later song J.A.R.). The EP includes one cover, "Knowledge", which was originally by influential California punk band Operation Ivy. All four tracks were later included on the compilation album 1,039/Smoothed Out Slappy Hours in 1991.

== Liner notes ==
Recorded in a few hours on April 20, 1990, at Art of Ears Studio with Andro Engineering and mixed April 23 in a few more hours. Produced by Andro and Green Day. Mastered by John Golden at K-Disc, Hollywood. Front cover photo by Al Sobrante, back Sean Hughes Layout and "Green Day Bitz" by Aaron Cometbus. Green Day's 39/Smooth L.P. and 1,000 Hours E.P. were also available on Lookout.

== Album information ==
"Paper Lanterns" was a popular Green Day song and a live staple for many years and was brought back for the 2010 leg of the 21st Century Breakdown World Tour. "Why Do You Want Him?" was the first song Armstrong wrote, back when he was fourteen. He expressed in a 2010 interview that contrary to the common belief, the song is not about his stepfather. The title "409 in Your Coffeemaker" is taken from a prank Armstrong pulled on his teacher. The prank was that he put some Clorox cleaner in his teacher’s coffeemaker, and it was known as Formula 409, hence the name of the song. It was later re-recorded during the Dookie (1994) sessions, and was released as a B-side on the "Basket Case" CD single in the United Kingdom. "Knowledge" was originally performed by Operation Ivy for their 1989 album Energy. Green Day still performs the song live, often inviting fans onstage to play the band members' instruments for them during the performance of the song.

All four tracks from Slappy were included on the compilation album 1,039/Smoothed Out Slappy Hours in 1991. Slappy remained in print until August 2005, when Green Day removed its catalog from Lookout! Records.

Since March 24, 2009, Slappy (along with 1,000 Hours) has been back in print as a bonus to the vinyl reissue of the 39/Smooth (1990) album. However, a possible error may have been made as Slappy's artwork is now tinted pink instead of dark red.

== Track listing ==
All lyrics are written by Billie Joe Armstrong except where noted; all music is composed by Green Day, except where noted.

Side one
No.	Title	Length
1.	"Paper Lanterns"	2:23
2.	"Why Do You Want Him?"	2:31

Side two
No.	Title	Length
1.	"409 in Your Coffeemaker"	2:54
2.	"Knowledge" (lyrics written by Jesse Michaels; music composed by Operation Ivy; originally performed by Operation Ivy)	2:19
Total length:		10:07

== Personnel ==
- Billie Joe Armstrong – lead vocals, guitar
- Mike Dirnt – bass, backing vocals
- John Kiffmeyer – drums
- Aaron Cometbus – backing vocals, "teeth" on "Knowledge"
