= 99 Revolutions Tour =

2013 concert tour by Green Day

- Tour by Green Day
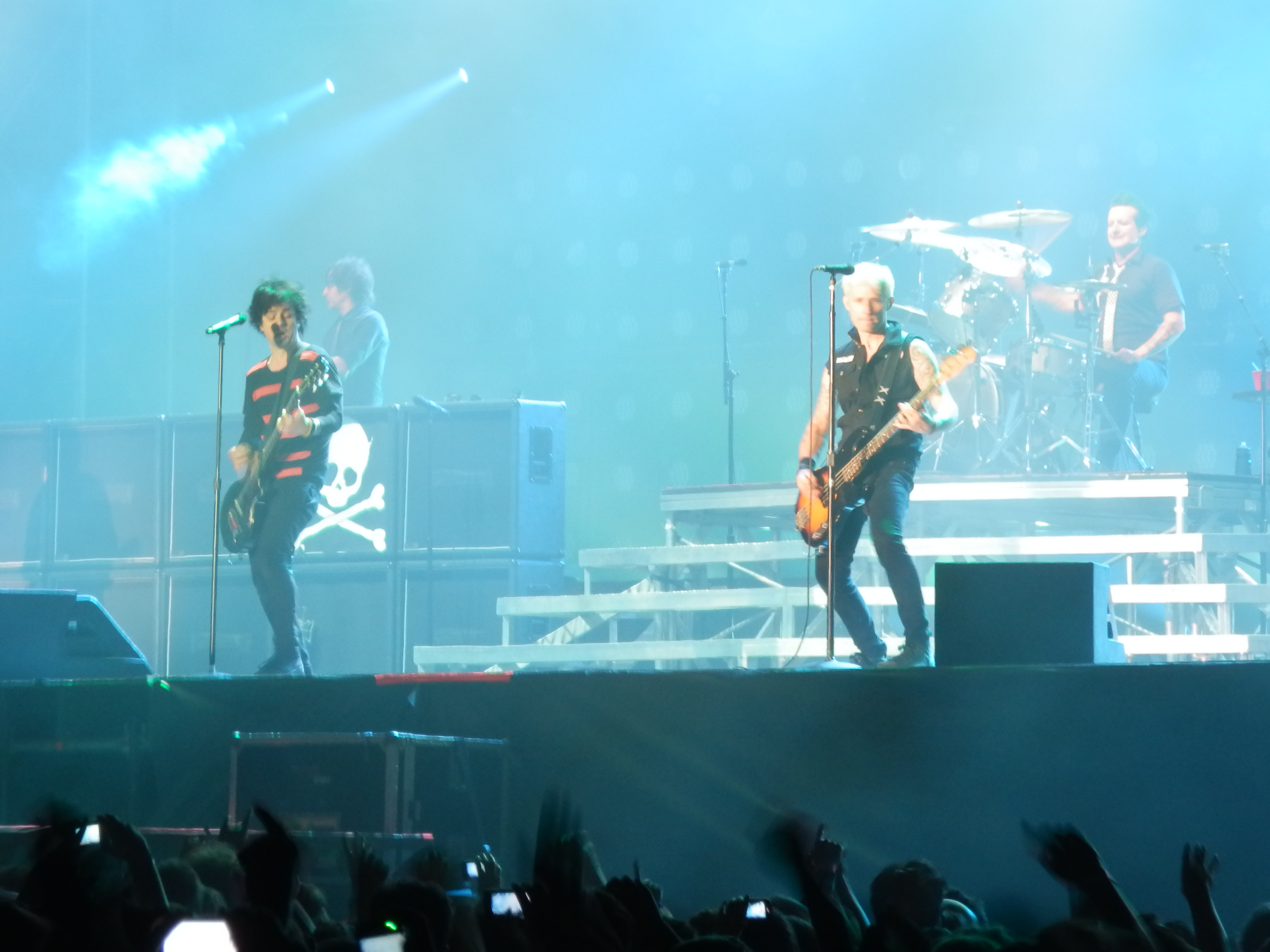
- Green Day performing in Rome, June 5, 2013
- Location: Europe; North America
- Associated albums: ¡Uno!; ¡Dos!; ¡Tré!
- Start date: March 10, 2013
- End date: August 24, 2013
- Legs: 2
- No. of shows: 45

Green Day concert chronology
- 21st Century Breakdown World Tour (2009–10); 99 Revolutions Tour (2013); Revolution Radio Tour (2016–17)

99 Revolutions Tour was a concert tour by American rock band Green Day in support of the band's trilogy, ¡Uno!, ¡Dos! and ¡Tré!, that took place in 2013. The tour was named after the song "99 Revolutions" from ¡Tré!.

Before the announcement of the trilogy, the band had been playing "secret shows", revealing previously unheard songs. The first of these shows was on August 11 at the Tiki Bar in Costa Mesa, California. After the announcement of the trilogy, the band began performing promotional shows leading up to the tour which kicked off on March 10, 2013, at Pomona, California's Pomona Fox Theater. In 2014 following the 99 Revolutions Tour, Green Day headlined the Soundwave Festival Tour 2014 in Australia.

The tour was the first time Green Day had ever performed their 1994 album Dookie in its entirety. This was done for five shows towards the end of the tour to celebrate the album's 20th anniversary. This tour is also notable for having the band's first major live shows since its release not to end the show with a performance of "Good Riddance (Time of Your Life)." Green Day instead opted to close with "Brutal Love", the opening rock ballad track that is also featured on ¡Tré!.

== Opening acts ==
- All Time Low (Europe) (select dates)
- Kaiser Chiefs (London, Oslo)
- Stickup Kid (US) (SXSW)
- Best Coast (US, Canada)
- Hladno Pivo, Superhiks, Atheist Rap (Serbia)
- The Baseballs (Austria)
- Twin Atlantic (Montreux)
- Classic Hugo and the Dirty Dick Beaters (El Paso, Trieste, and Locarno only)
- Billy Talent (Tallinn)
- Volbeat (Nîmes)
- Black Rebel Motorcycle Club (Nîmes)
- The Stitches (Pomona and Tempe)
- Frank Turner (London)
- The Bastard Sons of Dioniso (Milan)

== Setlist ==
1. "99 Revolutions"
2. "Know Your Enemy"
3. "Stay the Night"
4. "Stop When the Red Lights Flash"
5. "Letterbomb"
6. "Oh Love"
7. "Holiday"
8. "Boulevard of Broken Dreams"
9. "Stray Heart"
10. "Burnout"
11. "When I Come Around"
12. "Waiting"
13. "Hitchin' a Ride"
14. "Going to Pasalacqua"
15. "Brain Stew"
16. "Welcome to Paradise"
17. "Longview"
18. "St. Jimmy"
19. "Basket Case"
20. "She"
21. "King for a Day"
22. "X-Kid"
23. "Minority"

Encore

24. "American Idiot"
25. "Jesus of Suburbia"
26. "Brutal Love"

== Tour dates ==
List of 2013 concerts
| Date | City | Country | Venue |
|---|---|---|---|
| March 10, 2013 | Pomona | United States | Pomona Fox Theater |
| March 11, 2013 | Tempe | United States | Marquee Theatre |
| March 13, 2013 | El Paso | United States | Tricky Falls |
| March 15, 2013 | Austin | United States | Moody Theater |
| March 28, 2013 | Rosemont | United States | Allstate Arena |
| March 29, 2013 | Moline | United States | iWireless Center |
| March 31, 2013 | Pittsburgh | United States | Consol Energy Center |
| April 1, 2013 | Rochester | United States | Blue Cross Arena |
| April 3, 2013 | Philadelphia | United States | Liacouras Center |
| April 4, 2013 | Fairfax | United States | Patriot Center |
| April 6, 2013 | Uncasville | United States | Mohegan Sun Arena |
| April 7, 2013 | New York City | United States | Barclays Center |
| April 9, 2013 | Providence | United States | Dunkin' Donuts Center |
| April 11, 2013 | Toronto | Canada | Air Canada Centre |
| April 12, 2013 | Quebec City | Canada | Colisée Pepsi |
| April 16, 2013 | Berkeley | United States | Hearst Greek Theatre |
| April 18, 2013 | Los Angeles | United States | Los Angeles Memorial Sports Arena |
| May 24, 2013 | Milan | Italy | Fiera Milano Live |
| May 25, 2013 | Trieste | Italy | Piazza Unità d'Italia |
| May 27, 2013 | Belgrade | Serbia | Kalemegdan Park |
| May 29, 2013 | Vienna | Austria | Trabrennbahn Krieau |
| June 1, 2013 | London | England | Emirates Stadium |
| June 5, 2013 | Rome | Italy | Ippodromo Le Capannelle |
| June 6, 2013 | Casalecchio di Reno | Italy | Unipol Arena |
| June 8, 2013^{[A]} | Nuremberg | Germany | Zeppelinfeld |
| June 9, 2013^{[B]} | Nürburg | Germany | Nürburgring |
| June 16, 2013^{[C]} | Landgraaf | Netherlands | Pinkpop |
| June 18, 2013 | Łódź | Poland | Atlas Arena |
| June 21, 2013 | Moscow | Russia | Olimpiyskiy |
| June 23, 2013 | Saint Petersburg | Russia | SKK Peterburgsky |
| June 25, 2013 | Tallinn | Estonia | Tallinn Song Festival Grounds |
| June 26, 2013^{[D]} | Helsinki | Finland | Hietaniemi Beach |
| June 28, 2013^{[E]} | Norrköping | Sweden | Bråvalla flygflottilj |
| June 30, 2013 | Oslo | Norway | Ullevaal Stadion |
| July 2, 2013 | Copenhagen | Denmark | Refshaleøen |
| July 4, 2013^{[F]} | Werchter | Belgium | Werchter Festival Grounds |
| July 5, 2013^{[G]} | Arras | France | Citadelle d'Arras |
| July 7, 2013^{[H]} | Montreux | Switzerland | Auditorium Stravinski |
| July 8, 2013^{[I]} | Locarno | Switzerland | Piazza Grande |
| July 10, 2013^{[J]} | Nîmes | France | Arena of Nîmes |
| July 12, 2013^{[K]} | Oeiras | Portugal | Passeio Marítimo de Algés |
| July 13, 2013^{[L]} | Bilbao | Spain | Kobetamendi Park |
| August 21, 2013 | London | England | O_{2} Academy Brixton |
| August 23, 2013^{[M]} | Reading | England | Little John's Farm |
| August 24, 2013^{[N]} | Wetherby | England | Bramham Park |

Festivals and other miscellaneous performances

^{A} This concert was a part of "Rock im Park"
^{B} This concert was a part of "Rock am Ring"
^{C} This concert was a part of the "Pinkpop Festival"
^{D} This concert was a part of the "Rock the Beach Festival"
^{E} This concert was a part of the "Bråvalla Festival"
^{F} This concert was a part of "Rock Werchter"
^{G} This concert was a part of the "Main Square Festival"
^{H} This concert was a part of the "Montreux Jazz Festival"
^{I} This concert was a part of "Moon and Stars"
^{J} This concert was a part of the "Festival de Nîmes"
^{K} This concert was a part of "Optimus Alive!"
^{L} This concert was a part of "Bilbao BBK Live"
^{M} This concert was a part of the Reading Festival
^{N} This concert was a part of the Leeds Festival

== Personnel ==
Green Day

- Billie Joe Armstrong – lead vocals, harmonica, lead and rhythm guitars
- Mike Dirnt – bass, backing vocals
- Tré Cool – drums, percussion, backing vocals on "King For A Day/Shout"

Additional Musicians

- Jason Freese – keyboards, piano, saxophone, accordion, backing vocals
- Jeff Matika – rhythm guitar, acoustic guitar, backing vocals
- Jason White – lead and rhythm guitars, backing vocals
