= Amy (song) =

Song by Green Day

from the album ¡Dos!
- Released: November 9, 2012
- Recorded: 2012
- Studio: Jingletown Studios, Oakland, California
- Genre: Soul
- Length: 3:25
- Label: Reprise
- Songwriters: Billie Joe Armstrong; Mike Dirnt; Tré Cool
- Producers: Rob Cavallo, Green Day

"Amy" is a song by American rock band Green Day, released as the closing track on their tenth studio album, ¡Dos! (2012). It was written by Billie Joe Armstrong, Mike Dirnt, and Tré Cool, and the song was produced by Rob Cavallo. "Amy" is a ballad written in tribute to Amy Winehouse, and marked a departure from the band's typical sound.

== Background and composition ==
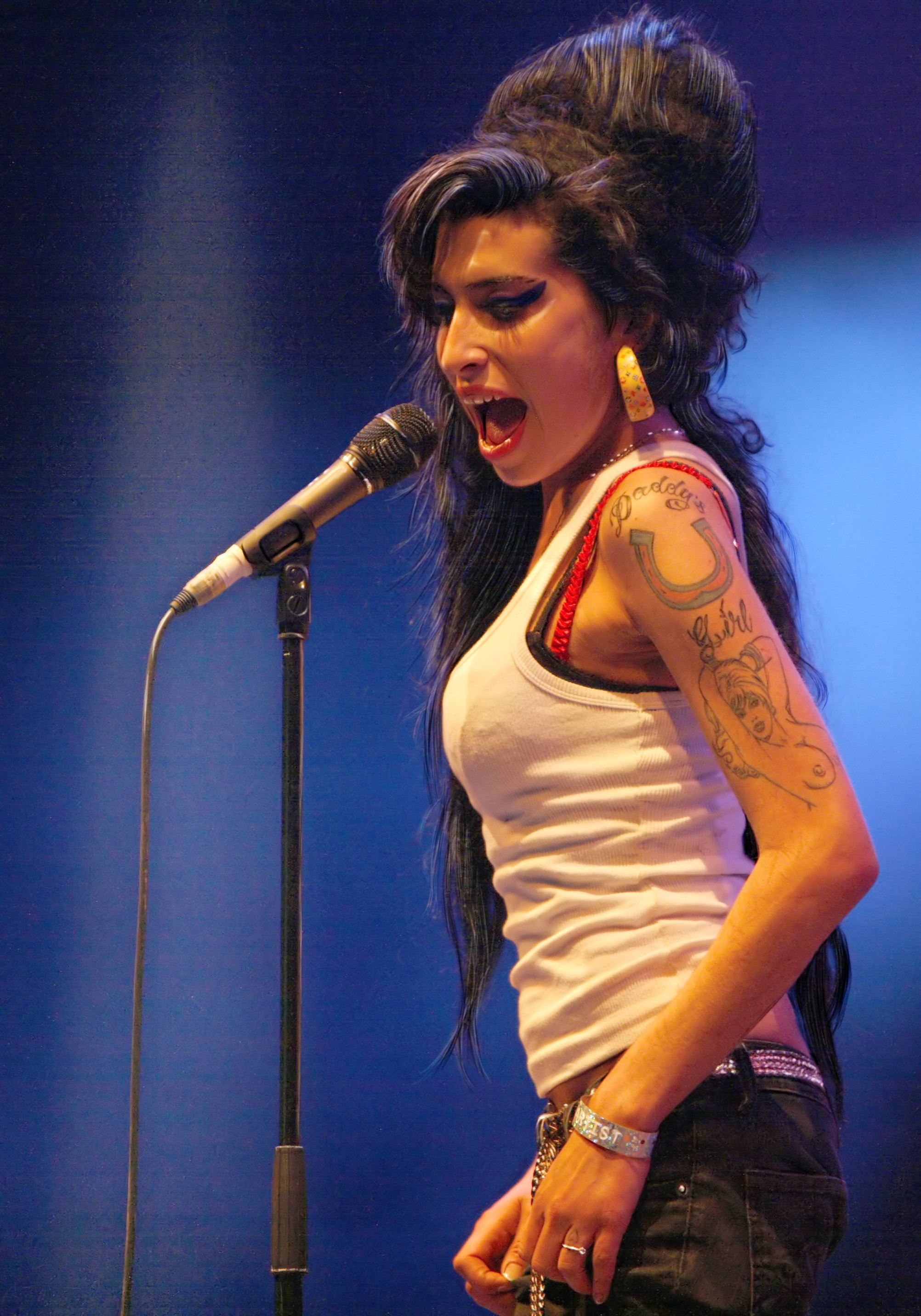
"Amy" was written as a tribute to Amy Winehouse (pictured)

"Amy" was written by Armstrong as a tribute to English singer Amy Winehouse, who died of alcohol poisoning on July 23, 2011. Despite the two artists never having met, Armstrong commented that he was a fan of Winehouse's music and described her death as "tragic". The song was first performed on August 12 at a secret charity show in Costa Mesa, California, with Armstrong commenting he had written "Amy" the week before. The song was later released as the closing track on their studio album ¡Dos! on November 9, 2012.

The song is a mournful ballad incorporating the jazz-inspired styles of Winehouse through "stripped-back guitar work" and "sparse fingerpicking" reminiscent of folk rock, doo-wop and lounge music. It is one of two solo numbers on ¡Dos! featuring only Armstrong. Lyrically, the song serves as a cautionary tale through its multiple allusions to Winehouse's "troubled" life and death, and speaks about Armstrong's desire to have met the late singer. Because of its acoustic sound and mellow nature atypical of Green Day songs, "Amy" has been compared to "Good Riddance (Time of Your Life)". Armstrong explained this difference by stating that the somber tone of the song deals with the "consequences of the party".

== Reception ==
"Amy" has received a positive reception since its release, with critics calling it "heartfelt" and a standout on ¡Dos!. Rolling Stone described "Amy" as a "mascara-streaked soul ballad... where Billie Joe Armstrong makes like the skate-park Sam Cooke", while Loudwire and Alternative Press stylistically compared the song to the Everly Brothers and Elvis Costello, respectively. The Guardian called the song a "surprisingly poignant tribute", while critics at NME praised the song as "slight but touching". Billboard called "Amy" one of the band's strongest ballads, specifically noting of the song's "unadorned" nature, while Entertainment Weekly called "Amy" one of the best songs recorded in 2012. However, "Amy" has also been described by critics as "uncomfortable", with the BBC calling it a "slightly awkward finale". The A.V. Club commented that "sentiment isn't enough to salvage the song", calling it "listless".

== Usage in media ==
In 2012, "Amy" was included at the beginning of the CSI: NY episode "Unspoken", alongside other songs from the band's ¡Uno!, ¡Dos!, ¡Tré! trilogy. Executive producer Pam Veasey chose the song because it "beautifully accompanied the visuals" of the episode.

== Credits and personnel ==
- Billie Joe Armstrong – producer, songwriter
- Mike Dirnt – producer, songwriter
- Tré Cool – producer, songwriter
- Rob Cavallo – producer
