= The Forgotten (Green Day song) =

- Japanese promo CD

Promotional single by Green Day

from the album ¡Tré! and The Twilight Saga: Breaking Dawn – Part 2 (Original Motion Picture Soundtrack)
- Released: October 30, 2012
- Recorded: February 14–June 26, 2012
- Genre: Alternative rock
- Length: 4:59
- Label: Reprise
- Songwriters: Billie Joe Armstrong; Mike Dirnt; Tré Cool
- Producers: Rob Cavallo, Green Day

Green Day singles chronology
"Stray Heart" (2012)	"The Forgotten" (2012)	"X-Kid" (2013)

Music video
- "The Forgotten" on YouTube

"The Forgotten" is a song by the American rock band Green Day and is featured as the closing track on their eleventh studio album, ¡Tré! (2012). The song is also available on The Twilight Saga: Breaking Dawn – Part 2 soundtrack, which was released on November 13, 2012, and was released October 30, 2012. It was recorded at Jingletown Studios from February 14 to June 26, 2012, and produced by Rob Cavallo and Green Day. It is the fifth overall single from the ¡Uno!, ¡Dos! & ¡Tré! trilogy.

== Background ==
The track list for The Twilight Saga: Breaking Dawn – Part 2 was revealed on October 4, 2012, this included "The Forgotten" by Green Day, which also would be in their eleventh studio album, ¡Tré!.

Mike Dirnt, bassist of the band said in an interview at the 2012 MTV Video Music Awards: "When we were asked to be part of the 'Twilight: Breaking Dawn - Part 2' soundtrack, we accepted without hesitation because it is an amazing cultural phenomenon" and also said "We have always been impressed with how careful they are with all the series soundtracks".

== Music video ==
The music video was premiered on October 23, 2012, on MTV. The video features images from The Twilight Saga: Breaking Dawn – Part 2 along with the band recording the song and the album as well as performing live on stage.

== Reception ==
Rolling Stone magazine stated: "The strings return for ¡Tré!'s closing song, "The Forgotten," a five-minute piano ballad that unfolds like a lost track from the second side of Abbey Road. "Don't look away from the arms of love," Billie Joe Armstrong sings, as he brings the trilogy in for a sweet, soft landing." Entertainment Weekly said "The Forgotten" was the best song of the album.

Alternative Press said the piano line of the song is one of the limpest things the trio have ever recorded.

By December 20, 2012, "The Forgotten" had sold 4,000 downloads as the lead single to Twilight: Breaking Dawn – Part 2.

== Charts ==
Chart (2012)	Peak position
Japan (Japan Hot 100)	11
UK Rock (Official Charts Company)	39
