= Demolicious =

Compilation album by Green Day
- Released: April 19, 2014
- Recorded: 2010–2012
- Studio: Jingletown Studios in Oakland, California
- Genre: Punk rock
- Length: 62:44
- Label: Reprise

Green Day chronology
¡Tré! (2012)	Demolicious (2014)	Revolution Radio (2016)

Demolicious is a compilation album by American rock band Green Day. It was released on Record Store Day on April 19, 2014. It is a collection of demo versions of songs from their ¡Uno! ¡Dos! ¡Tré! album trilogy. The album also includes the previously unreleased "State of Shock" and an acoustic version of "Stay the Night". It was released on double vinyl, CD, and cassette tape. The cover art was designed by comic book artist Tom Neely with Kristina Collantes.

== Theme and composition ==
Mike Dirnt published the album's cover on his official Instagram account, stating "this is how ¡Uno!, ¡Dos! and ¡Tré! would have sounded if we were still on Lookout Records".

== Critical reception ==
Professional ratings
Review scores
Source	Rating
AllMusic	3.5/5 stars
Punknews.org	1.5/5 stars

Fred Thomas at AllMusic notes that the album is much more raw and "more exciting" than the album trilogy that the songs came from. He goes on to state "Though more stripped-down and loose than usual album fare, the tunes on Demolicious end up feeling more direct".

== Track listing ==
All lyrics are written by Billie Joe Armstrong; all music is composed by Green Day (Armstrong, Mike Dirnt, and Tré Cool).

No.	Title	Originally from	Length
1.	"99 Revolutions" (Demo)	¡Tré!	4:06
2.	"Angel Blue" (Demo)	¡Uno!	2:55
3.	"Carpe Diem" (Demo)	¡Uno!	3:39
4.	"State of Shock" (Demo)	Previously unreleased	2:28
5.	"Let Yourself Go" (Demo)	¡Uno!	3:00
6.	"Sex, Drugs & Violence" (Demo)	¡Tré!	3:25
7.	"Ashley" (Demo)	¡Dos!	2:47
8.	"Fell for You" (Demo)	¡Uno!	3:12
9.	"Stay the Night" (Demo)	¡Uno!	4:40
10.	"Nuclear Family" (Demo)	¡Uno!	3:03
11.	"Stray Heart" (Demo)	¡Uno!	3:50
12.	"Rusty James" (Demo)	¡Uno!	4:15
13.	"A Little Boy Named Train" (Demo)	¡Tré!	3:57
14.	"Baby Eyes" (Demo)	¡Dos!	2:15
15.	"Makeout Party" (Demo)	¡Dos!	3:12
16.	"Oh Love" (Demo)	¡Uno!	5:13
17.	"Missing You" (Demo)	¡Tré!	3:41
18.	"Stay the Night" (Acoustic)	Previously unreleased mix	3:09
Total length:			62:44

== Personnel ==
Green Day

- Billie Joe Armstrong – lead vocals, guitar
- Mike Dirnt – bass guitar, backing vocals
- Tré Cool – drums
- Jason White – guitar

Production

- Chris Dugan – recording, mixing
- Tom Neely, Kristina Collantes – artwork

== Charts ==
Chart (2014)	Peak position
Australian Albums (ARIA)	170
Italian Albums (FIMI)	31
UK Albums (OCC)	119
UK Rock & Metal Albums (OCC)	4
US Billboard 200	112
US Top Alternative Albums (Billboard)	18
US Top Rock Albums (Billboard)	24
US Indie Store Album Sales (Billboard)	1
