= ¡Cuatro! =

- Official promotional poster
- Directed by: Tim Wheeler
- Produced by: Tim Lynch
- Starring: Billie Joe Armstrong; Mike Dirnt; Tré Cool; Jason White; Rob Cavallo
- Cinematography: Greg Schneider; Alex Kopps; Chris Dugan
- Edited by: Tim Wheeler
- Production company: Farm League
- Distributed by: Reprise Records
- Release date: September 24, 2013
- Running time: 105 minutes
- Country: United States

¡Cuatro! is a 2013 rockumentary starring the punk rock band Green Day, directed by Tim Wheeler. The film documents the creation of the band's 2012 album trilogy, ¡Uno!, ¡Dos! and ¡Tré! The documentary, directed by Tim Wheeler and produced by Tim Lynch (who had previously produced Green Day's Bullet in a Bible in 2005), was released through Reprise Records on September 24, 2013. A 40-minute version of the documentary premiered on VH1 in 2012. The documentary contains footage of Green Day's producer Rob Cavallo and Green Day's days composing and organizing the trilogy until their release. ¡Cuatro! was nominated for a Grammy Award for Best Music Film.

== Content ==
¡Cuatro! contains footage of Green Day in the studio composing, organizing, practicing and discussing the albums, as well as speaking on their approach to recording an album trilogy. The documentary also contains live footage of Green Day performing their new songs at small club shows across the United States in 2011 and 2012.

== Production ==
When Green Day entered the studio to record the trilogy, multiple clips were posted on the band's YouTube channel of them creating the albums. Mike Dirnt, bassist of Green Day said that "Over the last year while we were recording our trilogy, we posted multiple clips every week so fans can see parts of the recording process of ¡Uno! ¡Dos! ¡Tré!. ¡Quatro! brings our fans one step closer by giving them even more access and revealing what it was like for us to make these records." Lead guitarist and vocalist of Green Day, Billie Joe Armstrong told Billboard that their aim for ¡Cuatro! as a documentary was "not going to be the sitting down, head shot of me going, 'We started out blah blah blah'. "We wanted to get into lifestyles of rock 'n' roll and playing rock 'n' roll and letting the story kind of tell itself rather than create revisionist (history)." Green Day drummer Tré Cool told BBC Breakfast that the purpose of the documentary was to show fans what it's like to make a record by giving them an inside look at the process, saying that "People ask what is it like to make a record. It's like someone asking what a sausage tastes like, you can describe it – or you can just hand someone a sausage."

== Release and reception ==
A documentary about the making of ¡Uno! ¡Dos! ¡Tré! was announced July 9, 2012, ¡Cuatro!, which at the time was titled ¡Quatro!, was later confirmed on November 21, 2012. A 40-minute version of the documentary premiered a week after on VH1 on November 28, 2012, and subsequently aired on MTV2 and Palladia. The full documentary made its debut showing at the Winter X Games XVII in January 2013, and was later screened again at SXSW in March 2013. ¡Cuatro! was originally released exclusively to ¡Uno!, ¡Dos!, ¡Tre! box set purchasers on April 8, 2013, and was later released bundled with ¡Tre! on August 26, 2013. The documentary was released by itself on DVD and digitally on September 24, 2013.

¡Cuatro! received generally positive reviews upon release. Crackle gave the film a score 4 out of 5. ¡Cuatro! was also nominated for a Grammy Award for Best Music Film.

Chart (2013)	Peak position
Australia (ARIA Music DVDs)	26

== Personnel ==
- Billie Joe Armstrong – guitar, lead vocals
- Mike Dirnt – bass guitar, backing vocals
- Tré Cool – drums
- Jason White – guitar
- Rob Cavallo – producer of ¡Uno! ¡Dos! ¡Tré!

Production

- Tim Lynch – producer
- Pat Magnerella – executive producer
- Tieneke Pavesic – associate producer
- Michael Pizzo – co-producer
- Devin Sarno – associate producer

Cinematography

- Joseph Aguirre
- Chris Dugan
- Alex Kopps
- Greg Schneider

Film editing

- Tim Wheeler

Sound department

- Chris Dugan – mixing
- Tim Hoogenakker – sound re-recording mixer
