= X-Kid =

Single by Green Day

from the album ¡Tré!
- Released: February 12, 2013
- Recorded: February 14–June 26, 2012 at Jingletown Studios in Oakland, California
- Genre: Pop punk; power pop
- Length: 3:42
- Label: Reprise; Warner Bros.
- Songwriters: Billie Joe Armstrong; Mike Dirnt; Tré Cool
- Producers: Rob Cavallo; Green Day

Green Day singles chronology
"The Forgotten" (2012)	"X-Kid" (2013)	"Xmas Time of the Year" (2015)

Music video
- "X-Kid" on YouTube "X-Kid (Video Contest Finalist)" on YouTube

"X-Kid" is a song by American rock band Green Day. It is the fifth track on their eleventh studio album, ¡Tré! (2012), and was released as the second single from the album on February 12, 2013, and is the sixth and final single from the ¡Uno!, ¡Dos! & ¡Tré! trilogy.

== Background and release ==
"X-Kid" was released as a single on February 12, 2013. On December 19, 2012, a video was released to Green Day's official YouTube channel showing "X-Kid" playing on a cassette tape.

== Theme and composition ==
"X-Kid"
A sample of "X-Kid from Green Day's ¡TRE! Album ".

According to The A.V. Club, "X-Kid" has "a rousing intro" which becomes a "hybrid" of "Who Wrote Holden Caulfield?" and "One Of My Lies", two songs from Green Day's second studio album, Kerplunk.

== Song meaning ==
“X-Kid” from ¡Tré! deals with the suicide of a close friend of the band's. “I don’t really want to get into it,” Armstrong says. “It’s too heavy.”

== Critical reception ==
Ray Rahman of Entertainment Weekly named "X-Kid" as the best song on ¡Tre!, above "Brutal Love" and "Missing You".

== Chart positions ==
Chart (2013)	Peak position
Canada Rock (Billboard)	38
US Hot Rock & Alternative Songs (Billboard)	48
US Rock & Alternative Airplay (Billboard)	36
