= Xmas Time of the Year =

Single by Green Day
- Released: December 24, 2015 (YouTube); November 29, 2019 (streaming)
- Genre: Pop punk; punk rock; Christmas
- Length: 2:17
- Songwriter(s): Billie Joe Armstrong; Mike Dirnt; Tré Cool
- Producer(s): Chris Dugan; Green Day

Green Day singles chronology
"X-Kid" (2013)	"Xmas Time of the Year" (2015)	"Bang Bang" (2016)

Audio
- "Xmas Time of the Year" on YouTube

"Xmas Time of the Year" is a Christmas song recorded by American rock band Green Day. The song was released on December 24, 2015, to YouTube without any prior announcement about recording or releasing the song.

On November 29, 2019, the song was released to music streaming services such as Spotify and Apple Music, along with new cover artwork reflecting their then-current album cycle, Father of All Motherfuckers.
