= Stray Heart =

Single by Green Day

from the album ¡Dos!
- Released: October 15, 2012
- Recorded: February 14–June 26, 2012
- Studio: Jingletown Studios, Oakland, California
- Genre: Garage rock; pop punk
- Length: 3:44
- Label: Reprise; Warner Bros.
- Songwriters: Billie Joe Armstrong; Mike Dirnt; Tré Cool
- Producers: Rob Cavallo; Green Day

Green Day singles chronology
"Let Yourself Go" (2012)	"Stray Heart" (2012)	"The Forgotten" (2012)

Music video
- "Stray Heart" on YouTube

"Stray Heart" is a song by American rock band Green Day. It is the seventh track on their tenth studio album, ¡Dos! (2012), and was released as the only single from the album in Europe and Australia on October 15, 2012. It is also the fourth single from the ¡Uno!, ¡Dos! & ¡Tré! trilogy. The song is swapped on the vinyl version of ¡Dos! with the song "Drama Queen" from ¡Tré!, due to the records being printed before the switch, meaning "Drama Queen" appears on both ¡Dos! and ¡Tré!, and that "Stray Heart" never saw a release on vinyl.

The single was certified gold by the Federation of the Italian Music Industry for downloads exceeding 15,000 units in Italy.

== Background and release ==
"Stray Heart" premiered on Idiot Club, Green Day's official fan club, on October 8, 2012, and premiered on Zane Lowe's BBC Radio 1 show on the same day. It was then released as the album's lead single on October 15 in the UK. On October 18, it was announced on Idiot Club that fans could go to downtown LA to appear in the music video for the song on October 19.

"Stray Heart" was also played by Foxboro Hot Tubs as both a warm-up song and a practice song.

== Theme and composition ==
"Stray Heart"
The sample of their single from Dos.

"Stray Heart" blends the pop punk sound of Green Day with the garage rock sound of their side project Foxboro Hot Tubs.

The song has been described as "an amped-up Motown bounce recalling Britpop progenitors the Jam's classic "A Town Called Malice", but with speaker-bursting modern-rock dynamics".

== Music video ==
On November 7, 2012, a music video for "Stray Heart" was released. The video starts with a man (Alex Knox) looking for records at a record store and buying some Green Day vinyl including ¡Uno!, ¡Dos! and ¡Tré!, but as he gives the records to his girlfriend (Leven Rambin), she sees a hole in his chest where his heart should be, and she slams the door on him. As the man is walking down the street, he gets strange reactions and sees trails of blood on the pavements. He follows the trail and chases the heart around the town, where he finally gets to it outside the girl's apartment, where she throws the records back at him. The video was directed by Robert Schober (aka RoboShobo).

== Artwork ==
The artwork of "Stray Heart" features a white background with little black dots at the sides; "Green Day" and "Stray Heart" are written in capital black letters using the same font. "Green Day" is placed at the top, and "Stray Heart" is written below. Pink lip stain is shown at the right side, while below the lips there are bones crossed in an X-form, colored in black.

== Critical reception ==
Jon Dolan of Rolling Stone rated the song a three and a half out five stars, commenting "It's not their most high-concept experiment, but it's a pretty fun one".

== Credits and personnel ==
- Songwriting: Billie Joe Armstrong, Mike Dirnt, Tré Cool
- Production: Rob Cavallo, Green Day

== Chart positions ==
Weekly chart performance for "Stray Heart"
Chart (2012–13)	Peak position
Belgium (Ultratip Flanders)	20
Israel International Airplay (Media Forest)	8
South Korea (Gaon Chart)	23
UK Rock (Official Charts Company)	16

== Certifications ==
Region	Certification	Certified units/sales
Italy (FIMI)	Gold	15,000^{*}
^{*} Sales figures based on certification alone.
