= ¡Tré! =

Studio album by Green Day
- Released: December 7, 2012
- Recorded: February 14 – June 26, 2012
- Studios: Jingletown Recording, Oakland, California; Ocean Way Recording, Los Angeles, California
- Genres: Pop punk; alternative rock; power pop
- Length: 46:35
- Label: Reprise
- Producers: Rob Cavallo; Green Day

Green Day chronology
| ¡Dos! (2012) | ¡Tré! (2012) | Demolicious (2014) |

Green Day studio chronology
| ¡Dos! (2012) | ¡Tré! (2012) | Revolution Radio (2016) |

Singles from ¡Tré!
- 1. "X-Kid" Released: February 12, 2013

¡Tré! (stylized in all caps) is the eleventh studio album by the American rock band Green Day, released on December 7, 2012. It is the third and final installment in the ¡Uno! ¡Dos! ¡Tré! trilogy, a series of studio albums that were released from September to December 2012. Green Day started recording material for the album on February 14, 2012, and finished on June 26, 2012. ¡Tré! follows the power pop style of ¡Uno!, and the garage rock feel of ¡Dos!. The album's title (making a pun on tres, which should follow the previous two titles) is a nod to the band's drummer Tré Cool, who turned 40 years old two days after the release. Cool is also featured on the album's cover. It is the band's last album to feature touring guitarist Jason White as a studio performer.

¡Tré! was released on December 7, 2012, in Australia, December 10 in the UK and December 11 in the US, through Reprise Records. Producing first week sales of 58,000 copies, a low for the band, the album received generally positive reviews from critics.

== Recording and release ==
On April 11, 2012, Green Day announced that they would be releasing a trilogy of albums titled ¡Uno!, ¡Dos!, and ¡Tré! and stated that they would be released on September 25, 2012, November 13, 2012, and January 15, 2013, respectively, through Reprise Records. On August 22, Armstrong gave preview of some songs through his iPhone on Zane Lowe's show on BBC Radio 1 in the UK. The preview included a brief snippet of "8th Ave Serenade". The track listing for ¡Tré! was revealed at the beginning of their video for the promotional single "Nuclear Family" from ¡Uno! It was later released officially on the "Idiot Club" and was later posted on their website. The song "99 Revolutions" previously appeared in the film The Campaign. "99 Revolutions" also appeared in a trailer released by Green Day on their YouTube channel on June 21, 2012. On October 29, it was announced that the album's release will be pushed forward to December 11, 2012, due to Green Day having to cancel their upcoming 2012 section of their 2012/2013 tour and delay much of the 2013 leg. On November 1, Green Day released "Behind The Scenes of ¡Uno!, ¡Dos!, and ¡Tré! – Part 1" which featured the preview of the song "X-Kid". The release date of the ¡Tré! LPs were pushed back to February 12, 2013, presumably to correct the erroneous inclusion of "Stray Heart" on initial pressings of the album, replacing the track with "Drama Queen", as present on CD and digital releases of the album. Previews of "Missing You" and "Dirty Rotten Bastards" were featured on Green Day's ¡Cuatro! documentary.

=== Singles ===
The band released a video of a cassette tape playing for the song "X-Kid". They later confirmed it as the first single, which was released on February 12, 2013.

== Music and composition ==
Billie Joe Armstrong had said the following about the trilogy: Each of the three albums has a totally different vibe. "The first one is power pop. The second is more garage-y, Nuggets-type rock. And the third is supposed to be epic. With the first album you're getting in the mood to party. On the second one, you're at the party. And the third album you're cleaning up the mess." ¡Tré! will be geared more towards stadium rock and will have more of a grandiose sound complete with string arrangements and brass sections. He also went on to say that the mood of ¡Tré! will be "reflective" and explained the album would be a "mixed bag" with the sound fluctuating from the punk rock feel of Dookie (1994) and Insomniac (1995), the experimental elements of Nimrod (1997) and Warning (2000), and finishing with the stadium rock/rock opera sound taken from American Idiot (2004), and 21st Century Breakdown (2009). While musically, Rob Cavallo said that "They wanted to return to the simplicity of Dookie." "We also wanted to go pre-Dookie, back to our love of Fifties and Sixties music, close-to-the-bone rock and roll. You don't hear a gazillion parts. The majority of this is drums, bass, two guitars and vocals."

== Critical reception ==
Professional ratings
Aggregate scores
| Source | Rating |
|---|---|
| Metacritic | 64/100 |
Review scores
| Source | Rating |
| AllMusic | 3.5/5 stars |
| The A.V. Club | C+ |
| Entertainment Weekly | B+ |
| The Guardian | 3/5 stars |
| The Independent | 3/5 stars |
| NME | 5/10 |
| PopMatters | 5/10 |
| Rolling Stone | 4/5 stars |
| Slant Magazine | 2.5/5 stars |
| Spin | 6/10 |

At Metacritic, which assigns a normalized rating out of 100 to reviews from mainstream critics, ¡Tré! received an average score of 64, which indicates "generally favorable reviews", based on 19 reviews. Ray Rahman of Entertainment Weekly wrote that the album "lets their tightly wound hooks decompress, delivering stadium-worthy three-chord nods to various ghosts of rock past". AllMusic editor Stephen Thomas Erlewine felt that the album is "hookier and not as ponderous as ¡Uno! but not quite as breakneck as ¡Dos!", writing that it "feels like ... a collection of songs capturing the band at its loosest and poppiest, throwing away tunes without much care." Kerrang! cited it as "the best of the bunch". Although he found it to be "littered with head-scratching filler and awkward sonic diversions", Ryan Reed of Paste called ¡Tré! "more raw, pointed and hard-hitting than anything they've released in years".

Michael Hann of The Guardian felt that "it's got some pretty good songs – but they never get better than pretty good." Alternative Press commented that the album "feels scattershot and slapped together, making it difficult to enjoy on its own merits." Jason Heller of The A.V. Club observed a lack of "inspiration" and wrote that the album "succeeds most as an exercise in influence-dropping and self-recycling". Barry Nicolson of NME viewed its songs as formulaic and found "little to distinguish them" from songs in the trilogy's first two albums. AJ Ramirez of PopMatters criticized its instrumentation as "functional and characterless", while critiquing the trilogy in general, "The wide spread afforded by the ¡Uno!/¡Dos!/¡Tré! trilogy does not suit a band whose aptitudes include simplicity, energy, and irreverence." Stephanie Benson at Spin stated "¡Tré! is not nearly the vivacious "Let Yourself Go"/"Fuck Time" party of its two predecessors. The music may be just as strong, tight, and impeccable — this is a band that's been going at it for more than a quarter of a century, after all — but there's a lightness missing here, a lack of passion." Benson also compared some of the songs to those on Dookie and Nimrod.

== Commercial performance ==
The album debuted at number 13 on the US Billboard 200 chart, with first-week sales of 58,000 copies in the United States. This became the second consecutive Green Day album, after ¡Dos!, not to sell 100,000 records in its first week after signing to a major record label. As of October 2016, the album had sold 155,000 copies. The album debuted at number 31 on the UK charts with first-week sales of 24,000 and total sales of 62,000 as of October 13, 2016.

== Track listing ==
All lyrics are written by Billie Joe Armstrong; all music is composed by Green Day (Armstrong, Mike Dirnt, Tré Cool), except "Brutal Love", composed by Green Day and Sam Cooke.

| No. | Title | Length |
|---|---|---|
| 1. | "Brutal Love" | 4:54 |
| 2. | "Missing You" | 3:43 |
| 3. | "8th Avenue Serenade" | 2:36 |
| 4. | "Drama Queen" | 3:07 |
| 5. | "X-Kid" | 3:41 |
| 6. | "Sex, Drugs & Violence" | 3:31 |
| 7. | "A Little Boy Named Train" | 3:37 |
| 8. | "Amanda" | 2:28 |
| 9. | "Walk Away" | 3:45 |
| 10. | "Dirty Rotten Bastards" | 6:26 |
| 11. | "99 Revolutions" | 3:49 |
| 12. | "The Forgotten" | 4:58 |
| Total length: | | 46:35 |

Japan CD bonus tracks
| No. | Title | Length |
|---|---|---|
| 13. | "Nuclear Family" (Live at Shibuya-AX in Tokyo, Japan; August 16th, 2012) | 3:00 |
| 14. | "Stop When the Red Lights Flash" (Live at Shibuya-AX in Tokyo, Japan; August 16th, 2012) (additional downloadable track, also requires Japanese edition of ¡Uno! and ¡Dos! for activation.) | 2:43 |
| 15. | "Carpe Diem" (Live at Shibuya-AX in Tokyo, Japan; August 16th, 2012) (additional downloadable track, also requires Japanese edition of ¡Uno! and ¡Dos! for activation.) | 4:00 |
| 16. | "Kill the DJ" (Live at Shibuya-AX in Tokyo, Japan; August 16th, 2012) (additional downloadable track, also requires Japanese edition of ¡Uno! and ¡Dos! for activation.) | 4:22 |
| 17. | "99 Revolutions" (Live at Shibuya-AX in Tokyo, Japan; August 16th, 2012) (additional downloadable track, also requires Japanese edition of ¡Uno! and ¡Dos! for activation.) | 3:46 |

== Personnel ==
Credits for ¡Tré! adapted from liner notes.

Green Day

- Billie Joe Armstrong – guitar, vocals, piano
- Mike Dirnt – bass, vocals
- Tré Cool – drums, percussion

Additional musicians

- Jason White (Note: Despite being credited as a member of Green Day in the liner notes, Jason White has confirmed that he was never an official member of the band.) – guitar
- Tom Kitt – strings arrangements ("Brutal Love", "The Forgotten"), horn arrangement ("Brutal Love"), piano & backing vocals ("Brutal Love")

Production

- Rob Cavallo – producers
- Green Day – producers
- Chris Dugan – engineer
- Brad Kobylczak – second engineer
- Lee Bothwick – additional engineering
- Wesley Seidman – assistant engineering (Ocean Way Recording)
- Chris Lord-Alge – mixing
- Keith Armstrong – assistant mix engineer
- Nik Karpen – assistant mix engineer
- Brad Townsend – additional assistant mix engineer
- Andrew Schubert – additional assistant mix engineer
- Ted Jensen – mastering
- Kenny Butler – drum technician
- Mike Fasano – drum technician
- Eden Galindo – bass technician
- Andrew "Hans" Buscher – guitar technician
- Jaime Neely – assistant production
- Michelle Rogel – assistant production

Artwork

- Chris Bilheimer – art direction and design
- Felisha Tolentino – band photography
- Tré Cool – front and back cover photo
- Greg Schneider – stills

== Charts ==
Weekly chart performance for ¡Tré!
| Chart (2012) | Peak position |
|---|---|
| Austrian Albums Chart | 8 |
| Australian Albums Chart | 22 |
| Belgian Albums Chart (Flanders) | 36 |
| Belgian Albums Chart (Wallonia) | 57 |
| Canadian Albums Chart | 22 |
| Croatian Albums Chart | 11 |
| Danish Albums Chart | 38 |
| Dutch Albums Chart | 30 |
| Finnish Albums Chart | 41 |
| Germany Albums Chart | 17 |
| Hungarian Albums Chart | 9 |
| Irish Albums Chart | 37 |
| Italian Albums Chart | 17 |
| Japanese Albums Chart | 10 |
| Mexican Albums Chart | 44 |
| New Zealand Album Chart | 16 |
| Norwegian Albums Chart | 20 |
| Scottish Albums Chart | 29 |
| South Korean Albums Chart | 10 |
| Spanish Albums Chart | 41 |
| Swedish Albums Chart | 30 |
| Swiss Albums Chart | 14 |
| UK Albums Chart | 31 |
| UK Rock Albums Chart | 2 |
| US Billboard 200 | 13 |
| US Billboard Rock Albums | 3 |
| US Billboard Alternative Albums | 2 |
| US Billboard Digital Albums | 9 |
| US Billboard Tastemaker Albums | 5 |

== Certifications and sales ==
Certifications and sales for ¡Tré!
| Region | Certification | Certified units/sales |
|---|---|---|
| United Kingdom (BPI) | Silver | 60,000^{*} |
^{*} Sales figures based on certification alone.

== Release history ==
| Country | Date | Format |
|---|---|---|
| Australia | December 7, 2012 | CD, LP, digital download |
| United Kingdom | December 10, 2012 | CD, LP, digital download |
| United States | December 11, 2012 | CD, digital download |
| United States | January 15, 2013 | LP |
