= Green Day =

American rock band

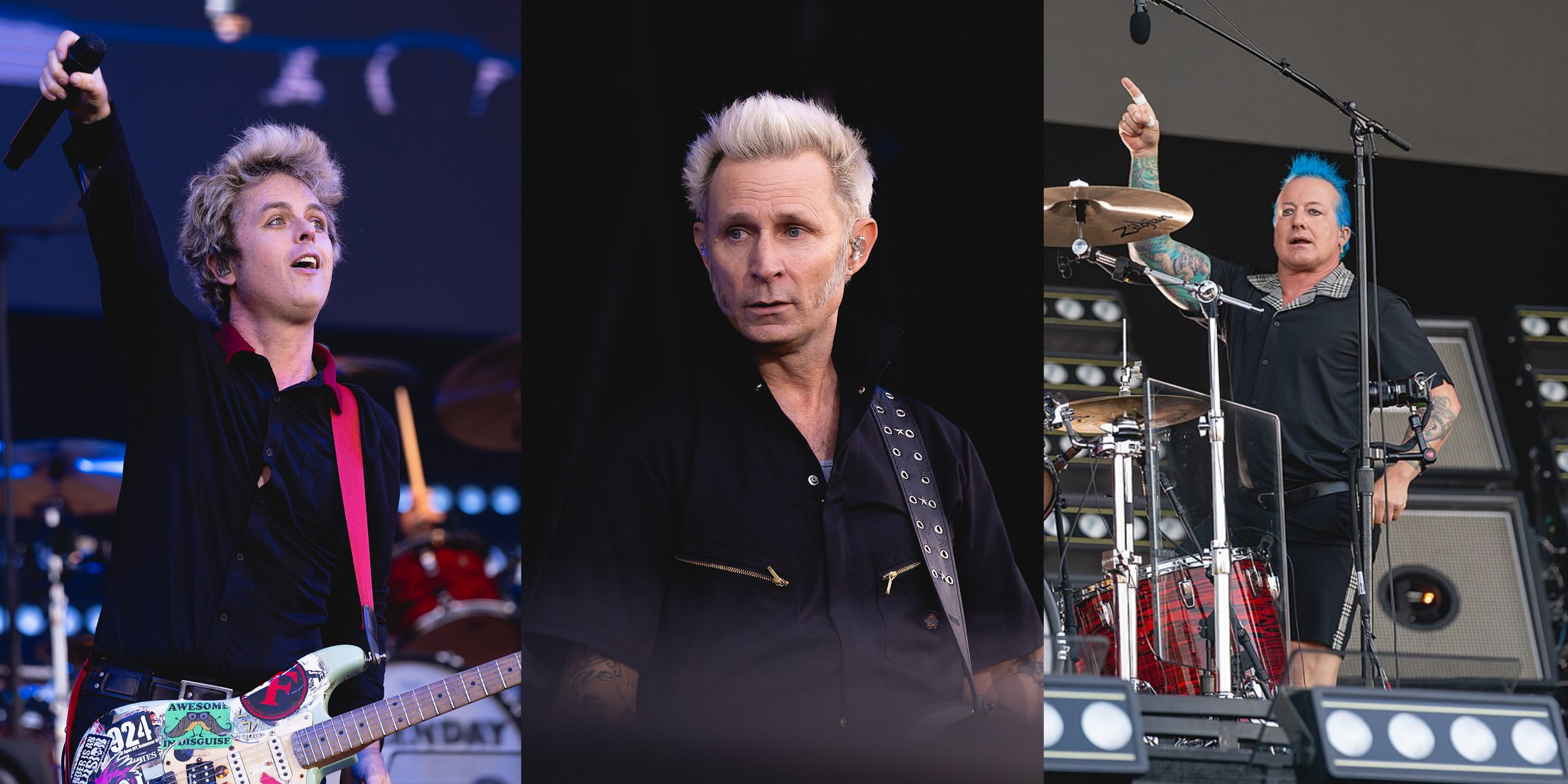
- (L–R): Billie Joe Armstrong, Mike Dirnt, and Tré Cool performing in 2024 on their Saviors Tour

Background information
- Also known as: Sweet Children (1987–1989, 2015); Blair Hess (1993)
- Origin: Rodeo, California, U.S.
- Genres: Punk rock; pop-punk; alternative rock; skate punk; power pop
- Works: Discography; songs
- Years active: 1987–present
- Labels: Lookout; Reprise; Epitaph; Warner
- Spinoffs: Pinhead Gunpowder; The Network; Foxboro Hot Tubs; The Coverups; The Longshot
- Awards: Full list
- Members: Billie Joe Armstrong; Mike Dirnt; Tré Cool
- Past members: Raj Punjabi; Sean Hughes; John Kiffmeyer
- Website: greenday.com
- Logo
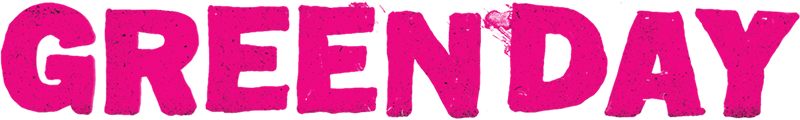

Green Day is an American rock band formed in Rodeo, California, in 1987 by lead singer and guitarist Billie Joe Armstrong and bassist and backing vocalist Mike Dirnt, with drummer Tré Cool joining in 1990. In 1994, their third album Dookie, released through Reprise Records, became a breakout success and eventually shipped over 20 million copies in the United States. Green Day has been credited with reigniting mainstream interest in punk rock.

Before taking its current name in 1989, the band was named Sweet Children. They were part of the late 1980s and early 1990s Bay Area punk scene that emerged from 924 Gilman Street, a club in Berkeley, California. The band's early releases were with Lookout! Records, including their first album 39/Smooth (1990). For most of the band's career, they have been a power trio with Cool, who replaced John Kiffmeyer in 1990, before the recording of the band's second studio album Kerplunk (1991). Though the albums Insomniac (1995), Nimrod (1997), and Warning (2000) did not match the success of Dookie, they were still successful, with Insomniac and Nimrod reaching double platinum status, while Warning achieved gold. Green Day's seventh album, a rock opera called American Idiot (2004), found popularity with a younger generation and sold six million copies in the US. Their next album 21st Century Breakdown was released in 2009. It was followed by a trilogy of albums, ¡Uno!, ¡Dos!, and ¡Tré!, released in September, November, and December 2012, respectively. The trilogy did not commercially perform as well as expected, in comparison to their previous albums, largely due to a lack of promotion and Armstrong entering rehab. These albums were followed by Revolution Radio (2016)—their third to debut at No. 1 on the Billboard 200—Father of All Motherfuckers (2020), and Saviors (2024).

In 2010, a stage adaptation of American Idiot debuted on Broadway. The musical was nominated for three Tony Awards: Best Musical, Best Scenic Design, and Best Lighting Design, winning the latter two. The band was inducted into the Rock and Roll Hall of Fame in 2015, their first year of eligibility. Members of the band have collaborated on the side projects Pinhead Gunpowder, the Network, Foxboro Hot Tubs, the Longshot, the Coverups, and have also worked on solo careers.

Green Day has sold roughly 75 million records worldwide as of 2024, making them one of the best-selling music artists. The group has been nominated for 20 Grammy Awards and won five: Best Alternative Album for Dookie, Best Rock Album for American Idiot and 21st Century Breakdown, Record of the Year for "Boulevard of Broken Dreams", and Best Musical Show Album for American Idiot: The Original Broadway Cast Recording.

== History ==
=== 1987–1993: Formation and Lookout! years ===
Concert poster, dated March 16, 1990, at 924 Gilman Street for Lookout!-signed punk bands, including Green Day, Neurosis, Samiam, and the Mr. T Experience.

In 1987, guitarist friends Billie Joe Armstrong and Mike Dirnt, both 15 years old at the time, along with bassist Sean Hughes and drummer Raj Punjabi, a fellow student from Pinole Valley High School, formed the band Desecrated Youth and played together in Punjabi's house garage in Rodeo, California.

A few months later, the band renamed to Sweet Children. One of their first songs written together was "Best Thing in Town". The group's first live performance took place on October 17, 1987, at Rod's Hickory Pit in Vallejo, California. In 1988, Armstrong and Dirnt began working with former Isocracy drummer John Kiffmeyer, also known as "Al Sobrante", who replaced Punjabi. It was around this time that Hughes also left the band, causing Dirnt to switch from guitar to bass. Armstrong cites the band Operation Ivy (featuring Tim Armstrong and Matt Freeman, who would later contact Armstrong to fill in as a second guitarist for their band Rancid) as a major influence in inspiring him to form a band.

In 1988, Larry Livermore, owner of Lookout! Records, saw the band play an early gig and signed them to his label. In April 1989, the band released its debut extended play 1,000 Hours. Shortly before the EP's release, the group dropped the name Sweet Children. According to Livermore, this was done to avoid confusion with another local band Sweet Baby. Sweet Children adopted the name Green Day, instead, due to the members' fondness for cannabis. In the Bay Area, where the band was formed, "green day" was slang for spending a day doing nothing but smoking marijuana. Armstrong admitted in 2001 that he considered it to be "the worst band name in the world".

Lookout! released Green Day's debut studio album 39/Smooth in early 1990. Green Day recorded two extended plays later that year, Slappy and Sweet Children, the latter of which included older songs the band recorded for Minneapolis independent label Skene! Records. In 1991, Lookout! Records re-released 39/Smooth as 1,039/Smoothed Out Slappy Hours and added the songs from the band's first two EPs, Slappy and 1,000 Hours. In late 1990, shortly after the band's first nationwide tour, Kiffmeyer left the East Bay area to attend Humboldt State University in Arcata, California. The Lookouts' drummer Tré Cool began filling in temporarily, and later permanently, a situation which Kiffmeyer "graciously accepted". The band went on tour for most of 1992 and 1993 and played a number of shows overseas in Europe. By then, the band's second studio album Kerplunk had sold 50,000 copies in the US. Green Day supported another California punk band Bad Religion as an opening act for their Recipe for Hate Tour for most of 1993.

=== 1993–1995: Signing with Reprise Records and breakthrough success ===
"Basket Case"
Sample of the seventh track and third single from Dookie. The song was about Armstrong's panic attacks.

"Longview"
This fourth track on Dookie was the album's debut single, and its music video was played frequently on MTV in late 1994.

Kerplunk's underground success led to interest from major record labels and a bidding war to sign Green Day. The band eventually left Lookout! and signed with Reprise Records after attracting the attention of producer Rob Cavallo. The group was impressed by his work with fellow Californian band the Muffs and later remarked that Cavallo "was the only person we could talk to and connect with". Reflecting on this period, Armstrong told Spin magazine in 1999, "I couldn't go back to the punk scene, whether we were the biggest success in the world or the biggest failure ... The only thing I could do was get on my bike and go forward." After signing with Reprise, the band began recording its major-label debut, Dookie. On September 3, 1993, Green Day played their last show at 924 Gilman under the pseudonym Blair Hess before being banned permanently because of their major label signing.

Recorded in three weeks and released in February 1994, Dookie became a commercial success, helped by extensive MTV airplay for the videos of the songs "Longview", "Basket Case", and "When I Come Around", all of which reached the number one position on the Modern Rock Tracks chart. The album went on to sell over 10 million copies in the US. At a performance on September 9, 1994, at Hatch Memorial Shell in Boston, mayhem broke out during the band's set (cut short to seven songs), and by the end of the rampage 100 people were injured and 45 arrested. The band also joined the lineups of both the festivals Lollapalooza and Woodstock '94, at the latter of which the group started an infamous mud fight. During the concert a security guard mistook Dirnt for a stage-invading fan and punched out some of his teeth. Viewed by millions on pay-per-view television, the Woodstock 1994 performance further aided Green Day's growing publicity and recognition. In 1995, Dookie won the Grammy Award for Best Alternative Album, and the band was nominated for nine MTV Video Music Awards, including Video of the Year.

In the band's homestead East Bay following Dookie's success, the band felt a sense of hostility. Armstrong recalled aggressive glares and furtive whispers. The band's success would trickle onto other East Bay bands such as Jawbreaker, a local favorite of Armstrong's, which garnered accusations of selling out during a concert he attended.

=== 1995–2002: Middle years and decline in popularity ===
In 1995, a single titled "J.A.R." for the Angus soundtrack was released and debuted at number one on the Billboard Modern Rock Tracks chart. The band's fourth studio album, Insomniac, was released on October 10, 1995. Compared to the more melodic Dookie, Insomniac was a much darker and heavier response to the band's newfound popularity. The album opened to warm critical reception, earning 4 of 5 stars from Rolling Stone, which said "In punk, the good stuff unfolds and gains meaning as you listen without sacrificing any of its electric, haywire immediacy. And Green Day are as good as this stuff gets." The singles released from Insomniac were "Geek Stink Breath", "Stuck with Me", "Brain Stew/Jaded", and "Walking Contradiction".

Though the album did not approach the success of Dookie, it sold three million copies in the United States. The album earned the band award nominations for Favorite Artist, Favorite Hard Rock Artist, and Favorite Alternative Artist at the 1996 American Music Awards, and the video for "Walking Contradiction" earned the band nominations for Best Video, Short Form, at the Grammys, in addition to Best Special Effects at the MTV Video Music Awards. After that, the band abruptly canceled a European tour, citing exhaustion.

Following a brief hiatus in 1996, Green Day began work on their next album in 1997. From the outset, Cavallo and the band agreed it had to be different from previous albums. The result was Nimrod, an experimental deviation from the band's standard melodic punk rock. The album was released in October 1997 and provided a variety of music, from punk, pop, hardcore, folk, surf rock, and ska, to the acoustic ballad "Good Riddance (Time of Your Life)". Nimrod entered the Billboard charts at Number 10. The mainstream success of "Good Riddance (Time of Your Life)" won the band an MTV Video Award for Best Alternative Video. The song was used in the second clip show episode of Seinfeld and two episodes of ER. The other singles released from Nimrod were "Nice Guys Finish Last", "Hitchin' a Ride", and "Redundant". The band made a guest appearance in an episode of King of the Hill later that year. In late 1997 and most of 1998, Green Day embarked on a tour in support of Nimrod. In 1999, Jason White began supporting the band during concerts as guitarist.

In 2000, Green Day released their folk punk-inspired sixth studio album Warning, and, in support, participated in that year's Warped Tour. In November 2000, in a show produced by Ian Brennan, the band performed for free on the steps on San Francisco's City Hall to protest the eviction of artists from the city. The band also launched an independent tour to support the album in 2001. Critics' reviews of the album were varied. AllMusic gave it 4.5/5, saying, "Warning may not be an innovative record per se, but it's tremendously satisfying." Rolling Stone was more critical, giving it 3/5 and saying, "Warning ... invites the question: Who wants to listen to songs of faith, hope and social commentary from what used to be snot core's biggest-selling band?" Though it produced the hit "Minority" and smaller hits "Warning" and "Waiting", some observers were coming to the conclusion that the band was losing relevance, and a decline in popularity followed. While all of Green Day's previous albums had reached at least triple platinum sales, Warning was only certified gold.

At the 2001 California Music Awards, Green Day won all eight awards for which they were nominated: Outstanding Album (Warning), Outstanding Punk Rock/Ska Album (Warning), Outstanding Group, Outstanding Male Vocalist, Outstanding Bassist, Outstanding Drummer, Outstanding Songwriter, and Outstanding Artist. The release of two compilation albums, International Superhits! in 2001 and Shenanigans in 2002, followed Warning. International Superhits! had a companion collection of music videos, International Supervideos! Shenanigans contained collected B-sides, including "Espionage", which was featured in the 1999 film Austin Powers: The Spy Who Shagged Me and nominated for a Grammy Award for Best Rock Instrumental Performance. In Spring 2002, Green Day co-headlined the Pop Disaster Tour with Blink-182, documented on the DVD Riding in Vans with Boys.

=== 2003–2006: American Idiot and renewed success ===
"American Idiot"
From American Idiot, this song was nominated for four Grammy awards in 2005.

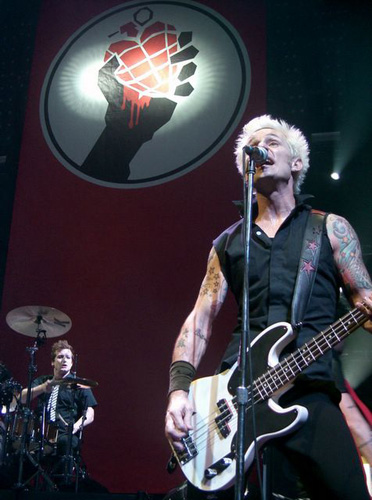
Cool (left) and Dirnt on July 27, 2005

In 2002, Green Day recorded an album tentatively titled Cigarettes and Valentines, set for release in August 2003. After the master recordings were stolen from the studio, Green Day decided to create a new album, American Idiot, feeling they could do better.

A band called the Network was signed to Armstrong's record label Adeline Records with little fanfare and information. After the band, who concealed their identities with masks and costumes, released an album called Money Money 2020 in September 2003, it was rumored that the Network was a Green Day side project, due to similarities in the bands' sounds. At the time, these rumors were not addressed by the band or Adeline Records, except for a statement on the Adeline website discussing an ongoing dispute between the two bands. The bands "feuded" via press releases and statements from Armstrong. Several journalists openly referred to the group as a Green Day side project, although this was not confirmed until 2013.

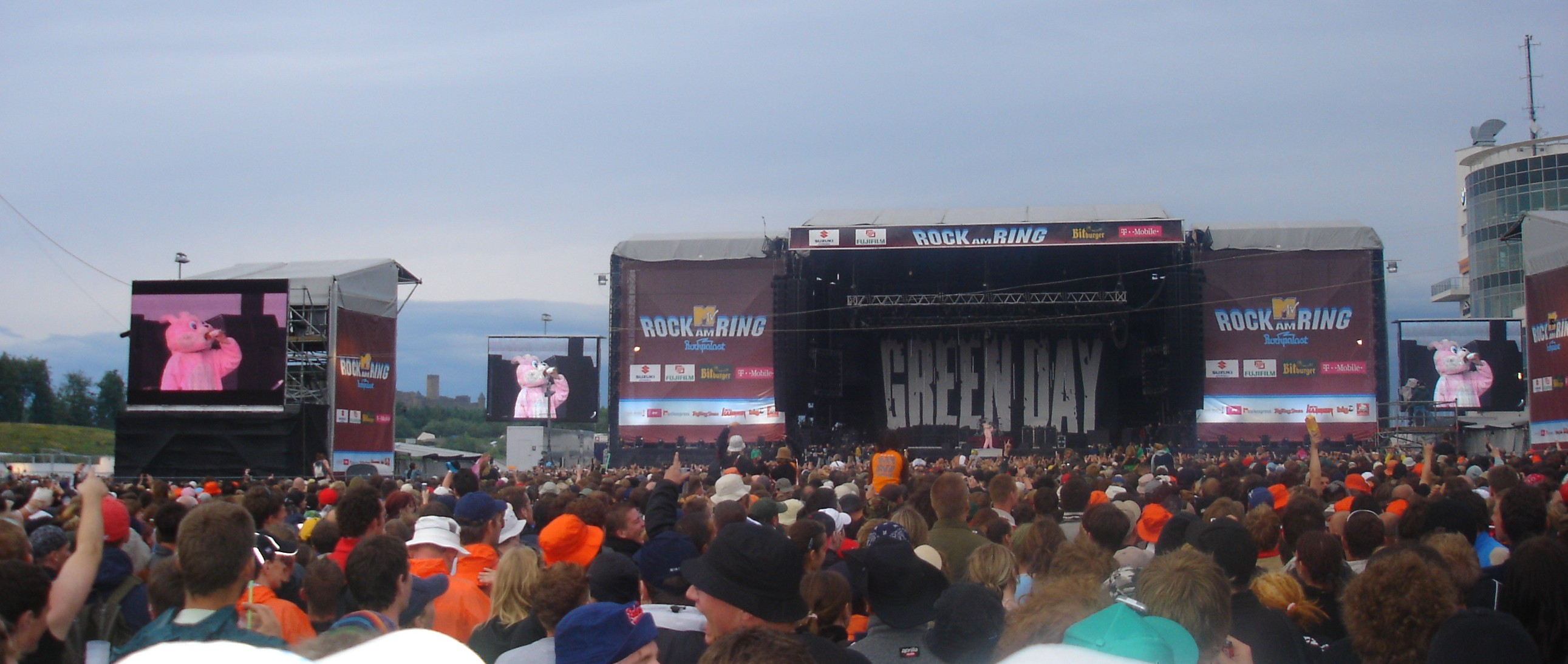
Green Day live in Germany during the American Idiot World Tour.

Green Day collaborated with Iggy Pop on two tracks for his album Skull Ring in November 2003. On February 1, 2004, a cover of "I Fought the Law" (originally performed by the Crickets) made its debut on a commercial for iTunes during NFL Super Bowl XXXVIII. American Idiot was released in September 2004 and debuted at number one on the Billboard 200 chart. Backed by the success of the first single, "American Idiot", it was the band's first album to reach this pinnacle. American Idiot was labeled a punk rock opera and follows the journey of the fictitious "Jesus of Suburbia". It depicts modern American life under the control of an idiot ruler who lets people be misinformed by the media and a "redneck agenda". It gives different angles on an everyman, modern icons, and leaders. Released two months before US President George W. Bush was reelected, it became protest art and went on to sell 6 million copies in the US.

"Boulevard of Broken Dreams"
"Boulevard of Broken Dreams" won a total of six awards at the 2005 MTV Music Video Awards and won Grammy Award for Record of the Year in 2006.

American Idiot won the 2005 Grammy for Best Rock Album and was nominated in six other categories, including Album of the Year. The album helped Green Day win seven of the eight awards it was nominated for at the 2005 MTV Video Music Awards; the "Boulevard of Broken Dreams" video won six of those awards. A year later, "Boulevard of Broken Dreams" won Grammy Award for Record of the Year. In 2009, Kerrang! named American Idiot the best album of the decade, NME ranked it number 60 in a similar list, and Rolling Stone ranked it 22nd. Rolling Stone also listed "Boulevard of Broken Dreams" and "American Idiot" among the 100 best songs of the 2000s, at number 65 and 47, respectively. In 2005, the album ranked 420 in Rock Hard magazine's book The 500 Greatest Rock & Metal Albums of All Time. In 2012, the album was ranked number 225 on Rolling Stone's list of the 500 Greatest Albums of All Time.

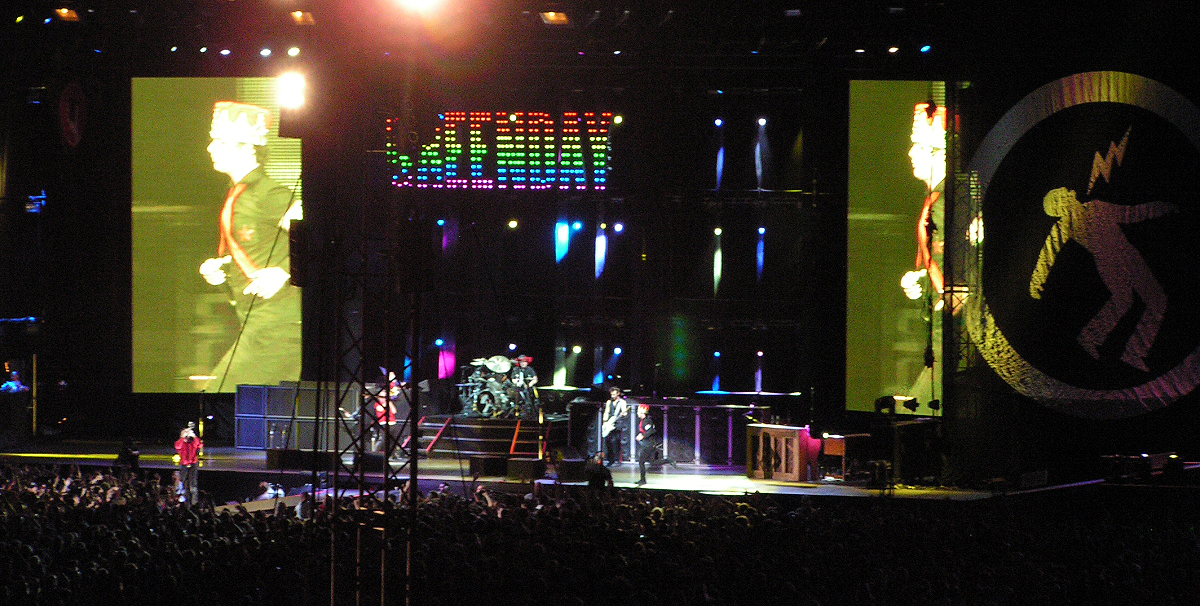
Green Day performing in New Jersey in 2005

During the American Idiot World Tour, Green Day filmed and recorded the two concerts at the Milton Keynes National Bowl in England. These recordings were released as a live CD and DVD set Bullet in a Bible on November 15, 2005. The DVD featured behind-the-scenes footage of the band and showed how its members prepared to put on the show. The final concerts of the 2005 world tour were in Sydney and Melbourne, Australia, on December 14 and 17, respectively.

On August 1, 2005, Green Day announced it had rescinded the master rights to its pre-Dookie material from Lookout Records, citing a continuing breach of contract regarding unpaid royalties, a complaint shared with other Lookout! bands. On January 10, 2006, Green Day received People's Choice Award for favorite musical group or band.

=== 2007–2011: 21st Century Breakdown and American Idiot's stage adaptation ===
Green Day engaged in many smaller projects in the time following the success of American Idiot. In 2008, under the name Foxboro Hot Tubs, the group released a garage-rock-inspired album, Stop Drop and Roll!!!. Foxboro Hot Tubs went on a mini tour to promote the record, hitting tiny Bay Area venues such as the Stork Club in Oakland and Toot's Tavern in Crockett, California.

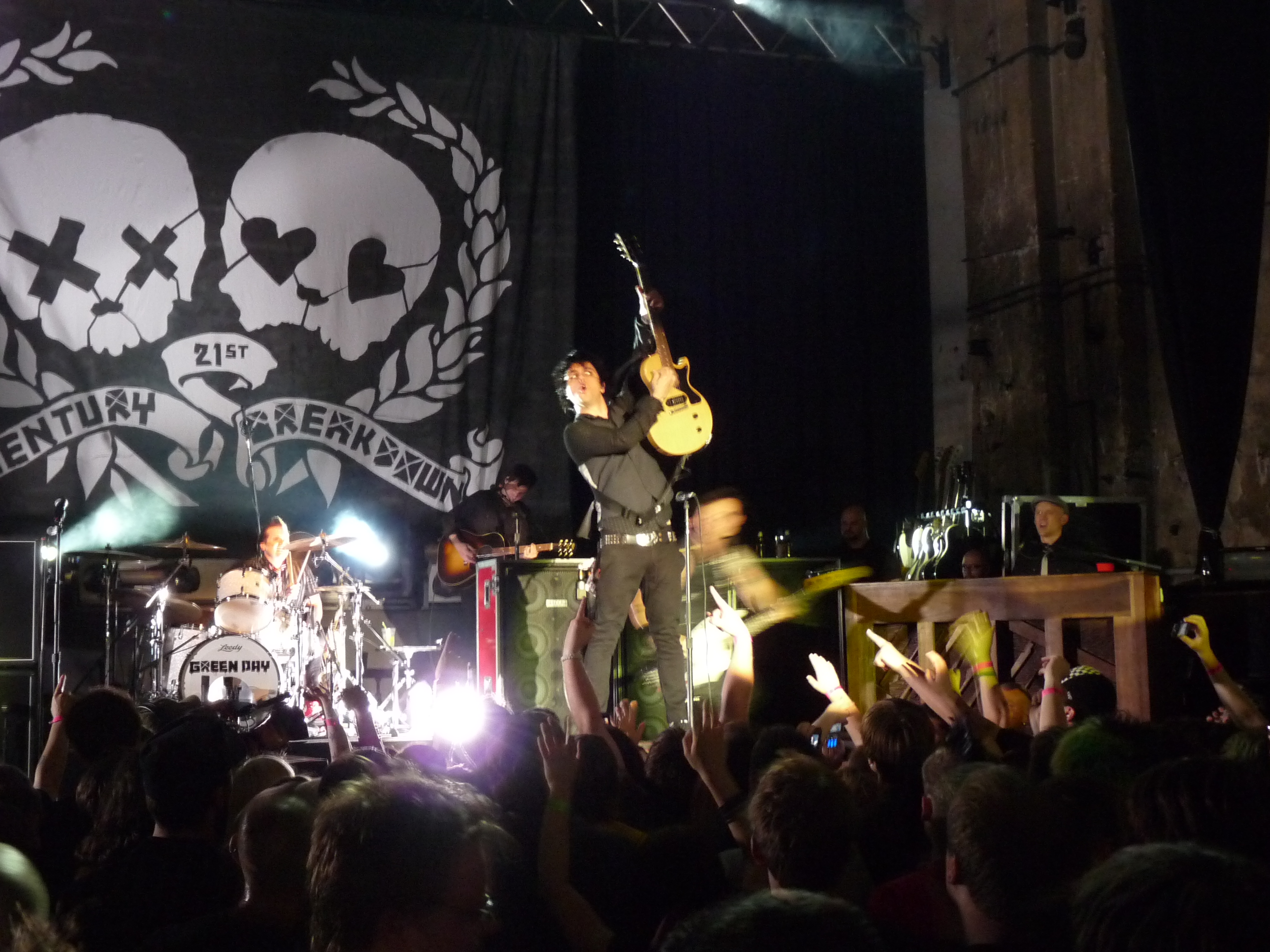
Green Day performing during a secret show at the Kesselhaus in Berlin on May 7, 2009

In an interview with Carson Daly, Garbage lead singer Shirley Manson revealed that the band's drummer Butch Vig would be producing Green Day's forthcoming album. The span of nearly five years between American Idiot and 21st Century Breakdown was the longest gap between studio albums in Green Day's career. The band had been working on new material since January 2006. By October 2007, Armstrong had 45 songs written, but the band showed no further signs of progress until October 2008, when two videos showing the band recording with producer Vig were posted on YouTube. The writing and recording process, spanning three years and four recording studios, was finally finished in April 2009.

"21 Guns"
The second single from 21st Century Breakdown was nominated for two Grammy awards in 2010: Grammy Award for Best Rock Performance by a Duo or Group with Vocal, and Best Rock Song.

21st Century Breakdown was released on May 15, 2009. The album received mainly positive reception from critics, who gave it an average rating between 3 and 4 stars. It reached number one in fourteen countries and was certified gold or platinum in each, achieving Green Day's best overall chart performance to date. The band started playing shows in California in April and early May. These were the group's first live shows in about three years. Green Day went on a world tour starting in North America in July 2009, and continued through the rest of 2009 and early 2010. The album won Grammy Award for Best Rock Album at the 52nd Grammy Awards on January 31, 2010. As of December 2010, 21st Century Breakdown has sold 1,005,000 copies in the US.

Walmart refused to carry the album, as it contains a Parental Advisory sticker, and requested that Green Day release a censored edition. The band members did not wish to change any lyrics on the album and responded by stating, "There's nothing dirty about our record ... They want artists to censor their records in order to be carried in there. We just said no. We've never done it before. You feel like you're in 1953 or something."

In 2009, the band met with award-winning director Michael Mayer, along with many cast and crew members of the Tony Award-winning musical Spring Awakening, to create a stage version of American Idiot. The musical American Idiot opened in the Berkeley Repertory Theatre at the end of 2009. The show featured an expanded story of the original album, with new characters such as Will, Extraordinary Girl, and Favorite Son. On April 20, 2010, American Idiot opened on Broadway, and Green Day released the soundtrack to the musical, featuring a new song titled "When It's Time". In June 2010, it was released as a single on iTunes.

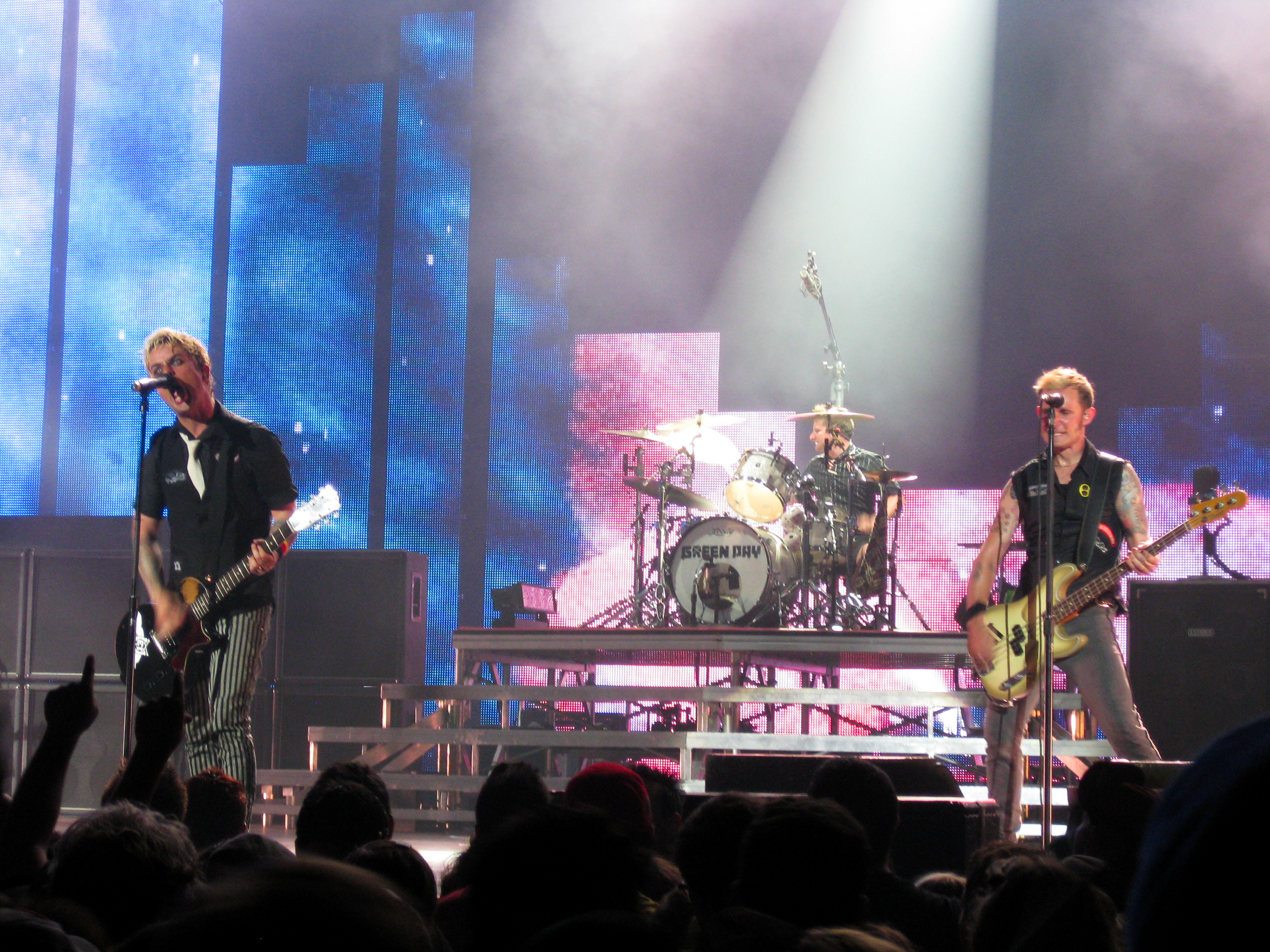
Green Day performing in New Jersey in 2010

During the Spike TV Video Game Awards 2009, it was announced that Green Day was set to have its own Rock Band video game titled Green Day: Rock Band (2010), as a follow-up to the last band-specific game, The Beatles: Rock Band (2009). The game features the full albums of Dookie, American Idiot, and 21st Century Breakdown, as well as select songs from the rest of Green Day's discography.

During the second leg of the 21st Century Breakdown World Tour, the band members stated they were writing new material. In an interview with Kerrang! magazine, Armstrong spoke about the possible new album: "We did some demos in Berlin, some in Stockholm, some just outside of Glasgow, and some in Amsterdam. We wanted get [the songs] down in some early form." The band members also stated that the group was recording a live album of the tour, featuring the previously unreleased song "Cigarettes and Valentines". In October 2010, Dirnt was interviewed by Radio W and mentioned that the group had completed the writing process of their ninth studio album. Dirnt also mentioned that a new live album would most likely be released. The live CD/DVD and CD/Blu-ray titled Awesome as Fuck was released on March 22, 2011.

=== 2011–2014: ¡Uno! ¡Dos! ¡Tré! ===
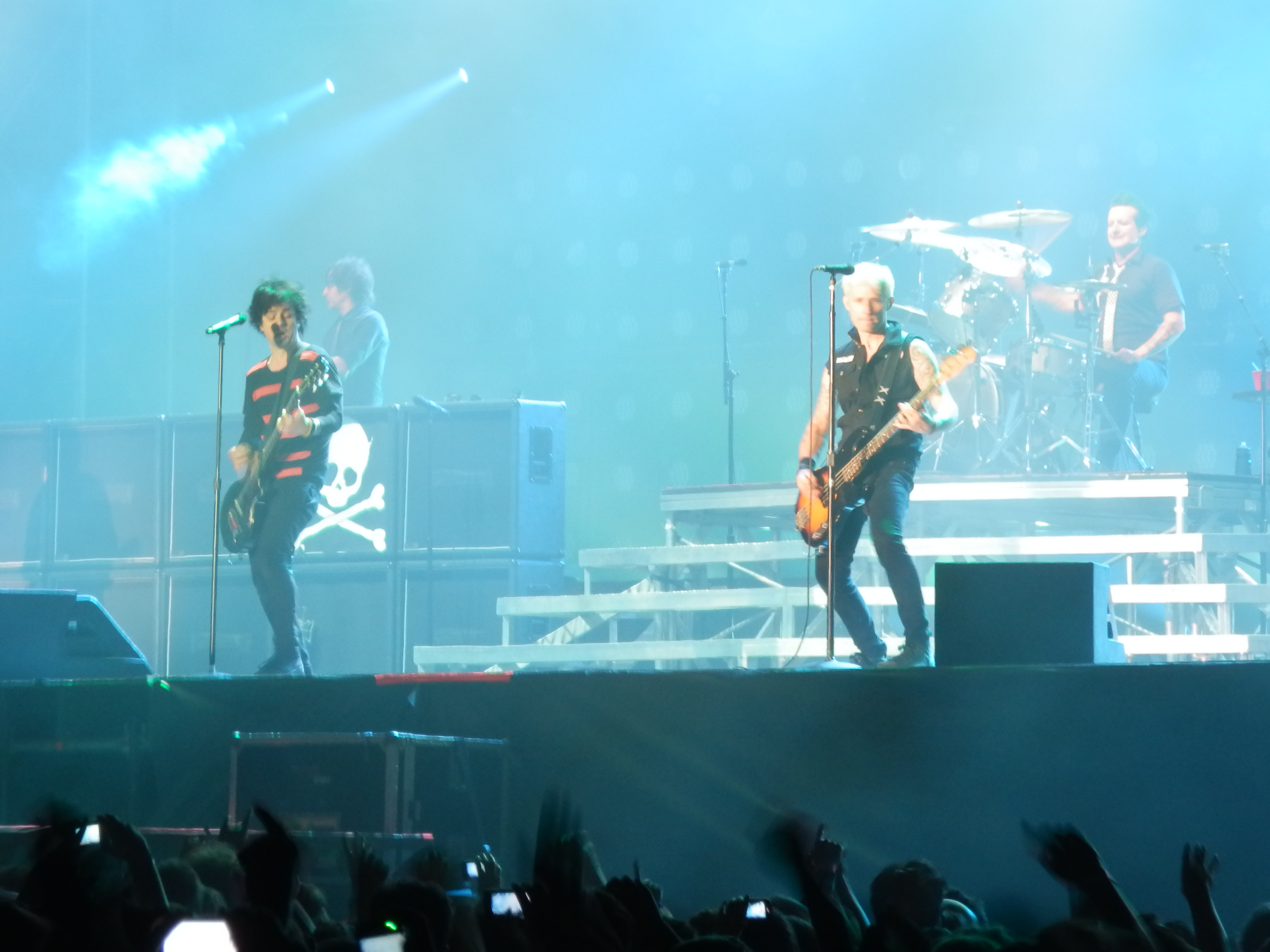
Green Day performing in 2013

During the end of 2011, the band played several secret shows (under the name Foxboro Hot Tubs) whose setlists consisted almost entirely of previously unheard songs. Green Day entered the studio and began recording new material in February 2012, later announcing a trilogy of albums titled ¡Uno!, ¡Dos!, and ¡Tré! which would be released in fall 2012. The trilogy featured longtime touring guitarist Jason White joining the band in the studio as an additional musician. This marks the first time that White had played guitar on a Green Day album. That summer, Green Day played several festivals and promotional shows, including the Rock en Seine festival in France, the Rock am See festival in Germany, and the Reading Festival in the United Kingdom.

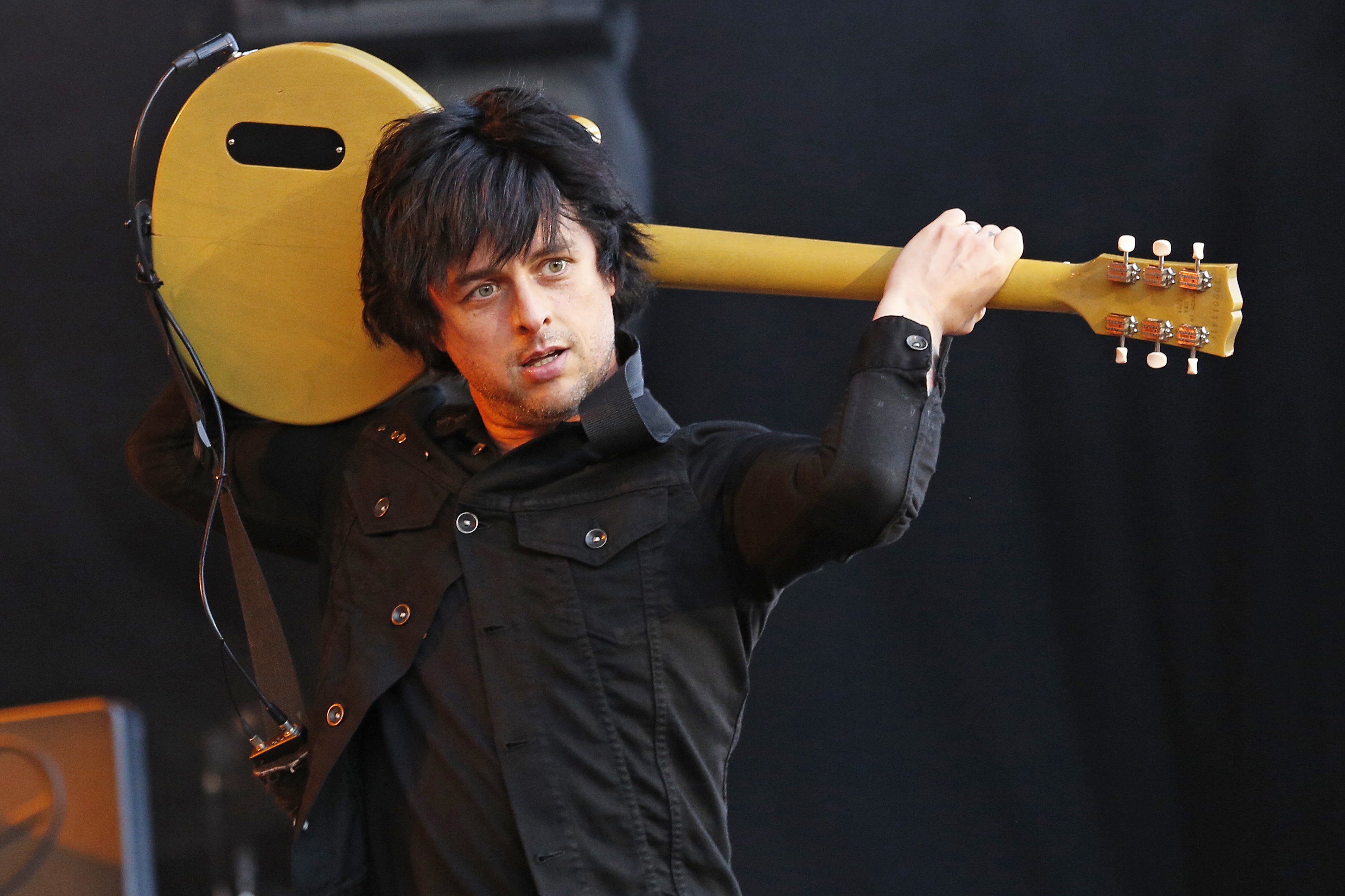
Armstrong performing with Green Day in 2013

¡Uno!, ¡Dos!, and ¡Tré! were released on September 21, November 9, and December 7, 2012, respectively, and were met with generally positive reviews from critics, though fans were more lukewarm towards the albums. On January 22, 2013, the band announced that ¡Cuatro!, a documentary about the making of ¡Uno!, ¡Dos! and ¡Tré!, would premiere on January 26 in Aspen, Colorado as part of the X Games FILM showcase, and would be released on DVD April 9, 2013. Another documentary was announced called Broadway Idiot which focuses on the creation on the American Idiot musical and Armstrong's run as playing the character of St. Jimmy. On March 10, 2013, Green Day began its 99 Revolutions Tour to support the trilogy. In June, Green Day broke Emirates Stadium attendance record with 60,000 tickets sold. The band played Dookie from start to finish on several dates on the tour's European leg, including during the Reading Festival 2013 headline show.

Demolicious, a compilation album that contains alternate versions and demos of songs from ¡Uno!, ¡Dos! and ¡Tré! recorded during the studio sessions of these albums, was released on April 19, 2014, for Record Store Day. It also contains a previously unreleased song called "State of Shock" and an acoustic version of "Stay the Night", from ¡Uno!.

=== 2014–2018: Rock and Roll Hall of Fame and Revolution Radio ===
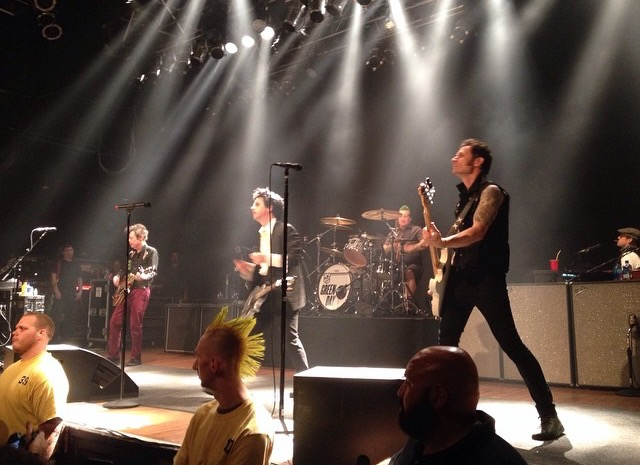
Green Day performing in Cleveland, Ohio in 2015

Green Day performed their first concert in a year on April 16, 2015. The group first played a set as Sweet Children with John Kiffmeyer, followed by a set as Green Day. On April 18, 2015, Green Day were inducted into the Rock and Roll Hall of Fame by Fall Out Boy.

On April 24, 2015, Rob Cavallo revealed Green Day were recording a twelfth studio album. Cavallo claimed to have heard "five new songs that Billie has written and demoed", and that the fans should be "sure that when they do return, the music will be amazing". On December 24, 2015, Green Day released a Christmas song, "Xmas Time of the Year".

On August 11, 2016, Green Day released the first single, "Bang Bang", from the group's twelfth studio album, Revolution Radio, which was released on October 7, 2016. The band went on a world tour supporting the album. In November 2016, the band performed at the American Music Awards in Los Angeles and made a political statement about the then-recent US election of Donald Trump by chanting "No Trump, No KKK, No Fascist USA" during their rendition of "Bang Bang".

Aaron Burgess at Alternative Press observed, "It's the first time in years Green Day haven't had all the answers. But as a statement on how it feels to fight, it's the closest to the truth they've ever gotten." Gwilym Mumford of The Guardian stated "[after their last few albums] the band have decided to get back to basics: Revolution Radio is their most focused work in years. Lead single "Bang Bang" sets the tone, with a caustic consideration of the fame-hungry psychosis of a mass shooter".

The band released their second greatest hits compilation, God's Favorite Band, on November 17, 2017. It contains 20 of their hits, along with two new tracks: a different version of the Revolution Radio track "Ordinary World", featuring country singer Miranda Lambert, and a previously unreleased song titled "Back in the USA".

=== 2019–2023: Father of All Motherfuckers ===
On April 13, 2019, for Record Store Day, the band released their Woodstock 1994 performance on vinyl for the first time. It contains all 9 songs they played live, as well as audio of the ensuing mud fight. On September 10, 2019, the band announced the Hella Mega Tour with Fall Out Boy and Weezer as headliners alongside themselves, with the Interrupters as the opening act. They also released the single, "Father of All..." off their thirteenth album, Father of All Motherfuckers. The same day, in an interview with KROQ, Armstrong announced the band would be parting ways with Reprise after the album's release, as they were off their contract with Warner. On September 30, 2019, Green Day signed a two-year agreement with the National Hockey League (NHL). The album's second single, "Fire, Ready, Aim", was released on October 9, 2019. The album's third single, "Oh Yeah!", was released on January 16, 2020. The album was released on February 7, 2020. The album's fourth single, "Meet Me on the Roof", was released on the same day as the album.

On April 6, 2020, Armstrong revealed that he had written six songs intending to record new music with the band once the COVID-19 pandemic had passed. On May 21, 2020, the band released a cover of Blondie's "Dreaming".

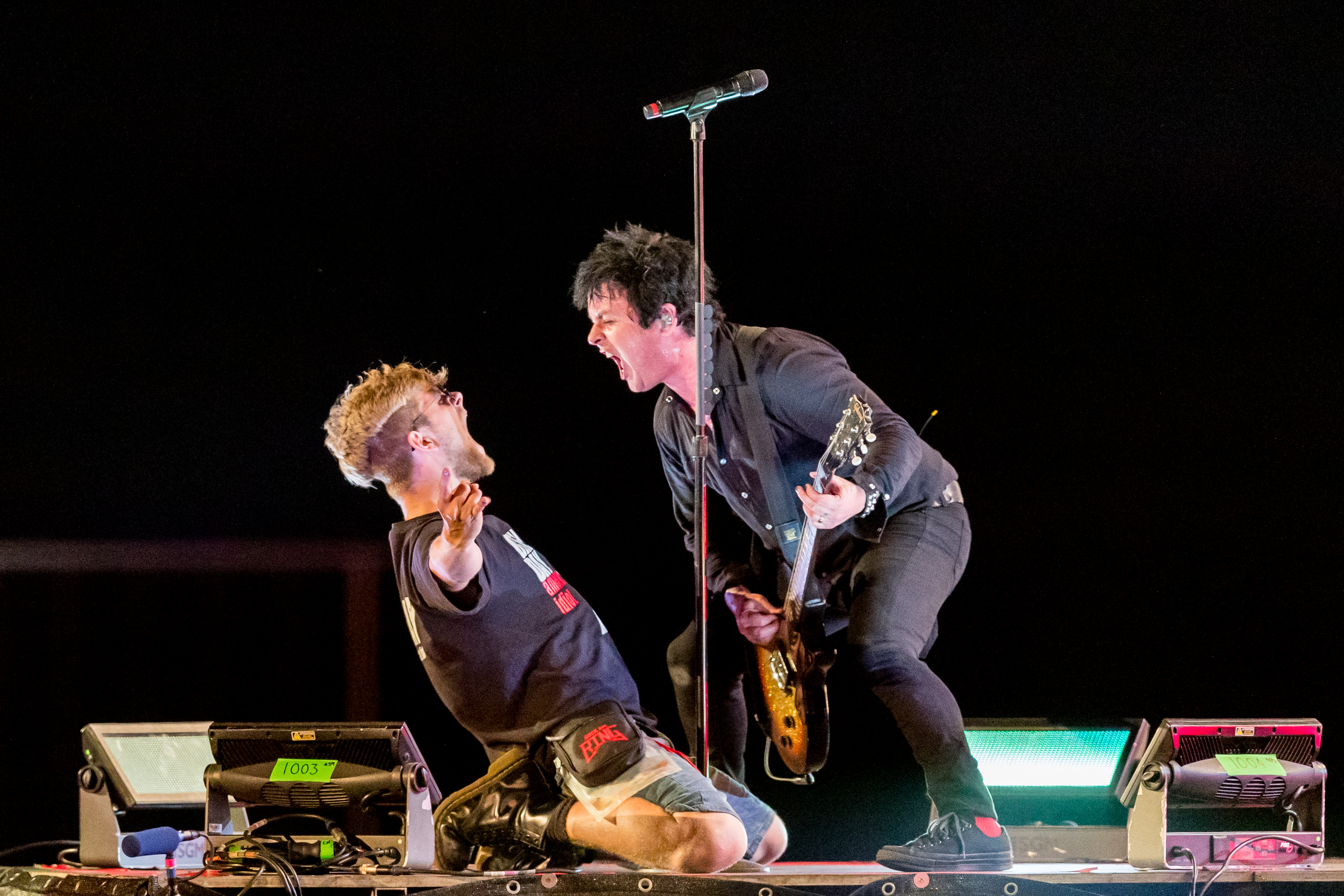
Armstrong performing with a fan on the stage at Rock am Ring in 2022

On October 30, 2020, the band's secret side project, the Network, teased upcoming activity with a video titled "The Prophecy" and mentioned their upcoming sequel album. Then on November 2, 2020, the Network released a music video for their first song in 17 years, named "Ivankkka Is a Nazi". After a couple of weeks of small hints on social media, as well as Green Day claiming they were not the Network, the band released an EP on November 20, 2020, titled Trans Am. On December 4, 2020, the Network released their second album, Money Money 2020 Part II: We Told Ya So!.

In February 2021, Green Day announced a single, titled "Here Comes the Shock", which was later released on February 21, 2021. The band would release a remastered version of Insomniac in March for the belated 25th anniversary of the album's release, with bonus live tracks. On May 17, 2021, Green Day released the single "Pollyanna". The reshuffled Hella Mega Tour would take place in the United States from July to September 2021, and the United Kingdom in June and July 2022. Between legs, on November 5, 2021, the band released the single "Holy Toledo!". This song was also in the soundtrack of the 2021 film Mark, Mary & Some Other People.

BBC Sessions, the fourth live album by Green Day, was released on December 10, 2021. Eight days later, they put out a teaser video with the captions "RAK Studios. London, England. Green Day. 1972".

In 2022, Green Day played a handful of major festivals in the United States, including Lollapalooza, and Outside Lands. The band also played a surprise Lollapalooza aftershow set at Metro Chicago on July 29, a set that was mostly improvised. The set included their first performances of "Church on Sunday", and "Warning" since 2001, and also included fan favorite deep tracks "Whatsername", "Letterbomb", and "Murder City". On October 26, 2022, Green Day was announced as a headliner for the fifth annual Innings Festival in Arizona.

=== 2023–present: Saviors ===
In November 2022, the band stated they were recording for a new studio album. The album was produced by Rob Cavallo, marking his first album working with the band since ¡Tré! (2012). Prior to the album's release, the band played a new song titled "1981" during their live performance at Festival d'été de Québec on July 16, 2023. On September 30, 2023, Green Day was announced as the halftime show at the 110th Grey Cup. The following day, the band launched a new website with the name "The American Dream Is Killing Me". Included on the website was a video appearing to tease new music, and a circled date of October 24, 2023, leading some news outlets to believe that it is related to their next album. Before the album's release, they played the first song, "The American Dream Is Killing Me", during a live show in Las Vegas, Nevada, on October 19, 2023, and announced the Saviors Tour, which first North American leg was joined by the Smashing Pumpkins, Rancid, and the Linda Lindas. They played another song, titled "Look Ma, No Brains!", from the upcoming album during the When We Were Young Festival on October 22, 2023.

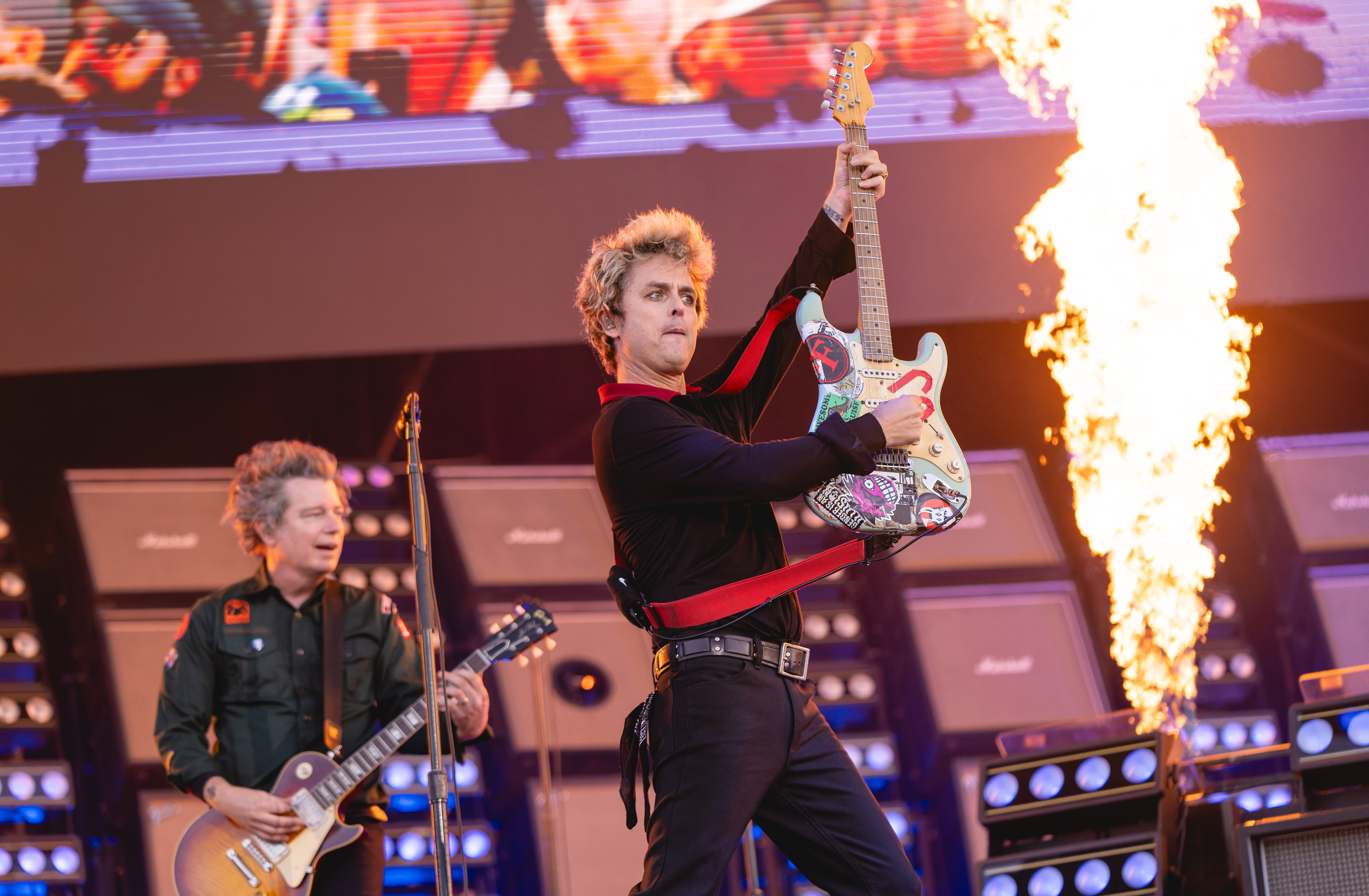
Green Day performing at the Isle of Wight Festival 2024

On October 24, 2023, the title of the new album was announced as Saviors, and the album's first single, "The American Dream Is Killing Me", was released. The album was released on January 19, 2024. The second single, "Look Ma, No Brains!", was released on November 2, 2023. A third single, "Dilemma", was announced on December 4, 2023, and released three days later on December 7, 2023. On New Year's Eve, Green Day performed "American Idiot" on the television special Dick Clark's New Year's Rockin' Eve. Armstrong replaced the line "I'm not a part of a redneck agenda" with "I'm not a part of the MAGA agenda", a reference to Donald Trump's Make America Great Again slogan, in criticism of Trump. The album's fourth single, "One Eyed Bastard", was released on January 5, 2024. On the evening of January 16, 2024, the band appeared in a surprise performance in the 47th–50th Streets–Rockefeller Center station of the New York subway system, with late-night host Jimmy Fallon joining them on tambourine to help draw attention to the upcoming album and tour, and played several songs, including the recent single "Look Ma, No Brains", "Basket Case", and "American Idiot"; this time, Armstrong left space to let the subway crowd sing out the song's revised line "I'm not a part of the MAGA agenda." The album, and a music video for "Bobby Sox", were both released simultaneously on January 19, 2024. A music video for "Corvette Summer" was released on July 23, 2024.

Green Day opened for the FireAid benefit concert on January 30, 2025; it was hosted by both Intuit Dome, and the Kia Forum. The band opened with a duet of "Last Night on Earth" with Billie Eilish, followed by "Still Breathing", and "When I Come Around". On April 9, 2025, Green Day announced the deluxe edition of Saviors, with "Smash It Like Belushi" released as the first single. The same month, the band performed as headliners in the year's Coachella Festival. "Ballyhoo" was released as the second single of Saviors deluxe on May 2, 2025. The deluxe edition, and an official music video for "One Eyed Bastard", were both released on May 23, 2025. They co-headlined Riot Fest in September 2025 Chicago along with "Weird Al" Yankovic, Blink-182, Jack White, Weezer, and Idles.

The band performed at the opening ceremony of Super Bowl LX on February 8, 2026. Consisting of an instrumental of "Good Riddance", and the band playing "Holiday", "Boulevard of Broken Dreams" and "American Idiot", the performance omitted political references. The omission received mixed reactions from fans on social media. Two days prior, they performed at a Super Bowl weekend party in San Francisco sponsored by FanDuel and Spotify, where Armstrong pleaded for Immigration Customs and Enforcement agents to "quit their shitty ass jobs" and warned that the Trump Administration would "drop you like a bad fucking habit".

== Artistry ==
=== Musical style and influences ===
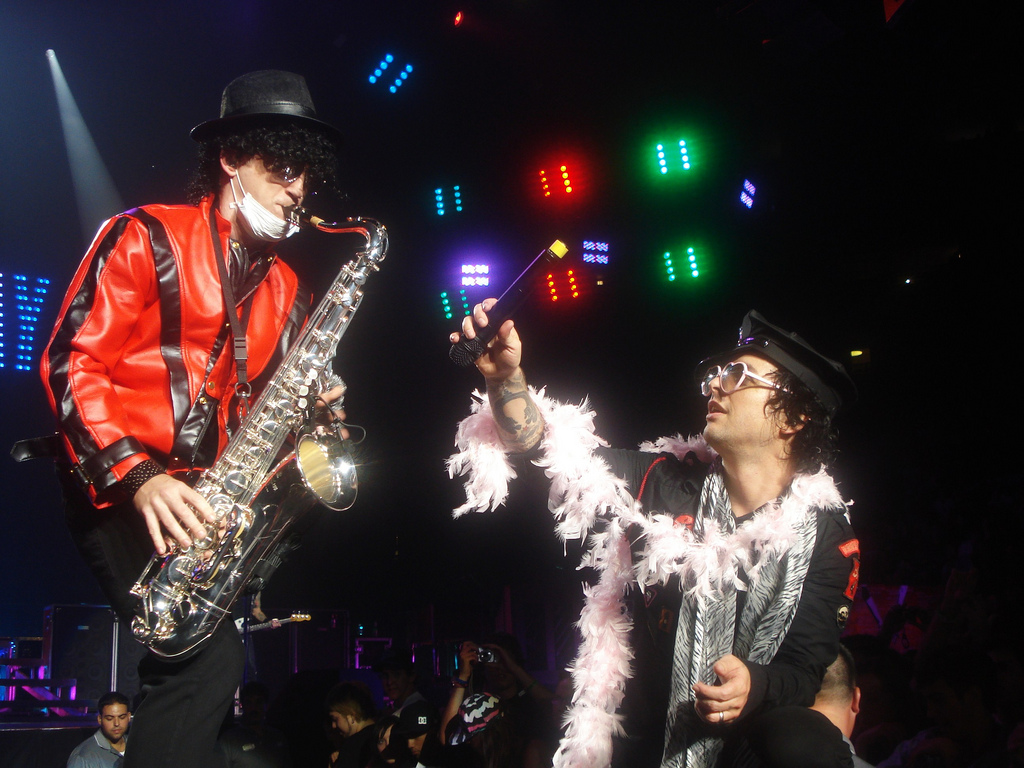
Green Day performing "King for a Day", a ska-inspired song featuring saxophones and trumpets

Green Day's sound is described as "often hard-driving and aggressive", and is often compared to first wave American and British punk rock bands such as the Ramones, Sex Pistols, the Clash, the Dickies, and Buzzcocks. The band is primarily known for its heavy use of power chords combined with "strong pop melodic sensibility". Several publications have characterized the band as punk rock, pop-punk, skate punk, melodic punk, alternative rock, and more controversially, power pop. (Note: Musical styles: "punk rock"; "pop punk"; "skate punk"; "melodic punk"; "alternative rock"; "power pop") The band has casually explored other musical styles, including post-punk and pop-rock with 21st Century Breakdown, and garage rock on ¡Dos! and Father of All... Stephen Thomas Erlewine of AllMusic described Green Day as "punk revivalists who recharged the energy of speedy, catchy three-chord punk-pop songs." Among the labels of the band by critics, members Billie Joe Armstrong and Tré Cool have stated in interviews with Livewire and Kerrang! self-describing Green Day as just a punk rock band.

Billie Joe Armstrong has mentioned that some of his biggest influences are seminal hardcore punk bands Hüsker Dü and the Replacements, and that their influence is particularly noted in the band's chord changes in songs. Green Day has covered Hüsker Dü's "Don't Want to Know If You Are Lonely" as a B-side to the "Warning" single, and the character "Mr. Whirly" in the group's song "Misery" is a reference to the Replacements song of the same name. Southern California-based hardcore bands Social Distortion and Bad Religion have also been cited as influences. Green Day would cover the former's song "Another State of Mind" from their 1983 debut release, Mommy's Little Monster as a bonus track for 21st Century Breakdown.

Outside of their punk influences, Green Day have also cited hard rock bands the Kinks, the Who, and Cheap Trick. In August 1996, Billie Joe Armstrong told Guitar World he "can remember a few different instances" of when he first discovered punk rock: "There were these two guys who introduced me to things like D.O.A. and the Dead Kennedys. Then, in the seventh grade, there was a girl at school who would bring in records like T.S.O.L. and say, 'Here, listen to this.'" Armstrong said he thinks he "really started getting into" punk rock "in 1987 with Turn It Around!, a double seven-inch compilation record put out by [punk fanzine] Maximumrocknroll." Armstrong cited Turn It Around! as an influence, calling it "a pretty big record" for him. Armstrong would also cite fellow East Bay punk bands Operation Ivy, Jawbreaker, and Crimpshrine as influences. Tré Cool has stated that the band is influenced by music that they did not like, naming artists like Hall & Oates, Cyndi Lauper and other 1980s music.

Although Green Day has been compared to Buzzcocks, the Ramones and the Clash, Mike Dirnt said he had never heard Buzzcocks when Green Day began. Dirnt said: "First off, you can't sound like any of those bands. And secondly, those are probably the last ones in my record collection." Armstrong responded to Dirnt, saying: "Mine too. Those are all bands I got into later." The Dickies is another band Green Day has been compared to. Dirnt said he "never owned a Dickies album, although" he "did see" the Dickies live "around the time of" Kerplunk!. Dirnt said "by that time, we'd played so many shows it had no bearing." Armstrong referred to the Dickies as "just another Ramones rip-off". Although in August 1996, Armstrong said bands like the Ramones are bands he listened to later, in June 2010, Armstrong cited the Ramones as an influence. He also said his "range of favorite songwriters goes anywhere from the Sex Pistols to Lennon–McCartney". During the American Idiot and 21st Century Breakdown era of Green Day, the band was influenced by the Who, U2, Motown albums, and musicals such as Grease.

=== Lyrical themes ===
Green Day's lyrics explore themes including adolescence, substance abuse, heartbreak, political sociology and anti-authoritarianism. While Armstrong is the band's primary songwriter, he looks to the other band members for organizational help. The band's lyrics frequently incorporate profanity. In 2016, a study of 361 musical artists conducted by Italian music data company Musixmatch found that Green Day used profanity the most among the rock music artists included in the study, beating out Red Hot Chili Peppers and Aerosmith. The study suggested that across a selection of 136 tracks from the band's catalogue, the swear words most frequently uttered were "fuck", "fucking", and "shit", respectively.

=== Live performances ===
Billie Joe Armstrong regularly invites musicians at Green Day concerts onstage to substitute for the band members on guitar, bass and drums, often letting the guest musicians keep the instruments they used during their guest spots. Armstrong is quoted saying: "I remember being a kid and seeing Van Halen play. I was, like, 12, and Eddie would come out, and I'd go, 'God, it would be so cool to be up there and do what he's doing. So I was always keeping that in mind, subconsciously that's basically what ended up happening, breaking down the barrier between the band and the audience."

In 2016, Armstrong began altering lyrics during live performances to criticize members of the Trump Administration. He later did this to JD Vance and Elon Musk in 2025. Other live lyrical alterations include references to the Israel-Gaza War, which voiced support for Palestine.

== Legacy ==
=== Critical recognition and influence ===
Green Day is credited (alongside Bad Religion, the Offspring, NOFX, Social Distortion, and Rancid) with popularizing mainstream interest in punk rock in the United States, particularly with the album Dookie, which was cited by Fuse as the most important pop-punk album of all time, the best alternative album of 1994 by Rolling Stone, and as one of the best punk rock albums of all time by Rolling Stone, Kerrang!, Revolver, and LA Weekly. Diffuser listed Dookie as the greatest album of the 90s. It was also placed on the Rock and Roll Hall of Fame's "Definitive 200" list of 200 classic albums. Both Dookie and American Idiot appeared on Rolling Stone's list of the 500 Greatest Albums of All Time. Kerplunk was also listed in a 2007 ranking of the 100 greatest indie albums by Blender. In 2011, they were voted the best punk rock band of all time by Rolling Stone.

The band has been cited as an influence by a variety of artists, including Alkaline Trio, Avril Lavigne, AFI, Fall Out Boy, Blink-182, Car Seat Headrest, Joyce Manor, Lady Gaga, Wavves, Fidlar, Tegan and Sara, the Menzingers, New Found Glory, Prince Daddy & the Hyena, Bowling for Soup, Billie Eilish, and Sum 41.

=== Awards and achievements ===
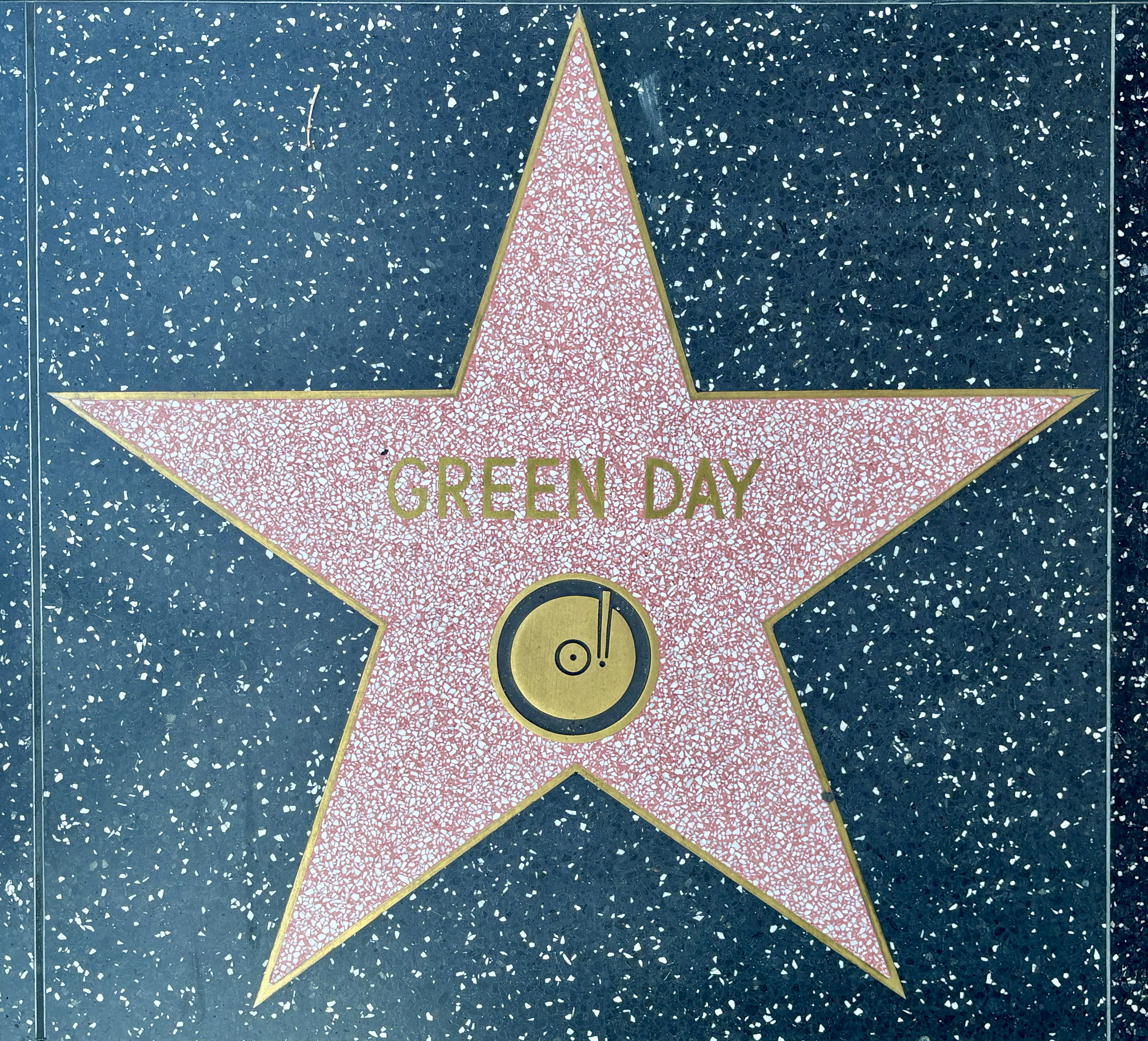
Star on the Hollywood Walk of Fame

Green Day has sold roughly 75 million records worldwide as of 2024, making them one of the highest-selling artists of all time. Kerplunk is one of the bestselling independent albums of all time, selling over 4.5 million copies worldwide. The group has been nominated for 20 Grammy awards and has won five of them with Best Alternative Album for Dookie, Best Rock Album for American Idiot and 21st Century Breakdown, Record of the Year for "Boulevard of Broken Dreams", and Best Musical Show Album for American Idiot: The Original Broadway Cast Recording.

In 2010, a stage adaptation of American Idiot debuted on Broadway. The musical was nominated for three Tony Awards. The band was inducted into the Rock and Roll Hall of Fame in April 2015, their first year of eligibility. They received a star on the Hollywood Walk of Fame on May 1, 2025.

== Related projects ==
Since 1991, members of the band have branched out past Green Day, starting other projects with various musicians. Notable projects related to Green Day include Billie Joe Armstrong's Pinhead Gunpowder with Jason White and the Longshot with Jeff Matika, the Frustrators with Mike Dirnt, and the Network, a collaboration between Green Day and friends in which all members play under fake stage names. Green Day has also released an album titled Stop Drop and Roll!!! on May 20, 2008, under the name Foxboro Hot Tubs, which the band uses to book secret shows. In late December 2011, Armstrong formed a family band called the Boo which recorded a one-off Christmas record for their friends and family making a few copies available in a local store. Since January 2018, Armstrong, Dirnt and White have played in the band the Coverups along with Green Day audio engineer Chris Dugan and tour manager Bill Schneider. The band sporadically performs one-off shows, usually in small clubs, and cover the songs of classic rock and alternative rock bands such as Cheap Trick, Tom Petty and the Heartbreakers, the Clash, and Nirvana.

In September 2006, Green Day collaborated with U2 and producer Rick Rubin to record a cover of the song "The Saints Are Coming", originally recorded by the Skids, with an accompanying video. The song was recorded to benefit Music Rising, an organization to help raise money for musicians' instruments lost during Hurricane Katrina, and to bring awareness on the eve of the one-year anniversary of the disaster. In December 2006, Green Day and NRDC opened a web site in partnership to raise awareness on America's dependency on oil.

Green Day released a cover of the John Lennon song "Working Class Hero", which was featured on the album Instant Karma: The Amnesty International Campaign to Save Darfur. The band performed the song on the season finale of American Idol. The song was nominated for a Grammy Award in 2008 but lost to the White Stripes' "Icky Thump". That summer, the band appeared in a cameo role in The Simpsons Movie, where the band performed a rock version of the show's theme song. Their version of it was released as a single on July 23, 2007.

In 2009, the band collaborated with theater director Michael Mayer to adapt the group's rock opera American Idiot into a one-act stage musical that premiered at the Berkeley Rep on September 15, 2009. The show then moved to Broadway on April 20, 2010. The reviews of American Idiot: The Musical have been positive to mixed. Charles Isherwood of The New York Times wrote an enthusiastic review for the Broadway production. He called the show "a pulsating portrait of wasted youth that invokes all the standard genre conventions ... only to transcend them through the power of its music and the artistry of its execution, the show is as invigorating and ultimately as moving as anything I've seen on Broadway this season. Or maybe for a few seasons past." Jed Gottlieb of the Boston Herald enjoyed the premise of the show but found that "the music and message suffer in a setting where the audience is politely, soberly seated".

Michael Kuchiwara of the Associated Press found the show to be "visually striking [and] musically adventurous", but noted that "the show has the barest wisp of a story and minimal character development". Paul Kolnik in USA Today enjoyed the contradiction that Green Day's "massively popular, starkly disenchanted album ... would be the feel-good musical of the season". Time magazine's Richard Zoglin opined that the score "is as pure a specimen of contemporary punk rock as Broadway has yet encountered, [yet] there's enough variety. ... Where the show falls short is as a fully developed narrative." He concluded that "American Idiot, despite its earnest huffing and puffing, remains little more than an annotated rock concert. ... Still, [it] deserves at least two cheers—for its irresistible musical energy and for opening fresh vistas for that odd couple, rock and Broadway." Peter Travers from Rolling Stone, in his review of American Idiot, wrote "Though American Idiot carries echoes of such rock musicals as Tommy, Hair, Rent and Spring Awakening, it cuts its own path to the heart. You won't know what hit you. American Idiot knows no limits—it's a global knockout." The musical has been nominated for three Tony Awards, including Best Musical and Best Scenic Design. It was also nominated for several Drama Desk Awards and Outer Critics Circle Awards.

In October 2009, a Green Day art project was exhibited at StolenSpace Gallery in London. The exhibition showed artworks created for each of the songs on 21st Century Breakdown, was supported by the band, and led by the group's manager Pat Magnarella. He explained in an interview that "[Artists are] basically like rock bands. Most are creating their art, but don't know how to promote it." For Billie Joe Armstrong, "Many of the artists ... show their work on the street, and we feel a strong connection to that type of creative expression."

On April 13, 2011, a film version of American Idiot was confirmed. Michael Mayer, director of the Broadway musical, would have directed the film. It will be produced by Green Day, Pat Magnarella (Green Day's manager who also produced Bullet in a Bible, Awesome as Fuck, and Heart Like a Hand Grenade), Playtone (Tom Hanks and Gary Goetzman) and Tom Hulce. However, in February 2020, Billie Joe Armstrong revealed to NME that plans for a film adaptation of the stage musical had been "pretty much scrapped", without providing anymore details as to the reason.

On January 23, 2013, it was announced that a documentary showing Armstrong's journey from punk rock to Broadway was to be released. Called Broadway Idiot and showing a lot of behind-the-scenes of the American Idiot musical production, the movie was directed by Doug Hamilton, veteran television journalist for CBS News' 60 Minutes and PBS documentaries such as Nova, Frontline and American Masters. A trailer was released on January 30, 2013. The documentary premiered at the South by Southwest Film Festival on March 15, 2013.

Green Day served as executive producers of Turn It Around: The Story of East Bay Punk (2017), an extensive documentary film about the San Francisco Bay area punk scene from the late 1970s to the 1990s.

=== Nimrods ===
On February 10, 2025, Live Nation Productions announced a comedy film titled New Years Rev, which was described as a "coming-of-age tale", inspired by the true exploits of the band prior to their mainstream breakthrough in 1994. Production of the film was said to be underway in the US state of Oklahoma. Lee Kirk was announced as the film's writer and director. Live Nation Productions, the film and TV arm of Live Nation Entertainment, was said to be producing the film. Armstrong, Dirnt and Cool were announced as producers, in addition to making an appearance in the film themselves. Ryan Kroft, Michael Rapino, Jonathan Daniel were announced as the film's executive producers. Mason Thames, Kylr Coffman and Ryan Foust were announced as the film's stars. Kirk's wife Jenna Fischer was confirmed to have a role in the film. Angela Kinsey, Fischer's The Office co-star, was also confirmed to have a role in the film.

The film's logline read, "Their roadtrip is a rowdy and mischievous jaunt across the country filled with adventures, based on the exploits of Green Day and their years of living in a tour van." According to Kroft, the film "[tells] the story of three friends as they travel across the United States after mistakenly thinking they'll be opening for a Green Day New Years concert in Los Angeles." Kirk had previously worked with Armstrong on Ordinary World (2016), which Armstrong starred in.

The film premiered at the Toronto International Film Festival on September 12, 2025. In April 2026, it was announced that the film was acquired by Inaugural Entertainment and retitled Nimrods.

A brand new song exclusive to the soundtrack of this film, titled "I'm Never Gonna R.I.P.", was released on July 7, 2026, along with a music video.

== Controversies ==
=== Musical style and classification ===
Green Day has generated controversy over whether their musical style and major-label status constitutes "true punk". In reaction to both the style of music and the background of the band, John Lydon, former frontman of the 1970s punk band the Sex Pistols commented, "So there we are fending off all that and it pisses me off that years later a wank outfit like Green Day hop in and nick all that and attach it to themselves. They didn't earn their wings to do that and if they were true punk they wouldn't look anything like they do." However, others in the punk rock scene would come to the defense of the band on their punk status. Bad Religion lead guitarist and founder of the independent punk label Epitaph Records, Brett Gurewitz, would state, "[Green Day] are a punk band, but you know, punk is the legacy of rock and roll, and Green Day are the biggest band in the genre."

Armstrong has discussed the group's status of being a punk band on a major record label, saying, "Sometimes I think we've become redundant because we're this big band now; we've made a lot of money—we're not punk rock anymore. But then I think about it and just say, 'You can take us out of a punk rock environment, but you can't take the punk rock out of us.'" In 2021, Armstrong condemned the band's labeling as "pop-punk" by critics in a Vulture magazine interview, stating, "I never really liked that term (pop punk), it turned into sort of a genre. I never thought of myself as a pop artist. I've always been left of center. To say you're a pop-punker ... it never sat well with me." Armstrong acknowledged the band's more melodic punk style compared to other bands from the Bay Area scene it emerged from, but also brought up the band's performance alongside East Bay hardcore bands like Neurosis, Engage, Spitboy, Blatz, and Filth.

=== 2012 iHeartRadio Festival incident ===
On September 21, 2012, while Green Day was performing at the iHeartRadio music festival, Armstrong stopped while performing "Basket Case", because he believed the group's time was being shortened, possibly to extend R&B artist Usher's performance. Angered, Armstrong began ranting while a screen in the rear of the audience was labeled "1 Minutes [Left]", saying "You're gonna give me one fucking minute? You've gotta be fucking kidding me!" He also told the crowd he "was not Justin Bieber" and labeled the festival as a "joke". When the screen went blank, Armstrong smashed his guitar, while bassist Mike Dirnt smashed his bass. Armstrong then gave the finger, and declared that Green Day would be back before throwing his microphone down and walking off the stage. Two days later, the band's representative apologized for the incident on the group's behalf stating that "Green Day would like everyone to know that their set was not cut short by Clear Channel and to apologize to those they offended at the iHeartRadio Festival in Las Vegas", also adding that Armstrong would be headed to rehab, for abuse of alcohol and prescription pills. However, Dirnt would later say in an interview with Rolling Stone that he agreed with what Armstrong meant by his rant. The band later made amends with the company and played an album release party for their 2016 release, Revolution Radio. They also returned to the festival in 2019 supporting the album Father of All Motherfuckers.

=== Mad Cool incident ===
On July 7, 2017, about 20 minutes before Green Day headlined Mad Cool, a festival in Madrid, an acrobat fell about 30 metres (98 ft) from a cage above the stage and died. Some fans were upset at the band and festival organizers for continuing the show, which was attended by about 35,000 people. On their website, Armstrong said the band did not know about the accident before their set, and likely would not have played if they had.

=== Oracle Park incident ===
On September 20, 2024, Green Day performed a show in San Francisco at Oracle Park. During the concert, Billie Joe Armstrong expressed his anger over the Athletics leaving Oakland, repeatedly cursing Las Vegas and called it "the worst shithole in America". He also criticized A's owner John Fisher, saying "We don't take shit from people like fucking John Fisher … I hate Las Vegas." In protest of Armstrong's comments, two Las Vegas radio stations (KOMP 92.3 and X107.5) banned all Green Day music from their playlists.

=== Elon Musk incidents ===
In January 2025, while on tour in South Africa, Green Day once again adapted the lyrics of their song "American Idiot" to criticize Elon Musk. At their Calabash Festival headliner performance at Johannesburg's FNB Stadium on January 19, lead singer Billie Joe Armstrong altered the line "I'm not a part of a redneck agenda" to "I'm not a part of the Elon agenda."

Musk, who had previously mocked Green Day on X (formerly Twitter) in early 2024, calling their commentary "milquetoastedly raging for it", had branded the band as hypocritical in their anti‑"machine" rhetoric. In response, bassist Mike Dirnt told Rolling Stone: "Elon Musk actually is the machine... He's not shy about saying stupid shit on the internet... The song's twenty years old, and we're Green Day. What did you expect?"

== Band members ==
Current

- Billie Joe Armstrong – lead vocals, guitar (1987–present); harmonica (1997–present); piano (2008–2012)
- Mike Dirnt – bass (1988–present); backing and occasional lead vocals (1987–present); guitar (1987–1988)
- Tré Cool – drums, percussion, occasional backing and lead vocals and guitar (1990–present)

Current touring

- Jason White – guitar, backing vocals (1999–present, session member 2012–2016)
- Jason Freese – keyboards, accordion, saxophone, trombone, backing vocals, occasional acoustic guitar (2004–present; hiatus in 2024; session member from 2003–2004, 2008–2009)
- Kevin Preston – guitar, backing vocals (2019–present)

Former

- Raj Punjabi – drums, percussion, backing vocals (1987–1988)
- Sean Hughes – bass (1987–1988)
- John Kiffmeyer – drums, percussion, backing vocals (1988–Summer 1990; one-off guest appearance in 2015)

Former touring

- Garth Schultz – trombone, trumpet (1997–1999)
- Kurt Lohmiller – trumpet, percussion, backing vocals (1999–2005)
- Gabrial McNair – trombone, saxophone (1999–2001; session member in 1997)
- Mike Pelino – guitar, backing vocals (2004, 2005)
- Ronnie Blake – trumpet, percussion, backing vocals (2005; session member from 2015–2016)
- Bobby Schneck – guitar, backing vocals (2004–2005)
- Jeff Matika – guitar, backing vocals (2009–2019)
- Coley O'Toole – keyboards, backing vocals (2024; substitute for Jason Freese)

== Discography ==
Studio albums

- 39/Smooth (1990)
- Kerplunk (1991)
- Dookie (1994)
- Insomniac (1995)
- Nimrod (1997)
- Warning (2000)
- American Idiot (2004)
- 21st Century Breakdown (2009)
- ¡Uno! (2012)
- ¡Dos! (2012)
- ¡Tré! (2012)
- Revolution Radio (2016)
- Father of All Motherfuckers (2020)
- Saviors (2024)

== Tours ==
- 39/Smooth Tour (1990–1991)
- European Tour '91 (1991)
- Kerplunk Tour (1991–1993)
- Dookie Tour (1994)
- Insomniac Tour (1995–1996)
- Nimrod Tour (1997–1998)
- Life Without Warning Tour (1999–2000)
- Pop Disaster Tour (with Blink-182) (2002)
- American Idiot World Tour (2004–2005)
- 21st Century Breakdown World Tour (2009–2010)
- 99 Revolutions Tour (2013)
- Revolution Radio Tour (2016–2017)
- Hella Mega Tour (with Fall Out Boy and Weezer) (2021–2022)
- The Saviors Tour (2024–2025)

== See also ==
- Green Day: Rock Band
- List of best-selling albums in the United States
