= ¡Dos! =

Studio album by Green Day
- Released: November 9, 2012
- Recorded: February 14 – June 26, 2012
- Studio: Jingletown Recording, Oakland, California
- Genre: Garage rock; punk rock; pop-punk
- Length: 39:21
- Label: Reprise
- Producer: Rob Cavallo; Green Day

Green Day chronology
¡Uno! (2012)	¡Dos! (2012)	¡Tré! (2012)

Singles from ¡Dos!
- 1. "Stray Heart" Released: October 15, 2012

¡Dos! (stylized in all caps) is the tenth studio album by the American rock band Green Day. The album was released on November 9, 2012, in Australia, November 12 in the United Kingdom and on November 13 in the United States through Reprise Records. It is the second installment in the ¡Uno! ¡Dos! ¡Tré! trilogy. Following its predecessor's power pop style, ¡Dos! was billed as Green Day's take on garage rock.

The album accumulated the highest average reviews of all three trilogy albums, receiving generally positive reviews from music critics, who praised its dynamic style and catchy songs; others found its music dull and observed filler on the album. It debuted at number nine on the US Billboard 200, with first-week sales of 69,000 copies in the United States, a low for the band, becoming their first album since Nimrod (1997) not to sell 100,000 records in its first week.

== Theme and composition ==
In an interview with frontman Billie Joe Armstrong, and bassist Mike Dirnt, it was stated that ¡Dos! was going to be "more garage rock—a little dirtier, like you're in the middle of the party" feel to it, similar to their side project Foxboro Hot Tubs. In a couple of interviews, Armstrong even went as far as calling ¡Dos! "the second Foxboro album." The track "Fuck Time", originally performed as a Foxboro Hot Tubs song, was recorded for the album, as was the track "Stray Heart".

Unlike the other two albums in the trilogy, this album features thirteen tracks instead of twelve. The final track "Amy" is dedicated to the late Amy Winehouse. The song "Nightlife" features guest vocals from Lady Cobra of the band Mystic Knights of the Cobra. The song is one of the slower and darker songs from the trilogy and has Lady Cobra rapping in her respective parts of the track. The album's tenth track, titled "Lady Cobra" is inspired by her. A black-and-white cutout of her with a sailor hat is seen on the back cover with her eye crossed out with a pink "X".

== Release and promotion ==
A trailer for the album was released on June 21, 2012, on the band's YouTube channel, it included a preview of the song "Fuck Time". A preview of the song "Lazy Bones" was featured in a special Green Day themed level pack of Angry Birds Friends. Green Day also released previews of the songs "Stray Heart", "Makeout Party", "Wild One", "Fuck Time", "Lady Cobra" and "Nightlife" during an interview on BBC Radio 1. A very short preview of the song "See You Tonight" was featured in one of their tour videos. On October 3, 2012, Green Day officially announced the track list for the album on their website. The songs "Stop When the Red Lights Flash", "Amy" and "Nightlife" were featured on the episode "Unspoken" of CSI: NY alongside "Kill the DJ" from ¡Uno! and "The Forgotten" from ¡Tré!, narrating the first dialogue-free 30 minutes of the episode. An official trailer was released on October 15 and featured previews of "Stop When the Red Lights Flash", "Fuck Time", and "Stray Heart". "Stop When the Red Lights Flash" is featured in the 2012 Electronic Arts racing game, Need For Speed: Most Wanted, and is included on the game's soundtrack album.

The album was officially released to listen by Green Day on the Rolling Stone website on November 6. Vinyl copies of ¡Dos! feature "Drama Queen" (from ¡Tré!) instead of "Stray Heart" due to the fact that they were pressed before the two tracks were swapped. A clean version of the track "Fuck Time" was released under the name "F-Woo Time".

=== Artwork ===
The band uploaded a trailer for the album on their official channel on YouTube showing the band in the recording studio as well as performing the song "Fuck Time" with their garage rock side band, Foxboro Hot Tubs. During the trailer the cover artwork for the album was revealed. It features a black-and-white cutout of bassist Mike Dirnt, with his eyes crossed-out with pink X's, on a geometric, orange background. The words "Green Day" are loudly splashed in blue across the top of the cover, while the word "¡Dos!" is sprawled graffiti-style in white in the lower left-hand corner, much like the artwork for their previous album ¡Uno!

=== Singles ===
"Stray Heart" premiered on Idiot Club, Green Day's official fan club, on October 8, 2012, and premiered on Zane Lowe's BBC Radio 1 show on the same day. It was later confirmed to be released as a single for the album on October 15, 2012, in the UK, and October 23, 2012, in the US. On October 18, 2012, it was announced on Idiot Club that fans could go to downtown Los Angeles, to appear in the music video for "Stray Heart" on October 19, 2012. The video was released on November 7, 2012. The song reached number 10 on the Japan Billboard Japan Hot 100 in October. It was the only single to be released from the album.

== Critical reception ==
Professional ratings
Aggregate scores
Source	Rating
Metacritic	68/100
Review scores
Source	Rating
AllMusic	4/5 stars
The A.V. Club	C−
Entertainment Weekly	B+
Los Angeles Times	3.5/4 stars
Mojo	4/5 stars
NME	6/10
The Observer	2/5 stars
Rolling Stone	3.5/5 stars
Slant Magazine	3/5 stars
Spin	6/10

At Metacritic, which assigns a normalized rating out of 100 to reviews from mainstream critics, ¡Dos! received an average score of 68, based on 24 reviews, which indicates "generally favorable reviews". AllMusic editor Stephen Thomas Erlewine complimented its "high-octane" style and called it a "terrific little party record". Randall Roberts of the Los Angeles Times commended Green Day for "allowing in a much wider range of sounds and styles", and found the album "way more impressive than the rudimentary math of Uno!", calling it "an excellent Green Day album — one of its best — a catchy, revealing work". Jon Dolan of Rolling Stone wrote that Green Day "harness[es] the sound of immolating, teenage-wasteland lust for an album with a distinct sense of life coming off the rails". Scott Heisel of the Alternative Press felt that, apart from "Fuck Time" and "Nightlife", the album is "so focused and straightforward", and commented that despite some "rote" lyrics, Green Day "function[s] at their best with hook-filled songs that are typically three minutes or less." Despite noting a few "outright missteps", AJ Ramirez of PopMatters found the album generally "engaging" and dubbed it "the best Green Day studio album since American Idiot—given the uneven nature of the LPs in between, that's praise that demands qualifiers." Kerrang! complimented the album's "variety" and observed a "musical joie de vivre" throughout.

By contrast, Jason Heller of The A.V. Club perceived a lack of "joy" in the band's "garage-rock angle", writing that they "feel like they're writing a paper on the genre rather than celebrating it in song". Phil Mongredien of The Observer called the album "oddly leaden and largely witless", and criticized the band for "flailing ever further from the pop nous that has underscored their finest moments". Barry Nicolson of NME found ¡Dos! "too cluttered with filler to measure up against the best of the band's stuff". Slant Magazine's Jonathan Keefe wrote similarly, "only a handful of its tracks are truly essential additions to the Green Day catalogue." Mark Roche of State felt that it "has as many disappointing tracks as it does impressive ones" and observed from Green Day "the attempt to forge modern expectations with old school sensibility, even if it doesn't always work." Sputnikmusic's Joseph Viney felt that "Armstrong's lyrics are the biggest hindrance" and called the songs musically "limp". Jon Young of Spin felt that Armstrong "might want to abandon" his "juvenile posturing ... even the most seductive rascals lose their boyish allure eventually." Kyle Anderson from Entertainment Weekly stated "scratches the party-till-you-puke surface and there's plenty of minor-key darkness lurking below, as in the bleary-eyed 'Lazy Bones' and the lounge- lizard groove propping up 'Nightlife'."

== Commercial performance ==
The album debuted at number nine on the Billboard 200, with first-week sales of 69,000 copies in the United States. The album has sold over 175,000 copies in the US. The album also debuted at number 10 in the UK with first-week sales of 24,613 and total sales of 91,870 as of October 13, 2016. ¡Dos! became the band's first album since their 1994 release Dookie that did not sell 100,000 copies in its first week.

== Track listing ==
All lyrics are written by Billie Joe Armstrong, except "Nightlife", written by Armstrong and Monica Painter; all music is composed by Green Day (Armstrong, Mike Dirnt, Tré Cool).

No.	Title	Length
1.	"See You Tonight"	1:06
2.	"Fuck Time"	2:45
3.	"Stop When the Red Lights Flash"	2:26
4.	"Lazy Bones"	3:34
5.	"Wild One"	4:19
6.	"Makeout Party"	3:14
7.	"Stray Heart"	3:44
8.	"Ashley"	2:50
9.	"Baby Eyes"	2:22
10.	"Lady Cobra"	2:05
11.	"Nightlife" (featuring Lady Cobra)	3:04
12.	"Wow! That's Loud"	4:27
13.	"Amy"	3:25
Total length:		39:21

Japan CD bonus track
No.	Title	Length
14.	"Coming Clean" (Live at Irving Plaza in New York City, NY; September 15th, 2012)	1:39

Notes

- "Fuck Time" is censored as "F**k Time".
- On the vinyl pressing, "Drama Queen" from ¡Tré! appears in place of "Stray Heart". Due to it being printed before the tracks were switched between albums, "Stray Heart" never saw a true vinyl release, with "Drama Queen" appearing on both ¡Dos! and ¡Tré!.

== Personnel ==
Personnel taken from ¡Dos! CD booklet.

Green Day

- Billie Joe Armstrong – vocals, guitar
- Mike Dirnt – bass, vocals
- Tré Cool – drums, percussion

Additional musicians

- Jason White (Note: Despite being credited as a member of Green Day in the liner notes, Jason White has confirmed that he was never an official member of the band.) – guitar
- Monica Painter (Lady Cobra) – additional vocals on "Nightlife"

Technical personnel

- Rob Cavallo – producer
- Green Day – producer
- Chris Dugan – engineer
- Chris Lord-Alge – mixing
- Brad Kobylczak – second engineer
- Lee Bothwick – additional engineer
- Keith Armstrong – mixing assistant
- Nik Karpen – mixing assistant
- Brad Townsend – additional mixing assistant
- Andrew Schubert – additional mixing assistant
- Ted Jensen – mastering
- Andrew "Hans" Buscher – guitar technician
- Eden Galindo – bass technician
- Kenny Butler – drum technician
- Mike Fasano – drum technician
- Jaime Neely – production assistant
- Michelle Rogel – production assistant

Artwork

- Chris Bilheimer – art direction, design
- Mike Dirnt – cover photo
- Felisha Tolentino – band photo
- Monica Painter (Lady Cobra) – back cover photo

== Charts ==
=== Weekly charts ===
Weekly chart performance for ¡Dos!
Chart (2012)	Peak position
Austrian Albums Chart	3
Australian Albums Chart	10
Belgian Albums Chart (Flanders)	11
Belgian Albums Chart (Wallonia)	26
Canadian Albums Chart	12
Croatian Albums Chart	3
Czech Republic Albums Chart	8
Danish Albums Chart	20
Dutch Albums Chart	13
Finnish Albums Chart	18
French Albums Chart	24
Germany Albums Chart	4
Hungarian Albums Chart	3
Irish Albums Chart	11
Italian Albums Chart	4
Japanese Albums Chart	8
Mexican Albums Chart	16
New Zealand Albums Chart	5
Norwegian Albums Chart	6
Polish Albums Chart	41
Portuguese Albums Chart	27
Scottish Albums Chart	8
South Korean Albums Chart	3
Spanish Albums Chart	16
Swedish Albums Chart	10
Swiss Albums Chart	8
Taiwanese Albums Chart	9
UK Albums Chart	10
UK Rock Albums Chart	1
US Billboard 200	9
US Billboard Rock Albums	3
US Billboard Alternative Albums	3
US Billboard Digital Albums	9
US Billboard Tastemaker Albums	3

=== Year-end charts ===
Chart (2012)	Position
Hungarian Albums Chart	39

Chart (2013)	Position
US Billboard 200	175
US Top Rock Albums (Billboard)	46

== Certifications and sales ==
Certifications and sales for ¡Dos!
Region	Certification	Certified units/sales
United Kingdom (BPI)	Gold	100,000^{‡}
^{‡} Sales+streaming figures based on certification alone.

== Release history ==
Country	Date	Format
Australia	November 9, 2012	CD, digital download
United Kingdom	November 12, 2012	CD, digital download, LP
United States	November 13, 2012	CD, digital download, LP
