= Kick Over the Traces =

Compilation album by Pinhead Gunpowder
- Released: June 16, 2009
- Recorded: 1991–2008
- Genre: Punk rock
- Length: 41:55 (Disc 1) 43:48 (Disc 2)
- Label: Recess
- Producers: Kevin Army, Billie Joe Armstrong, Willie Samuels, Chris Dugan

Pinhead Gunpowder chronology
West Side Highway (2008)	Kick Over the Traces (2009)	Unt (2024)

Kick Over the Traces is a compilation album by the American punk rock band Pinhead Gunpowder. The album contains tracks from Pinhead Gunpowder releases since the band formed in 1990. The album was released through Recess Records on June 16, 2009. The Japanese edition features a second disc recorded live at 924 Gilman Street on February 10, 2008, and features different cover art.

== Track listing ==
=== Disc 1 ===
No.	Title	Writer(s)	Originally appeared on	Length
1.	"West Side Highway"	Aaron Cometbus	Pinhead Gunpowder (2008 EP)	2:08
2.	"Losers of the Year"	Cometbus	Jump Salty	2:23
3.	"Reach for the Bottle"	Cometbus	Carry the Banner	1:28
4.	"Find My Place"	Cometbus	Carry the Banner	1:07
5.	"Kathleen"	Cometbus	Shoot the Moon	1:25
6.	"Keeping Warm in the Night Time"	Cometbus	Jump Salty	1:48
7.	"Cabot Gal"	Jason White	Shoot the Moon	1:46
8.	"I Used To"	Cometbus	Carry the Banner	1:16
9.	"Before the Accident"	Cometbus	Carry the Banner	1:47
10.	"MPLS Song"	Cometbus	Jump Salty	2:20
11.	"At Your Funeral"	Cometbus	Compulsive Disclosure	1:52
12.	"Anniversary Song"	Wilhelm Fink	Pinhead Gunpowder (2008 EP)	1:59
13.	"2nd St."	White, Colin Brooks	Compulsive Disclosure	2:09
14.	"Life During Wartime"	Cometbus	Goodbye Ellston Avenue	1:49
15.	"Landlords" (Electric Version)	Cometbus	8 Chords, 328 Words	2:10
16.	"Big Yellow Taxi"	Joni Mitchell	Jump Salty	1:57
17.	"Future Daydream"	Cometbus	Jump Salty	1:29
18.	"New Blood"	Fink	Compulsive Disclosure	1:32
19.	"Beastly Bit"	Cometbus	Jump Salty	2:20
20.	"Swan Song"	Cometbus	Goodbye Ellston Avenue	1:40
21.	"Train Station"	Cometbus	Goodbye Ellston Avenue	1:29
22.	"Mahogany"	Michael Masser, Gerry Goffin	Carry the Banner	2:00
23.	"On the Ave."	Cometbus	Pinhead Gunpowder (2008 EP)	2:45

=== Disc 2 ===
All songs written Aaron Cometbus except where noted.

1. "Find My Place" - 1:06
2. "Cabot Gal" (Jason White) - 1:46
3. "I Used To" - 1:11
4. "New Blood" (Wilhelm Fink) - 1:29
5. "Buffalo" - 2:06
6. "Reach for the Bottle" - 1:50
7. "Backyard Flames" (Bill Schneider) - 2:10
8. "West Side Highway" - 2:31
9. "Losers of the Year" - 2:43
10. "On the Ave." - 2:51
11. "Kathleen" - 1:39
12. "Landlords" - 2:12
13. "Life During Wartime" - 1:55
14. "Anniversary Song" (Wilhelm Fink) - 1:45
15. "Before the Accident" - 1:42
16. "My Boot in Your Face Is What Keeps Me Alive" - 1:24
17. "Asheville" - 1:51
18. "MPLS Song" - 2:05
19. "Swan Song" - 1:49
20. "Beastly Bit" - 2:01
21. "Train Station" - 1:25
22. "Future Daydream" - 2:15
23. "Mahogany" (Michael Masser, Gerry Goffin) - 2:16

== Personnel ==
Disc one

- Aaron Cometbus – drums
- Bill Schneider – bass
- Billie Joe Armstrong – guitar, producer
- Sarah Kirsch - guitar on Tracks 2, 6, 10, 16, 17, 19
- Jason White – guitar
- Kevin Army – producer
- Pinhead Gunpowder - producer

Disc two

- Aaron Cometbus – drums
- Bill Schneider – bass, backing vocals
- Billie Joe Armstrong – guitar, vocals
- Jason White – guitar, vocals
