= Pinhead Gunpowder (2000 EP) =

EP by Pinhead Gunpowder
- Released: June 6, 2000
- Recorded: October, 1999 at The Catbox
- Genre: Punk rock
- Length: 6:26
- Label: THD
- Producer: Willie Samuels

Pinhead Gunpowder chronology
Dillinger Four / Pinhead Gunpowder (2000)	Pinhead Gunpowder (2000)	8 Chords, 328 Words (2000)

Pinhead Gunpowder is the fifth EP by the American punk rock band Pinhead Gunpowder. It was released on June 6, 2000, through THD Records. The EP features the same cover as the band's second compilation album Compulsive Disclosure (2003), all of the songs on the EP are also featured on that album.

== Track listing ==
All music written by Pinhead Gunpowder.

Side A
No.	Title	Lyrics	Length
1.	"Buffalo"	Aaron Cometbus	1:51
2.	"Crazyhorse"	Cometbus	1:44

Side B
No.	Title	Lyrics	Length
3.	"New Blood"	Wilhelm Fink	1:32
4.	"Letter from an Old Friend"	no credit	1:21

== Personnel ==
Personnel taken from Pinhead Gunpowder liner notes.

Pinhead Gunpowder

- Billie Joe Armstrong – guitar, vocals
- Bill Schneider – bass
- Jason White – guitar, vocals
- Aaron Cometbus – drums

Additional personnel

- Willie Samuels – recording
- Aaron Cometbus – artwork
