= Fahizah =

EP by Pinhead Gunpowder
- Released: 1992
- Recorded: April 1992
- Studio: Dancing Dog Studios in Emeryville, California
- Genre: Punk rock
- Length: 7:28
- Label: Lookout! (LK 58); 1-2-3-4 Go! (GO-80)
- Producer: Kevin Army

Pinhead Gunpowder chronology
Tründle and Spring (1991)	Fahizah (1992)	Jump Salty (1994)

Fahizah is the second EP by the American punk rock band Pinhead Gunpowder. It was released in 1992 through Lookout! Records, their first release for the label.

== Track listing ==
All lyrics are written by Aaron Cometbus, except where noted; all music is composed by Pinhead Gunpowder, except where noted.

Side A
No.	Title	Lead vocals	Length
1.	"Future Daydream"	Kirsch, Armstrong	1:37
2.	"Freedom Is..."	Kirsch	2:00

Side B
No.	Title	Lead vocals	Length
3.	"Hey Now"	Kirsch	1:55
4.	"Big Yellow Taxi" (Joni Mitchell cover)	Armstrong	1:55
Total length:			7:28

== Personnel ==
- Aaron Cometbus – drums, vocals
- Billie Joe Armstrong – guitar, vocals
- Sarah Kirsch – guitar, vocals
- Bill Schneider – bass, vocals

Production

- Kevin Army - production
- Aaron Cometbus - cover art, graphic design
