= Bobby Joe Ebola and the Children MacNuggits =

American hip hop group

Bobby Joe Ebola and the Children MacNuggits.
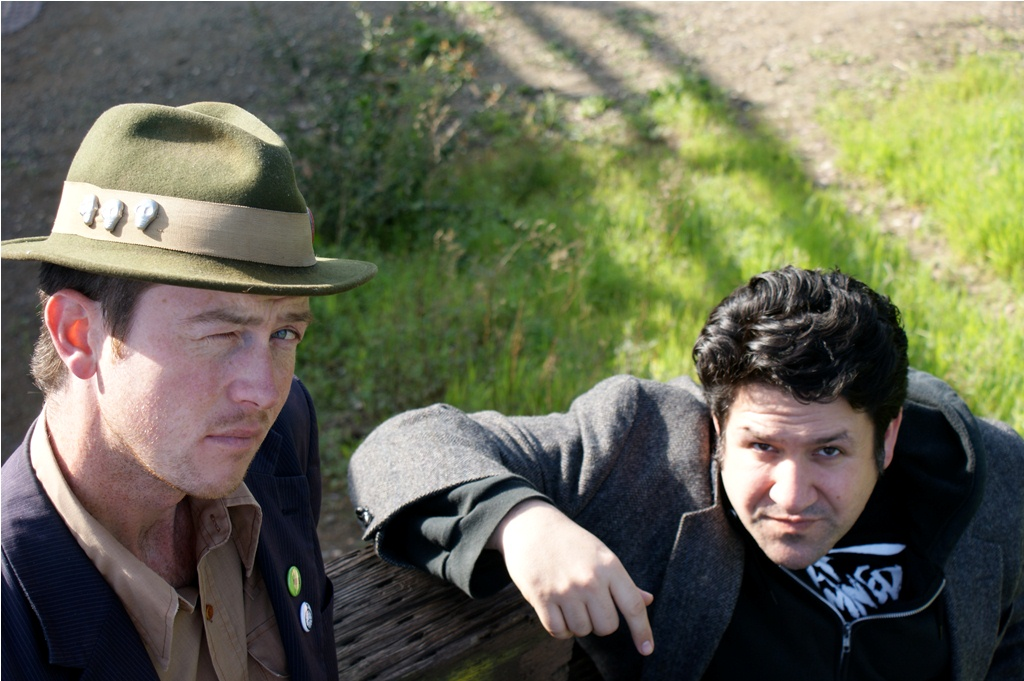
- Dan Abbott and Corbett Redford III in March of 2010.

Background information
- Also known as: Bobby Joe Ebola
- Origin: Pinole, California, United States
- Genres: Comedy; folk rock
- Years active: 1995–2000, 2009–present
- Labels: Rooftop Comedy, Suckerpunch, S.P.A.M., Dirt Cult, Thrillhouse
- Members: Corbett Redford III; Dan Abbott; Sean McTiernan; Joshua Wharton; Craig Billmeier
- Past members: John Geek; Brett Bibeau; Robert Eggplant; Yvan Kawecki
- Website: bobbyjoeebola.com

Bobby Joe Ebola and the Children MacNuggits is an American rock band duo.

Formed in 1995, the band consists of vocalist Corbett Redford III and guitarist/vocalist Dan Abbott. The duo is often joined onstage and in the studio by other musicians and participants for stage performances and recordings. Early performances featured occasional backup vocals from John Geek, who also sings for Fleshies. Abbott, Redford, and Geek were founding members of the indie label S.P.A.M. Records and organizers of Geekfest.

Between 1995 and 2000, the band toured the U.S. several times and released two full-length albums, one extended play (EP), and a split 7-inch record with the band Your Mother before disbanding in 2000. In 2009, the band reunited and recorded an album called F, and an EP, Freaky Baby, on the independent label, Silver Sprocket

== History ==
=== Origins ===
Bobby Joe Ebola and the Children MacNuggits was first formed in 1995, after Corbett Redford lied that he had a band, in order to impress a girl. The girl called his bluff and told him his band could perform at her birthday party. Redford then called Abbott, whom he had met when they were both attending Pinole Valley High School, and asked him if he would like to start a band and Abbott agreed.

The band's name came from a conversation between Abbott and Redford in the Pinole Burger King parking lot, minutes before their first show. The name "Bobby Joe" is a reference to the character from the movie Evil Dead II named Bobby Joe, portrayed by actress Kassie DePaiva.

=== Geekfest and S.P.A.M. Records ===
The band self-released its debut EP, Two Cats Running, in 1996, taking influence for DIY music production from the East Bay punk scene. Two Cats was the first release on the label founded by Abbott, Redford, Geek, and others, S.P.A.M. Records ("Smarmy Post-Angst Musicians"). The second S.P.A.M. Records release was a compilation entitled "If You Can't Laugh at Yourself, We'll Do It for You", featuring Bobby Joe Ebola and several other bands from West Contra Costa County.

S.P.A.M. ("Smarmy Post Angst Musicians") Records was an underground collective of East Bay artists and musicians that began in the year 1996 with the release of Bobby Joe Ebola and the Children MacNuggits' "Two Cats Running EP" and a CD compilation of local bands entitled "If You Can't Laugh at Yourself We'll Do It For You". Abbott, Redford and Geek were the label's founding members, and both Redford and Geek served as head coordinators for the organization. Bobby Joe Ebola was its flagship band, and the label primarily produced music projects from S.P.A.M. members and the loose-knit Geekfest community.

The band attempted to perform at 924 Gilman in nearby Berkeley, California, at that point the only all-ages venue in the East Bay. The band found it impossible to get a show at 924 Gilman or to secure advertising in Maximumrocknroll.

Because of this, the band and their friends organized their own show, which was a free, all-ages festival at a shoreline park at Point Molate Beach Park. The festival was the first of a series of events called Geekfest. Due to a scarcity of all-ages venues in the San Francisco Bay Area, and the East Bay punk scene's identity crisis in the wake of mainstream commercial success by several formerly underground acts like Green Day and Rancid, the band found itself without places to play shows. Copying the tactics of the local underground rave scene, the first Geekfest events were held illegally at Point Molate Beach Park in Richmond, CA, part of a neglected Navy fuel depot beneath the Richmond-San Rafael Bridge.

Shows were booked and announced via a voicemail at (510) BAD-SMUT on a first-come, first-served basis, regardless of genre, notoriety, or headliners. This gave Geekfest its reputation for unpredictable entertainment, with undisclosed schedules keeping attendees unaware of when any act would perform. As Geekfest became a semi-regular event with a culture all its own, its effects were felt on both Bobby Joe Ebola and on S.P.A.M. Records. The band, as the events coordinators, promoters, and hosts, networked and collaborated with touring bands and other show organizers, and nearly all S.P.A.M. releases were from veterans of Geekfest.

In August 1998, the first Geekfest campout was held at Lake Lodoga, near central California's East Park Reservoir. Sometime later that year the S.P.A.M. collective met the Pyrate Punx, another group of show promoters, artists and musicians, who were primarily based out of the San Francisco Mission District's thriving punk scene. Recognizing shared values, if not always aesthetic ones, the two groups co-organized the second Geekfest campout, billed as Pyrates vs Geeks. In subsequent years, it became known as Libertatia, an event that is still organized annually by the Pyrate Punx community.

In 1997, the band released "Advice For Young Lovers", a split 7-inch record with Geekfest alumni Your Mother, and the 18-track "At One with the Dumb" CD (S.P.A.M.).

Both S.P.A.M. Records and Geekfest were initially organized out of Hermosa Street House in Pinole, CA, where several S.P.A.M. members had spent their youth. The local blighted suburban surroundings and low-wage service-industry employment served as fodder for many of Bobby Joe Ebola's early songs.

At around this time, the City of Richmond took notice of Geekfest and demanded that the events be covered by liability insurance which the collective members could not afford. Faced with an unsympathetic local press, and increasing opportunities for shows elsewhere, the S.P.A.M. collective moved to Oakland in 1998, renting out warehouse space at the Punx with Presses warehouse.

=== Initial breakup and hiatus ===
In 2000, Bobby Joe Ebola recorded and released the album - Carmelita Sings: Visions of a Rock Apocalypse (S.P.A.M.), a 26-track album that was as electric as it was confrontational. The album, engineered by Mauricio Acevedo in Richmond, CA, was the band's first digitally recorded endeavor and featured songs recorded both as the traditional two-piece duo and with their full band ensemble. During this time, the band could sense that an implosion was near. Dan and Corbett were poor from studio and touring costs, exhausted, and struggling to run Geekfest and S.P.A.M. Records. The band had stopped being fun for them, and Bobby Joe Ebola and the Children MacNuggits called it quits.

After the breakup of the band, Corbett remained as the head coordinator of S.P.A.M. Records, vowing to show what he felt to be the real side of Bay Area alternative music. Many cult favorite Bay Area bands would get their start on S.P.A.M. Records, notably Hunx & His Punx frontman Hunx's previous electropop band Gravy Train!!!!, the high energy garage rock band Rock n Roll Adventure Kids, manic thrash punk band Tommy Lasorda and "Junkyard Rock" twee band The Blast Rocks!!!. In 2002, S.P.A.M. released a re-issue of San Francisco punk band Hickey (band)'s Various States of Disrepair CD. Corbett maintained S.P.A.M. Records until its demise, when both the label and Geekfest ceased to exist. Dan started work on a rock opera, Day of the Zombie. He also collaborated with former Bob Weirdos bandmate and present That Damned Band! frontman Dylan McPuke in the all monster jug band, Thee HoboGobbelins.

Though broken up, Dan and Corbett remained friends, and on more than one occasion (mostly at friends' request or for benefit shows) they would re-unite for one-off shows. Dan and Corbett also starred together in the independent film, Neptune, directed by filmmaker Anthony Marchitiello, alongside former back-up vocalist John Geek. In 2006, Corbett started a punk rock band called the Neverending Party, which released a split 7-inch on Thrillhouse Records with The Reaction as well as a self-titled 7-inch single on Freedom School Records.

=== Reunion ===
In 2009, Abbott and Redford began developing a pilot for an animated version of their unreleased rock opera, A Sausage Named Clarence. As they were working on the script, they were asked to play a reunion show for the Mystic Knights of the Cobra. Soon after, they decided to reunite as a band. Plans quickly developed for the band to tour and record when Bobby Joe Ebola was approached by Silver Sprocket Bicycle Club to release a record on their label. The band agreed to a non-exclusive arrangement.

The group then recorded their first digital EP, Freaky Baby, for release on Silver Sprocket as a four-song teaser to their upcoming full-length album, F. Freaky Baby was the first rap song recorded by the band and became the subject of the band's first-ever music video. The group started playing numerous shows around the Bay Area as their original two piece lineup. During these shows, the band started to showcase a large batch of new songs they had been written. These songs were eventually recorded and released on "F", their first full-length album in over a decade.

Tinged with psychedelic rock, dark folk, and twee elements, F was heralded a bold, more mature direction for the group. The songs retained the group's trademark wit, but the tone and content of the songs was noticeably darker and almost melancholic. The band embarked on four-month-long tours and five two-week local & regional tours of the United States in support of F, doing one tour featuring a full band lineup. One of the regional tours in particular saw Bobby Joe Ebola playing with Mike Dirnt of Green Day's reunited side-project band, The Frustrators. The band also traveled to play a show in London, England in support of the album.

== Music videos ==
For their first music video, the band chose the single from the EP of the same name, Freaky Baby. The video featured dancing by the acclaimed bicycle dance troupe, The Bay Area Derailleurs.

The band enjoyed creating the video, so they soon announced they would be filming one music video for each of the thirteen songs on their F LP, with plans for a DVD version of the album to be released. As of September 2012, the band has released 11 videos for songs on F on their YouTube channel. The range of production values and styles for the videos vary widely. The band has worked with several different directors including Jamie DeWolf, Christopher Poeschl, Janelle Hessig, Melissa Dale, Alex Koll and others to create music videos that involve short horror films, fake infomercials, Claymation, cartoon animation and more. The band has worked with each director to develop elaborate plots, costuming, stories and themes. The videos have featured the work and participation of hundreds of cast, crew members and directors. The band crowd sourced to raise funds to create one of the videos, Life Is Excellent.

An animated music video was created by artist Mike Foxall of XRAY Studios for the band's song Bone Dagger and was released on July 4, 2012.

== Musical style and influences ==
Bobby Joe Ebola is known for its social commentary, employing satirical lyrics touching on controversial subjects, and performances that combine elements of punk rock and comedy. The duo employs complex harmonies and aggressive rhythms influenced by folk, pop-punk, and rock'n'roll. The band cites as influences comedians Lenny Bruce and George Carlin as well as musical satirist Tom Lehrer and art-rock band They Might Be Giants.

Bobby Joe Ebola has described their band's sound as "pretty songs about awful things". Musically, they often deviate from their signature "satiric folk rock" sound to incorporate other styles, among them ska, punk rock, polka, dark folk, classic rock, and even hip hop. The band has stated that their tendency to jump musical genres has to do with involving satire in their songs as well as letting the song's sound arrive organically – if the lyrics "ask" the band to play the song in a certain style, the band abides. Abbott and Redford often sing in harmony and alternate lead vocal duties. When playing live, the group often mixes social commentary and comedy in between songs.

The band cites The Hope Bombs, a self-proclaimed "geeky" punk rock band featuring future S.P.A.M. alumni and Bobby Joe Ebola studio musician Ben Morss and former Bobby Joe Ebola bassist Robert Eggplant from Blatz (band), as a musical inspiration. The group is also influenced by Frank Zappa as well as multiple punk bands from the Bay Area's early 1990s punk-rock boom.

== Personnel ==
Principal members:

- Dan Abbott – guitar, main vocals
- Corbett Redford III – main vocals
- Sean "Night Moves" McTiernan – bass guitar
- Joshua "Gyptron" Wharton – drums
- Craig Billmeier – guitar, vocals

Live performance and studio guests:

- Ben Morss – keyboards, piano
- Finky Binks – rap vocals
- Mike Cooper – harmonica
- Dylan Blackthorn – accordion, vocals
- Michelle Hill – vocals
- Clark Meremeyer – sitar
- Mike Delcollo – MOOG
- Shawn Mehrens – vocals
- Melissa Avignon-Redford – flute, vocals
- Elizabeth Davis – cello
- Joe McKinney – ukulele
- Devin Macias – melodica
- Sean Lee – washboard, banjo, vocals
- Skyler Fell – accordion, vocals
- Zachary Glanz – saxophone
- Tony "Coyote" Perez – saxophone
- Emily Davis – violin
- Andrew Wilke – trumpet
- Mikey Porter – guitar
- Crystal Matthews – trombone
- Rushad Eggleston – cello
- Brian Bishop – string orchestration
- Rick Silvestri – guitar
- Additional group vocals – Jesse Luscious, Eliza Strack, Mark Bressem, Lady Cobra, Baby Cobra,Chino Cobra, Mickie Rat, Beckett Warren, Summer Davis, Dalton Davis, Eoin Quinn and Ami Lawless

Past members:

- John Geek – vocals
- Jon Carling – bass
- Brett Bibeau – drums
- Aaron Nichols – bass
- Yvan Kawecki (also known as Vonny Bon Bons of punk-rock band, Fleshies) – bass
- Robert Eggplant – bass
- Mike Pinkham – drums
- Kevin Woods (The El Sob House) – Guitar

== Discography ==
- The Two Cats Running – CD EP (released on S.P.A.M. Records in 1996)
- At One With the Dumb – CD LP (released on S.P.A.M. Records in 1997)
- Advice for Young Lovers – vinyl 7-inch EP (split with Your Mother, released on S.P.A.M. Records in 1998)
- ¡Carmelita Sings!: Visions of a Rock Apocalypse – CD LP (originally released on S.P.A.M. Records in 2000; reissued by Thrillhouse Records in 2007; and Silver Sprocket Bicycle Club in 2011)
- Freaky Baby – digital EP (released by Silver Sprocket Bicycle Club in 2010)
- F – CD/digital/vinyl 12-inch LP (released by Silver Sprocket Bicycle Club in 2010)
- Bone Dagger – vinyl 7-inch single (released by Suckerpunch Records in 2012)
- Trainwreck to Narnia – CD/digital/vinyl 12-inch LP (slated for December 2012 release on Rooftop Comedy (CD/Digital) and Dirt Cult Records (vinyl LP))
- Meal Deal with the Devil – CD EP with accompanying read-along storybook (early 2013 – release home not yet announced)
- The Bobby Joe Ebola Songbook with "Blues Turn Brown/The Poor flexi-disc" (early 2013 – release home not yet announced)
- Tashirojima – vinyl 7-inch single (Early 2013 – release home not yet announced, all profits will benefit JEARS (Japanese Emergency Animal Rescue and Support))
- Bad Boys Gotta Rock It! (Live Recordings from 1995 – 2013) – double cassette with digital download (out on Selfish Satan Recordings in January 2013)
- The Mr. Sausage Brand Microwave Rock Opera – double CD/LP/digital (early 2014 – release home not yet announced)

== See also ==
- List of bands from the San Francisco Bay Area
- List of Comedy bands
- List of folk rock artists
- List of hip hop musicians
- List of punk rock bands: 0–K, L–Z
- Music of California
