= 8 Chords, 328 Words =

EP by Pinhead Gunpowder
- Released: June 27, 2000
- Recorded: 2000
- Genre: Punk rock
- Length: 3:16
- Label: Lookout!
- Producer: Willie Samuels

Pinhead Gunpowder chronology
Pinhead Gunpowder (2000)	8 Chords, 328 Words (2000)	Compulsive Disclosure (2003)

8 Chords, 328 Words is the sixth EP by the American punk rock band Pinhead Gunpowder. It was released on June 27, 2000 through Lookout! Records. It is the shortest EP in the band's discography.

== Track listing ==
All music written by Pinhead Gunpowder.

Side A
No.	Title	Lyrics	Length
1.	"Landlords"	Aaron Cometbus	2:10

Side B
No.	Title	Lyrics	Length
2.	"Black Mountain Pt. 3"	Cometbus; Ed	1:06

== Personnel ==
Personnel adapted from 8 Chords, 328 Words liner notes.

Pinhead Gunpowder

- Jason White – guitar, vocals
- Billie Joe Armstrong – guitar, vocals
- Aaron Cometbus – drums
- Bill Schneider – bass

Additional personnel

- Willie Samuels – recording
- Jeanne Geiger – trombone
- Joe Savage – trumpet
- Adrienne Armstrong – cover picture
- Aaron Cometbus – artwork
