= Unt (album) =

Studio album by Pinhead Gunpowder
- Released: October 18, 2024
- Recorded: 2023
- Genres: Punk rock; pop-punk
- Length: 32:56
- Label: 1-2-3-4 Go!
- Producer: Chris Dugan

Pinhead Gunpowder chronology
Kick Over the Traces (2009)	Unt (2024)

Singles from Unt
- 1. "Unt" Released: September 5, 2024; 2. "Shine" Released: October 4, 2024

Unt is the second studio album by American punk rock band Pinhead Gunpowder. It was released on October 18, 2024 by 1-2-3-4 Go! Records. The album marks the first release from the band in 16 years. It was released on digital, vinyl, compact disc and cassette. The self-titled single for the album was released on flexi-disc.

== Background ==
Following the release of Kick Over the Traces in 2009, much of the band's activities were put on hold while the members (with the exception of drummer Aaron Cometbus) contributed to Green Day's activities. However, the band continued to meet up sporadically during this time for rehearsals and jam sessions. During the COVID-19 pandemic, Cometbus and guitarist Jason White initially passed around song ideas digitally, but ultimately felt it would be easier for the band to write and record together when it was safe.

"Rather than “writing for the new album” or rehearsing to get ready for tour, we went back to the basement every year. We lived in the house we’d built, remembering how we’d made the music for each other in the first place. We played all over the world—well, at least Oakland, Singapore and New York—but only for each other. We worked on the reissues of our back catalog, too and found ourselves fonder of each other and more family-like than ever."

— Aaron Cometbus

On September 5, 2024, the band started teasing their return through an Instagram reel, with the caption "Here comes the neighborhood...". Later that day, the band announced the album and its release date of October 18, 2024, as well as releasing the album's title track. A second single, "Shine," was also released, only on YouTube and Bandcamp.

== Release ==
On October 15, 2024, it was announced that various record shops would be hosting listening events for the new album. Colored flexi-disc versions of the title track and test pressings were both given out at these events and sold separately.

On October 18, 2024, Unt was officially released on digital, vinyl, compact disc and cassette. While the album was originally released on red vinyl, other color variations were made available in record stores across the US, UK, Japan and Australia.

Guitarist and vocalist Billie Joe Armstrong teased the possibility of a tour in an interview with magazine Kerrang!, saying “We haven’t really made any plans outside of making an album – except for some fantasies about maybe doing some touring”.

== Track listing ==
Unt track list
No.	Title	Lead vocals	Length
1.	"Unt"	Billie Joe Armstrong	3:00
2.	"Difficult but Not Impossible"	Jason White; Armstrong	2:27
3.	"Scum of the Earth"	Armstrong	1:51
4.	"Oh My"	White	2:42
5.	"Nothing Ever Happens"	Armstrong	2:09
6.	"Draw It In"	White; Armstrong	2:05
7.	"Shine"	Armstrong; White	2:00
8.	"¡Hola Canada!"	Armstrong	1:47
9.	"Here Goes the Neighborhood"	White	2:34
10.	"Mumbles"	Armstrong	2:08
11.	"Green"	White	2:47
12.	"Chowchilla"	Armstrong	1:11
13.	"Trash TV"	Armstrong	2:47
14.	"Song For Myself" (Harry Chapin cover)	Armstrong; White	3:22
Total length:			32:56

== Personnel ==
All music and lyrics by Pinhead Gunpowder.

- Jason White – guitar, vocals
- Billie Joe Armstrong – guitar, vocals
- Bill Schneider – bass guitar
- Aaron Cometbus – drums

Production

- Chris Dugan – producer
- Nick Townsend – mastering
