= Tründle and Spring =

EP by Pinhead Gunpowder
- Released: 1991
- Recorded: June 19, 1991
- Studio: Dancing Dog Studios in Emeryville, California
- Genre: Punk rock
- Length: 8:40
- Labels: No Reality (007); Take a Day (#3); 1-2-3-4 Go! (GO-78)
- Producer: Kevin Army

Pinhead Gunpowder chronology
Tründle and Spring (1991)	Fahizah (1992)

Tründle and Spring is the debut EP by the American punk rock band Pinhead Gunpowder. It was originally released in 1991 through No Reality Records. The EP was later re-released through Duotone Records and Take a Day Records.

== Track listing ==
All lyrics are written by Aaron Cometbus, except where noted; all music is composed by Pinhead Gunpowder, except where noted.

Side A
No.	Title	Lead vocals	Length
1.	"Dull"	Kirsch	2:03
2.	"Keeping Warm in the Nighttime"	Armstrong, Kirsch	1:47

Side B
No.	Title	Lead vocals	Length
3.	"MPLS Song"	Armstrong	2:20
4.	"In Control" (music by Pinhead Gunpowder and John Quittner)	Kirsch, Armstrong	2:28
Total length:			8:40

== Personnel ==
- Aaron Cometbus – drums, vocals
- Billie Joe Armstrong – guitar, vocals
- Sarah Kirsch – guitar, vocals
- Bill Schneider – bass, vocals

Production

- Kevin Army - production
- Aaron Cometbus - cover art, graphic design
- Murray Bowles - photography
