= Dillinger Four / Pinhead Gunpowder =

Dillinger Four / Pinhead Gunpowder Split

EP by Dillinger Four / Pinhead Gunpowder
- Released: May 16, 2000
- Genre: Punk rock
- Length: 8:44
- Label: Adeline
- Producer: Billie Joe Armstrong

Dillinger Four / Pinhead Gunpowder chronology
Shoot the Moon (1999)	Dillinger Four / Pinhead Gunpowder Split (2000)	Pinhead Gunpowder (2000)

Dillinger Four/Pinhead Gunpowder is a split EP by the American punk rock bands Dillinger Four and Pinhead Gunpowder. It was released on May 16, 2000 through Adeline Records.

== Track listing ==
=== Dillinger Four ===
1. "Are You the Motherfucker With the Banana?"
2. "Thanks for Nothing, Part 2: The Revenge"

=== Pinhead Gunpowder ===
All songs written by Aaron Cometbus except where noted.

1. "At Your Funeral"
2. "Porch"
3. "Second Street" (Jason White)
