= Compulsive Disclosure =

Compilation album by Pinhead Gunpowder
- Released: October 21, 2003; February 12, 2010 (reissue)
- Recorded: October, 1999 at The Catbox
- Genre: Punk rock
- Length: 14:08
- Label: Lookout!, Recess (reissue)
- Producer: Willie Samuels

Pinhead Gunpowder chronology
8 Chords, 328 Words (2000)	Compulsive Disclosure (2003)	Pinhead Gunpowder (West Side Highway) (2008)

Professional ratings
Review scores
Source	Rating
Allmusic	4/5 stars

Compulsive Disclosure is the second album by the American punk rock band Pinhead Gunpowder. It was released on October 21, 2003, through Lookout! Records. The album features songs from the group's eponymously titled 2000 EP, the Dillinger Four / Pinhead Gunpowder split EP, the 8 Chords, 328 Words EP and also features re-recorded versions of the songs "2nd Street" and "At Your Funeral" (originally from Dillinger Four / Pinhead Gunpowder). Compulsive Disclosure was re-released on CD and vinyl through Recess Records on February 12, 2010, with two unreleased tracks, "Salting Agents" and "El Lasso Grappo".

== Track listing ==
All lyrics are written by Aaron Cometbus, except where noted; all music is composed by Pinhead Gunpowder, except where noted.

Original track listing
No.	Title	Lead vocals	Length
1.	"Buffalo"	Armstrong	1:49
2.	"2nd Street" (written by Jason White and Colin Brooks)	White	2:08
3.	"Landlords" (Acoustic version; music by Pinhead Gunpowder and Ed Dimarco)	White, Armstrong	2:13
4.	"Porch Song" (music by Pinhead Gunpowder and Carey Special Brew)	Schneider	0:23
5.	"New Blood" (written by Wilhelm Fink)	Armstrong	1:32
6.	"Letter from an Old Friend"	White, Armstrong	1:20
7.	"Black Mountain Pt.3"	Armstrong, White	1:05
8.	"Crazy Horse"	Armstrong	1:43
9.	"At Your Funeral"	Armstrong, White	1:54
Total length:			14:11

Recess re-release
No.	Title	Lead vocals	Length
1.	"Buffalo"	Armstrong	1:51
2.	"2nd Street" (written by White and Brooks)	White	2:08
3.	"Landlords" (Acoustic version; music by Pinhead Gunpowder and Ed Dimarco)	White, Armstrong	2:13
4.	"Porch Song" (music by Pinhead Gunpowder and Carey Special Brew)	Schneider	0:23
5.	"Salting Agents"	White	0:43
6.	"Letter from an Old Friend"	White, Armstrong	1:21
7.	"New Blood" (written by Wilhelm Fink)	Armstrong	1:32
8.	"El Lasso Grappo" (written by Bill Schneider)	White	1:34
9.	"Black Mountain Pt.3"	Armstrong, White	1:05
10.	"Crazy Horse"	Armstrong	1:43
11.	"At Your Funeral"	Armstrong, White	1:54

- Wilhelm Fink is another name for Billie Joe Armstrong as featured singing on the track "New Blood"

== Personnel ==
- Aaron Cometbus – drums, vocals
- Billie Joe Armstrong – guitar, vocals
- Jason White – guitar, vocals
- Bill Schneider – bass, vocals

Additional performers

- Ed. Jeanne Geiger – trombone on "Black Mountain Pt.3"
- Joe Savage – trumpet on "Black Mountain Pt.3"

Production

- Willie Samuels – production
- Aaron Cometbus – graphic design, artwork
- Bill Schneider – photography
