= Jump Salty =

Compilation album by Pinhead Gunpowder
- Released: July 1994
- Recorded: June 19, 1991–March 1992
- Studio: Dancing Dog Studios in Emeryville, California
- Genre: Punk rock
- Length: 24:52
- Labels: Lookout, Recess (reissue)
- Producer: Kevin Army

Pinhead Gunpowder chronology
| Fahizah (1992) | Jump Salty (1994) | Carry the Banner (1995) |

Professional ratings
Review scores
| Source | Rating |
|---|---|
| Allmusic | 4/5 stars |

Jump Salty is a compilation album by the American punk rock band Pinhead Gunpowder. The album collects tracks from the group's first two extended plays, Tründle and Spring and Fahizah, as well as compilation appearances.

After the compilation's release, guitarist Sarah Kirsch left the band and was replaced by Jason White.

Jump Salty was re-released on CD (and for the first time on vinyl) by Recess Records on February 12, 2010. On April 30, 2021, the album was reissued again by 1-2-3-4 Go! Records

== Track listing ==
All lyrics are written by Aaron Cometbus, except where noted; all music is composed by Pinhead Gunpowder, except where noted.

| No. | Title | Lead vocals | Length |
|---|---|---|---|
| 1. | "Future Daydream" | Kirsch, Armstrong | 1:29 |
| 2. | "Freedom Is..." | Kirsch | 2:00 |
| 3. | "I Wanna" (music by Pinhead Gunpowder and John Quittner) | Kirsch | 1:50 |
| 4. | "Losers of the Year" (music by Pinhead Gunpowder and Quittner) | Armstrong | 2:43 |
| 5. | "Big Yellow Taxi" (written and originally performed by Joni Mitchell) | Armstrong | 1:59 |
| 6. | "Dull" | Kirsch | 2:04 |
| 7. | "Keeping Warm in the Nighttime" | Armstrong, Kirsch | 1:47 |
| 8. | "Beastly Bit" | Armstrong | 2:23 |
| 9. | "Benicia by the Bay" | Kirsch | 1:48 |
| 10. | "MPLS Song" | Armstrong | 2:22 |
| 11. | "In Control" (music by Pinhead Gunpowder and Quittner) | Kirsch, Armstrong | 2:28 |
| 12. | "Hey Now" | Kirsch | 1:55 |
| Total length: | | | 24:52 |

== Personnel ==
- Aaron Cometbus – drums, vocals
- Billie Joe Armstrong – guitar, vocals
- Sarah Kirsch – guitar, vocals
- Bill Schneider – bass, vocals

Production

- Kevin Army – production
- John Golden – mastering
- Aaron Cometbus – cover art, graphic design
- Bill Schneider – photography
