= Carry the Banner =

EP by Pinhead Gunpowder
- Released: December 1994
- Recorded: September 1994
- Studio: Sound and Vision Studios in San Francisco and Dancing Dog Studios in Emeryville, California
- Genre: Punk rock
- Length: 14:19
- Label: Too Many, Lookout; Recess (reissue)
- Producer: Kevin Army

Pinhead Gunpowder chronology
Jump Salty (1994)	Carry the Banner (1994)	Goodbye Ellston Avenue (1997)

Professional ratings
Review scores
Source	Rating
Allmusic	3/5 stars

Carry the Banner is the third EP by the Berkeley, California-based punk rock band Pinhead Gunpowder. Originally released on 10" vinyl in December 1994 through Too Many Records, the EP was reissued on CD by Lookout Records shortly after as the initial vinyl pressing sold out quickly. It was the group's first release to feature Jason White on guitar/vocals, replacing Sarah Kirsch, who left the band in 1994. Cometbus revealed this was due to person differences between the two and Kirsch's being busy with several other bands.

The EP was reissued in February 2010 on 12" vinyl though Recess Records. However, upon the band's request, the label cancelled the reissue and most of the copies in stock were destroyed, as were the label's other Pinhead Gunpowder vinyl reissues. The few copies sold of the reissue now go for high prices online. In August 27, 2021 the album was reissued again in 12" vinyl by 1-2-3-4 Go! Records.

== Track listing ==
All lyrics are written by Aaron Cometbus, except where noted; all music is composed by Pinhead Gunpowder, except where noted.

No.	Title	Lead vocals	Length
1.	"Find My Place"	Armstrong	1:06
2.	"Before the Accident"	White, Armstrong	1:45
3.	"I Used To" (music by Cometbus and John Quittner)	Armstrong	1:15
4.	"Reach for the Bottle"	White	1:28
5.	"Walkin' Catastrophe" (written by Jason White)	Armstrong	1:31
6.	"I Am an Elephant"	Armstrong	2:07
7.	"I Am the Stranger"	Schneider	1:31
8.	"Certain Things" (music by Cometbus and Quittner)	White, Armstrong	1:27
9.	"Mahogany" (written by Michael Masser and Gerry Goffin; originally performed by Diana Ross)	Armstrong	2:05
Total length:			14:19

== Personnel ==
- Aaron Cometbus – drums
- Billie Joe Armstrong – vocals, guitar
- Jason White – vocals, guitar
- Bill Schneider – bass, vocals

Production

- Kevin Army – producer, engineer
- John Golden – mastering
- Aaron Cometbus – cover art, graphic design
- Bill Schneider – photography
