= Pinhead Gunpowder =

American punk rock band

- Origin: East Bay, California
- Genres: Punk rock; garage punk; hardcore punk
- Years active: 1991–present
- Labels: Lookout!; Adeline; Recess; 1-2-3-4 Go!
- Spinoff of: Green Day
- Members: Billie Joe Armstrong; Bill Schneider; Jason White; Aaron Cometbus
- Past members: Sarah Kirsch; Jon Quittner

Pinhead Gunpowder is an American punk rock band that formed in the East Bay area of California, in 1991. The band currently consists of Aaron Cometbus (drums, lyrics), Bill Schneider (bass), Billie Joe Armstrong (guitar, vocals) and Jason White (guitar, vocals). The band's name comes from a brand of "high-octane" green tea served at the Arcata co-op that was discovered by Aaron Cometbus during one of his many dumpster diving adventures.

== History ==
Pinhead Gunpowder was founded in Arcata, California, in January 1991 by Aaron Cometbus and Jon Quittner. Cometbus wanted the name "Pinhead Gunpowder", while Quittner wanted to call it "50 Foot Hesher". Along with vocalist Doug "Douggie Grime" Rogers and bassist David "Atlas" Kimmel, the band played once at a party where Cometbus snapped his bass pedal in half in the middle of the set. Shortly after the show, Cometbus moved back to Berkeley, taking the name of the band and some of the songs with him. Quittner stayed in Arcata with the band and they changed their name to 50 Foot Hesher and acquired a new drummer. A few months later, Quittner left the band and the remaining members changed the name to "Lank".

Back in Berkeley, Cometbus formed the second incarnation of Pinhead Gunpowder with Bill Schneider and Sarah Kirsch of The Skinflutes, and Billie Joe Armstrong of Green Day. In June 1991, they recorded their first EP, Tründle and Spring. It was not until April of the following year that the band played their first live show at Punks With Presses in Oakland along with Rancid and The Gr'Ups. The band then released their second EP, Fahizah. In 1993, Kirsch left the band. Rumors that the reason was differences with Armstrong's decision to sign to a major label with Green Day were debunked by the band on Damian Abraham's podcast Turned Out a Punk. Kirsch was replaced by Jason White of Chino Horde. White would later also become Green Day's touring guitarist. Shortly after, the band embarked on a week long tour of Northern California, Oregon, and Washington in the winter of 1994.

Pinhead Gunpowder performed for the first time in many years during February 2008, debuting three new songs, "Anniversary Song", "West Side Highway", and "On the Ave".

The band released their latest EP, West Side Highway through Recess Records on August 19, 2008. This marked the band's first new release in 5 years.

Pinhead Gunpowder released a greatest hits album called Kick Over the Traces on June 19, 2009. Also, Pinhead Gunpowder mentioned that in August or September Recess would re-release on vinyl and CD the albums Jump Salty, Carry the Banner, Goodbye Ellston Avenue, Shoot the Moon and Compulsive Disclosure.

Band member Sarah Kirsch died in 2012. She had been diagnosed with Fanconi anemia, a genetic disorder that can cause leukemia and other cancers.

In March 2021, the band re-issued their entire discography on vinyl.

On September 5, 2024, the band returned with a new single, "Unt". A new album, also titled Unt, was released on October 18, 2024.

Pinhead Gunpowder did their first-ever tour in October and November of 2026, playing in the upper Midwest, Philadelphia, New York City, and a string of dates on the West Coast, with support from Minneapolis band Constant Insult. The West Coast dates included two extra shows in Berkeley, including a date at 924 Gilman Street which required concertgoers to purchase their tickets at the venue, in person, and to already be in possession of a 924 Gilman membership card.

== Band members ==
Current members

- Billie Joe Armstrong – guitar, vocals (1991–present)
- Aaron Cometbus – drums (1991–present)
- Bill Schneider – bass, vocals (1991–present)
- Jason White – guitar, vocals (1994–present)

Former members

- Sarah Kirsch – guitar, vocals (1991–1994; died 2012)
- Jon "Quitty" Quittner – guitar (1991)

== Songwriting ==
Aaron Cometbus is the primary writer of Pinhead Gunpowder's songs. During Pinhead Gunpowder's first incarnation, Cometbus and Quittner wrote a handful of songs together, including "In Control", "Losers of the Year", "Certain Things", "Brother", "I Used To", "Stab You in the Eye", and "Cuidado" (The last two songs released by Quittner and Cometbus under the band name "Mundt"). Cometbus often borrows songs recorded by his other bands to release as Pinhead Gunpowder songs, including "Train Station" from Shotwell Coho, "The Great Divide" from Redmond Shooting Stars, "Asheville" from Cleveland Bound Death Sentence, and "On the Ave" and "Landlords" from Astrid Oto. Only three Pinhead Gunpowder songs have been written by Billie Joe Armstrong, under the name "Wilhelm Fink": "27", "New Blood", and "Anniversary Song".

== Influences ==
The band's influences include Ramones, Joni Mitchell, the Replacements, Generation X, Swiz, Code Of Honor, Avengers, and Cheap Trick. They have also done cover versions of many of the songs by these bands or artists.

== Discography ==
=== Studio albums ===
Year	Title	Label
1997	Goodbye Ellston Avenue	Lookout/Recess/1-2-3-4 Go!
2024	Unt	1-2-3-4 Go!

=== Extended plays ===
Year	Title	Label
1991	Tründle and Spring	Take a Day/1-2-3-4 Go!
1992	Fahizah	Lookout/1-2-3-4 Go!
1994	Carry the Banner	Too Many/Lookout/Recess/1-2-3-4 Go!
1999	Shoot the Moon	Adeline/Recess/1-2-3-4 Go!
2000	Dillinger Four / Pinhead Gunpowder	Adeline
2000	Pinhead Gunpowder	THD/1-2-3-4 Go!
2000	8 Chords, 328 Words	Lookout/1-2-3-4 Go!
2008	West Side Highway	Recess/1-2-3-4 Go!
2022	At Your Funeral	GO-82/1-2-3-4 Go!

=== Compilation albums ===
Year	Title	Label
1994	Jump Salty	Recess/1-2-3-4 Go!
2003	Compulsive Disclosure	Lookout/Recess/1-2-3-4 Go!
2009	Kick Over the Traces	Recess

=== Compilation appearances ===
Year	Title	Label	Contributing track
1991	Very Small World	Very Small	"Losers of the Year"
1992	Can of Pork	Lookout	"Benicia by the Bay"
1993	Benicia	Take a Day	"Benicia by the Bay"
1993	Vinyl Retentive	Very Small	"Beastly Bit"
1994	Misfit Heartbeat	Take a Day	"I Wanna"
1996	Lookout Records	Lookout	"I Am the Stranger"
1997	Humans as Sewage	BBT Tapes	"Swan Song (live)", "Reach for the Bottle (live)", "Nigel Sings"
1997	The Last Great Thing You Did	Lookout	"Life During Wartime"
2000	Faux Pas Potpourri – Very Small Records '93–'99	Very Small	"Reach for the Bottle (live)"
2000	Might as Well... Can't Dance	Adeline	"Porch"
2001	Down in Front	No Idea	"Beastly Bit (acoustic)", "Reach for the Bottle (live)", "Swan Song (live)"
2005	Then Is the New Now	Lookout	"At Your Funeral", "Life During Wartime"
2006	Second-Hand Suit Jacket Racket	Lookout	"Letter from an Old Friend"
