= Geekfest =

Geekfest is the name of a series of free, all-ages concerts organized by California indie label S.P.A.M Records during the 1990s. The first Geekfest was held in June 1996 on the shoreline at Point Molate in Richmond, California. This site, a former Navy fuel depot at the foot of the Richmond-San Rafael Bridge, became the default location for dozens of Geekfests, though other locations were eventually used.

== Background ==
In the mid-1990s, local ordinances and economic considerations led to difficult times for San Francisco Bay Area bands whose members were under 21. Multiple bars and nightclubs were driven out by the bustling dot-com economy. Others, fearful of losing their liquor licenses, stopped allowing minors to attend or perform on their stages. By 1996, 924 Gilman Street was the only one all-ages music venue in the East Bay.

With the rise of Green Day, Rancid, and other former underground bands who had popularized the punk rock genre, Gilman had become an insular community, rejecting those who did not fit an increasingly narrow definition of punk. Though Gilman was not by design exclusively punk rock (they were and are explicitly devoted to independent music and arts), a combination of internal politics and aesthetic tastes of the Gilman staff kept other types of music off the stage. S.P.A.M. Records grew out of the efforts of underage musicians and artists from Pinole, California frustrated with the situation. The fringe Gilman band, The Hope Bombs, encouraged the S.P.A.M. crew, most notably by letting them jump on stage at Hope Bombs shows to play as "The Bob Weirdos" (whose shows consisted of crazed songs like "Help I'm On Fire" which actually involved setting singer John Geek on fire). But this support was the exception and the bands were generally deprived of any meaningful access to the Gilman audience.

S.P.A.M. Co-founder John Geek (now vocalist for punk band Fleshies) alluded to this in an interview:

"Along with Dan and Corbett of Bobby Joe Ebola and the Children MacNuggits (and joined soon by Robert Eggplant and Dylan McPuke), I started the S.P.A.M. Records Collective in 1995 because no one else would put out our shit or let us play."

Select work from the S.P.A.M. Records Catalog circa 1996-2002:

Catalog #	Band(s)	Title	Year Released	Format
PUG-001	Bobby Joe Ebola and the Children MacNuggits	The Two Cats Running EP	1996	CD
PUG-002	Various Artists	If You Can't Laugh At Yourself, We'll Do It For You - A S.P.A.M. Records Compilation	1997	CD
PUG-003	Bobby Joe Ebola and the Children MacNuggits	At One With The Dumb	1997	CD
PUG-004	Astrolloyd	Astrolloyd	1997	7"
PUG-005	Astrolloyd	Live on KXLU	1997	Cassette
PUG-006	Enemies / Second Hand Spit	Conquered/Concord Split	1998	7"
PUG-007	Your Mother / Bobby Joe Ebola and the Children MacNuggits	Advice For Young Lovers Split	1998	7"
PUG-008	The Pilgrims	Songs About the Letter W	1998	CD
PUG-009	Various Artists	Later, That Same Year... An Absolutely Zippo Compilation	1999	CD
PUG-010	Los Rabbis	The Bible Part 2: Jesus Goes West	1999	CD/LP
PUG-011	Dory Tourette and the Skirtheads	Rock Immortal	1999	CD
PUG-012	Every Dog Has His Blues	A Collection Of Songs From The Bands Of Lucky Dog	1999	Cassette
PUG-013	Harbinger	Eartraining For Corporates	1999	Cassette
PUG-014	Flobby Tthomuse	New Home Videos From Planet X	1999	CD
PUG-015	Bobby Joe Ebola and the Children MacNuggits	¡Carmelita Sings!: Visions of a Rock Apocalypse	2000	CD
PUG-016	Evolution	Spoken Word Compilation	2000	CD
PUG-017	Finky Binks	Monkey Business EP	2000	Cassette
PUG-018	Scrilla Stoic Heroic Nuggahs	The 8 Nuggah Master Race	2000	Cassette
PUG-019	Clan Of The Bleeding Eye	Kill The Humans	2000	Cassette
PUG-021	Steven Schultz	I Forgot To Get A Rap Name	2000	CD
PUG-022	Fleshies / The Jocks	Playdough Split	2000	7"
PUG-023	Stalin Claus Superstar	A Suplex Prune Hittite Fantasy	2000	4-CD Box Set
PUG-024	Uberkunst	Making Fun Difficult	2000	CD
PUG-026	Beckett and Friends	Weed Crazy b/w Losing in the Drug Game	2000	7"
PUG-027	Fleshies	Self-Titled - commonly known as "The Baby"	2000	CD
PUG-028	The Pilgrims	Plymouth Rock	2000	CD
PUG-029	The Blast Rocks!!!	You're Fired	2000	CD
PUG-030	Fleshies	Kill The Dreamer's Dream - Authorized cassette version of Alternative Tentacles release	2001	Cassette
PUG-031	Fleshies / The Phantom Limbs	Split	2001	7"
PUG-032	The Blottos	I Can't Take My Alcohol	2001	7"
PUG-033	Dory Tourette and the Skirtheads	Versions	2001	7"
PUG-034	Panty Raid / The Blast Rocks!!!	Split	2001	7"
PUG-035	Finky Binks	Charlie Buckett: Cosmonaut	2001	CD
PUG-036	Iron Ass	Backwards	2001	CD
PUG-037	Various Artists	The S.P.A.M.pler: Your Guide to the Rock Apocalypse	2001	CD
PUG-040	Finky Binks	Takin' Back My Samich	2001	CD
PUG-041	P.A.W.N.S.	Rabble On The Move	2001	CD
PUG-042	Lo Budge	Self-Titled	2002	CD
PUG-043	Tommy Lasorda	Tommy Lasorda	2002	7"
PUG-044	Hate Mail Express	12x4	2002	CD
PUG-045	Gravy Train!!!!	The "Menz" EP	2002	CD
PUG-047	Hickey	Various States of Disrepair Complete Works 1994-'96	2002	CD
PUG-050	Rock N Roll Adventure Kids	Live on Berzerkley Radio - Split release with Soul Not Style Records	2002	12"
PUG-051	Sharp Knife	Sharp Knife	2002	CD/LP
PUG-052	Shotwell	The Devil Has Its Day	2004	CD
PUG-053	Clan Of The Bleeding Eye	Self-Titled	2002	CD
PUG-054	The Blottos	The Blottos	2002	CD
PUG-068	Zero Tolerance Task Force	Z.T.T.F. Mania	2003	CD
PUG-069	Nebulus	Interactive	2003	CD
PUG-076	The Clarendon Hills	All Day All Night All Right	2003	CD
PUG-077	S.H.A.T.	Stupid Has a Target	unknown	7"

The S.P.A.M. bands, most notably Bobby Joe Ebola and the Children MacNuggits, had been rejected by the punk scene due to perceived superficial differences in dress and musical style. Label co-founder Corbett Redford, who was the singer for Bobby Joe Ebola and the Children MacNuggits, said "We were all living in Pinole and we couldn't play Gilman because they said we weren't punk. We couldn't take out an ad in MRR because they said we weren't punk. ... We were thrashfunk and silly folk I suppose." They decided, in a DIY spirit, to create their own venue, one where nobody would be rejected for having the wrong fashion sense.

The name "Geekfest" was chosen partly because the S.P.A.M. collective saw themselves as geeks; they realized their idiosyncrasies made them unpopular at parties, but made no effort to change. Their rejection by the punk scene was viewed as just another chapter in a long history of being uncool; but, as John Geek says, "Our pride in maladjustment ran too damn deep."

== First Geekfest ==
S.P.A.M. founder John Geek set up a hotline, (510) BAD-SMUT, to circulate event information. Applying the guerrilla tactics of rave culture, photocopied handbills listed the telephone number, but not the location of the event to try to prevent the show being shut down by law enforcement.

Point Molate was selected as a location, partly because it was already in use one Sunday a month for free outdoor "Sunset raves". It was far from any residential area, beneath a large bridge, and under confused jurisdiction as a Navy Superfund site.

Politically, the concept of Geekfest took an anarchist bent. It addressed issues of public land use, the role of the audience in art (since much of the time, the audience consisted of the other bands playing that day), and issues of hierarchy in a supposedly egalitarian punk scene.

Approximately 12 bands played the first show, most of who were made up of minors and bands who shared S.P.A.M.'s sense of humor and disenfranchisement. S.P.A.M. members rented a gas-powered generator, and hired a local sound engineer to work the jury-rigged P.A. The concert lasted from about 1 p.m. until sunset.

== Successive Geekfests ==
S.P.A.M. continued to organize Geekfests, usually about one per month during the summer months and occasionally during the winter, when they could find a suitable indoor location. The locations and the bands varied widely, although many bands had repeat performances, but the shows were always free and all-ages.

This concept of inclusion was central to the Geekfest concept, and extended to the booking policy. As word spread about the festivals, bands began calling to ask for shows, and sending promotional packages to the label's P.O. box. S.P.A.M. avoided listening to demo tapes they received, booking bands on a "first-come, first-served" basis. This was done to remove the bias of musical taste that S.P.A.M. blamed for their own exclusion from Gilman. As a result, the bands were often unskilled, untalented, or conversely, so polished and professional that they seemed wildly inappropriate at a no-frills, guerrilla concert. Geekfest organizers observed the conflicts that arose between different musical subcultures with a bemused detachment.

Due to the length of the concerts, which were sometimes over 8 hours, and the inconsistent quality of the acts made Geekfest less like a traditional concert and more like a carnival. Since the schedule was never listed, it was difficult for people to show up to see one band in particular. People tended to stay for most of the day and began to come as much for the playful atmosphere as for the bands.

Several Geekfest organizers, including Dan Abbott, Shawn Martin, and Dylan McPuke, were affiliated with the Amtgard live action role-playing game, bringing Amtgard to Berkeley, California. They brought homemade foam-padded swords for attendees to battle with during concerts. From then on, random foam sword battles were an integral part of Geekfest. Between bands, organizers held costume contests, raffles, and trivia games, and videogame tournaments: usually with a nod to traditionally geeky themes like Dungeons & Dragons, "Weird Al" Yankovic, or Atari games.

Gradually, Geekfest attracted a community of disparate individuals, and become something of a scene itself. Several bands made inroads into the Gilman scene, and several Geekfests were eventually held within the Gilman club itself.

Geekfest's esoteric aesthetic also became popular among organizers within the Cannabis Action Network (CAN), which allowed S.P.A.M. Records to book second-stage performances at their annual 420 festivals, including at least one at the Maritime Hall in San Francisco on April 20, 2001(video).

== Geekfest and Libertatia ==
In 1997, the Geeks (as S.P.A.M./Geekfest organizers had come to be known) decided to celebrate the first anniversary of Geekfest by having a three-day campout in Lake Ladoga, part of East Park Reservoir near Maxwell, California. It was hot, dusty, and inhospitable land under jurisdiction of the Bureau of Land Management (BLM), and the lake was a man-made body used for irrigation of nearby farms. Organizers arranged the stage so that attendees could watch the bands from the lake. The attendance was estimated at around 150 to 200 people. Drug use was rampant, mostly psychedelics, with ubiquitous drinking during the daytime. Organizers fed attendees two meals a day using kitchen equipment borrowed from Food Not Bombs: gruel in the morning and spaghetti at night.

BLM supervisor Bill Bird objected to the concert, but was overruled by the Sheriff and local merchants, who were happy for the increased business. Nearly 40 bands performed at the Geekfest Anniversary and, according to the Official Program and Event Schedule, the bands were:

- The Mac Swanky Trio
- Stark Raving Brad
- Defile
- Subincision
- Harbinger
- Visitor 42
- The Blue Sky Smokers
- Blah,Blah,Blah
- Adjective Noun
- Skitzo
- 976
- Bobby Joe Ebola and the Children MacNuggits
- Lapis Lazuli
- NME
- Impact
- Stinky Puffs
- The Keeners
- Ubzub
- Soda Pop F*ck You
- Pork and the Spork
- Magic Pinecone Band
- Shatousky
- Banana Hammock
- Hungry Hungry Hippeaux
- My Sunny Disposition
- The Enemies
- Orka Pickles
- Soundcurrent
- White Trash Debutantes
- Supernovice
- The Frught Lupes Human Ass Orkestra
- The Human Beans
- Astrolloyd
- Glamazon
- Moxie
- Erik Core
- Sixence
- Tone Def
- Suckerfish
- Wet Nap
- The Pilgrims
- Inslight Weights
- Fetish

In the intervening year, show promoter and artist, Marcus Da Anarchist, organized "Pyrate Punx Picnics" out of San Francisco's Mission District. S.P.A.M. and the Pyrate Punx collaborated on the next campout, dubbing it "Pirates vs. Geeks". John Geek and Marcus each booked half of the bands.

For the third anniversary, the Pirates and Geeks resumed an uneasy alliance, organizing a week-long Libertatia, after the anarchist pirate utopia on Madagascar founded by Captain Mission during the 18th century. It was also referred to as the "Week of Geek". As it had been before, it was free and all-ages, and organizers fed the roughly 400 attendees two meals a day. Although 100 bands were booked, only 82 attended to perform. Each day of entertainment lasted from approximately noon until 10 p.m. or 11 p.m. Several Bay Area journalists also attended, and the event received coverage in local press Subsequent Libertatia festivals were noted enthusiastically by local weeklies

The demise of S.P.A.M. Records in 2003 (closely linked to the breakup of flagship band Bobby Joe Ebola and the Children MacNuggits in 2001) spelled the end of Geekfests, though the Pyrate Punx continue to organize Libertatia annually.
