= The Longshot (band) =

American rock band

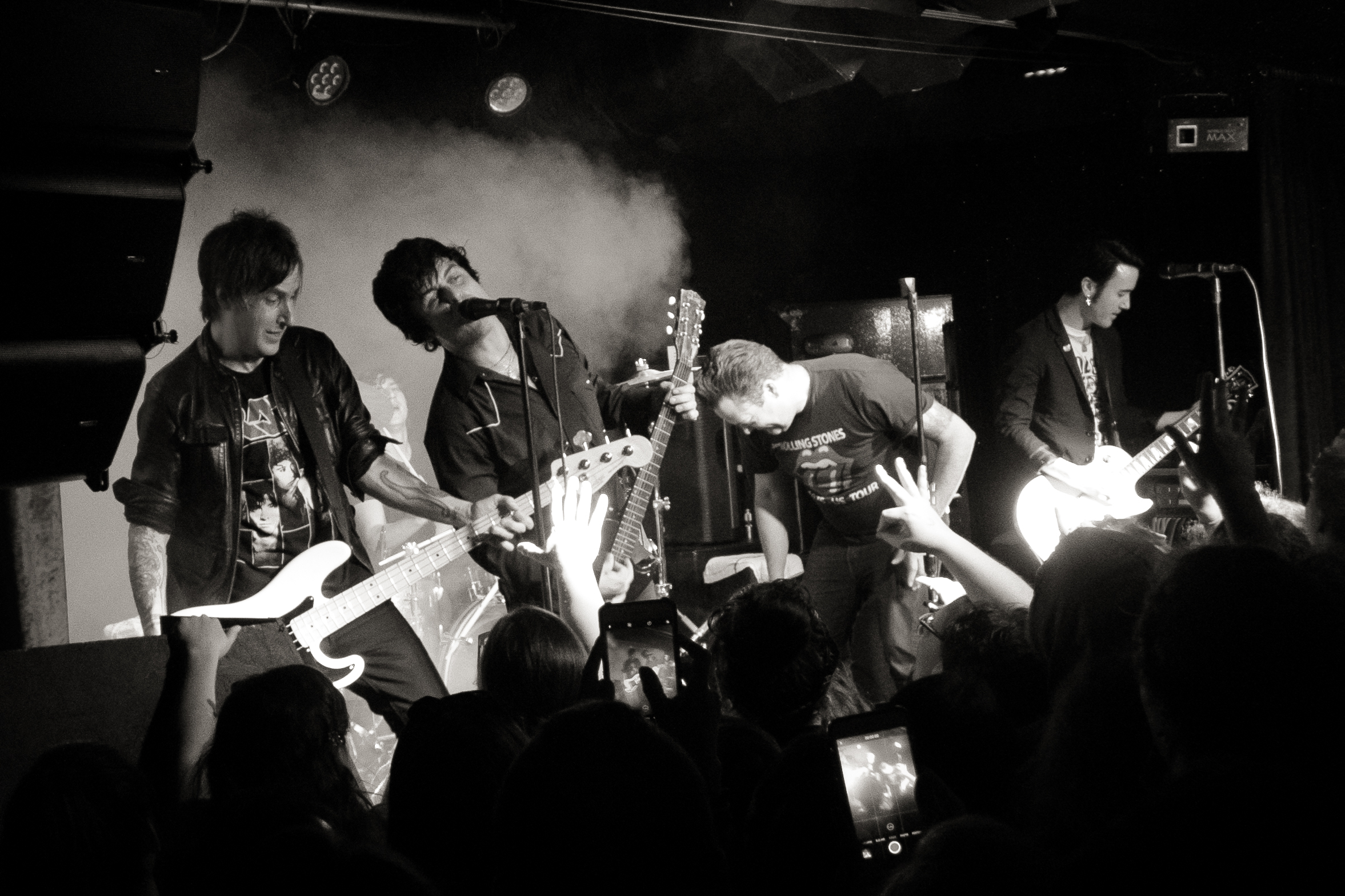
- The Longshot performing in 2018

Background information
- Origin: Oakland, California, U.S.
- Genres: Garage rock, power pop
- Years active: 2018–present
- Label: Self-released
- Spinoff of: Green Day
- Members: Billie Joe Armstrong; Jeff Matika; David S. Field; Kevin Preston

The Longshot is an American rock band formed in Oakland, California, in 2018 by Green Day frontman Billie Joe Armstrong.

== History ==
The band was formed in April 2018 by Billie Joe Armstrong following the conclusion of Green Day's Revolution Radio World Tour. Armstrong was joined by Jeff Matika, then a touring guitarist for Green Day, who elected to be the band's bassist. The group was rounded out by drummer David S. Field, and rhythm guitarist Kevin Preston, touring member for Green Day and guitarist of Prima Donna. Preston also played guitar in another Green Day side project, Foxboro Hot Tubs.

The band released their self-titled debut EP quietly on streaming services on April 12, 2018, which was followed by the announcement of their debut studio album, Love Is for Losers, releasing the following week. To support the album, the band set out on a North American tour that summer with Frankie and the Studs and the Trash Bags as support acts.

Following the formation of the band, many Green Day fans started questioning if the band had broken up. Armstrong denied these claims, and also denounced anyone that speculated that Green Day had broken up by telling them to "shut the fuck up."

The band has also released three additional EPs before and after Love Is for Losers: Return to Sender, Razor Baby, and Bullets. Armstrong also used the band to release three songs he had written for the movie Ordinary World, which he also stars in. The song "Devil's Kind" was released as a standalone single, while "Body Bag" was released on Love Is for Losers, and "Fever Blister" released on Razor Baby.

== Members ==
- Billie Joe Armstrong – lead vocals, lead guitar, production (2018–present)
- Jeff Matika – bass (2018–present)
- Kevin Preston – rhythm guitar (2018–present)
- David S. Field – drums, production (2018–present)

== Discography ==
Studio albums

- Love Is for Losers (2018)

Extended plays

- The Longshot EP (2018)
- Return to Sender (2018)
- Razor Baby (2018)
- Bullets (2018)

Singles

- "Devil's Kind" (2018)
