= Love Is for Losers =

Studio album by The Longshot
- Released: April 20, 2018
- Studio: OTIS (Oakland, California, U.S.)
- Genre: Rock and roll; power pop; garage rock
- Length: 32:32
- Label: Crush
- Producer: The Longshot

The Longshot chronology
The Longshot EP (2018)	Love Is for Losers (2018)	Razor Baby (2018)

Singles from Love Is for Losers
- 1. "Love Is for Losers" Released: April 12, 2018

Love Is for Losers is the only studio album by American rock band the Longshot. It was released on April 20, 2018, under Crush Music, an independent label.

== Critical reception ==
Professional ratings
Review scores
Source	Rating
Allmusic	4/5 stars
NME	4/5 stars
Punk News	3/5 stars
Pure Charts	5/5 stars
The Soundboard	3.5/5 stars

Love Is for Losers received positive reviews from music critics. Jordan Bassett at NME said, "This freewheeling Billie Joe Armstrong side-project finds the frontman further energised and, this time round – unlike on that ill-advised triple album – he sounds like he’s having masses of fun." He added that "‘Love Is for Losers’ finds him firmly in control, making his best album since American Idiot (2004)", a notion quoted on the vinyl release of the album. Dave Simpson of Pure Charts commended the album, saying that it "is an utterly entrancing synthesis of punk, rock and pop that features eleven fantastically spunky songs for fans to feast upon".

Some critics noted how the sound was different to that of Green Day, feeling that it would divide fans, while comparing its sound to that of Green Day's other side-project, Foxboro Hot Tubs, with The Soundboard Reviews stating that it shows that "Armstrong is working in a familiar territory with very few tracks stand out to grab your attention [sic]."

== Tour and promotion ==
The Longshot embarked on a tour shortly after the release of The Longshot EP, including songs from the album in addition to those on the EP. A music video for the album's title track, "Love Is for Losers", was released on April 20, 2018.

== Track listing ==
All songs by Billie Joe Armstrong, except "Goodbye to Romance" by Ozzy Osbourne, Randy Rhoads and Bob Daisley.

No.	Title	Length
1.	"The Last Time"	2:34
2.	"Taxi Driver"	2:33
3.	"Chasing a Ghost"	3:28
4.	"Body Bag"	2:45
5.	"Love Is for Losers"	2:41
6.	"Cult Hero"	2:51
7.	"Kill Your Friends"	2:28
8.	"Happiness"	2:55
9.	"Soul Surrender"	2:35
10.	"Turn Me Loose"	3:20
11.	"Goodbye to Romance" (Ozzy Osbourne cover)	4:22
Total length:		32:32

== Personnel ==
The Longshot

- Billie Joe Armstrong – vocals, guitars, bass, drums, producer, composer

Additional personnel (according to vinyl back cover)

- Chris Dugan – engineer (except 'The Last Time'), mixer
- Lee Bothwick – engineer ('The Last Time')
- Joey Armstrong – drums on "Happiness"
