= Goodbye Ellston Avenue =

Studio album by Pinhead Gunpowder
- Released: February 25, 1997
- Recorded: September 1996
- Studios: Sound and Vision Studios in San Francisco
- Genre: Punk rock
- Length: 23:54
- Labels: Lookout! Recess
- Producer: Kevin Army

Pinhead Gunpowder chronology
Carry the Banner (1994)	Goodbye Ellston Avenue (1997)	Shoot the Moon (1999)

Professional ratings
Review scores
Source	Rating
AllMusic	3/5 stars

Goodbye Ellston Avenue is the debut studio album by the American punk rock band Pinhead Gunpowder. It was released on February 25, 1997, through Lookout! Records. The album was re-released on vinyl and CD through Recess Records.

== Critical reception ==
Kerrang! called the album "Billie Joe at his punk-rock best."

== Track listing ==
All lyrics are written by Aaron Cometbus, except where noted; all music is composed by Pinhead Gunpowder, except where noted.

No.	Title	Lead vocals	Length
1.	"Life During Wartime"	Armstrong	1:49
2.	"Without Me"	White	1:29
3.	"High Maintenance" (written by Cometbus and Jason White)	Armstrong	1:36
4.	"Backyard Flames" (lyrics by Bill Schneider)	White	1:30
5.	"Song of My Returning" (written and originally performed by Phil Ochs)	Armstrong	2:28
6.	"Once More W/O Feeling"	White, Schneider, Armstrong	1:47
7.	"I Walk Alone"	White	1:17
8.	"Train Station" (music by Pinhead Gunpowder and Paul Curran)	Armstrong	1:30
9.	"Homesick Hopes" (lyrics by White)	White	1:46
10.	"Brother" (music by John Quittner)	Armstrong	3:20
11.	"Swan Song"	White, Schneider	1:38
12.	"Work for Food" (written by Eric Baffert; originally performed by The Big Foist)	White	1:33
13.	"The Great Divide"	Armstrong	2:15
Total length:			23:54

== Personnel ==
- Aaron Cometbus – drums
- Billie Joe Armstrong – vocals, guitar
- Jason White – vocals, guitar
- Bill Schneider – bass, vocals

Production

- Kevin Army – production
- John Golden – mastering
- Aaron Cometbus – graphic design, cover art
- Bill Schneider – photography
