= Robert Eggplant =

American musician

Robert Burnett, (born 1973) better known as Robert eggplant, is an American writer, publisher, musician and activist from Pinole, California, United States.

== Background ==
Robert eggplant has been the editor and publisher of the Absolutely Zippo fanzine since 1987. The zine has documented the East Bay punk subculture from a "front-lines" point-of-view, due to eggplant's intimate involvement with this scene. Contributors have included Aaron Cometbus, Larry Livermore, Jesse Michaels, and Billie Joe Armstrong. The zine has been compiled and released in a paperback edition entitled Absolutely Zippo!: Anthology Of A Fanzine 1988-1998.

Robert eggplant was one of the founding members of the seminal East Bay punk rock band, Blatz, in which he played guitar. The band released a number of recordings on Lookout! Records that are regarded as integral representations of the East Bay punk sound. They often released split recordings with Blatz on one side and notable bands like Filth and Tribe 8 on the other. During this time eggplant was also a volunteer at 924 Gilman Street Project, where Blatz frequently played. The band existed from 1989 till 1992. Eggplant's next group was The Hope Bombs which existed from 1994 until 1996.

In 1995, he became a member of the S.P.A.M. Records collective and helped organize Geekfest, the free festival that helped introduce a new sensibility into the punk rock scene. The Hope Bombs frequently played at Geekfest. He has played in Harbinger with Aaron Cometbus and John Geek, a fellow member of the S.P.A.M. Records collective and organizer of Geekfest, who also performs with his own bands, Fleshies and Street Eaters. Eggplant also formed a band with members of Absolutely Zippo called Fugitive Kind. All the groups he has been a member of are noted for their DIY ethics, working with independent record labels and playing all-ages shows. He is well known for holding memorable shows in his backyard in Pinole, California, including the last show by Operation Ivy.

== Publications ==
- Absolutely Zippo 1989 -
- Absolutely Zippo: Anthology of a Fanzine, 2006

== Discography ==
=== Blatz ===
- Cheaper Than The Beer, Lookout! Records (1991)
- Stranger Fruit, split LP with Tribe 8, Lookout! Records (1992)
- Bitches and Brew, split single with Tribe 8, Lookout! Records (1992)
- A Touch Of Blatz/Filth, split LP with Filth, Lookout! Records (1992)
- The Shit Split, split LP with Filth, Lookout! Records (1992)

=== The Hope Bombs ===
- Sex With Euclid, Pug Records (1995)

=== Harbinger ===
- Challenging The Prevailing Judeo-Christian Doomsday Mentality, LP, Riisk (2005)
