= Shoot the Moon (EP) =

EP by Pinhead Gunpowder
- Released: March 30, 1999
- Recorded: October, 1998 in Billie Joe Armstrong's Basement
- Genre: Punk rock
- Length: 11:57
- Labels: Adeline; Recess (reissue)
- Producer: Billie Joe Armstrong

Pinhead Gunpowder chronology
Goodbye Ellston Avenue (1997)	Shoot the Moon (1999)	Dillinger Four / Pinhead Gunpowder (2000)

Professional ratings
Review scores
Source	Rating
Allmusic	3/5 stars

Shoot the Moon is the fourth EP by the American punk rock band Pinhead Gunpowder. It was released on March 30, 1999 through Adeline Records. It was re-released on CD and vinyl through Recess Records on February 12, 2010. It was re-released on vinyl in 2022 by 1, 2, 3, 4 Go! Records.

== Track listing ==
All lyrics are written by Aaron Cometbus, except where noted; all music is composed by Pinhead Gunpowder, except where noted.

No.	Title	Lead vocals	Length
1.	"Cabot Gal" (written by Jason White)	White	1:46
2.	"My Boot in Your Face Is What Keeps Me Alive"	Armstrong	1:10
3.	"Asheville" (music by Pinhead Gunpowder and John Quittner)	White, Armstrong	1:23
4.	"Junkpile"	Armstrong	1:49
5.	"27" (written by Wilhelm Fink (Note: Wilhelm Fink is another name for Billie Joe Armstrong, the writer of the track "27".))	Armstrong	1:30
6.	"Kathleen"	Armstrong	1:26
7.	"Achin' to Be" (written by Paul Westerberg; originally performed by The Replacements)	White	2:49
Total length:			11:57

== Personnel ==
- Aaron Cometbus – drums
- Billie Joe Armstrong – guitar, vocals
- Jason White – guitar, vocals
- Bill Schneider – bass

Production

- Billie Joe Armstrong – producer
- Ramón Bretón – mastering
- Aaron Cometbus – graphic design, artwork
- Bill Schneider – photography
