= Fleshies =

American punk rock band

- Origin: Oakland, California; United States
- Genre: punk rock
- Years active: 1999–present
- Labels: S.P.A.M. Records; Alternative Tentacles; Dirt Cult Records; Adeline Records; Geykido Comet Records; Recess Records; Life Is Abuse Records; Thrillhouse Records
- Members: Mattowar; Vonny Bon Bons; John Geek/Johnny No Moniker/John No; Brian Plastik; Hamiltron

Fleshies is an American punk rock band from Oakland, California, United States, that released three albums on Jello Biafra's Alternative Tentacles, Kill the Dreamer's Dream, The Sicilian, and Scrape the Walls. Fleshies have also released albums on Recess Records ("Brown Flag"), Adeline Records ("The Futbol EP"), Life is Abuse Records, Thrillhouse Records and S.P.A.M. Records, as well as singles, 7" records and splits on a variety of labels. They are known for their outlandish stage presence, their left-wing politics and their non-stop world touring schedule from 1999 to 2006. From their inception, they were an influential presence at events such as Geekfest, held in the late 1990s, The Fest in Gainesville, Florida, and Wantage Records' Total Fest. As of May 2019, the band released Introducing The Fleshies on Portland's Dirt Cult Records, its first album in ten years.

Members of the band have also played (or currently play) in projects such as Triclops!, Harbinger, Meercaz and the Visions, Street Eaters, Swiftumz, Pigs, and Pins of Light

== Discography ==
=== Studio albums ===
- Arbgabdo, Baby! (Tape only, 1999)
- Fleshies (CD demo also known as The Baby, S.P.A.M. 2000; reissued on Thrillhouse Records in 2010 on LP)
- Kill The Dreamer's Dream (S.P.A.M / Alternative Tentacles, 2001)
- The Sicilian (Alternative Tentacles, 2003)
- Gung Ho! (7" Tracks, B-sides, Comp Tracks Collection), (Life is Abuse Records, 2004)
- Scrape the Walls (Alternative Tentacles, 2006)
- Brown Flag (Recess Records and Recess Records Japan, 2009 and 2010)
- Introducing The Fleshies (Dirt Cult Records, 2019)

=== Singles and EPs ===
- Playdough EP (Split 7" with The Jocks, S.P.A.M. Records/Risk Records, 2000)
- The Phantom Limbs / Fleshies (Split 7" with The Phantom Limbs, S.P.A.M./Mungaso Records, 2001)
- Federation X / Fleshies (Split 7" with Federation X, Molasses Manifesto Records, 2001)
- Victim's Family / Fleshies (Split 7" with Victim's Family, Alternative Tentacles, 2001)
- The Game Of Futbol (Adeline Records, 2002)
- Fleshies / Toys That Kill (split picture disc 7", Geykido Comet Records, 2003)

=== Compilation contributions ===
- Apocalypse Always (Alternative Tentacles, 2002)
- Dropping Food On Their Heads is Not Enough: Benefit For RAWA (Geykido Comet Records, 2002)
- This Just In... Benefit For Indy Media (Geykido Comet Records, 2005)
- Noisy DVD compilation - four tracks filmed live in London (Punkervision, 2005)
- Noise Ordinance LP compilation, put out by Maximumrocknroll Magazine (MRR, 2011)

== See also ==
- Alternative Tentacles
- Adeline Records
- Maximumrocknroll
