= Federation X =

American rock band

- Origin: Bellingham, Washington, United States
- Years active: 1998–present
- Labels: Molasses Manifesto, Estrus Records, Wantage USA, Tapes Records
- Members: Ben Wildenhaus; Bill Badgley; Beau Boyd
- Past members: Josh Holland

Federation X or "FED X" is an American rock band, originally formed in Bellingham, Washington, founded by Ben Wildenhaus (guitar), Bill Badgley (guitar, vocals), and Beau Boyd (drums) in 1998.

== Career ==
In 1999, the band released a self-titled LP on its own Molasses Manifesto Records, then followed it in 2001 with American Folk Horror, recorded by Tim Green at Louder Studios in San Francisco and released by Bellingham's Estrus Records. In 2003, Estrus released X Patriot, recorded by Steve Albini at Electrical Audio in Chicago. In 2005, Estrus released Rally Day, recorded by Ryan Anderson at MARS Studio in Bellingham. Wantage USA released Rally Day on vinyl. In 2006, Josh Holland of Dog Shredder joined the band for a West Coast tour and at a recording session at MARS Studio, which produced the songs "Only Fool" and "Chinese Food and Vietnam," released as a 7-inch on Recess Records in 2012. In March 2013, Federation X recorded its fifth studio album with Deaf Nephews recording and producing at Entourage Studios in Los Angeles. Entitled We Do What We Must, it was released in 2013 on Recess Records and the band's own Molasses Manifesto.

Wildenhaus performs solo under the name Ben von Wildenhaus' while Boyd has a side project called Zorbatron. Badgley, under the name William E. Badgley, owns and operates Molasses Manifesto, a company that produces films, books, music, and art and is responsible for the film Kill All Redneck Pricks: A Documentary Film about a Band Called KARP. Badgley also owns and operates The Documentary Center in Bellingham, Washington, and performs with the electronic band Part Wolf.

== Discography ==
=== Albums ===
- Fighting Words (1998) Cassette-Only, Molasses Manifesto
- Federation X (1999)
- American Folk Horror (2001)
- Z Montany +2, Tour-Only CD, Self-Released with Irritant Records
- X Patriot (2003)
- Rally Day (2005)
- We Do What We Must (2013)

=== Singles ===
- "Only Fool" / "Chinese Food and Vietnam" (2013)
