= Billie Joe Armstrong =

American rock musician and songwriter (born 1972)

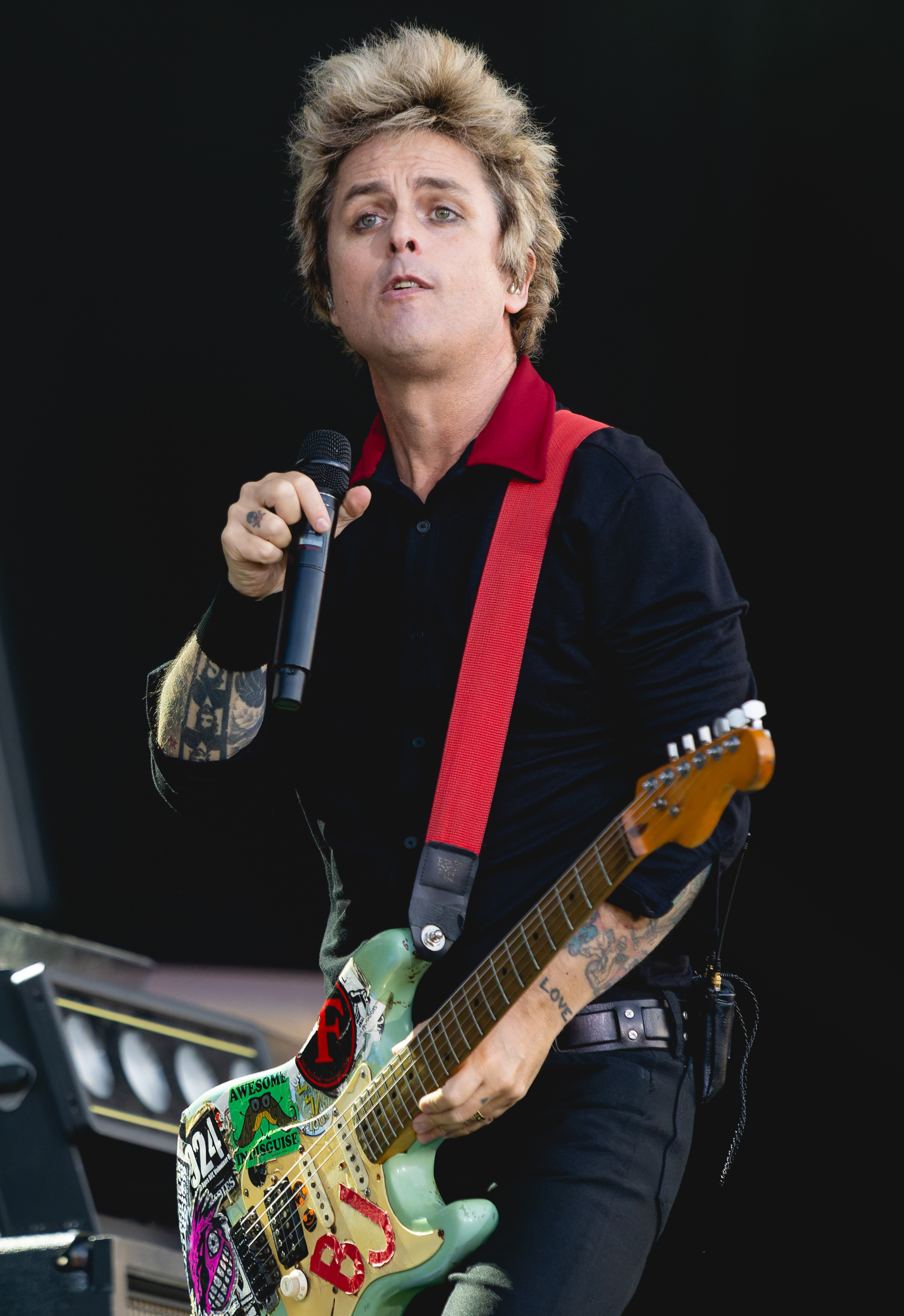
- Armstrong performing at the Isle of Wight Festival 2024
- Born: February 17, 1972 (age 54); Oakland, California, U.S.
- Other names: Fink; Wilhelm Fink; Reverend Strychnine Twitch
- Occupations: Musician; singer-songwriter; actor; businessman
- Spouse: Adrienne Nesser (m. 1994)
- Children: 2
- Awards: Full list
- Musical career
- Genres: Alternative rock; garage rock; hardcore punk; new wave; pop-punk; power pop; punk rock; skate punk
- Instruments: Vocals; guitar; harmonica; piano
- Years active: 1977–present
- Labels: Fiat; Reprise; Lookout; Epitaph; Fat Wreck Chords
- Member of: Green Day; Pinhead Gunpowder; The Network; Foxboro Hot Tubs; The Coverups; The Longshot; The Armstrongs; The Boo; The Upside Downers
- Formerly of: Desecrated Youth; Corrupted Morals

Billie Joe Armstrong (born February 17, 1972) is an American musician, songwriter and actor. He is best known for being the lead vocalist, guitarist, and primary songwriter of the rock band Green Day, which he co-founded with Mike Dirnt in 1987. He is also a guitarist and vocalist for the punk rock band Pinhead Gunpowder, and provides lead vocals for Green Day's side projects Foxboro Hot Tubs, the Network, the Longshot and the Coverups. Armstrong has been considered by critics as one of the greatest punk rock guitarists of all time, as well as one of the greatest punk rock singers of all time.

Armstrong developed an interest in music at a young age, and recorded his first song at the age of five. He met Dirnt while attending elementary school, and the two instantly bonded over their interest in music, forming the band Sweet Children when the two were 14 years old. The band later changed its name to Green Day. Armstrong has also pursued musical projects including numerous collaborations with other musicians.

Armstrong has acted in several films and TV series, including Like Sunday, Like Rain, Ordinary World, King of the Hill, Haunted, and Drunk History. In addition to co-writing the book and lyrics for American Idiot, a jukebox musical featuring several of Green Day's songs, Armstrong portrayed the role of St. Jimmy in the show for several weeks during its run on Broadway.

Armstrong's business ventures include founding Adeline Records to help support other bands in 1997, coinciding with the release of Nimrod. Adeline signed acts such as the Frustrators, AFI, and Dillinger Four. Armstrong also co-founded Punk Bunny Coffee (formerly Oakland Coffee Works) in 2015.

== Early life ==
Armstrong was born in Oakland, California, on February 17, 1972, the youngest of six children of Ollie Jackson (born 1932) and Andrew Marsicano Armstrong (1928–1982). He was raised in Rodeo, California. His father, a jazz musician and truck driver for Safeway, died of esophageal cancer on September 10, 1982, when Armstrong was 10 years old. The song "Wake Me Up When September Ends" is a memorial to his father. Armstrong has five siblings, including three older sisters, Marci, Hollie, and Anna, and two older brothers, David and Alan. His mother worked as a waitress at Rod's Hickory Pit in El Cerrito, California, where he and Mike Dirnt later played their first gig in 1987. His great-great-grandparents Pietro Marsicano and Teresa Nigro were Italian immigrants from Viggiano, who settled in Boston prior to relocating to Berkeley, California, in 1869.

Armstrong attended Hillcrest Elementary School in Rodeo, where a teacher encouraged him to record a song titled "Look for Love" at the age of five on the Bay Area label Fiat Records. At the age of 10, he met future bandmate Mike Dirnt in the school cafeteria, and they immediately bonded over their love of music. He became interested in punk rock after being introduced to the genre by his brothers. He has cited Van Halen, Ramones, the Replacements, and Hüsker Dü as musical influences. The first concert he ever attended was Van Halen in 1984. After Hillcrest Elementary, Armstrong attended Carquinez Middle School and John Swett High School, both in Crockett, California, and later transferred to Pinole Valley High School in Pinole, California. On his 18th birthday, he dropped out to pursue a musical career.

== Career ==
In 1987, aged 15, Armstrong formed a band called Sweet Children with his childhood friend Mike Dirnt. In the beginning, Armstrong and Dirnt both played guitar, with Raj Punjabi on drums and Sean Hughes on bass. Punjabi was later replaced on drums by John Kiffmeyer, also known as Al Sobrante. After a few performances, Hughes left the band in 1988; Dirnt then began playing bass and they became a three-piece band. They changed their name to Green Day in April 1989, choosing the name because of their fondness for marijuana.

In 1989, Green Day released their debut EP, 1,000 Hours, through Lookout! Records. They recorded their debut studio album, 39/Smooth, and the extended play Slappy in 1990, which were later combined with 1,000 Hours into the compilation 1,039/Smoothed Out Slappy Hours in 1991.

In 1990, Armstrong provided lead guitar and backing vocals on three songs for the Lookouts' final EP, IV, which featured Tré Cool on drums. Tré became Green Day's drummer in late 1990 after Sobrante left to go to college. Cool made his debut on Green Day's second album, Kerplunk (1991).

In 1991, Armstrong joined the band Pinhead Gunpowder, consisting of bassist Bill Schneider, drummer Aaron Cometbus, and fellow vocalist/guitarist Sarah Kirsch. Kirsch left the group in 1992, and was replaced by Jason White. The group has released several extended plays and albums from 1991 to the present, and performs live shows on an intermittent basis.

In 1993, Armstrong played live several times with California punk band Rancid. Rancid's lead singer, Tim Armstrong (no relation), asked Billie Joe Armstrong to join his band, but he refused due to his progress with Green Day. However, Billie Joe Armstrong was credited as a co-writer on Rancid's 1993 song, Radio.

With their third LP, Dookie (1994), Green Day broke through into the mainstream, and have remained one of the most popular rock bands of the 1990s and 2000s with over 60 million records sold worldwide. The album was followed by Insomniac (1995), Nimrod (1997), and Warning (2000).

Armstrong collaborated with many artists. He co-wrote the Go-Go's 2001 song "Unforgiven". He has also co-written songs with Penelope Houston ("The Angel and The Jerk" and "New Day"), and sung backing vocals with Melissa Auf der Maur on Ryan Adams' "Do Miss America" (where they acted as the backing band for Iggy Pop on his album Skull Ring ("Private Hell" and "Supermarket"). Armstrong produced an album for the Riverdales. He was part of the Green Day side project the Network from 2003 to 2005, which became active again in 2020. The Network released two albums: 2003's Money Money 2020 and 2020's Money Money 2020 Part II: We Told Ya So!.

Hoping to clear his head and develop new ideas for songs, Armstrong traveled to New York City alone for a few weeks in 2003, renting a small apartment in the East Village of Manhattan. He spent much of this time taking long walks and participating in jam sessions in the basement of Hi-Fi, a bar in Manhattan. However, the friends he made during this time drank too much for his liking, which was the catalyst for Armstrong's return to the Bay Area. After returning home, Armstrong was arrested for driving under the influence on January 5, 2003, and released on $1,200 bail.

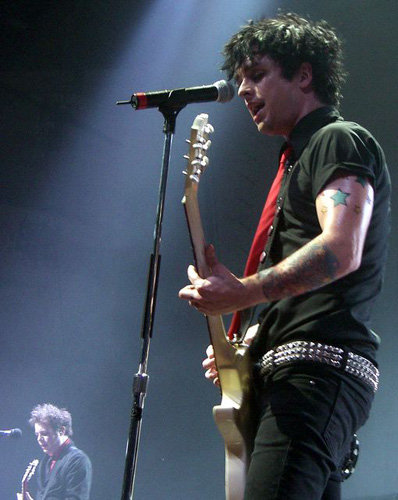
Armstrong performing in 2005

In 2004, Green Day debuted American Idiot, their first rock opera. The album has sold more than 15,000,000 copies worldwide, fueled by the hit singles "American Idiot", "Boulevard of Broken Dreams" and "Wake Me Up When September Ends". In 2009, Green Day released 21st Century Breakdown, the band's second rock opera, which was another commercial success. Between these two projects, Armstrong was the lead vocalist of the Green Day side project Foxboro Hot Tubs, who formed in 2007 and have performed intermittent live shows ever since. Foxboro Hot Tubs released one album, Stop Drop and Roll!!!, in 2008.

In 2009, Armstrong formed a band called Rodeo Queens, along with members of Green Day and NYC punk rocker Jesse Malin. They released one song, along with a video, called "Depression Times".

In 2009, American Idiot was adapted into a Broadway musical, also called American Idiot. The musical won two Tony Awards. Armstrong appeared in American Idiot in the role of St. Jimmy for two stints in late 2010 and early 2011.

In 2012, Green Day released a trio of albums: ¡Uno!, ¡Dos!, and ¡Tré!. In 2013, Armstrong appeared on Season 3 of NBC's The Voice as an assistant mentor for Christina Aguilera's team. In 2013, Armstrong and singer-songwriter Norah Jones released the album Foreverly, consisting of covers of songs from the Everly Brothers' album Songs Our Daddy Taught Us. The first single from the album, "Long Time Gone", was released on October 23.

=== 2012 substance abuse ===
On September 21, 2012, during a Green Day performance at Las Vegas' iHeartRadio Music Festival, Armstrong became agitated onstage and stopped the band's set midway through their performance of the 1994 hit song "Basket Case". In an expletive-filled rant, Armstrong criticized the event's promoters for allegedly cutting short the band's performance, before smashing his guitar and storming off stage. The band later issued a statement apologizing for the incident and clarifying that their set had not actually been cut short. The incident occurred just four days prior to the release of Green Day's ninth studio album, ¡Uno!

Two days after the incident at the iHeartRadio Music Festival, Green Day announced that Armstrong was seeking treatment for an unspecified substance abuse problem. As a result, scheduled appearances on Jimmy Kimmel Live and The Ellen DeGeneres Show were canceled. According to Claudia Suarez Wright, Tre Cool's ex-wife and the mother of Armstrong's godson, Armstrong had been drinking heavily in Las Vegas prior to the iHeartRadio Music Festival, following approximately one year of sobriety.

Armstrong gave an interview to Rolling Stone in March 2013 in which he said that he had "been trying to get sober since 1997, right around Nimrod". He discussed how, during the 21st Century Breakdown tour of 2009–2010, "There were meltdowns on that tour that were huge". Armstrong detailed his addiction, in particular how it had escalated in the months prior to the release of the ¡Uno!, ¡Dos!, and ¡Tre! albums and the performance at iHeartRadio, stating that during the band's 2011 summer tour of Europe, "I was at my pill-taking height at that time, medicating the shit out of myself". Armstrong gave details of a gig at Irving Plaza in New York just over a week before the iHeartRadio incident, in which he "Threw back four or five beers before we went on and probably had four or five when we played. Then I drank my body weight in alcohol after that. I ended up hungover on the West Side Highway, laying in a little park."

Green Day canceled all remaining concert dates for 2012 and early 2013 as Armstrong continued dealing with his personal problems. In late December 2012, the band announced they would return to touring at the end of March 2013. Armstrong later said that the substances he had been abusing were alcohol and prescription pills for anxiety and insomnia.

=== 2013 onward ===
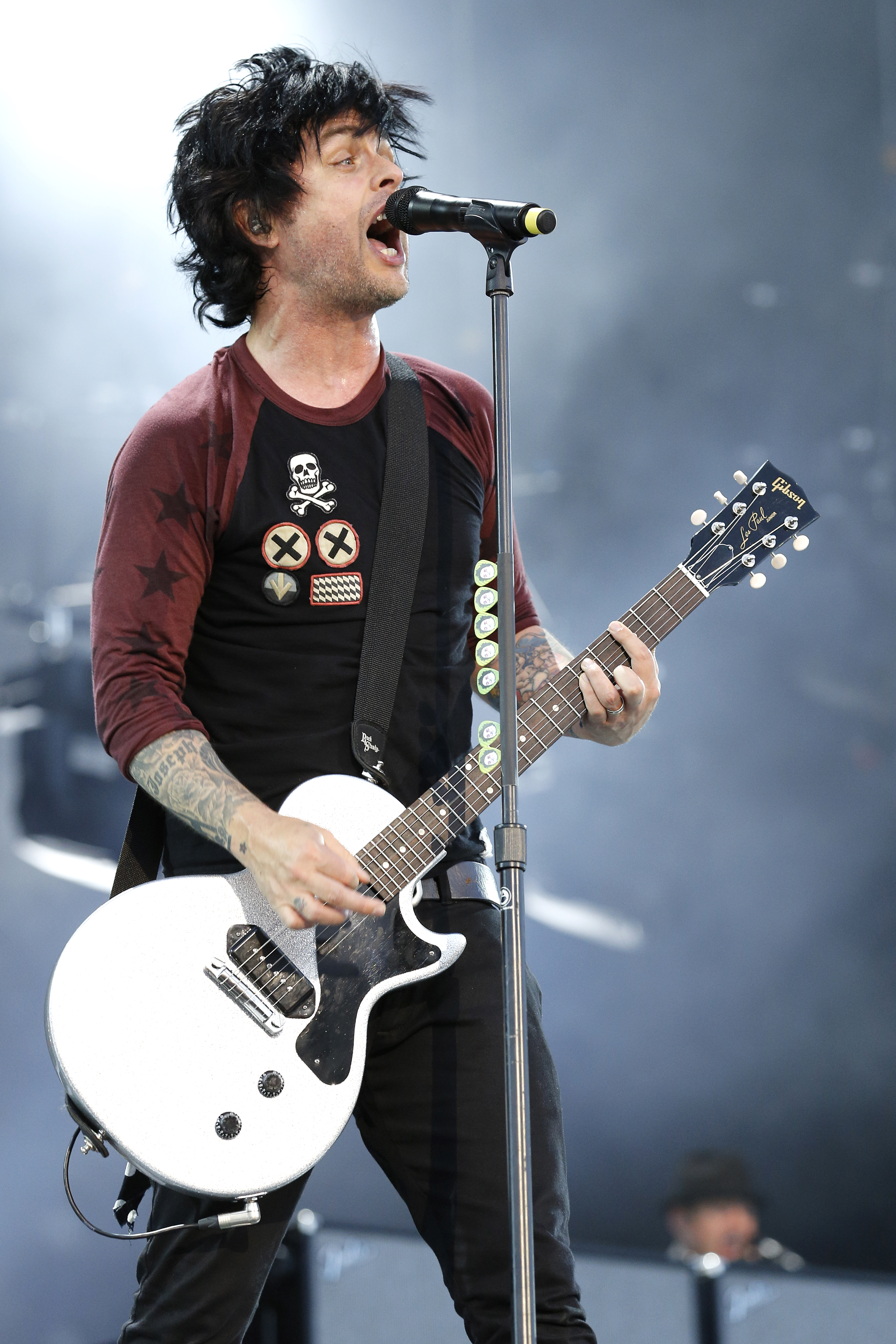
Armstrong in 2013

Armstrong also collaborated with the comedy hip hop group Lonely Island in their song "I Run NY" from The Wack Album released on June 7, 2013. He starred alongside Leighton Meester in the 2014 film Like Sunday, Like Rain. For his work in the film, Billie Joe won the Breakout Performance Award at the 2014 Williamsburg Independent Film Festival. Armstrong wrote songs for These Paper Bullets, a rock musical adaptation of Much Ado About Nothing, which premiered at Yale Repertory Theater in March 2014.

In 2014, Armstrong joined the Replacements for a number of shows beginning on April 19 at Coachella. Frontman Paul Westerberg had been suffering with back problems and spent the majority of the gig lying on a sofa while Armstrong helped play his parts. Westerberg referred to Billie Joe as an "expansion of the band". Armstrong joined the Replacements on stage again at the Shaky Knees Music Festival in Atlanta in May.

In November 2014, Armstrong moved with his son Joseph to New York and began working on another acting role, in the film Ordinary World. It was Armstrong's first lead acting role. The film centers on the mid-life crisis of a husband and father who attempts to revisit his punk past, and was released in 2016. It included new songs written and performed by Armstrong. The film got mixed reviews, although Armstrong's own performance was generally praised, with The Village Voice writing that he had "a low-key charm suggesting that, if he desired it, he could get more onscreen gigs in between albums."

In October 2016, Green Day released their album Revolution Radio. In July 2017, Armstrong formed a supergroup with Tim Armstrong of Rancid, named the Armstrongs.

In April 2018, Armstrong formed the rock band the Longshot, and on April 20, the band released their debut studio album, Love Is for Losers. Shortly after, Armstrong announced that he and the Longshot would embark on a summer tour. Aside from Armstrong, the band's lineup consists of Kevin Preston and David S. Field of the band Prima Donna on lead guitar and drums, respectively, and longtime Green Day live member Jeff Matika on bass.

In 2019, Armstrong co-wrote and performed the track "Strangers & Thieves" on the album Sunset Kids by Jesse Malin.

In February 2020, Green Day released their thirteenth album, Father of All Motherfuckers.

Green Day's fourteenth album, Saviors, was released on January 19, 2024.. In October 2024, Armstrong's band Pinhead Gunpowder released Unt, their first album of new material since 2008.

Armstrong also continued performing with The Coverups, a side project formed with Green Day members and friends that performs cover songs. In 2024, the group played a series of small club shows, including performances in London.

== Artistry ==
Armstrong is known for his frequent use of palm-muted, power chord-driven guitar riffs, and melodic guitar solos. His strumming style makes use of techniques such as stubbing and fret hand muting, which allows him to strum power chords harder while attacking all six strings on the guitar. Armstrong usually sings in lower vocal ranges. According to Ilana Kaplan of Alternative Press: "[Armstrong] doesn't necessarily belt like some of the others [...] but that it's what's given many of the band's hits their palpable grit. Green Day's songs have more of a punk sheen than pop because of Armstrong."

== Instruments ==
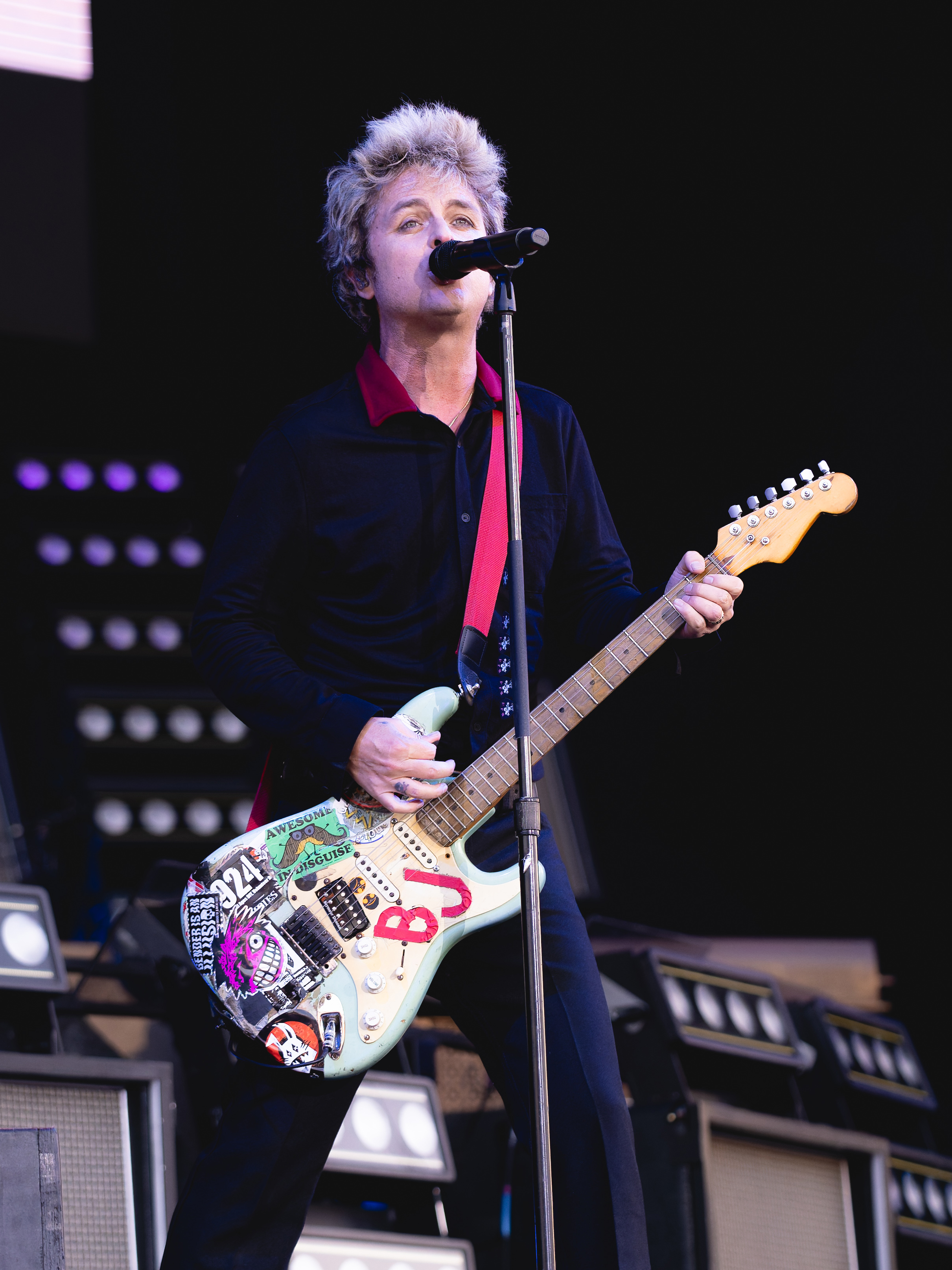
Armstrong performing with his original "Blue" in 2024

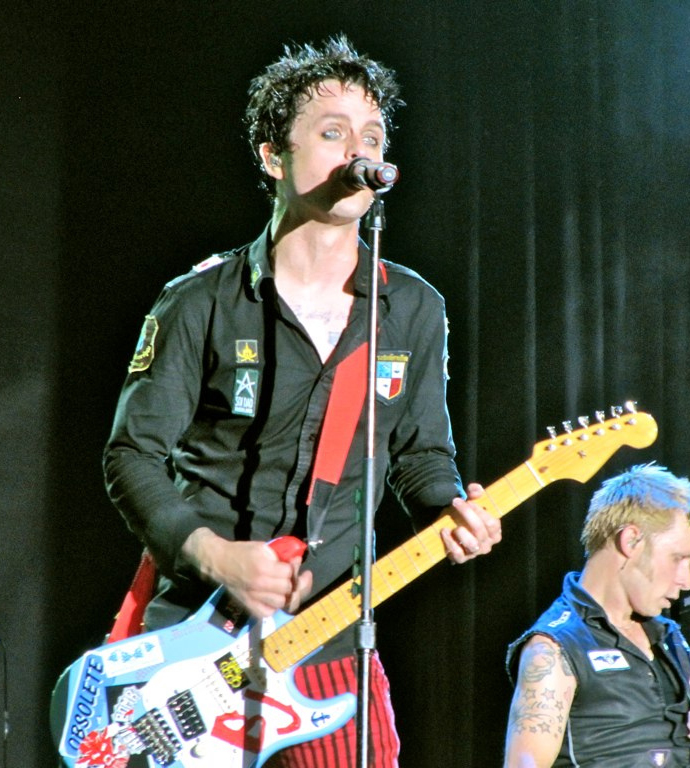
Armstrong performing with Fender "Blue" replica in 2010

Armstrong's first guitar was a Cherry Red Hohner acoustic, which his father bought for him. He received his first electric guitar, a Fernandes The Revival RST-50 Stratocaster that he named "Blue", when he was ten years old in 1982, the same year his father died. His mother got "Blue" from George Cole, who taught Armstrong to play guitar for 10 years. Armstrong says in a 1995 MTV interview, "Basically, it wasn't like guitar lessons because I never really learned how to read music. So he just taught me how to put my hands on the thing." Cole bought the guitar new from David Margen of the band Santana. Cole installed the Bill Lawrence L500XL Humbucker pickup in the bridge position at an angle, similar to Eddie Van Halen's guitar Frankenstrat, which caused Armstrong to be very influenced by Van Halen. The L500XL is the same pickup that was used by Dimebag Darrell of Pantera. Armstrong replaced the L500XL with a white Yamaha Pacifica humbucker at Woodstock '94.

Armstrong later reinstalled the Bill Lawrence L500XL pickup before recording Insomniac, although he switched to a black Seymour Duncan SH-4 JB in 1995. He toured with this guitar from the band's early days and still uses it to this day.

Marc Spitz writes that, "Armstrong fetishized his teacher's guitar, partly because the blue instrument had a sound quality and Van Halen-worthy fluidity he couldn't get from his little red Hohner. He prized it mostly, however, because of his relationship with Cole, another father figure after the death of Andy."

Both middle and neck pickups are disconnected and the pickup selector is locked in the bridge position. This also applies to his backup guitar and "Blue" copies, mainly Fender Stratocasters. "Blue" appears in a number of Green Day music videos such as "Longview", "Welcome to Paradise", "Basket Case", "Geek Stink Breath", "Stuck with Me", "Brain Stew/Jaded", "Hitchin' a Ride", and "Minority". "Blue" also appears on the album cover of Insomniac. The "BJ" on Blue stands for Billie Joe, inspired by Stevie Ray Vaughan, whose Stratocaster has his own initials ("SRV") on the pickguard.

Today, Armstrong mainly uses Gibson and Fender guitars. Twenty of his Gibson guitars are Les Paul Junior models from the mid- to late-1950s. His Fender collection includes Stratocasters, Jazzmasters, Telecasters, a Gretsch hollowbody, Rickenbacker 360 and his copies of "Blue" from Fender Custom Shop. Recently he has begun giving away guitars to audience members invited to play on stage with Green Day, usually during the songs "Knowledge" or "Longview". He states that his favorite guitar is a 1956 Gibson Les Paul Junior he calls "Floyd", which he bought in 2000 just before recording the album Warning.

Armstrong also has three of his own Les Paul Junior signature models from Gibson. The first has been in production since 2006 and is modeled closely after "Floyd". The second began production in 2012 and is a TV Yellow double-cutaway Junior. Both models include a Gibson "H-90" pickup, exclusive to Armstrong's models. Gibson has also released an extremely limited run of acoustic signature guitars. Epiphone has release lower-priced version of his signature Gibson Les Paul Junior in 2022.

Armstrong's amplifiers consist of a pair of Marshall 100-watt 1959 Super Lead reissues he acquired sometime before Green Day's Woodstock '94 performance and had modified for increased distortion. Nicknamed "Meat" and "Pete", the two amps are run in conjunction for a fuller sound, with a Boss BD-2 Blues Driver used for solos. For clean tones, Armstrong uses a rackmount Custom Audio Electronics 3+ SE tube preamp, and all three amplifiers are run through a pair of Marshall 1960B cabinets with Celestion Vintage 30 speakers. In 2019, MXR released Armstrong's signature overdrive pedal, the Dookie Drive, which aimed to reproduce his dual-Marshall setup and was decorated with the cover art from the Dookie album. MXR later rebranded the pedal as the FOD Drive. In 2026, Marshall released the 1959BJA Billie Joe Armstrong Artist Signature amplifier, the brand's first signature amp model in fourteen years. The 1959BJA is a recreation of Armstrong's modified 1959 Super Leads and comes in a baby blue tolex covering in homage to "Blue", Armstrong's first electric guitar.

Armstrong plays several other instruments as well as guitar. He recorded harmonica and mandolin parts on Nimrod and Warning, piano parts on 21st Century Breakdown, American Idiot: The Original Broadway Cast Recording (2010), ¡Tré!, and Revolution Radio, and plays drums and bass occasionally.

== Personal life ==
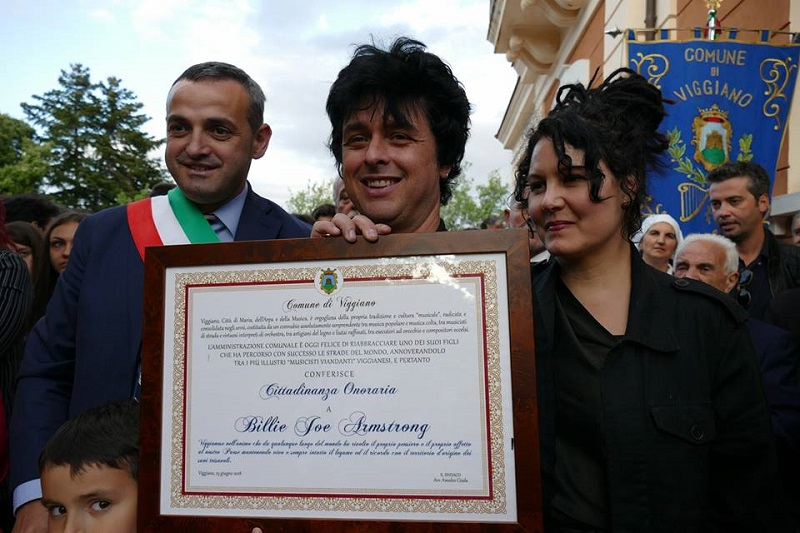
Armstrong receiving his honorary Viggiano citizenship in 2018

In June 2018, Armstrong was given honorary citizenship of Viggiano, the Italian commune from where his paternal great-great-grandparents hailed, by Viggiano's mayor Amedeo Cicala.

He believes in a higher power, and prays.

Armstrong is a fan of soccer and is one of the co-owners of Oakland Roots SC.

Armstrong is a member of the board of directors of Project Chimps, a sanctuary for former research chimpanzees.

In 2024, Green Day saw several Las Vegas radio stations pull their songs after Armstrong described the city as a "shithole" following the relocation of the Oakland Athletics to the city.

=== Business ventures ===
In 1997, Armstrong co-founded Adeline Records, a rock and punk rock record label which had, in recent years, been managed by Pat Magnarella, Green Day's manager. Adeline Records closed in August 2017 following Magnarella's split from Green Day.

In April 2015, Armstrong opened Broken Guitars (now Oakland Guitars), a guitar shop in Oakland, California with fellow Pinhead Gunpowder member and longtime Green Day associate, Bill Schneider.

In December 2015, Armstrong and Mike Dirnt launched a coffee company, Oakland Coffee Works (which has since been rebranded to Punk Bunny Coffee). The company sells organic coffee beans and is said to be the first company to use mass-produced compostable bags and pods.

In 2025, Armstrong became part-owner of the Oakland Ballers in the Pioneer League, an independent baseball league.

=== Fashion ===
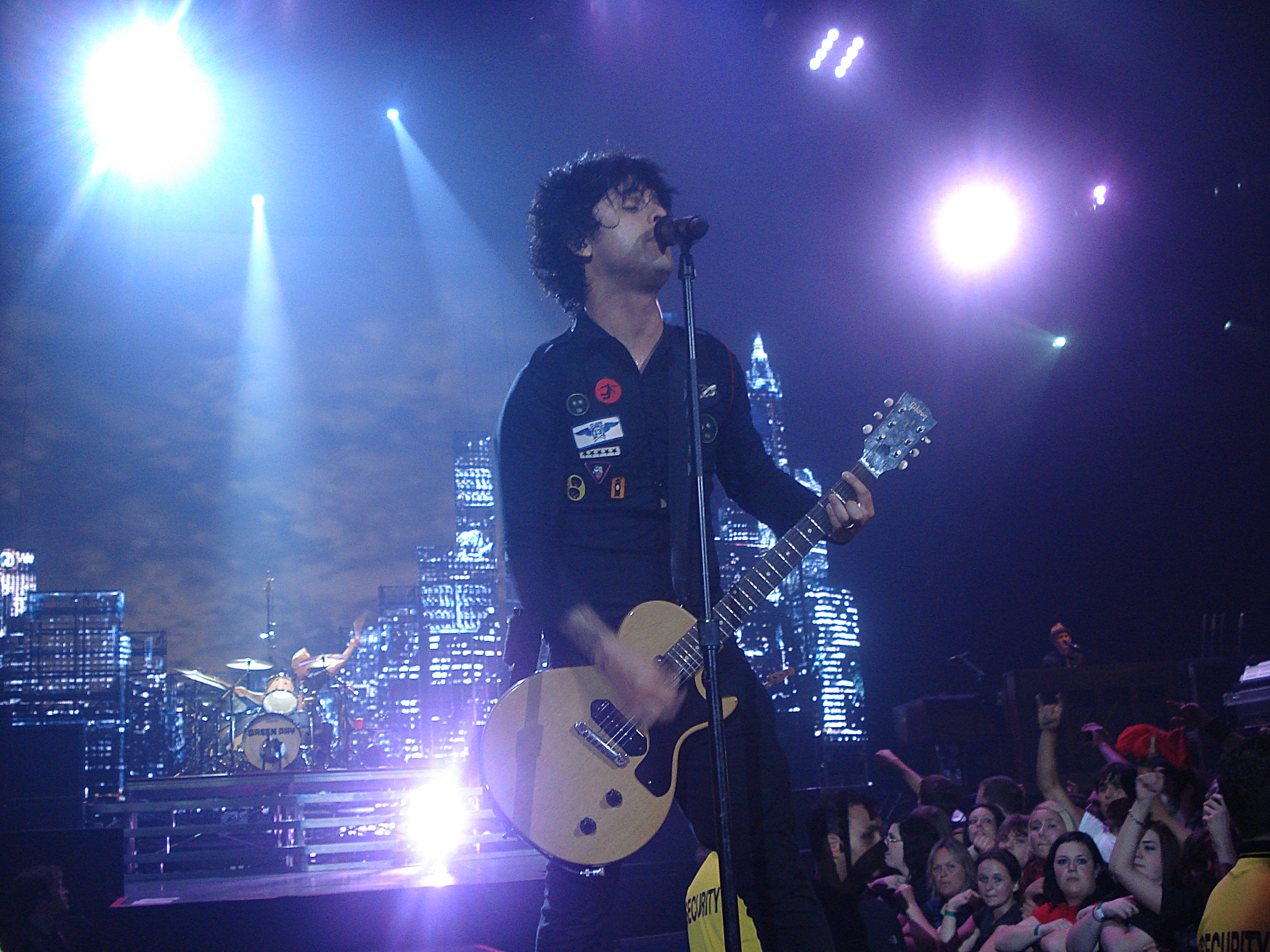
Armstrong performing in 2009, dressed in his signature punk style

Armstrong has been noted for his punk fashion style, which influenced his followers of previous and current generations to the point of being known as a "style icon". He also launched an eye liner with Kat Von D named "Basket Case", which is a cosmetic that he implemented as part of his singing character since his beginnings.

=== Political views ===
Armstrong supported Barack Obama during the 2008 and 2012 presidential elections, and Bernie Sanders in the 2016 presidential election. Following Sanders' defeat in the Democratic primaries, Armstrong declared his support for Hillary Clinton. He was critical of Donald Trump during the election and throughout Trump's presidency, calling him a "fascist" and a "puppet of the Illuminati", comparing him to Adolf Hitler, and blaming "uneducated white working-class people" for his rise to power. During Green Day's performance at ABC's Dick Clark's New Year's Rockin' Eve with Ryan Seacrest 2024, Armstrong changed the lyrics of "American Idiot" to "I'm not a part of a MAGA agenda". In a 2017 Rolling Stone interview, he stated that he does not align himself with any political party and described himself as an independent. He again supported Sanders during the 2020 presidential election, later endorsing Joe Biden after Sanders lost the primary. Following the U.S. Supreme Court decision Dobbs v. Jackson Women's Health Organization, Armstrong announced his plans to renounce his United States citizenship. Armstrong endorsed Kamala Harris on the day of the 2024 election.

Armstrong has spoken out in support of transgender people. In a 2024 interview with the Times, Armstrong spoke to the ways that he is still weaving his sexuality into his songwriting. The newspaper asked him about Green Day's opinions on the moral panic surrounding transgender youth, to which the singer responded, "I just think they're fucking close-minded." "It's like people are afraid of their children," he told the newspaper. "Why would you be afraid? Why don't you let your kid just be the kid that they are?"

Throughout 2025, Armstrong spoke out in support of Palestine during appearances with Green Day. In February 2025 at the Malaysia National Hockey Stadium in Kuala Lumpur, Malaysia, Armstrong displayed support for Palestine by draping a Palestinian flag from a fan over his shoulder while performing a song. During Green Day's April 2025 set at Coachella, Armstrong modified the lyrics to "Jesus of Suburbia" in reference to the Gaza war, changing the line "Runnin' away from pain when you've been victimized" to "Runnin' away from pain, like the kids from Palestine."

=== Relationships and sexuality ===
Armstrong has identified himself as bisexual, saying in a 1995 interview with The Advocate, "I think I've always been bisexual. I mean, it's something that I've always been interested in. I think people are born bisexual, and it's just that our parents and society kind of veer us off into this feeling of, 'Oh, I can't.' They say it's taboo. It's ingrained in our heads that it's bad, when it's not bad at all. It's a very beautiful thing." In February 2014, he again discussed his bisexuality in a Rolling Stone article about the Green Day album Dookie, which he described as "touch[ing] on bisexuality a lot".

In 1990, Armstrong met Adrienne Nesser at one of Green Day's early performances in Minneapolis. They married on July 2, 1994, with Nesser discovering that she was pregnant the day after their wedding. Their son Joey was born on February 28, 1995, while their second son Jakob was born on September 12, 1998. Both sons are musicians, with the former previously being the drummer of the band SWMRS.

== Awards ==
Year	Award	Presented By
2008	50 Sexiest People in Rock (#1) (Readers Choice)	Kerrang!
2010	Top Frontmen of All Time (#25) (Readers Choice)	Gibson

== Discography ==
=== Solo releases ===
Albums

- Foreverly (2013, with Norah Jones)
- No Fun Mondays (2020)

Singles

- "Look for Love" (1977)
- "Long Time Gone" (2013)
- "I Think We're Alone Now" (2020)
- "Manic Monday" (2020)
- "That Thing You Do!" (2020)
- "Kids in America" (2020)
- "You Can't Put Your Arms Around a Memory" (2020)
- "Corpus Christi" (2020)
- "War Stories" (2020)
- "Amico" (2020)
- "Not That Way Anymore" (2020)
- "That's Rock 'n' Roll" (2020)
- "Gimme Some Truth" (2020)
- "A New England" (2020)

=== Green Day ===
- 39/Smooth (1990) – lead vocals, guitar
- Kerplunk! (1991) – lead vocals, guitar, drums and backing vocals on "Dominated Love Slave"
- Dookie (1994) – lead vocals, guitar
- Insomniac (1995) – lead vocals, guitar
- Nimrod (1997) – lead vocals, guitar, harmonica on "Walking Alone"
- Warning (2000) – vocals, guitar, mandolin, harmonica
- American Idiot (2004) – lead and backing vocals, guitar
- 21st Century Breakdown (2009) – lead and backing vocals, guitar, piano
- American Idiot: The Original Broadway Cast Recording (2010) – vocals, guitar, piano
- ¡Uno! (2012) – vocals, guitar
- ¡Dos! (2012) – vocals, guitar
- ¡Tré! (2012) – vocals, guitar, piano
- Revolution Radio (2016) – lead vocals, guitar, piano
- Father of All Motherfuckers (2020) – lead vocals, guitar
- Saviors (2024) – lead vocals, guitar

=== Pinhead Gunpowder ===
Vocals and guitar on all

- Jump Salty (1994)
- Carry the Banner (1994)
- Goodbye Ellston Avenue (1997)
- Shoot the Moon (EP) (1999) – also production
- Compulsive Disclosure (2003)
- West Side Highway (EP) (2008)
- Unt (2024)

=== The Network ===
- Money Money 2020 (2003) – guitar, vocals
- Trans Am (2020)
- Money Money 2020 Part II: We Told Ya So! (2020) – lead vocals, lead guitar, backing vocals, drums

=== Foxboro Hot Tubs ===
- Stop Drop and Roll!!! (2008) – lead vocals

=== The Boo ===
- The Boo (EP) (2011) – bass

=== The Shrives ===
- Turn Me On (EP) (2015) – bass

=== The Longshot ===
- The Longshot (EP) (2018) – vocals, guitar, bass, drums
- Love Is for Losers (2018) – vocals, guitar, bass, drums
- Devil's Kind (Single) (2018) – vocals, guitar, bass, drums
- Bullets (Single) (2018) – vocals, guitar, bass, drums
- Razor Baby (EP) (2018) – vocals, guitar, bass, drums
- Return to Sender (EP) (2018) – vocals, guitar, bass, drums

== Filmography ==
=== Film ===
Year	Title	Role	Notes
2003	Riding in Vans with Boys	Himself	Documentary of The Pop Disaster Tour
2004	Disease Is Punishment	Fink	
2005	Bullet in a Bible	Himself	
2006	Live Freaky! Die Freaky!	Charles Manson	Voice
2007	The Simpsons Movie	Himself	Voice
2008	Heart Like a Hand Grenade	Himself	
2011	Awesome as Fuck	Himself	
2012	One Nine Nine Four	Himself	
2012	This Is 40	Himself	
2013	¡Cuatro!	Himself	
2013	Broadway Idiot	St. Jimmy	
2014	Like Sunday, Like Rain	Dennis	
2016	Ordinary World	Perry Miller	
2026	Nimrods	Himself	

=== Television ===
Year	Title	Role	Notes
1997	King of the Hill	Face	Voice; Episode: "The Man Who Shot Cane Skretteburg"
2001	Behind the Music	Himself	Episode: "Green Day"
2002	Haunted	Irv Kratser	Episode: "Simon Redux"
2010	Behind the Music: Remastered	Himself	Episode: "Green Day"
2012	Nurse Jackie	Jackie's Pickup	Episode: "Kettle-Kettle-Black-Black"
2012	The Voice	Himself	5 episodes
2016	Drunk History	Charlie Chaplin	Episode: "Legends"

=== Video games ===
Year	Title	Role	Notes
2005	Tony Hawk's American Wasteland	Himself	Likeness
2010	Green Day: Rock Band	Himself	Also likeness and archive footage

=== Stage ===
Year	Title	Role	Notes
2010–2011	American Idiot	St. Jimmy	76 performances
