= Aaron Cometbus =

American drummer

- Also known as: Cometbus
- Born: Aaron Elliott; May 20, 1968 (age 58); Berkeley, California, United States
- Origin: Berkeley, California, United States
- Genres: Punk rock; pop punk; alternative rock
- Occupations: Musician, author, songwriter, roadie magazine editor
- Years active: 1982–present
- Formerly of: Crimpshrine; Pinhead Gunpowder; Cleveland Bound Death Sentence; The Blank Fight; Sweet Baby; The Thorns of Life; Crybaby MacArthur; Screeching Weasel; Green Day; Harbinger

Aaron Elliott (born May 20, 1968), known professionally as Aaron Cometbus, is an American musician, author, songwriter, roadie, and magazine editor, best known as the creator of the punk zine Cometbus.

== Career ==
Born in Berkeley, California, Cometbus started writing fanzines in 1981 with Jesse Michaels (later of Operation Ivy and Common Rider) and started his own after Michaels moved to Pennsylvania in October 1981. He became an active participant in the Gilman Street Project and was a founding member of Crimpshrine, a highly influential East Bay punk rock band which also featured Jeff Ott. In a September 2016 interview Cometbus described how his personal life is not necessarily reflected in his zines stating, "Growing up, I was just really, really restless. I felt cooped up. Every band interview I did was about being on the road. When I finally got to cut loose, I went on three tours in two years, then had the band drop me off in the first city where I could find a room. So I'd made it out, but then came the news: my mom had cancer. I spent the next fifteen years going back and forth—caretaking first her and then my dad when they were doing badly, and when they were in remission, I'd get as far away as I could. When both were dead, I moved to New York, where I've lived ever since. That's my life, in a nutshell. Which answers your earlier question about how much the fanzine reflected my personal life. Not so much."

After the demise of Crimpshrine, Cometbus formed Pinhead Gunpowder with a handful of people from the East Bay punk scene, including Sarah Kirsch (later replaced by Jason White), Bill Schneider and Billie Joe Armstrong of Green Day. He toured as a roadie with Green Day for many years and played drums for a few shows after the departure of John Kiffmeyer; he was subsequently replaced by another temporary drummer, Dave "E.C." Henwood, before Tre Cool joined. He has played in a multitude of short-lived bands that generally release a seven-inch or two before breaking up. He is a co-owner of a used bookstore in Williamsburg, Brooklyn, called Book Thug Nation and a used bookstore in Bushwick called Human Relations, as well as Codex Books in NoHo, Lower Manhattan.

== Cometbus zine ==
Cometbus is most famous for publishing the zine Cometbus, which he began in Berkeley, California, in 1981. Cometbus has self-published the usually-handwritten zine ever since, despite a few breaks. The name Cometbus was coined by Gregg Turkington during the early days of the magazine when the name changed from issue to issue. Cometbus consisted of band interviews, personal diaries, artwork, and observations on the punk subculture in the San Francisco Bay Area and beyond. The zine captured a slice of life in Oakland and Berkeley from the late 1980s through the 1990s.

From 2004 to 2006, Cometbus took a hiatus from writing Cometbus to pursue publishing his writing through other channels. Cometbus came out of retirement in 2006 with the release of Cometbus #50, the 25th anniversary issue of the magazine. Originally planned as a letters only issue, it features band interviews (for the first time since issue #24), short stories, and book store reviews.

Cometbus #51, The Loneliness of the Electric Menorah, was released in September 2008. It chronicles the history of Moe's Books and other longtime businesses on Telegraph Avenue in Berkeley, California.

Cometbus #52, The Spirit of St-Louis, Or, How to Break Your Own Heart, A Tragedy in 24 Parts, was released in 2009. Cometbus says in his blurb: "It all starts with the story I've told so many times it's turned stale and tired from overuse. There I was, dropped off in a city far from home. I didn't know a soul or have a hope, and so on..." Both issue #52 of Cometbus and the novel I Wish There Was Something That I Could Quit are rumored to be about his stay and relationships in Pensacola, Florida.

Cometbus #53 features contributions from Maddalena Poletta and a cover by Eisner Award winner Nate Powell. Released in 2009, it features a lengthy piece on art, comics, and the early days of punk in NYC in the mid-1970s that is largely derived from an in-depth interview Cometbus conducted with John Holmstrom, the co-founder of the legendary Punk Magazine.

Cometbus #54, In China with Green Day?, released in February 2011, is about Cometbus' and Green Day's tour of Asia in 2010.

Cometbus #55, Pen Pals, was released in February 2013 (cover by Jordan Crane).

Cometbus #56, A Bestiary of Booksellers details the NYC used book trade.

Cometbus #57, 35th Anniversary Issue: Cartoonists (2016) interviews with comics creators Kim Deitch, Gary Panter, Al Jaffee, Drew Friedman, Ben Katchor, Paul Levitz, et al.

Cometbus #58, Zimmerwald (2017), is a novella about a teenager who "finds solace in a diner full of grumpy seniors during the heyday of San Francisco punk".

Cometbus #59: Post-Mortem (2020), a series of interviews about the punk scene.

The extremely limited print runs of the zine have been somewhat ameliorated over the years by a number of collections.

Despite Everything: A Cometbus Omnibus (Last Gasp Publishing 2002, ISBN 0-86719-561-4) a 608-page compendium of selections from 43 early Cometbus issues which are long out of print and often difficult to find.

Double Duce (Last Gasp Publishing 2003; ISBN 0-86719-586-X) a novel based on life in a punk house called Double Duce that collects material from issues 32, 35, 37, 38, 41, 42, 43, and 45.

Add Toner (Last Gasp Publishing 2011, ISBN 978-0-86719-753-2) compiles issues 44, 45, 46, 46 1/2, 47 & 48 in full, along with a collection of stories entitled "8 out of 10 days" .

== Other writing ==
In addition to writing for his own zine, Cometbus has contributed stories to several other zines such as Absolutely Zippo, Maximumrocknroll, and Tales of Blarg, occasionally writing under the pseudonym Skrub. His work is easily recognizable by his distinctive, block-lettered handwritten script. His handwriting also appears in the liner notes of early Green Day albums and Jawbreaker's Etc. compilation.

A novel titled I Wish There Was Something That I Could Quit, was published on March 15, 2006. This novel was loosely based on his experiences in Pensacola during the start of the Iraq War and is arguably his most political work. He released a few smaller collections of short stories, Mixed Reviews and Chicago Stories (self published, 2004), a small collection about Chicago originally published in "Cometbus" issues 35, 37, 38, 41, and 45.

Cometbus also released a book of poetry entitled Last Supper in 2014 through ARP Books.

Two collections have been translated into French, including En dépit de tout (1997). A French version of Cometbus issue 54, titled En Chine avec Green Day, has also been published by Editions Chat Chuffit in 2013. Double Duce has been translated into German and was published by Lautsprecherverlag as Doppelzwei in 2004.

=== Discography ===
Crimpshrine

- Lame Gig Contest (1989)

Extended plays

- Sleep, What's That? (1988)
- Quit Talkin' Claude (1989)

Compilation albums

- Duct Tape Soup (1992)
- The Sound of a New World Being Born (1998)

Split albums

- Crimpshrine / Mutley Chix (1988)
- Crimpshrine / G-Whiz (1989)
- Jawbreaker / Crimpshrine (1993)

Other appearances

- "Another Day", "Rearranged" on Turn It Around! – Maximumrocknroll (1987)
- "Trying Too Hard", "Construction", "Sanctuary" on Caution – Skene! Records (1988)
- "Pick Up the Pieces" on The World's in Shreds: Volume 1 – Shredder Records (1988)
- "Pretty Mess" on The World's in Shreds: Volume 2 – Shredder Records (1989)
- "Summertime" on The Thing That Ate Floyd – Lookout! Records (1989)
- "I Just Don't Know" on Bay Mud – Very Small Records (1989)
- "Rearranged" on Lethal Noise, Vol. 2 – Very Small Records (1989)
- "Free Will" on Make the Collector Nerd Sweat – Very Small Records (1990)

== Band history ==
- S.A.G. (East Bay CA; 1982–1984)
- Crimpshrine (East Bay CA; 1984–1989)
- Screeching Weasel (Chicago, IL; 1988 (two shows))
- Sweet Baby (a.k.a. Sweet Baby Jesus) (East Bay/Northern CA; 1989–1990)
- Pinhead Gunpowder (East Bay CA; 1990–present)
- Green Day (East Bay CA; 1990)
- Mundt (Olympia, WA; 1992)
- Strawman (San Francisco, CA; 1993?)
- Shotwell Coho (San Francisco CA; a.k.a. Shotwell Coho) (1994)
- EFS (Berkeley CA; 1995)
- Cosmetic Puffs (Eureka, CA; 1995)
- Redmond Shooting Stars (Eugene, OR; 1995–1996)
- Cleveland Bound Death Sentence (Minneapolis MN; 1997–1998; 2004)
- The Retard Beaters (Chattanooga, TN; 1997–1998)
- Harbinger (with Robert Eggplant, formerly of Blatz, and John Geek of Fleshies) (East Bay CA; 1997–2001, 2010)
- The Blank Fight (with Rymodee of This Bike Is a Pipe Bomb) (Pensacola, FL; 1999–2000)
- Astrid Oto (Asheville NC; 1999–2001)
- Colbom (San Francisco CA; 2001)
- End of the World News (New York; 2002–2003)
- Crybaby MacArthur (Brooklyn NY; 2004–2006)
- The Thorns of Life (Brooklyn NY; 2008–2009)
- Sub Rosa (Brooklyn NY; 2020-2022)

== See also ==
- Lillian Wolock Elliott – Cometbus' mother, a textile artist
