= Stop Drop and Roll!!! =

Studio album by Foxboro Hot Tubs
- Released: April 22, 2008
- Recorded: December 2007
- Studio: Jingletown Studios in Oakland, California
- Genre: Garage rock, rock and roll
- Length: 32:37
- Label: Jingle Town, Warner Music
- Producer: Chris Dugan

Singles from Stop Drop and Roll!!!
- 1. "Mother Mary" Released: January 2008; 2. "The Pedestrian" Released: April 1, 2008; 3. "Stop Drop and Roll" Released: December 2008

Professional ratings
Review scores
Source	Rating
AllMusic	4.5/5 stars
Punknews.org	3.5/5 stars
Rolling Stone	3/5 stars

Stop Drop and Roll!!! is the debut studio album by the American rock band the Foxboro Hot Tubs. The full album was first available for digital download on April 22, 2008, and was released on CD on May 20, 2008. The title track "Stop Drop and Roll" was featured in the 2010 American comedy film Get Him to the Greek, although it was not on the soundtrack album.

The album sold 19,000 copies in its first week of availability in the US, and went on to sell over 55,000 copies there.

== Background and recording ==
The album was recorded while Green Day were writing their eighth studio album 21st Century Breakdown; they ended up recording this album because they "love to play music and be spontaneous, and after a few late night jams and a few too many bottles of wine, we were inspired to record some rockin' eight-track recordings".

Initially the band made five tracks from the album available as a free EP download on the band's website which included a song that was omitted from the album, "Highway 1" (this song was replaced on the album with a song called "Broadway"). On this EP, there were samples included at the beginning of the songs:

- "Stop Drop and Roll" features a quote from the 1966 film Who's Afraid of Virginia Woolf?
- "Mother Mary" features French language from an unknown source.
- "Ruby Room" features a quote from the 1970 film "Beyond the Valley of the Dolls".
- "Red Tide" features a quote from a radio advertisement for the Ventures' 1969 album Underground Fire.
- "Highway 1" features a clip from The Troggs Tapes.
- "She's a Saint Not a Celebrity" also features a quote from Who's Afraid of Virginia Woolf?

These samples were removed from the album's official release and the free download is no longer available.

== Cover art and packaging ==
The original album art shown on the band's official website in December 2007 was updated for its full release in 2008. Changes included updating "6 songs" to "12 songs" and replacing "Highway 1" as mentioned on the cover with "Mother Mary", which was the first official single from the album and released to radio in 2008. The images features on the album were also rearranged.

The physical album release comes with the CD in a cardboard sleeve reminiscent of vinyl records, with the CD face resembling a vinyl record. The CD face also came with a humorous message that said "Warning: Do Not Play Side B". The album is also referred to as having a "Side A" and "Side B" like vinyl-era albums. The vinyl edition included a free CD version of the album.

== Track listing ==
All tracks are written by Foxboro Hot Tubs.

Side A
No.	Title	Length
1.	"Stop Drop and Roll"	2:23
2.	"Mother Mary"	2:46
3.	"Ruby Room"	2:01
4.	"Red Tide"	2:58
5.	"Broadway"	3:30
6.	"She's a Saint Not a Celebrity"	2:26

Side B
No.	Title	Length
1.	"Sally"	3:02
2.	"Alligator"	2:25
3.	"The Pedestrian"	2:15
4.	"27th Ave. Shuffle"	2:50
5.	"Dark Side of Night"	2:57
6.	"Pieces of Truth"	3:04

== Personnel ==
- Reverend Strychnine Twitch – lead vocals
- Mike Dirnt – bass guitar, backing vocals
- Tré Cool – drums, percussion, backing vocals
- Frosco Lee – lead guitar, backing vocals
- Jason Freese – keyboard, saxophone, flute, backing vocals
- Kevin Preston – rhythm guitar, backing vocals

Production

- Chris Dugan – recording, mixing on a 1/4" 8 track ("Dark Side of Night" recorded on a 4 track)
- Ken Lee – mastering
- Jason Chandler – artwork

== Charts ==
Chart performance of Stop Drop and Roll!!!
Chart (2008)	Peak position
German Albums (Offizielle Top 100)	58
Swedish Albums (Sverigetopplistan)	58
Swiss Albums (Schweizer Hitparade)	73
UK Albums (OCC)	37
US Billboard 200	21
