= Mother Mary (song) =

Single by Foxboro Hot Tubs

from the album Stop Drop and Roll!!!
- B-side: "She's a Saint Not a Celebrity"
- Released: 2008
- Recorded: 2007–2008 at Jingle Town Studios in Oakland, CA
- Length: 2:46
- Label: Jingle Town Records
- Songwriters: Reverend Strychnine Twitch; Mike Dirnt; Tré Cool; Frosco Lee; Jason Freese; Kevin Preston

Foxboro Hot Tubs singles chronology
"Mother Mary" (2008)	"The Pedestrian" (2008)

Music video
- "Mother Mary" on YouTube

"Mother Mary" is a song by the American rock band Foxboro Hot Tubs from their 2008 album, Stop Drop and Roll!!! The single peaked at No. 16 on the Billboard Hot Modern Rock Tracks chart.

== Track listing ==
45rpm Vinyl

Side A

1. "Mother Mary" – 2:46

Side B

1. "She's a Saint Not a Celebrity" – 2:57
