= Monsula =

American punk rock band

- Origin: San Francisco Bay Area, California, U.S.
- Genres: Emo, pop-punk
- Years active: 1988–1993
- Past members: Paul Lee; Pete Zetterberg; Mikey Mischief; Charles Goshert; Mike Talbot –; Todd Sweatfield; Skot Pelkey; Paul Curran; Bill Schneider; Jeffrey Stofan; Jason White; Lance Hahn

Monsula was an American punk rock band from the San Francisco Bay Area, California, United States. The band was conceived in 1988 by Pete Zetterberg and Paul Lee in an art class at Benicia High School. With many member changes over the years, they performed regularly at Berkeley's Gilman Street Project and were known for their simple East Bay pop punk style of music. The band played hundreds of live shows throughout North America before disbanding five years later in 1993.

== Band members ==
- Paul Lee – vocalist, lyricist 1988-1993 (Saint James Infirmary)
- Pete Zetterberg – (Stone Grove, Black Tooth Mountain) guitar 1988
- Mikey Mischief – drums 1989-1990 (Fifteen)
- Charles Goshert – guitar 1989-1992 (Poultry Magic)
- Mike Talbot – bass 1989 (Delightful Little Nothings)
- Todd Sweatfield – bass 1989
- Skot Pelkey – drums 1989-1991 (Uranium 9-Volt)
- Paul Curran – bass 1989-1990 (Crimpshrine)
- Bill Schneider – bass 1990-1993 (Pinhead Gunpowder)
- Jeffrey Stofan – drums 1991-1993 (Fuel)
- Jason White – guitar 1992-1993 (Pinhead Gunpowder, Green Day, Foxboro Hot Tubs, The Network)
- Lance Hahn – guitar 1992-1993 (Cringer, J Church)

== Discography ==
- If you can see through it, it ain't coffee a four-song 7" compilation released in 1990 on Very Small Records also featuring Filth, Fuel and Thumper with one song contributed by each band.
- nickel e.p. a four-song 7" released on Lookout! Records No. 27, 1990. With insert artwork by Aaron Cometbus.
- Structure an LP released on Lookout! Records No. 38, 1991.
- Sanitized an LP released on Lookout! Records No. 55, 1992.

== Sources ==
- monsula
- Remember Monsula?
- The Green Day Authority
- Aaron Cometbus interviewed on WFMU
