= Let Yourself Go (Green Day song) =

Single by Green Day

from the album ¡Uno!
- Released: September 5, 2012
- Recorded: 2012 at Jingletown Studios in Oakland, California
- Genre: Punk rock
- Length: 2:57
- Label: Reprise; Warner Bros.
- Songwriters: Billie Joe Armstrong; Mike Dirnt; Tré Cool
- Producers: Rob Cavallo; Green Day

Green Day singles chronology
"Kill the DJ" (2012)	"Let Yourself Go" (2012)	"Stray Heart" (2012)

Music video
- "Let Yourself Go on YouTube

"Let Yourself Go" is a song by American rock band Green Day. The song is featured as the fourth track on their ninth studio album, ¡Uno! (2012). Written by Billie Joe Armstrong and produced by Rob Cavallo, the song was released as the third and final single from the album on September 5, 2012. However, the "official live video" of the song was revealed on August 1, 2012. It is also the third single from the ¡Uno!, ¡Dos! ¡Tré! trilogy.

The song was described to be "more punk" than that of the band's previous two singles "Oh Love" and "Kill the DJ", and was compared to their 1990s material, such as Dookie and Insomniac. Its theme was described as "the kind of pop-smart here's-my-fucking-problem miniatures". It received positive critical reception and charted at number 2 on the UK Rock Chart and 17 on the US Alternative Songs chart. "Let Yourself Go" was played at secret shows of the band and at the 2012 MTV Video Music Awards.

== Recording and release ==
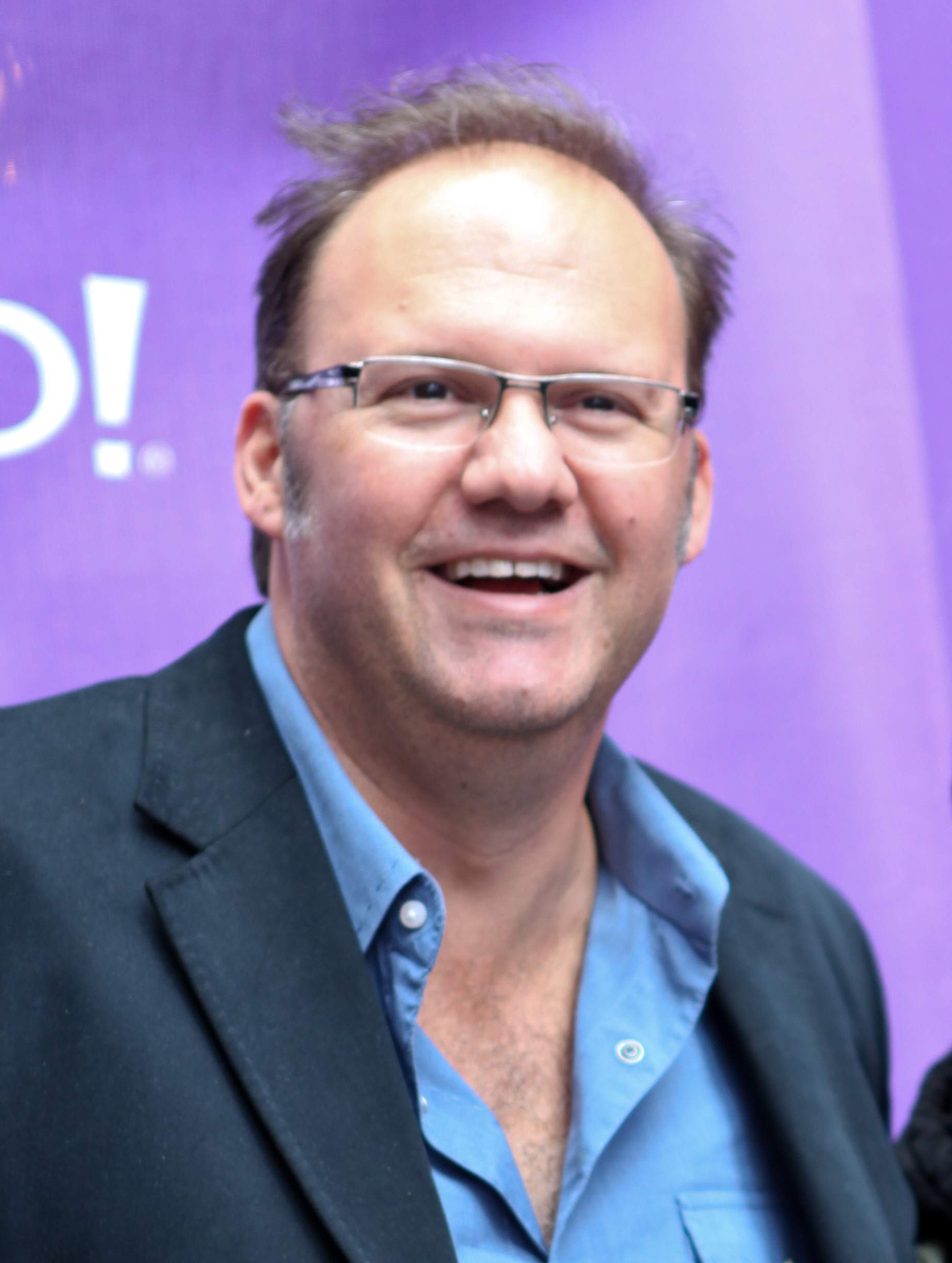
Rob Cavallo produced the song with Green Day

After "Let Yourself Go" was played at a 'secret New York Halloween show' of the band on October 27, 2011, Green Day began recording new material for ¡Uno! on February 14, 2012, and the song was confirmed with the revelation of the track listing of ¡Uno! on June 26, 2012.

Followed by the release of the "official live video" for "Let Yourself Go" on August 1, 2012, recorded during their performance at Austin, Texas. it was released as a single on September 5, 2012. The song was written by Billie Joe Armstrong and produced by the band along with their long time collaborator Rob Cavallo.

The song debuted on the US Rock Songs and US Alternative Songs at numbers 36 and 34 respectively, peaking at number 29 on the US Rock chart and number 17 on the Alternative Songs chart. "Let Yourself Go" reached number 2 on the UK Rock Chart, and peaked at number 99 on the Dutch Single Top 100 and number 49 on the South Korean Gaon Chart.

== Theme and composition ==
"Let Yourself Go"
The sample contains an 17s guitar-based melody and main chorus, described as a "straightforward punk anthem"

"Let Yourself Go" was described as a return to punk rock in contrast to the band's previous two singles "Oh Love" and "Kill the DJ" by VH1's Zara Golden. The song was stylistically compared to their 1990s roots with a tone and style that imitates the band's work from Dookie and Insomniac. Slant Magazine had said that it also reflects the style of Van Halen from the 1980s.

David Fricke of the Rolling Stone in a review of ¡Uno! compared the theme of the song with "Stay the Night", another song on the album, stating; "'Stay the Night' and 'Let Yourself Go' are the kind of pop-smart here's-my-fucking-problem miniatures Armstrong was writing like second nature when he, Dirnt and Cool were too young to drink (legally) where they gigged. But Armstrong is 40 now, married and a dad, and a lot of this ruckus sounds designed to drown out the time bombs ticking in his head and the maddening static outside".

== Critical reception ==
The song received positive reception from the critics, mainly focusing on the song's references to Green Day's stylistic origins. Erica Futterman of Rolling Stone praised the song, describing it as a "blistering [and] Ramones-tinged [song]". Katie Hasty of HitFix added to the song's familiarity, stating "It's back to the melodic, snotty sound of early Green Day, with some spit shine and a few f-bombs." At The Reporter, Stephen Moore described that the song was a "rant and snarl encouragingly" in which "[Cool's] rapid-fire drumming [was] conjuring up some of the Dookie magic".

Greg Kot of the Chicago Tribune stated that the song was "undeniably sharp, [and] catchy" which was "hurtling on a wave of harmony vocals". Yorgo Douramacos at Slant Magazine noted it as an "occasional guitar solo" and further added that the song "steers a straightforward punk anthem toward early-'80s Van Halen territory". Randall Roberts from the Los Angeles Times described the song to be an "obvious chart-buster" and added that it would "no doubt be used to back NFL highlight reels for years to come." Scott Heisel from Alternative Press cited the song to be the fastest on the album by observing with "breaking 200 bpms and creating an instant sing-along with perfectly placed profanity. It's destined to become a live staple."

== Live performances ==
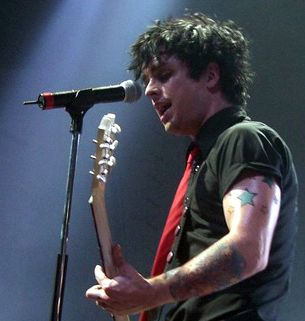
Armstrong was hospitalized three days before the band's performance at VMA.

Green Day played a secret-show in Costa Mesa, California on August 11, 2011, where they performed various songs from the upcoming album, including "Let Yourself Go". Later on, the song was also played at few other secret shows of the band. A recording of the band performing the song live at Red 7 in Austin, Texas on November 17, 2011 was released online on July 30, 2012 as the "official live video" for the song.

The band was touring in Italy five days prior to their performance at the 2012 MTV Video Music Awards. Lead singer Billie Joe Armstrong was hospitalized due to dehydration and influenza. This caused the band to cancel their show at Bologna which was scheduled three days before their performance at the VMAs. However, Armstrong recovered and the band performed "Let Yourself Go" at the VMAs.

== Credits and personnel ==
- Songwriting: Billie Joe Armstrong, Mike Dirnt, Tré Cool
- Production: Rob Cavallo, Green Day

== Charts ==
=== Weekly charts ===
Weekly chart performance for "Let Yourself Go"
Chart (2012–2013)	Peak position
Canada Rock (Billboard)	9
Italy (FIMI)	57
Netherlands (Single Top 100)	99
South Korea (Gaon Chart)	49
UK Rock & Metal (OCC)	2
US Hot Rock & Alternative Songs (Billboard)	29
US Rock & Alternative Airplay (Billboard)	13

=== Year-end charts ===
Year-end chart performance "Let Yourself Go"
Chart (2012)	Position
US Hot Rock & Alternative Songs (Billboard)	91
