= Jason White (Green Day guitarist) =

American guitarist

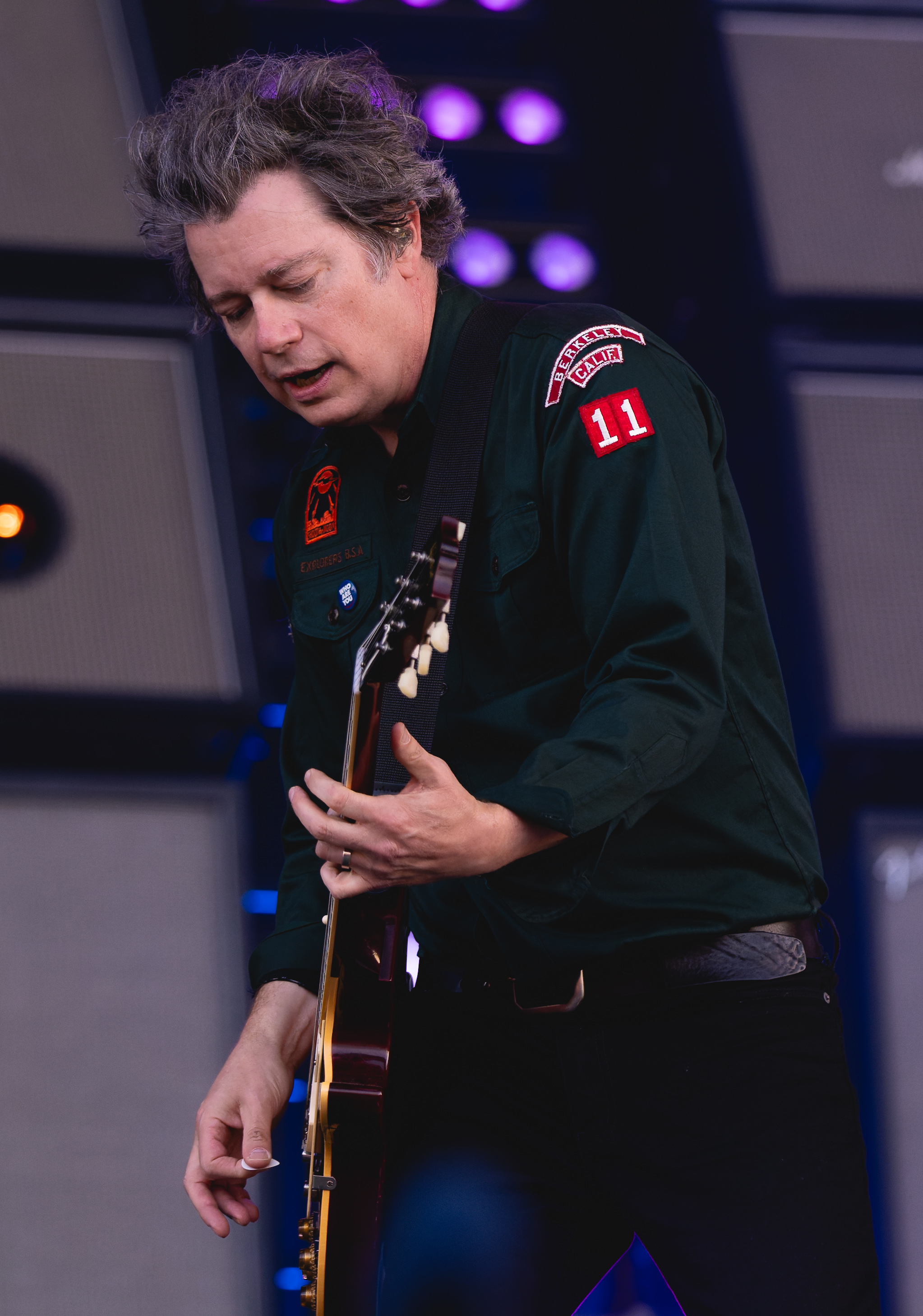
- White performing with Green Day in 2024

Background information
- Also known as: Balducci; Frosco Lee
- Born: November 11, 1973 (age 52); North Little Rock, Arkansas, U.S.
- Genres: Punk rock; pop-punk; alternative rock; new wave; garage rock
- Occupation: Musician
- Instruments: Guitar; vocals; bass
- Years active: 1990s–present
- Member of: Green Day; Pinhead Gunpowder; The Network; Foxboro Hot Tubs; The Coverups; The Big Cats
- Formerly of: The Influents; Chino Horde; Fishwagon; Step by Step; Numbskulz; Sixteen Bullets; Monsula; Pretty; The Kicks; California
- Spouse: Janna Rollins (m. 2005)

Jason White (born November 11, 1973) is an American musician, best known for being the touring guitarist of the rock band Green Day, with whom he has performed since 1999. He has worked with the band in the studio and on tour, and has appeared in various music videos with the band, including "When I Come Around", "Wake Me Up When September Ends", "21 Guns", "Last of the American Girls", "Kill the DJ", "Nuclear Family", "Stay the Night", and "Dilemma". He joined the group in the studio as a session member for the band’s 2012 trilogy, ¡Uno!, ¡Dos!, and ¡Tré!. Aside from working with Green Day, White is a member of the punk band Pinhead Gunpowder, which also features Green Day vocalist Billie Joe Armstrong. White has also been a member of a number of Green Day side projects, including, among others, Foxboro Hot Tubs, the Network, and the Coverups.

== Career ==
=== Other musical acts (1992–present) ===
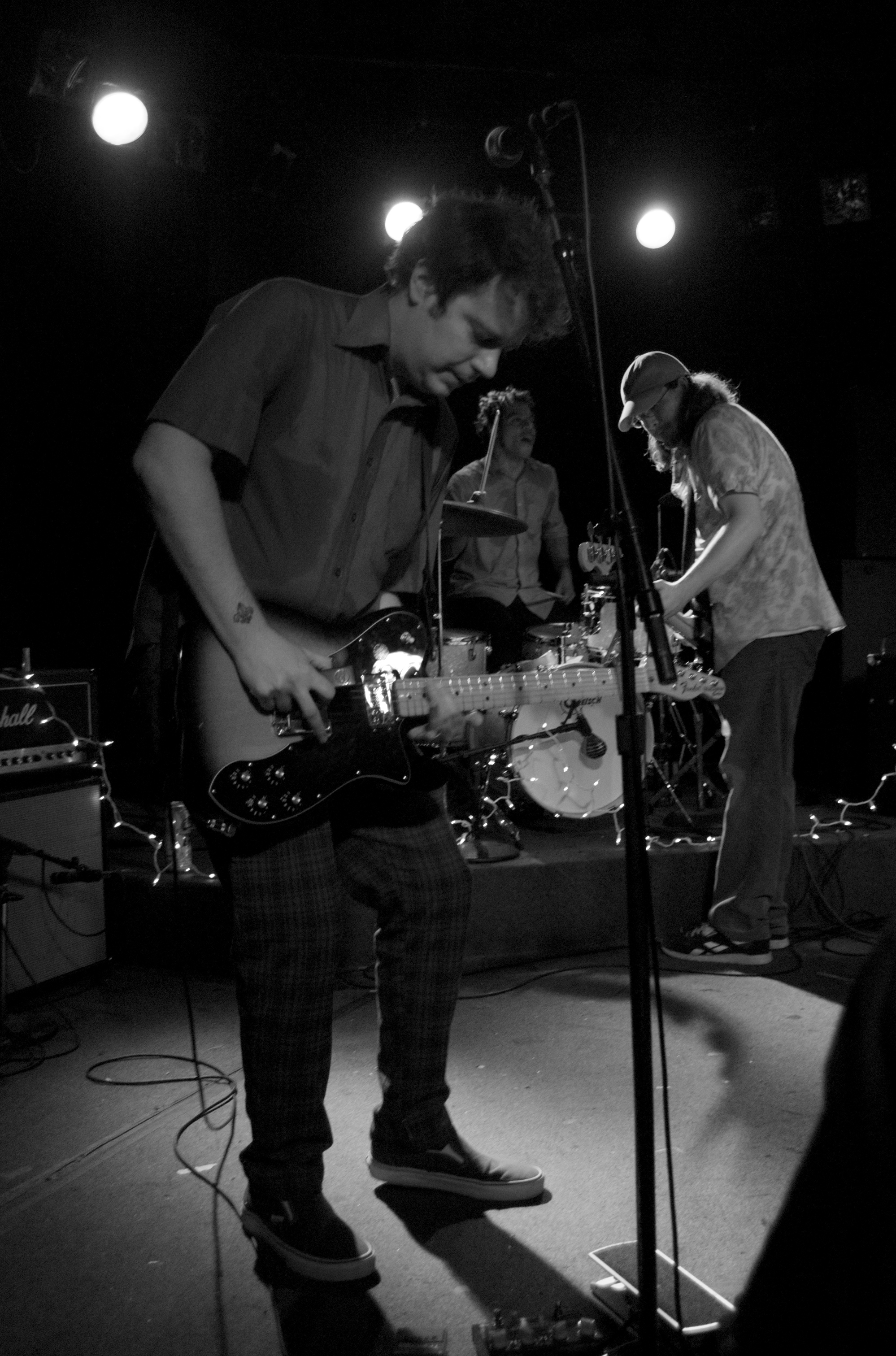
White performs with The Big Cats

In the summer of 1992, White filled in guitar duties at the last minute for Bay Area punk band Monsula, who were performing at Little Rock, AR club Vino's. After the performance, Jason toured as guitarist for the band and eventually relocated to the Bay Area after the breakup of Chino Horde in summer 1993. White joined the Big Cats in 1996, after the temporary departure of bassist Josh Bentley, and took over guitar duties in 2000 after the death of guitarist Shannon Yarbrough. The group is a side project of many musicians, playing live very rarely. Their newest record, On Tomorrow, was released in 2007.

Because of Pinhead Gunpowder's infamy for sporadic get-togethers, White and Gunpowder bassist Bill Schneider began looking to form another band that would be a group the two could focus on. After recruiting Schneider's brother Greg Schneider to join and finally convincing Willie Samuels to play drums, the Influents were formed. White and Greg would become the focus of the band, splitting songwriting duties, as well as singing time. Bill Schneider left the band on good terms after the group's first album Check Please to focus on his drum shop and was soon replaced by Johnnie Wentz. The new line-up soon recorded a follow-up, Some of the Young, and went on tour.

In 2006, Jason recorded a cover of the Replacements' "Torture" for the Replacements Cover compilation, "We'll Inherit the Earth". He was also featured in the May 2007 release, Towncraft, a documentary covering twenty years of the punk music scene in Little Rock, AR, White's home. That same year, White played with Green Day in the video for the cover of "Working Class Hero".

=== Green Day and related work ===
In 2008, White joined Green Day's side project Foxboro Hot Tubs as lead guitarist along with Kevin Preston of Prima Donna on rhythm guitar. In 2009, he toured with Green Day in support for their latest record, 21st Century Breakdown. White made his fourth appearance on a Green Day video for "21 Guns" and his fifth in "Last of the American Girls"; prior to this, and not including his live appearances on "Jesus of Suburbia" and "East Jesus Nowhere", he had appeared in three videos: "When I Come Around", "Wake Me Up When September Ends", and "Working Class Hero".

On July 13, 2010, Max Recordings released White's debut 45 single—"Hungover" b/w "I'm a Mess". He appeared once again as Green Day's sideman for their 2011 live album Awesome as Fuck. White played guitar on the song "Back in the USA" on Green Day's 2017 compilation Greatest Hits: God's Favorite Band as an additional musician.

==== Green Day membership ====
A common belief among fans is that White became an official member of Green Day in 2012 with the release of the ¡Uno!, ¡Dos!, and ¡Tré! trilogy, and reverted by his own accord to being a touring member before the release of the group’s 2016 album Revolution Radio. White himself has stated that he recorded on the trilogy as a session musician because the band wanted a more "live" sound to the albums, and that he was never a full band member.

== Personal life ==
In 2005, White married Janna Rollins. Their first child, Sonny, was born on January 29, 2013, and their daughter, Shelby, was born May 29, 2014.

In late 2014, he was diagnosed with tonsil cancer, which has since been treated.

== Discography ==
=== Green Day ===
- Tune In, Tokyo... (2001)
- Bullet in a Bible (2005)
- 21 Guns (Live EP) (2009)
- Last Night on Earth: Live in Tokyo (2009)
- Awesome as Fuck (2011)
- ¡Uno! (2012)
- ¡Dos! (2012)
- ¡Tré! (2012)
- Demolicious (2014)
- Back in the USA from Greatest Hits: God's Favorite Band (2017)

=== Pinhead Gunpowder ===
- Carry the Banner (1994)
- Goodbye Ellston Avenue (1997)
- Shoot the Moon (EP) (1999)
- Compulsive Disclosure (2003)
- West Side Highway (EP) (2008)
- Unt (2024)

=== The Network ===
- Money Money 2020 (2003)
- Trans Am (2020)
- Money Money 2020 Part II: We Told Ya So! (2020)

=== Foxboro Hot Tubs ===
- Stop Drop and Roll!!! (2008)

=== Jason White's California/California ===
- California (2016)

== Associated acts ==
- Numbskulz (guitar, 1988)
- Step by Step (vocals, 1989–1990)
- Chino Horde (bass, 1990–1993)
- Fishwagon (guitar/vocals, 1991)
- Monsula (guitar, 1992–1993)
- Sixteen Bullets (bass, 1994)
- Pinhead Gunpowder (guitar/vocals, 1995–present)
- The Big Cats (vocals, 1996–1997, 2000–present; bass, 1996–1997; guitar, 2000–present)
- The Influents (guitar/vocals, 1999–2003)
- The Network (credited as Balducci, rhythm guitar, backing vocals, 2003–2005, 2020–2021)
- Foxboro Hot Tubs (credited as Frosco Lee, lead guitar, backing vocals, 2007–present)
- Green Day (guitar, backing vocals: 1999–present (touring member); 2012 (studio member)
- California (guitar/vocals, 2014–present)
- The Coverups (guitar/vocals, 2018–present)
