= ¡Uno! =

Studio album by Green Day
- Released: September 21, 2012
- Recorded: 2012
- Studios: Jingletown Recording, Oakland, California
- Genres: Power pop; pop-punk; punk rock
- Length: 41:44
- Label: Reprise
- Producers: Rob Cavallo; Green Day

Green Day chronology
Oh Love E.P. (2012)	¡Uno! (2012)	¡Dos! (2012)

Green Day studio chronology
21st Century Breakdown (2009)	¡Uno! (2012)	¡Dos! (2012)

Singles from ¡Uno!
- 1. "Oh Love" Released: July 16, 2012; 2. "Kill the DJ" Released: August 14, 2012; 3. "Let Yourself Go" Released: September 5, 2012; 4. "Fell for You (Otis Mix)" Released: August 4, 2017

¡Uno! (stylized in all caps) is the ninth studio album by the American rock band Green Day, released first in Australia on September 21, 2012, and released in the US on September 25, 2012, by Reprise Records. It is the first of three albums in the ¡Uno!, ¡Dos!, ¡Tré! trilogy, a series of studio albums released from September 2012 to December 2012. Green Day recorded the album from February to June 2012 at Jingletown Studios in Oakland, California. This is the band's first album recorded as a quartet, as touring guitarist Jason White joined the band in the studio to give the studio recordings a more live feel.

Artwork of the album was revealed in a video uploaded to YouTube and the track list of the album, which consist of 12 songs was announced on June 26, 2012. The first single from the album, titled "Oh Love", was released on July 16, 2012. The second single "Kill the DJ" was released on European iTunes Stores on August 14, 2012. The third single "Let Yourself Go" was released on the US iTunes Store on September 5, 2012, and a promotional single "Nuclear Family" was released on their YouTube channel on September 12, 2012. A music video for "Stay the Night" was released on Rolling Stone and their YouTube channel on September 24, 2012.

¡Uno! received generally positive reviews from music critics. It debuted at number two on the US Billboard 200 with first-week sales of 139,000 copies. The album also reached the top 10 of charts in numerous other countries.

== Background and recording ==
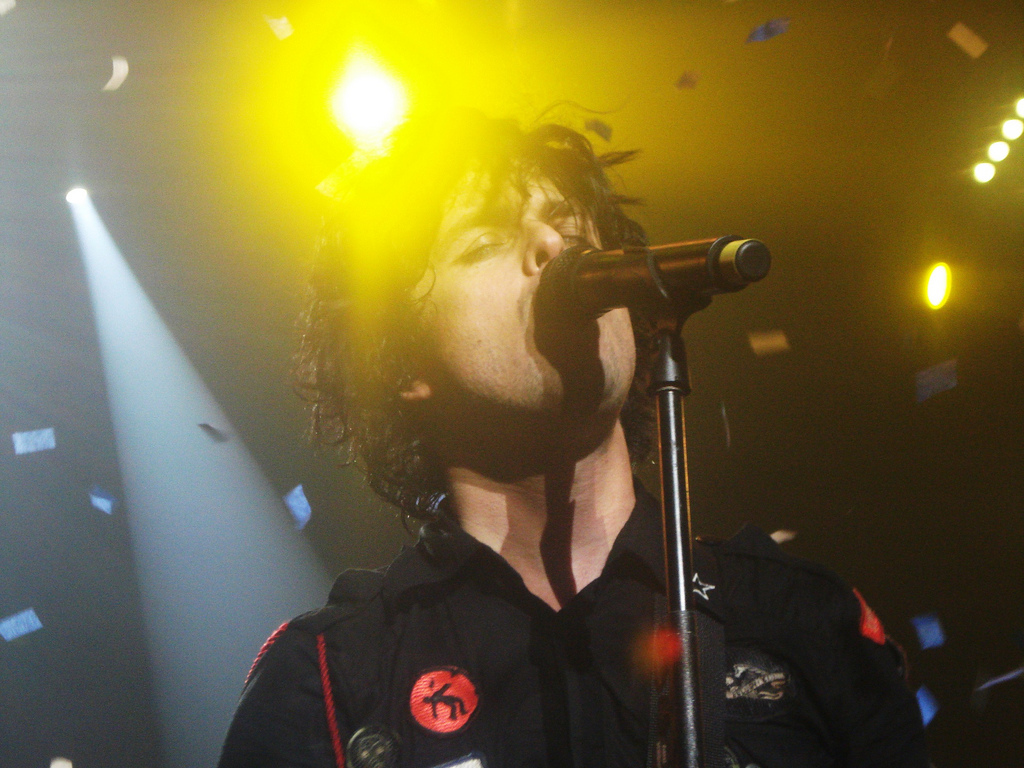
Lead singer and guitarist Billie Joe Armstrong wrote all of the album's lyrics.

In February 2012, Billie Joe Armstrong announced that the band was in the studio, recording material for a new album. In the statement, he said, "We are at the most prolific and creative time in our lives ... This is the best music we've ever written, and the songs just keep coming. Instead of making one album, we are making a three album trilogy. Every song has the power and energy that represents Green Day on all emotional levels. We just can't help ourselves ... We are going epic as fuck!"

The band started work by rehearsing every other day and making songs. They recorded the album at Jingletown Studios in Oakland, California. The band recorded 37 songs and initially thought of making a double album. Armstrong suggested making a trilogy of albums like Van Halen's Van Halen I (1978), Van Halen II (1979), and Van Halen III (1998). He stated in an interview, "The songs just kept coming, kept coming. I'd go, Maybe a double album? No, that's too much nowadays. Then more songs kept coming. And one day, I sprung it on the others: 'Instead of Van Halen I, II and III, what if it's Green Day I, II and III and we all have our faces on each cover?'"

== Writing and composition ==
In an interview to Rolling Stone, Armstrong stated that the theme of ¡Uno! would be different from that of American Idiot (2004), and 21st Century Breakdown (2009), and would not be a third rock opera. He added that music on the record would be "punchier, more power pop – somewhere between AC/DC and the early Beatles" than the band's previous albums. He also stated that a few songs on the album would also sound like garage rock and dance music. According to Armstrong, the song "Kill the DJ" was "straight-up dance music" and "four-on-the-floor rhythm", which the band has never done before.

According to music critic David Fricke, ¡Uno! is a power pop album less polemic and conceptual than American Idiot or 21st Century Breakdown, and Stephen Thomas Erlewine said that its music is exclusively power pop and three-chord rock songs. It was also characterized as pop punk by Scott Kara of The New Zealand Herald and Robert Cooke of The Fly, while Scott Heisel of the Alternative Press said that ¡Uno! is a punk rock album. Annie Zaleski of Las Vegas Weekly labeled it as both a pop-punk and pop record.

== Release and promotion ==
In April 2012, Green Day announced through a press release it would be releasing a trilogy of albums titled ¡Uno!, ¡Dos!, and ¡Tré! and stated that they would be released on September 25, 2012, November 13, 2012, and January 15, 2013 (later moved up to December 11, 2012), respectively, through Reprise Records. ¡Uno!, the first album from the trilogy, was released on September 24, 2012, in the United Kingdom and on September 25 in the United States.

=== Singles ===
"Oh Love", was released as the first single from ¡Uno!. It was released as the lead single on July 16, 2012. Upon its release as the lead song, "Oh Love" debuted on multiple world charts. The song made its debut at number one on the US Rock Songs with 13 million audience impressions at 145 reporting stations. The song is the band's first to debut at number one on the charts and the third song ever to debut at number one on the Rock Songs chart, following Linkin Park's "The Catalyst" and Foo Fighters' "Rope" which made their debuts at number one on August 21, 2010, and March 12, 2011, respectively. It also reached No. 3 on the US Alternative Songs.

"Kill the DJ" was released as the second single from the album in Europe and Oceania on August 14, 2012. The single premiered on Zane Lowe's show on BBC Radio 1 in the UK the day before its release. The next day, the single was made available on the iTunes Store.

"Let Yourself Go" was released as the third single from ¡Uno! on September 5, 2012. The song was performed live at the MTV Video Music Awards on September 6, 2012. It charted at No. 2 on the UK Rock Chart.

"Nuclear Family" was released as a promotional single in conjunction with Yahoo! and Spotify on September 11, 2012. The song was made available to stream for free through Spotify. A video for the song featuring the band playing it in a studio debuted on Yahoo! Music and the band's official YouTube channel the same day. A similar video of the band performing "Stay the Night" was released on Rolling Stone's website on September 23, 2012. The video is included with the deluxe edition of ¡Uno! on iTunes. On October 6, the band uploaded the video of them performing "Troublemaker".

On August 4, 2017, Green Day issued a re-released version of "Fell for You" called "Fell for You (Otis Mix)", which amplified specific instrumental elements of the original song.

== Critical reception ==
Professional ratings
Aggregate scores
Source	Rating
Metacritic	67/100
Review scores
Source	Rating
AllMusic	3.5/5 stars
The A.V. Club	B−
Entertainment Weekly	B
The Guardian	3/5 stars
Mojo	4/5 stars
NME	6/10
Q	3/5 stars
Rolling Stone	4/5 stars
Slant Magazine	3/5 stars
Spin	7/10

¡Uno! received generally positive reviews from contemporary music critics. At Metacritic, which assigns a normalized rating out of 100 to reviews from mainstream critics, the album received an average score of 67, based on 32 reviews. In his review for Rolling Stone, David Fricke complimented the album's "12 blasts of hook-savvy mosh-pit pop" and found it to be a "plain relief" after the "weight and worry" of the band's previous two albums, observing "a hipper, richer grip in the details." Melissa Maerz of Entertainment Weekly called the album "a welcome switch from high concept to high energy." Kerrang! magazine called it "a sharp and often exhilarating change of gear from the Green Day of the past eight years." BBC Music's Ian Winwood called it "a work of masterfully controlled music." Mojo recommended it to fans of the band's 1994 album Dookie and stated, "your favourite slacker-punks are, briefly, back." Scott Heisel of Alternative Press praised its "loud, fast, catchy-as-fuck punk rock" and wrote that its "stripped down instrumentation" and "more direct lyrics" are "mutually beneficial." Jason Heller of The A.V. Club commented that "filler abounds, and it doesn't land with quite as much delirious abandon as it once did, but Armstrong's power-pop impulse can still pack a face-splitting punch." AllMusic editor Stephen Thomas Erlewine felt that its "big, crisp, and clean" sound "undercuts some of the punkiness of Green Day's intentions", but complimented their "attack" as "precise" and wrote that the "huge" hooks "gleefully bludgeon doubters into blissful submission."

In a mixed review, Ed Power of Hot Press observed "over-familiarity" and "less to say on Uno" than on the band's previous work, stating, "they are doing what they do best. Nothing less, but certainly nothing more." Dave Simpson of The Guardian called ¡Uno! "a very decent fist of sounding like their twentysomething selves", but wrote that "the pace doesn't vary and the recent social commentary ... has given way to more teenage concerns". Slant Magazine's Yorgo Douramacos called the album "fairly strong", but felt that the songs "sound like only slightly altered versions of previous entries in the Green Day catalogue." In a negative review, Andy Gill of The Independent panned "Green Day's devotion to the most basic of rock formats" and called the music "patronising corporate rock masquerading, in sweary adolescent anthems as somehow anti-establishment." Randall Roberts of the Los Angeles Times asserted that the album was too "typical" and "commercial" to be a punk album, writing that it "feels like the work of a band that has painted itself into an aesthetic corner." Paul Mardles of The Observer criticized the album as "largely throwaway, its frenzied, phlegm-flecked songs littered with sentiments ... that sound daft coming from a 40-year-old frontman." Greg Kot of the Chicago Tribune was ambivalent towards its "back-to-basics" approach and perceived a lack of "memorable lyric[s]". Barry Nicolson of NME found the album more comparable to "the three albums that followed" Dookie, noting "highs that prove unsustainable, and lows that hope you're too adrenalised to notice." Rolling Stone ranked it number eight on their year-end top albums list for 2012. Robert Christgau later said in 2021 that the album had "sounded like more of the self-important same" and diminished his interest in the band's subsequent work.

== Commercial performance ==
The album debuted at number two on the US Billboard 200 chart, selling 139,000 copies in its first week. After three months, ¡Uno! had shifted 256,000 copies in the US. The album has sold over 325,000 copies in the US. In the United Kingdom, it also debuted at number two on the UK Albums Chart on first-week sales of 42,651 copies. As of October 13, 2016, ¡Uno! has sold 125,531 copies in the UK. In Canada, the album debuted at number three on the Canadian Albums Chart selling 12,000 copies.

== Track listing ==
All lyrics are written by Billie Joe Armstrong; all music is composed by Green Day (Armstrong, Mike Dirnt, Tré Cool) except where noted

No.	Title	Music	Length
1.	"Nuclear Family"		3:03
2.	"Stay the Night"		4:36
3.	"Carpe Diem"	Green Day; Jeff Shadbolt	3:25
4.	"Let Yourself Go"		2:57
5.	"Kill the DJ"	Green Day; Mirwais Ahmadzaï	3:41
6.	"Fell for You"		3:08
7.	"Loss of Control"	Green Day; Chrissie Hynde; James Honeyman-Scott	3:07
8.	"Troublemaker"		2:45
9.	"Angel Blue"		2:46
10.	"Sweet 16"		3:03
11.	"Rusty James"		4:09
12.	"Oh Love"		5:03
Total length:			41:44

iTunes deluxe edition / box set digital download
No.	Title	Length
13.	"Stay the Night" (music video)	4:38
14.	"Let Yourself Go" (Live video, Recorded at Red 7 in Austin, TX; November 17th, 2011)	3:44
15.	"Kill the DJ" (music video)	3:43
16.	"Oh Love" (music video)	5:12

Japan CD only bonus track
No.	Title	Length
13.	"Let Yourself Go" (Recorded at Red 7 in Austin, TX; November 17th, 2011)	3:23

Converse / Soundcloud Digital Deluxe Edition
No.	Title	Length
13.	"Let Yourself Go (Live at Irving Plaza, New York, September 15, 2012)"	3:29
14.	"Oh Love (Live at Irving Plaza, New York, September 15, 2012)"	4:58
15.	"Stay the Night (Live at Irving Plaza, New York, September 15, 2012)"	5:26

== Personnel ==
Personnel taken from ¡Uno! liner notes, except where noted.

Green Day

- Billie Joe Armstrong – guitar, vocals
- Mike Dirnt – bass, vocals
- Tré Cool – drums, vocals

Additional musicians

- Jason White (Note: Despite being credited as a member of Green Day in the liner notes, Jason White has confirmed that he was never an official member of the band.) – guitar
- Rob Cavallo – keyboards

Production

- Rob Cavallo – producer
- Green Day – producers
- Chris Dugan – engineer
- Chris Lord-Alge – mixing
- Brad Kobylczak – second engineer
- Lee Bothwick – additional engineering
- Keith Armstrong – mixing assistant
- Nik Karpen – mixing assistant
- Brad Townsend – additional mixing assistant
- Andrew Schubert – additional mixing assistant
- Ted Jensen – mastering
- Andrew "Hans" Buscher – guitar technician
- Eden Galindo – bass technician
- Mike Fasano – drum technician
- Kenny Butler – drum technician
- Jaime Neely – production assistant
- Michelle Rogel – production assistant

Artwork

- Bill Schneider – artwork, graphic design
- Billie Joe Armstrong – cover photo
- Theo "Firecracker" Stockman – back cover photo
- Felisha Tolentino – photography

== Charts ==
=== Weekly charts ===
Weekly chart performance for ¡Uno!
Chart (2012)	Peak position
Argentinean Albums (CAPIF)	3
Australian Albums (ARIA)	3
Austrian Albums (Ö3 Austria)	1
Belgian Albums (Ultratop Flanders)	6
Belgian Albums (Ultratop Wallonia)	5
Brazilian Albums (ABPD)	3
Canadian Albums (Billboard)	3
Czech Albums (IFPI)	7
Danish Albums (Hitlisten)	8
Dutch Albums (Album Top 100)	8
Finnish Albums (Suomen virallinen lista)	4
French Albums (SNEP)	12
German Albums (Offizielle Top 100)	3
Hungarian Albums (MAHASZ)	1
Irish Albums (IRMA)	3
Italian Albums (FIMI)	1
Japanese Albums (Oricon)	3
Mexican Albums (Top 100 Mexico)	5
New Zealand Albums (RMNZ)	2
Norwegian Albums (VG-lista)	3
Peruvian Albums Chart	1
Polish Albums (ZPAV)	12
Portuguese Albums (AFP)	13
Scottish Albums (Official Charts)	3
South Korean Albums (Goan)	2
Spanish Albums (Promusicae)	4
Swedish Albums (Sverigetopplistan)	3
Swiss Albums (Schweizer Hitparade)	4
UK Albums (Official Charts)	2
UK Rock & Metal Albums (Official Charts)	1
US Billboard 200	2
US Top Rock Albums (Billboard)	2

=== Year-end charts ===
2012 year-end chart performance for ¡Uno!
Chart (2012)	Rank
Austrian Albums Chart	48
French Albums Chart	172
German Albums Chart	61
Hungarian Albums Chart	16
Italian Albums Chart	82
South Korean International Albums (Gaon)	40
Swiss Albums Chart	53
US Billboard 200	127
US Alternative Albums (Billboard)	20
US Top Rock Albums (Billboard)	34

== Certifications ==
Region	Certification	Certified units/sales
Austria (IFPI Austria)	Gold	10,000^{*}
Canada (Music Canada)	Gold	40,000^{^}
Germany (BVMI)	Gold	100,000^{^}
Italy (FIMI)	Gold	30,000^{*}
Japan (RIAJ)	Gold	100,000^{^}
United Kingdom (BPI)	Gold	100,000^{^}
Summaries
Worldwide (2012)	—	1,100,000
^{*} Sales figures based on certification alone.^{^} Shipments figures based on certification alone.

== Release history ==
Country	Date	Format
Australia	September 21, 2012	CD, digital download, LP
United Kingdom	September 24, 2012	CD, digital download, LP
United States	September 25, 2012	CD, digital download, LP
