= The Big Cats =

American rock band

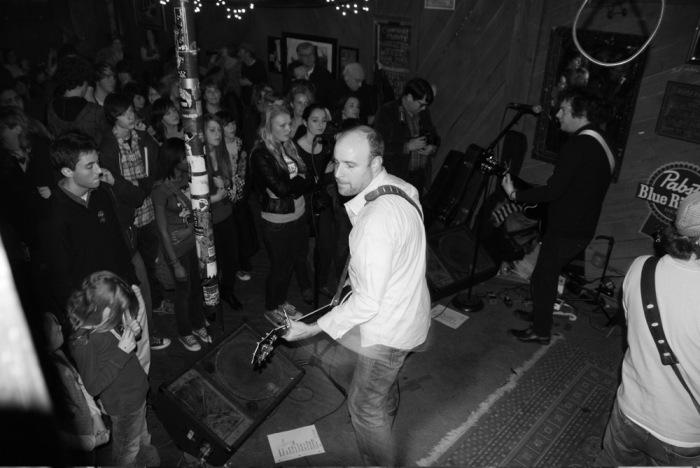
- The Big Cats performing in Little Rock (December 2010)

Background information
- Origin: Little Rock, Arkansas, United States
- Genres: Rock, jangle pop
- Years active: 1993–1997; 2000–present
- Label: Max Recordings
- Members: Burt Taggart; Jason White; Josh Bentley; Colin Brooks
- Past members: Shannon Yarbrough
- Website: thebigcatsmusic.com

The Big Cats are an American rock band from Little Rock, Arkansas. They were formed in 1993 by members of various Little Rock punk bands, but shifted their sound from punk rock to early rock and roll.

== History ==
=== Early years ===
The Big Cats formed in 1993 following the breakups of Burt Taggart's previous band, Chino Horde, and Colin Brooks and Josh Bentley's band, Substance. Each of the members had grown up in and around Little Rock, Arkansas, and played together in earlier bands. They made their live debut at a New Year's Eve party on December 31, 1993. In 1994, Shannon Yarbrough, Taggart's former bandmate in 5-0, joined the band.

In 1996, Bentley moved to Nashville. Pinhead Gunpowder's Jason White (who had previously played in Chino Hoarde), moved back from Berkeley, California, to Arkansas to replace him. This incarnation of the band won local accolades, continued to write and record, and eventually toured the midwest and northeast United States with the thought of relocating. Unable to reach a consensus of where to move, the group disbanded. Over the next two years, Taggart, Brooks, and Yarbrough moved to Brooklyn, New York, while White returned to Berkeley and continued to play with Pinhead Gunpowder, eventually joining Green Day.

=== Yarbough's death ===
On May 7, 2000, Shannon Yarbrough was killed in an automobile accident. The loss brought the surviving band members back together to play a tribute show for him the following Christmas. A year after his death, the Big Cats regrouped in a Fayetteville, Arkansas, studio to record a two song 45 single on their newly formed label, Max Recordings. The songs from the single were later grouped with unreleased recordings throughout the 1990s, and released as the 2002 compilation album, Worrisome Blues.

=== On Tomorrow ===
In the spring of 2006, White, who was on break from Green Day, and Brooks, who had begun playing with the Canadian based band the Stills, began making trips back to Little Rock, to write a full length Big Cats album. This would become On Tomorrow, which was recorded with Barry Poynter at his studio in Little Rock. Pop Matters gave the record a rating of 6/10. Stewart Mason of All Music said about the album, "In some ways, the Big Cats are so retro they're positively cutting edge: this Little Rock quartet is a jangly guitar pop band from the South, a style of music that was absolutely everywhere in the post-R.E.M. '80s but has been decidedly absent from the cultural Zeitgeist for quite some time. On Tomorrow isn't some kind of archeological enterprise, however: this kind of low-key, earnest jangle pop is more timeless than that."

=== The Ancient Art Of Leaving ===
In January 2010, the band began the follow-up to On Tomorrow, again working with Barry Poynter. They set out to develop and arrange the 25 demos that Taggart had written. By late October the band announced that recording had finally come to an end and that they would be releasing 25 songs as a two part album in late 2011 and early 2012. On December 13, 2011, the first half of that effort was released, titled The Ancient Art Of Leaving: High & Low.

Arriving nearly a year after The Ancient Art Of Leaving: High & Low, part two of the Big Cats 25 song project The Ancient Art Of Leaving: Two Parts was released on November 6, 2012. The band also announced via their website that there will be a limited 3xLP vinyl release of the entire project titled simply The Ancient Art Of Leaving available on the same date.

== Band members ==
Current

- Burt Taggart – guitar, lead vocals (1993–1997, 2000–present)
- Josh Bentley – bass (1993–1996, 2000–present)
- Colin Brooks – drums (1993–1997, 2000–present)
- Jason White – bass (1996–1997); guitar (2000–present); vocals (1996–1997, 2000–present)

Former

- Shannon Yarbrough – guitar (1993–1996; died 2000)

== Discography ==
=== Studio albums ===
- On Tomorrow (2007)
- The Ancient Art Of Leaving: High & Low (2011)
- The Ancient Art Of Leaving: Two Parts (2012)

=== Compilation albums ===
- Worrisome Blues (2002)

=== Singles ===
- "Fayetteville Blues" / "The Sun's Always Finding My Way Around" (2001)
- "Shining" (2014)

=== Other recordings ===
- "Rock And Roll Nightmare" on Listen To What I'm Made Of: Songs By And For Shannon Yarbrough
- "Runaway" on Towncraft (film)
