= Jason Chandler (singer) =

American vocalist

Jason Chandler (born March 24, 1969) is the lead vocalist for the rock band the Frustrators.

He attended King Philip High School in Wrentham, Massachusetts, where he met fellow future Frustrator, Art Tedeschi. Chandler and Tedeschi were both in the bands Thrash Frog and Violent Anal Death. Chandler's first band, which included his brother Adam, was formed in his sixth grade year and was called Sliced For Chops.

== Currently ==
Besides creating designs and cartoons for the Frustrators, Chandler lends his artistic talents to Nobyl Skateboards and several other projects including the design several of Keith Knight's (Th)ink Anthology books. He has created shirts, posters, and CD designs for Bobby Joe Ebola and the Children MacNuggits. He has also responsible for the art work to all of the Foxboro Hot Tubs CD and vinyl releases, and for the backdrops displayed at their concerts.
