= The Coverups =

American cover band

- Origin: Oakland, California, U.S.
- Genres: Rock; punk rock; power pop
- Years active: 2018–present
- Spinoff of: Green Day
- Members: Billie Joe Armstrong; Jason White; Chris Dugan; Bill Schneider
- Past members: Mike Dirnt

The Coverups is an American cover band that serves as a side project for Green Day members Billie Joe Armstrong and Mike Dirnt. Founded in January 2018 as an outlet for performing cover songs, the band consists of guitarists Armstrong and Dirnt as well as several musicians from the Green Day circle, such as touring guitarist Jason White, audio engineer Chris Dugan on drums and tour manager Bill Schneider on bass. White, Armstrong, and Dirnt all share lead vocal duties.

The band performed their first shows at the Ivy Room in Albany, California, on January 15 and January 29, 2018. Although the band has not formally toured or recorded, they sporadically perform one-off shows, usually in small clubs. Some shows are unannounced, such as their third show, a performance in San Francisco on March 8, 2018.

Since the Coverups returned to occasional performances in 2021 after the COVID-19 pandemic, Mike Dirnt has not played with the band and is assumed to have quietly quit. Greg Schneider filled in for him during a few early 2021 shows before the band settled as a four-piece.

On December 31, 2023, they put on a New Year's Eve concert benefitting Project Chimps, a chimpanzee sanctuary in Morganton, Georgia, at the El Rey Theatre in Los Angeles.

They played 2 shows in London, on 27 February and 1 March 2024. The shows took place at The Garage and the 100 Club. Courtney Love joined them on stage at The Garage and 100 Club shows.

On March 25, 2026, they announced a surprise concert at a bar in Berkeley, California just hours before taking the stage. They played in Oakland, California on May 2, 2026 at the Fox Theatre as part of the Notes & Words benefit concert.

== Band members ==
=== Current ===
- Billie Joe Armstrong – lead vocals, guitar (2018–present)
- Jason White – vocals, guitar (2018–present)
- Bill Schneider – vocals, bass (2018–present)
- Chris Dugan – drums (2018–present)

=== Former ===
- Mike Dirnt – vocals, guitar (2018–2019)

=== Guest ===
- Greg Schneider – bass, guitar, vocals (2021)

== See also ==
- Me First and the Gimme Gimmes
- Foxboro Hot Tubs
