= Cigarettes and Valentines =

Unreleased 2003 studio album by Green Day

Studio album by Green Day
- Released: Unreleased
- Recorded: July–October 2002
- Studio: Studio 880, Oakland, California
- Genre: Punk rock
- Label: Reprise
- Producers: Rob Cavallo; Green Day

Cigarettes and Valentines is an unreleased album by the American rock band Green Day. The album would have been the follow-up to Warning (2000). Sixteen tracks were written and recorded in six months. After turning in the record, the band composed two or three additional songs, and decided these were "worth chasing". Instead of releasing Cigarettes and Valentines, the band made a new album with those additional songs, which led to the creation of American Idiot (2004).

However, the band has stated multiple times that in the summer of 2003, when the album was nearly finished, the master tapes were stolen from the band's studio, and instead of re-recording the album, they decided to start from scratch, leading to the creation of American Idiot.

To date, only the title track has been released in full form. However, the American Idiot track "Homecoming", including demo tracks "Everyone's Breaking Down" and "Just Another Year", contain elements of the album.

On February 26, 2011, bassist Mike Dirnt confirmed three songs that were originally recorded for the album: "Dropout", "Sleepyhead", and "Walk Away". Notably, "Walk Away" is also the title of a song on the band's eleventh studio album, ¡Tré! (2012).

== History ==
Lead singer Billie Joe Armstrong said the album's material was "good stuff". Musically, the material on Cigarettes and Valentines was hard, "quick-tempoed punk" songs in the vein of Kerplunk (1991), and Insomniac (1995). This sound would have contrasted the group's previous two albums, Nimrod (1997), and Warning (2000), which displayed more rock, and folk punk genres, respectively. Bassist Mike Dirnt described the band's decision of returning to the sound found on their older albums, stating, "We've had a nice break from making hard and fast music and it's made us want to do it again."

When the album was nearly complete in 2003, the album's master tapes were allegedly stolen from the studio. However, Green Day would later call the alleged theft a "blessing in disguise", believing the album was not "maximum Green Day". Dirnt said that backups of the tapes were made but claims that "it just wasn't the same as the originals". Ultimately the band decided against re-recording the album and instead started from scratch, which eventually led to the creation of their 2004 album American Idiot. Some songs were later re-recorded or reworked into new songs, but the original versions of the songs have never been officially released.

However, Dirnt also said that after the band turned the album in, they had two or three additional songs left that they really liked. After getting together, they decided to make a brand new album (American Idiot) with those additional songs, instead of releasing Cigarettes and Valentines: "Those are really good songs, but we got these over here, and we kinda felt like, should we put out these, and wait three or four years to put out these other songs and chase this thing that we kind of got going on over here?"

The Network's album Money Money 2020, released on September 30, 2003, through Billie Joe Armstrong's Adeline Records, was speculated by some fans as being a re-recording of the album, or to contain aspects of it. Armstrong has denied any connection between the two projects in various interviews.

== Title song ==
"Cigarettes and Valentines"

Single by Green Day

from the album Awesome as Fuck
- Released: February 21, 2011
- Recorded: August 30, 2010
- Venue: Cricket Wireless Pavilion, Phoenix, Arizona
- Genre: Punk rock
- Length: 2:45
- Label: Reprise
- Songwriters: Billie Joe Armstrong; Mike Dirnt; Tré Cool
- Producers: Rob Cavallo; Green Day

Green Day singles chronology
"When It's Time" (2010)	"Cigarettes and Valentines" (2011)	"Don't Want to Know If You Are Lonely" (2011)

Music video
- "Cigarettes and Valentines (Live)" on YouTube

The title song, "Cigarettes and Valentines", was first played live in Greenwood Village, Colorado, on August 28, 2010, during the band's concert at the Comfort Dental Amphitheatre while on their 21st Century Breakdown World Tour. This show was being filmed to eventually contribute to a forthcoming live album, leading to speculation that some of the songs from the Cigarettes and Valentines sessions would eventually be released.

A live recording of "Cigarettes and Valentines" was released on the Awesome as Fuck (2011) live album. On February 14, 2011, a lyric video for the song was released on Green Day's official YouTube channel. Four days later, a music video for the song was released there as well. A live promo single was released on February 21, 2011, containing 2:43 of the performance in Phoenix, Arizona, on August 30, 2010. The shots of the crowd are from the concert in Buenos Aires, Argentina.
