= The Frustrators =

American punk rock band

- Origin: New England, U.S.
- Genres: Punk rock
- Years active: 1999–present
- Labels: Adeline
- Members: Jason Chandler; Terry Linehan; Art Tedeschi; Mike Dirnt

The Frustrators are an American punk rock band with Jason Chandler (lead vocals), Terry Linehan (guitar, vocals), Art Tedeschi (drums), and Mike Dirnt (bass, vocals). All are members of other bands: Terry Linehan from Waterdog, Jason Chandler and Art Tedeschi from Violent Anal Death, and Mike Dirnt from Green Day.

They have had two releases with Adeline Records: the EP Bored in the USA and their debut LP, Achtung Jackass. The Frustrators released a new EP, entitled Griller, on February 15, 2011.

== Achtung Jackass era ==
On 11 March 2002, the Frustrators released Achtung Jackass on the Adeline Records label. "Bonus Track" is recorded backwards.

A reviewer at AllMusic described the album as "an enjoyable combination of new wave and bratty, goofball punk", with the song "My Best Friend's Girl" pegged as "setting the tone for the record" and showing "the band's ability to earnestly incorporate the diverse catchiness of new wave that makes it so true blue".

== Band members ==
- Jason Chandler – lead vocals (1999–present)
- Terry Linehan – guitar, vocals (1999–present)
- Mike Dirnt – bass, vocals (1999–present)
- Art Tedeschi – drums (1999–present)

== Discography ==
- Bored in the USA EP (2000) – Adeline Records
- Achtung Jackass (2002) – Adeline Records
- Griller EP (2011) Adeline Records/Dr. Strange Records
