= Trans Am (EP) =

EP by The Network
- Released: November 20, 2020
- Recorded: 2020
- Length: 10:15
- Label: Joe Robot; Warner
- Producer: The Network

The Network chronology
Money Money 2020 (2003)	Trans Am (2020)	Money Money 2020 Part II: We Told Ya So! (2020)

Trans Am is a studio extended play (EP) by American new wave band the Network, a side project of the American punk rock band Green Day, released on November 20, 2020. It was the first release from the Network in seventeen years.

== Background ==
After releasing their debut album, Money Money 2020, in 2003, and opening for some dates during a Green Day tour in 2005, the band went on a fifteen-year hiatus. Mike Dirnt subsequently confirmed in an interview with Rolling Stone in 2013 that Green Day were, in fact, behind the Network. In October 2020, the band suddenly became active again, posting to their social media profiles a music video for their song "The Prophecy".

== Release and promotion ==
On November 2, 2020, the Network posted the music video for the song "Ivankkka Is a Nazi" to their Instagram. This came with rebuttals from the members of Green Day, with them repeatedly stating they were not affiliated with the Network. On November 20, the Network released the music video for Trans Am onto their official YouTube channel. At the same time, the Trans Am EP was released onto streaming platforms. The release of the EP came with the announcement of their second album, Money Money 2020 Part II: We Told Ya So!. Music videos for the other songs on the EP, "Flat Earth" and "Fentanyl", were released afterwards.

== Track listing ==
All music is composed by The Network.

No.	Title	Length
1.	"Trans Am"	1:59
2.	"Flat Earth"	2:16
3.	"Fentanyl"	2:58
4.	"Ivankkka Is A Nazi"	3:02
Total length:		10:15

== Personnel ==
- Fink – vocals on "Fentanyl" and "Ivankkka Is A Nazi", lead guitar
- Van Gough – vocals on "Trans Am", bass guitar
- The Snoo – drums, vocals on "Flat Earth"
- Balducci – rhythm guitar
- Z – keyboards, backing vocals
- Captain Underpants – keytar
