= The Influents =

American punk rock band

- Origin: East Bay, California, U.S.
- Genres: Punk rock; pop-punk; alternative rock
- Years active: 1999–2003
- Label: Adeline
- Past members: Jason White; Greg Schneider; Willie Samuels; Bill Schneider; Johnnie Wentz

The Influents were an American punk rock band formed in 1999 by Jason White and Bill Schneider. Both were members of the seminal East Bay punk band Pinhead Gunpowder, which featured White on guitar and Schneider on bass, but due to the sporadic nature of Pinhead Gunpowder's recording and gigging (between May 1992 and April 2001, they played just fifteen shows), White and Schneider decided to form a new band as a side-project on which to focus. Schneider's brother Greg joined as second guitarist, sharing songwriting and vocals with Jason, and drummer Willie Samuels completed the lineup.

The Influents released their debut album, Check Please, through Adeline Records in 2000. After the record was released, Bill Schneider left the band amicably to focus on his music shop, and Johnnie Wentz filled in on bass. This lineup released one more album, Some of the Young, in 2003, before dissolving.

Bill Schneider and Jason White are both involved in Grammy Award-winning punk band Green Day. Schneider was a guitar tech for frontman Billie Joe Armstrong, bass tech for Mike Dirnt and now works as their tour manager, while White was the touring guitarist for the band from 1999 to 2012 and was an official member of the band from 2012 until 2016. He also appeared in several Green Day music videos.

As of June 2021, both of their albums are available on all major streaming platforms.

== Band members ==
- Jason White – lead vocals, guitar (1999–2003)
- Greg Schneider – vocals, guitar (1999–2003)
- Bill Schneider – bass (1999–2003)
- Johnnie Wentz – bass (1999–2003)
- Willie Samuels – drums (1999–2003)

== Discography ==
- Check Please (Adeline Records, 2000)
- Some of the Young (Adeline Records, 2003)
