= Money Money 2020 =

Studio album by The Network
- Released: September 30, 2003; November 9, 2004 (Reprise re-release)
- Recorded: August 2003
- Genre: New wave; pop punk; post-punk revival; synthpunk; punk rock
- Length: 27:22 (original), 33:28 (re-release)
- Label: Adeline; Reprise (re-release)
- Producer: The Network

The Network chronology
Money Money 2020 (2003)	Trans Am (2020)

Professional ratings
Review scores
Source	Rating
IGN	7.5/10
Kerrang!	3/5 stars

Money Money 2020 is the debut studio album by new wave band the Network, a side project of the band Green Day. It was released on September 30, 2003, through Adeline Records. Members of Green Day have denied being involved in the Network; however, Mike Dirnt revealed that they had a hand in the album. It was the band's only release for seventeen years until they returned in 2020 with a sequel album entitled Money Money 2020 Part II: We Told Ya So!.

== Background ==
After the release of Green Day's sixth album, Warning (2000), the band started work in 2003 on their next album which was intended to be named Cigarettes and Valentines. The master tapes were stolen, however, and the band decided to scrap the project and start over.

It was originally speculated by some reviewers that Cigarettes and Valentines eventually became Money Money 2020. This rumour, however, was repeatedly denied and debunked by Billie Joe Armstrong.

== Release ==
Money Money 2020 was officially released on September 30, 2003, through Adeline Records. Upon release, the album came with a DVD that featured seven music videos for the songs "Supermodel Robots", "Joe Robot", "Hungry Hungry Models", "Love and Money", "Spike", "Transistors Gone Wild", and "Roshambo". In 2004, the Network released another DVD containing live concert footage and the previous music videos, entitled Disease is Punishment. On July 25, 2015, the band released the DVD onto YouTube.

On November 9, 2004, the album was re-released by Reprise Records. This release did not include the DVD, but it did include two additional tracks, "Teenagers from Mars" and "Hammer of the Gods". The song "Roshambo" was featured in the video game NHL 2005, and "Teenagers from Mars" was featured in the video game Tony Hawk's American Wasteland. The album was later released on vinyl by Adeline Records in 2011 and 2015, but only featured the 12 tracks from the original release. In 2022, it was announced that the album would be re-pressed once again, this time including the two bonus tracks. This release was exclusive to 1-2-3-4 Go! Records, a record store in Oakland, California.

== Track listing ==
All tracks are written by Billie Joe Armstrong, Mike Dirnt, and Tré Cool, except "Teenagers from Mars", written by Glenn Danzig.

Money Money 2020 original track listing
No.	Title	Lead vocals	Length
1.	"Joe Robot"	Van Gough	2:02
2.	"Transistors Gone Wild"	Fink and Van Gough	1:28
3.	"Reto"	Van Gough	2:01
4.	"Supermodel Robots"	Fink	2:05
5.	"Money Money 2020"	Fink and Van Gough	2:12
6.	"Spike"	Fink	2:58
7.	"Love and Money"	Van Gough	1:21
8.	"Right Hand-A-Rama"	Fink	2:07
9.	"Roshambo"	Fink	2:46
10.	"Hungry Hungry Models"	The Snoo	2:42
11.	"Spastic Society"	Van Gough	2:26
12.	"X-Ray Hamburger"	Van Gough	3:14
Total length:			27:22

2004 re-release bonus tracks
No.	Title	Lead vocals	Length
13.	"Teenagers from Mars" (Misfits cover)	Fink	3:32
14.	"Hammer of the Gods"	Van Gough	2:34
Total length:			33:28

== Personnel ==
- Fink – lead vocals, lead guitar, backing vocals, drums on "Hungry Hungry Models"
- Van Gough – lead vocals, bass guitar, backing vocals
- The Snoo – drums, lead vocals on "Hungry Hungry Models"
- Z – keyboards, backing vocals, keytar on "Right Hand-A-Rama"
- Captain Underpants – keytar, keyboards on "Right Hand-A-Rama"
- Balducci – rhythm guitar
