= Oh Love =

2012 single by green day

Single by Green Day

from the album ¡Uno!
- Released: July 16, 2012
- Recorded: February 14 – June 26, 2012, at Jingletown Studios in Oakland, California
- Genre: Power pop
- Length: 5:02 (¡Uno! version); 4:19 (radio edit); 5:13 (Otis Big Guitar Mix version)
- Label: Reprise; Warner Bros.
- Songwriters: Billie Joe Armstrong; Mike Dirnt; Tré Cool
- Producers: Rob Cavallo; Green Day

Green Day singles chronology
"Don't Want To Know If You Are Lonely" (2011)	"Oh Love" (2012)	"Kill the DJ" (2012)

Music video
- "Oh Love" on YouTube

Oh Love E.P.

EP by Green Day
- Released: August 14, 2012
- Genres: Power pop, punk rock, pop-punk
- Length: 20:55
- Labels: Reprise, Warner Bros.
- Producers: Rob Cavallo; Butch Vig; Green Day

Green Day chronology
Awesome as Fuck (2011)	Oh Love E.P. (2012)	¡Uno! (2012)

"Oh Love" is a song by American rock band Green Day. It was released as the lead single from their ninth studio album, ¡Uno!, through Reprise Records on July 16, 2012, and is the album's closing track. It is also the first single overall from the ¡Uno!, ¡Dos! & ¡Tré! trilogy. The Walmart-exclusive Oh Love E.P. was released on August 14, 2012 which included songs from American Idiot and 21st Century Breakdown. "Oh Love" was recorded at Jingletown Studios from February 14 to June 26, 2012; however, it was also played at a secret show held by the band in 2011.

Critical response to the song was mixed; it was praised for its musical style and tone, as well as criticized for being "middle-ground". It appeared on multiple charts worldwide upon its debut. The song made its debut in the number-one position on the US Rock Songs chart, making it the band's first song, and the third ever in history, to do so. It is also the band's last single to date to chart on the Billboard Hot 100 chart.

It is the only song from the ¡Uno! ¡Dos! ¡Tre! trilogy to be included on the 2017 compilation album God's Favorite Band.

== Background and release ==
The song was played at a "secret show" performed by the band on October 28, 2011, where the band also performed other songs that are on the track listing of ¡Uno!: "Let Yourself Go" and "Carpe Diem". Erica Futterman of Rolling Stone praised the band's performance while also writing, "Other new music included the blistering Ramones-tinged 'Let Yourself Go' ('Shut your mouth 'cause you're talking too much and I don't give a fuck anyway'), the driving beat and sing-along chorus of 'Carpe Diem,' and the strut of 'Oh Love'". Green Day went into the studio to begin recording songs for a new album on February 14, 2012. Eventually, the band announced the release of albums ¡Uno!, ¡Dos!, and ¡Tré!. The official confirmation of the song came with the release of the track listing of their album ¡Uno! on June 26, 2012.

On June 25, 2012, the band announced that they would be releasing "Oh Love" as the first single from ¡Uno!. Prior to its release, the band released a teaser-sample of the song in a video uploaded to YouTube. The 16-second video consists of the cover art of ¡Uno! and an advertisement at the bottom with a snippet of the song played in the background, and at the end shows the head of Armstrong in the cover art, eating the advertisement. The song was released on July 16, 2012, through Reprise Records and along with the release of the song, the band uploaded a video to YouTube which had its lyrics and the full song. On July 20, 2012, an extended play of the song was announced, which was released on August 14, 2012. "Oh Love" was released as part of the "Green Day 03" downloadable content pack for Rock Band 3 and Rock Band Blitz on September 25, 2012.

== Theme and composition ==
"Oh Love"
The sample contains a guitar-based melody with repetition of lines

Stylistically, "Oh Love" has been described as power pop. Its musical style is reminiscent of the band's early albums Dookie (1994) and Nimrod (1997). It is a "move away" from the band's politically inspired releases like American Idiot (2004) and 21st Century Breakdown (2009). Bassist Mike Dirnt described the musical style of "Oh Love" by stating, "We were just thinking about making a killer power-pop record – dirtier, back to basics. We tapped into our version of Exile on Main Street". Vocalist/guitarist Billie Joe Armstrong also talked about his desire to write a power pop song, stating, "What I really wanted to do was write real power-pop kind of music that had that old Green Day energy, so the original Green Day sound became ¡Uno!".

David Fricke of Rolling Stone compared the song to the genre of the Who's Quadrophenia and the vocals of Armstrong in the start to those of John Lennon. He called the song a "tight, addicting bundle of pop-hook class and crunchy-punk fundamentals". Sarah Maloy of Billboard elaborated that the guitar instrumentation is simple and the tune is similar to the band's early releases.

== Artwork ==
The band revealed the artwork of "Oh Love" on July 10, 2012, in a press release on their official website about the release of the song. The cover art of the song follows the style of those of ¡Uno!, ¡Dos!, and ¡Tré!. It features a traffic signal post on the right side with a heart on top followed by two crosses below. "Green Day" and "Oh Love" are written in capital letters at top left and bottom left respectively. "Green Day" is written in pale yellow while "Oh Love" is in white against the blue background, which shows contrast between light-dark and light shades along with black in the corner.

The band also announced release of an EP of the song and also showed its artwork, which is similar with minor variations in color and images. It features a traffic signal post on the right side similar to the song with a cross instead of a heart on top followed by a heart-shaped hand grenade and a couple kissing, the artwork for American Idiot and 21st Century Breakdown, respectively, instead of two crosses below. "Green Day", in blue, and "Oh Love E.P.", in white, are written in capital letters on the left top and bottom respectively, against a striped red background with blackened corners.

== Music video ==
The music video is directed by Samuel Bayer, who also directed the band's American Idiot videos. Lead singer Billie Joe Armstrong said of the video on MTV: "It's very lustful". The video shows the stereotypes of a rock star's life. An explicit version of the video featuring nudity was released through Playboy on September 18, 2012.

== Critical reception ==
The song received mostly positive responses from a number of critics. David Fricke of Rolling Stone assigned the track four out of five stars, deeming it "just a bright, strident vocal and crisply strummed guitar. But when Armstrong’s bandmates fall in around him, Green Day sound the way you originally loved ’em, and refreshed: heavier and hardened from their time in the trenches but back in the garage, ready for rapture". Scott Shetler of PopCrush also rated the song four out of five stars and compared it to the song "Jesus of Suburbia" from the album American Idiot, calling it "a much shorter and slightly more accessible version" of that song. He also added, "That's good news for Green Day fans and for those who miss rock music on Top 40 radio". However, the song did not receive an entirely positive response from NME, who stated, "That crunchy guitar riff, that meandering melody, that by-the-numbers solo – it all comes off rather ‘meh’, rather safe, and rather middle-ground to these ears".

== Chart performance ==
Upon its release as the lead song, "Oh Love" debuted on multiple world charts. The song made its debut at number one on the US Rock Songs with 13 million audience impressions at 145 reporting stations. The song is the band's first and only the third ever to debut at number one on the chart, following Linkin Park's "The Catalyst" on August 21, 2010, and Foo Fighters' "Rope" on March 12, 2011. The song also debuted on the US Alternative Songs at number seven and peaked at number three. It became the band's 28th title on the Alternative Songs tally and the 20th song to chart in the Top 10 Alternative Songs—the third highest number of songs by a single artist to do so, sharing that position with Foo Fighters and trailing U2 and Red Hot Chili Peppers with 23 and 24 charting in the Top 10 respectively. It debuted on the Japan Hot 100 at 27 and the Canadian Hot 100 at 54. On the Czech Airplay Chart, it made its debut at number 69. It debuted at number 73 on the Belgian Tip Chart and at 88 on the Netherlands Single Top 100. It also debuted at 83 on the Media Control Germany Top 100 Singles Chart.

== Track listing ==
Promo CD
No.	Title	Length
1.	"Oh Love (Edit)"	4:19

Digital Download
No.	Title	Length
1.	"Oh Love"	5:03

Oh Love E.P. track listing
No.	Title	Length
1.	"Oh Love"	5:04
2.	"American Idiot" (Censored version)	2:55
3.	"Boulevard of Broken Dreams" (Censored version)	4:22
4.	"21 Guns"	5:22
5.	"Know Your Enemy"	3:11
Total length:		20:57

== Credits and personnel ==
- Songwriting: Billie Joe Armstrong, Mike Dirnt, Tré Cool
- Production: Rob Cavallo, Green Day
- Billie Joe Armstrong – lead guitar, vocals
- Mike Dirnt – bass guitar, vocals
- Tré Cool – drums, percussion
- Jason White – guitar

== Charts and certifications ==
=== Weekly charts ===
Chart (2012)	Peak position
Austria (Ö3 Austria Top 40)	28
Belgium (Ultratip Flanders)	24
Belgium (Ultratip Wallonia)	23
Canada Hot 100 (Billboard)	45
Canada Rock (Billboard)	1
Czech Republic (IFPI)	32
Germany (GfK)	44
Israel (Media Forest)	6
Italy (FIMI)	25
Japan Hot 100 (Billboard)	5
Netherlands (Dutch Top 40 Tipparade)	11
Netherlands (Single Top 100)	88
South Korea (Gaon Chart)	16
Switzerland (Schweizer Hitparade)	65
UK Rock & Metal (Official Charts)	18
US Billboard Hot 100	97
US Adult Pop Airplay (Billboard)	23
US Hot Rock & Alternative Songs (Billboard)	1

=== Year-end charts ===
Chart (2012)	Peak position
Japan (Japan Hot 100)	62
US Rock Songs	22
US Alternative Songs	30

=== Certifications ===
Region	Certification	Certified units/sales
Italy (FIMI)	Gold	15,000^{‡}
^{‡} Sales+streaming figures based on certification alone.

== Release history ==
Release dates and formats for "Oh Love"
Region	Date	Format	Label(s)	Ref.
United States	September 11, 2012	Mainstream airplay	Warner Bros.	
