= Teenagers from Mars =

Single by the Misfits

from the album Static Age
- A-side: "Horror Business"
- Written: Glenn Danzig
- Released: June 26, 1979
- Recorded: January 1979
- Studio: C.I., New York City
- Length: 2:50
- Label: Plan 9
- Producers: Dave Achelis; Tom Bejgrowicz

"Teenagers from Mars" is a song by the American punk rock band Misfits. Written by vocalist Glenn Danzig, the song was first released as the B-side of the band's 1979 single "Horror Business", alongside the song "Children in Heat". "Teenagers from Mars" was later included on the Misfits' 1980 EP Beware, as well as on the 1986 compilation album Misfits. In 1996, when the band's proposed debut album Static Age first received an official release as part of the boxed set The Misfits, "Teenagers from Mars" was included as one of the tracks.

== Recording and release ==
In 1978, the Misfits recorded a version of "Teenagers from Mars" which they considered releasing as a single. Six acetate discs of the proposed single were pressed, one with "Teenagers from Mars" on both sides, and five with "Teenagers from Mars" on one side and the song "Static Age" on the other side. However, they decided not to issue it as a wide release. Between January 26 and February 5, 1979, the Misfits recorded the version of "Teenagers from Mars" which would be released on the single "Horror Business", along with the single's title track and the song "Children in Heat". These recording sessions took place at C.I. Studios in New York, where the band had recorded tracks for their proposed debut album Static Age a year prior.

On June 26, 1979, "Teenagers from Mars" and "Children in Heat" were first released as the B-side of the "Horror Business" single, which was issued through Glenn Danzig's own label, Plan 9 Records. This first pressing consisted of 25 sleeveless black 7" vinyl copies, and a second pressing in August 1979 consisted of 2,000 copies on yellow vinyl. Since then, "Teenagers from Mars" has been re-issued several times. In 1980, the song was included on the Misfits' EP Beware, and in 1986, it was included on the compilation album Misfits, also known as Collection I. Every song included on Collection I was later included in the 1996 boxed set The Misfits. "Teenagers from Mars" was also included on the album Static Age, which was part of the boxed set and which received a standalone release in 1997.

Mark Kennedy, the creator of the website Misfits Central, noted that the song may have been influenced by the 1953 film Invaders from Mars and the 1959 film Teenagers from Outer Space.

== Critical reception ==
Eduardo Rivadavia of Ultimate Classic Rock ranked the song #10 on his list of the 10 best Misfits songs, and wrote that the track "locked into a monstrous mid-paced groove and never let go, giving Glenn Danzig ample room to make a case that teenagers are pretty much apathetic contrarians on any given planet". In his book This Music Leaves Stains: The Complete Story of the Misfits, author James Greene, Jr. writes that the song "presents more stuttering riffs under ominous declarations from a conquering alien race unconcerned with human suffering as they 'land in barren fields' to inseminate our females".

== Personnel ==
The Misfits

- Glenn Danzig – vocals
- Bobby Steele – guitar
- Jerry Only – bass guitar
- Joey Image – drums

Production

- Dave Achelis – engineer
- Tom Bejgrowicz – producer

== Cover versions ==
In 2003, the new wave band the Network (a secret side-project of the punk rock band Green Day) recorded and released a cover version of "Teenagers from Mars" on their album Money Money 2020. The Nutley Brass recorded an instrumental lounge cover of the song, which was included on their 2005 Misfits tribute album Fiend Club Lounge. Punk cover band TV Casualty has also covered the song, with Ted Leo on vocals.

== See also ==
- "Horror Business"
- Misfits discography
