= Fuel (hardcore band) =

American rock band

- Origin: San Francisco Bay Area, California, U.S.
- Genres: Post-hardcore; melodic hardcore; emo; punk rock
- Years active: 1989–1991
- Labels: Cargo; Ebullition; Lookout; Rough Trade; Allied Recordings; Broken Rekids
- Past members: Sarah Kirsch; Jim Allison; Aaron Arroyo; Jeff Stofan

Fuel was a short-lived Bay Area post-hardcore musical act that created both personal and political songs, something that was unique during the "first wave" of emo in the 1990s. Fuel had a sound akin to the mostly East Coast bands on Dischord Records, especially Fugazi, with twin guitars and dueling rough post-hardcore vocals. In fact, it is noted that Fuel was often jokingly referred to as "Fuelgazi." Fuel's style resembled the D.C. sound of many Dischord bands.

Fuel featured Sarah Kirsch (then known as Mike Kirsch) of Pinhead Gunpowder on guitar/vocals, Jim Allison on guitar/vocals, Aaron Arroyo on bass, and Jeff Stofan (also of Monsula and the White Trash Debutantes at one time) on drums.

Fuel released one LP in 1990, first on Cargo Records then repressed by Ebullition Records. The album was produced by Kevin Army. Army audio engineered the albums of punk bands such as Operation Ivy, Green Day, and The Mr. T Experience. In addition, Fuel put out an EP "Take Effect" on Lookout Records, also in 1990. In the fall of 1991 the band also released a split 7-inch with Canadian band Phleg Camp on Allied Records. The CD release Monuments to Excess collected the LP, the Take Effect EP, the band's portion of a split EP, and some tracks that had appeared on compilations.

In 2008, Alternative Press named Fuel as a group of significant interest in its profile of "23 Bands who Shaped Punk." Fuel's album Fury was the main inspiration for the vocal style of Antioch Arrow. Jason Black of Hot Water Music and The Draft contributed a testimony for the article citing musical influence.

== Members ==
- Sarah Kirsch – guitar, vocals
- Jim Allison – guitar, vocals
- Aaron Arroyo – bass
- Jeff Stofan – drums

== Discography ==
=== Studio albums ===
- Fuel (1990)

=== Compilations ===
- Monuments to Excess (1995; reissued 2000)

=== EPs ===
- Take Effect (1990)
