= Money Money 2020 Part II: We Told Ya So! =

Studio album by The Network
- Released: December 4, 2020
- Recorded: 2020
- Studio: OTIS
- Genre: New wave
- Length: 54:43
- Label: Warner; Joe Robot
- Producer: The Network

The Network chronology
Trans Am (2020)	Money Money 2020 Part II: We Told Ya So! (2020)

Singles from Money Money 2020 Part II: We Told Ya So!
- 1. "The Prophecy" Released: October 29, 2020; 2. "Ivankkka Is a Nazi" Released: November 2, 2020; 3. "Trans Am" Released: November 20, 2020

Money Money 2020 Part II: We Told Ya So! is the second studio album by American new wave band the Network, a side-project featuring the members of Green Day. It was released on December 4, 2020, and was their first new album after seventeen years, following several weeks of subtle teases by the band via social media and several music videos from the promotional EP, Trans Am.

== Background ==
The Network gained a small cult following among Green Day fans during their brief initial period of activity. They released their debut album, Money Money 2020, as well as played a few small club shows in 2003 before becoming inactive until October 2005 when they opened for Green Day as part of their American Idiot World Tour.

The band would then go on a fifteen-year hiatus, re-emerging in October 2020 with a YouTube video entitled "The Prophecy". In the weeks following, a music video was released for the lead single, "Ivankkka Is a Nazi". On November 19, 2020, the band released an EP entitled Trans Am, which would feature four songs from the then-upcoming album. Following the EP's release, the band would reveal the album's title and artwork. In the week leading up to the album's release, the band uploaded a video each day to their social media accounts, featuring a snippet of each of the album's songs. Money Money 2020 Part II: We Told Ya So! was released on all streaming platforms on December 4, 2020, along with a pre-order for the album on vinyl and CD, which would ship out in April 2021.

== Promotion ==
Members of Green Day started reporting via social media accounts that their accounts were being hacked by members of the Network in October 2020, with the Church of Lushotology logos being posted on their accounts, and that of Billie Joe Armstrong's side project the Longshot. Green Day would continue their denial of being involved with the Network over the next few weeks while social media accounts for the Network started to appear and post teasers.

On February 27, 2021, the Network would perform their song "Threat Level Midnight" on The Tonight Show With Jimmy Fallon. While announced as the Network, Jimmy Fallon and Questlove would repeatedly hint at the band being Green Day during the show.

== Track listing ==
The vocals for all songs are performed by their respective writer's alter ego: Billie Joe Armstrong as Fink, Mike Dirnt as Van Gough, and Tré Cool as The Snoo – except for "Pizzagate", which is instrumental, and "Cancer Is the New Black", where both Armstrong and Dirnt perform the vocals.

All tracks are written by The Network.

Money Money 2020 Part II: We Told Ya So! track listing
No.	Title	Lead vocals	Length
1.	"The Prophecy"	Van Gough	1:39
2.	"Theory of Reality"	Fink	1:38
3.	"Trans Am"	Van Gough	1:59
4.	"Asphyxia"	The Snoo	1:56
5.	"Fentanyl"	Fink	2:58
6.	"Ivankkka Is a Nazi"	Fink	3:03
7.	"Digital Black"	Van Gough	3:19
8.	"Flat Earth"	The Snoo	2:16
9.	"Degenerate"	Fink	2:24
10.	"Pizzagate" (instrumental)		0:47
11.	"Carolina's Ultimate Netflix Tweet"	Fink	1:29
12.	"Respirator"	The Snoo	1:54
13.	"Squatter"	The Snoo	0:54
14.	"That's How They Get You"	The Snoo	2:25
15.	"Tarantula"	Van Gough	1:46
16.	"Cancer Is the New Black"	Van Gough; Fink	3:00
17.	"The Stranger"	The Snoo	1:37
18.	"Hey Elon"	The Snoo	1:17
19.	"Popper Punk"	Fink	2:58
20.	"Jerry Falwell's Pool Party"	Fink	3:24
21.	"Heard Immunity"	Van Gough	2:01
22.	"Time Capsule"	Van Gough	2:03
23.	"Threat Level Midnight"	Fink	2:15
24.	"Amnesia Vagabond"	Van Gough	2:08
25.	"Art of the Deal with the Devil"	Fink	3:33
Total length:			54:43

== Personnel ==
- Fink – lead vocals, lead guitar, backing vocals, drums
- Van Gough – lead vocals, bass guitar, backing vocals
- The Snoo – drums, lead vocals
- Balducci – rhythm guitar
- Z – keyboards, backing vocals
- Captain Underpants – keytar
