= The Network =

American new wave band

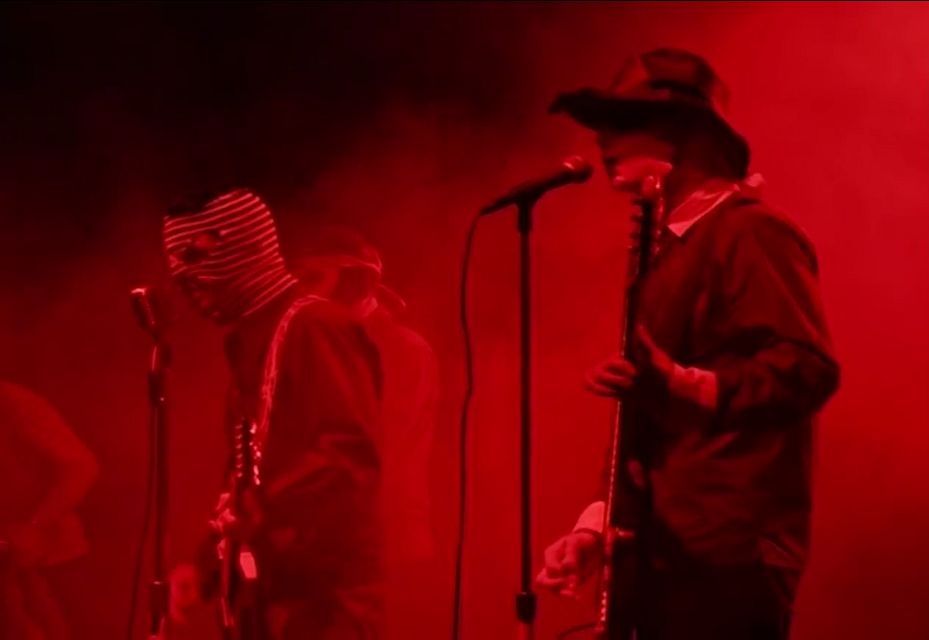
- The Network performing in 2004

Background information
- Origin: Oakland, California, U.S.
- Genres: New wave; pop punk; synth-pop
- Years active: 2003–2005; 2020–2021
- Labels: Adeline; Reprise; Warner; Joe Robot
- Spinoff of: Green Day
- Members: Fink; Van Gough; The Snoo; Z Captain Underpants; Balducci

The Network is an American six-piece new wave band. A "secret side project" of rock band Green Day, they released their debut album, Money Money 2020, on Adeline Records on September 30, 2003. After a 15-year hiatus, the band became active again, releasing a follow-up album titled Money Money 2020 Part II: We Told Ya So! in December 2020.

== History ==
Formed in the summer of 2003, the band consisted of lead vocalist Mongo Fink, bassist Van Gough, and drummer The Snoo, as well as additional members Captain Underpants and Z on keyboards and rhythm guitarist Balducci. They claimed they were "brought together by an ancient prophecy".

The band's debut album Money Money 2020 was released in September 2003 on Green Day singer Billie Joe Armstrong's record label Adeline Records. The Network concealed their identities by using accents and wearing masks. They frequently released press statements denouncing Green Day.

Shortly before the release of the debut album, Green Day's then-in-the-works album, Cigarettes and Valentines, was reportedly stolen. Due to the timeframe of the theft and the release of this album, many people speculated that they were related. However, Billie Joe Armstrong has denied connections between the two projects in various interviews, and in fact, that album was recovered and Armstrong and Mike Dirnt stated they had plans for it.

Money Money 2020 was remastered and rereleased by Reprise Records on November 9, 2004, with two additional tracks, "Hammer of the Gods" and a cover of the Misfits' "Teenagers from Mars", which can also be heard on Tony Hawk's American Wasteland while "Roshambo" is on the NHL 2005 soundtrack. The original Money Money 2020 release came with a companion DVD with music videos directed and produced by Roy Miles of AntiDivision.

In October 2005, the group opened for Green Day for several shows. After this, they became inactive.

In October 2020, after 15 years of inactivity, the band released a teaser trailer entitled "The Prophecy". In the video's description, the band announced the release of their forthcoming album, Money Money 2020 Part II: We Told Ya So!. On November 2, 2020, the band released a song entitled "Ivankkka Is A Nazi" to their YouTube page with an accompanying music video. On November 20, 2020, the band released an EP entitled Trans Am to promote their upcoming album, which is when they revealed the full title of their new album. Following music videos for the songs "Flat Earth" and "Fentanyl", the band released one-minute teaser videos for each group of songs (based upon the vinyl tracklisting) every day of the week of the album's release. On December 4, 2020, Money Money 2020 Part II: We Told Ya So! was released on streaming worldwide. On February 26, 2021, the band performed on The Tonight Show Starring Jimmy Fallon.

=== Identities ===
At the time, Armstrong denied the involvement of any Green Day members in the Network, saying "All I gotta say is fuck The Network. These guys are totally spreading rumors."

However, the three members of Green Day are cited as songwriters for Money Money 2020 by the group's publisher. Several journalists also noted that many songs from the band contained vocals that were unmistakably that of Armstrong. Additionally, it was shown that Armstrong owns a guitar amplifier with the logo of the Network featured on it.

In a 2013 interview, bassist Mike Dirnt finally revealed that the group was in fact Green Day, mentioning that Money Money 2020 was worked upon alongside other Green Day projects in the mid-'00s.

== Members ==
- Fink – vocals, lead guitar (2003–2005, 2020–2021)
- Van Gough – vocals, bass guitar (2003–2005, 2020–2021)
- The Snoo – vocals, drums (2003–2005, 2020–2021)
- Z – keyboards, backing vocals (2003–2005, 2020–2021)
- Captain Underpants – keytar, backing vocals (2003–2005, 2020–2021)
- Balducci – rhythm guitar, backing vocals (2003–2005, 2020–2021)

== Discography ==
=== Studio albums ===
Title	Album details
Money Money 2020	Released: September 30, 2003; Label: Adeline, Reprise; Format: CD, vinyl
Money Money 2020 Part II: We Told Ya So!	Released: December 4, 2020; Label: Warner, Joe Robot; Format: Streaming, CD, vinyl

=== Extended plays ===
Title	Details
Trans Am (EP)	Released: November 20, 2020; Label: Joe Robot; Format: Streaming

=== DVDs ===
Title	Details
Disease Is Punishment	First Release: 2003 (released as a bonus DVD with the pressing of Money Money 2020); Standalone Release: 2004; Label: Warner, Adeline; Format: DVD

=== Music videos ===
Title	Album	Link
Supermodel Robots	Money Money 2020	here
Hungry Hungry Models	Money Money 2020	here
Joe Robot	Money Money 2020	here
Teenagers From Mars	Money Money 2020	here
The Prophecy	Money Money 2020 Part II: We Told Ya So!	here
Degenerate	Money Money 2020 Part II: We Told Ya So!	here
Fentanyl	Money Money 2020 Part II: We Told Ya So!	here
Threat Level Midnight	Money Money 2020 Part II: We Told Ya So!	here
Trans Am	Money Money 2020 Part II: We Told Ya So!	here
Asphyxia	Money Money 2020 Part II: We Told Ya So!	here
