= Kill the DJ =

Single by Green Day

from the album ¡Uno!
- Released: August 14, 2012
- Recorded: February 14–June 26, 2012 at Jingletown Studios in Oakland, California
- Genre: Dance-punk
- Length: 3:43
- Label: Reprise; Warner Bros.
- Songwriters: Mirwais Ahmadzaï; Billie Joe Armstrong; Mike Dirnt; Tré Cool
- Producers: Rob Cavallo; Green Day

Green Day singles chronology
"Oh Love" (2012)	"Kill the DJ" (2012)	"Let Yourself Go" (2012)

Music video
- "Kill the DJ" on YouTube

"Kill the DJ" is a song by American rock band Green Day. It is the fifth track on their ninth studio album, ¡Uno! (2012), and was released as the second single, on August 14, 2012. It is also the second from the ¡Uno!, ¡Dos! & ¡Tré! trilogy. The song was recorded at Jingletown Studios from February 14 to June 26, 2012, and was released on the record labels Reprise Records and Warner Bros. A music video, directed by Samuel Bayer, was released on September 4, 2012.

The song takes influences from dance music, a departure for the band. "Kill the DJ" was compared to the Clash albums Sandinista! (1980) and Combat Rock (1982), as well as the output of the band the Rapture. "Kill the DJ" was based on "static and noise"; it was an "imagery of waterboarding and torture straight into the dance club". The song appeared on charts worldwide and received mixed reviews from critics.

== Production and release ==
Green Day began to record material for the albums ¡Uno!, ¡Dos! and ¡Tré! on February 14, 2012. During the sessions, Mike Dirnt asked the frontman Billie Joe Armstrong to write a song with a "four-on-the-floor" rhythm. After the release of "Oh Love", the lead single from the album trilogy on July 16, 2012, the band revealed the artwork of "Kill the DJ" during a press release on July 30, 2012. The band performed the song eight days ahead of its release at a secret show held at the Echoplex on August 6, 2012.

BBC Radio 1 presenter Zane Lowe played the censored version of "Kill the DJ" on August 13, 2012. The next day, the single was made available on the iTunes Store. The song's accompanying music video premiered on YouTube on September 4, 2012, to coincide with the release of the album trilogy's third single "Let Yourself Go" on September 5. A teaser was previously uploaded on the channel on August 29, 2012.

== Theme and composition ==
"Kill the DJ"
The sample contains a guitar-based, dance-punk melody with repetition of lines which was described to be "spikier" musically and more "barbed" lyrically than the predecessor "Oh Love"

"Kill the DJ" is a dance-punk song that Armstrong states is close to "straight-up dance music" with a four-on-the-floor rhythm; he compared the overall production of the song to the Clash's 1980 album, Sandinista!, Ian Dury's "Sex & Drugs & Rock & Roll", and Tom Tom Club's "Genius of Love".

The band said that while producing the song, they attempted to find out "how to make dance music" without turning themselves into a dance act. Armstrong said it was the first time the band had written a dance song. Michael Roffman of Consequence of Sound compared the song with the works of the Rapture, and the Clash's 1982 album, Combat Rock; he said it was "strictly for basement dancefloors everywhere". According to Armstrong, the lyrics of "Kill the DJ" can be considered as "a sweeping political statement" rather than being interpreted as "a comment on electronic music figures". He told Rolling Stone the song is about "static and noise ... Like this government cannot, will not, agree with itself. They refuse to make it work. Right, left—it doesn’t matter. It blows your mind and pisses you off. It’s a song about being drunk, going through this chaos, feeling fucked up and all you want to do is get more drunk". Dirnt was inspired to create a dance song in the vein of Blondie's "Heart of Glass", or a song from Michael Jackson's Off the Wall album.

Todd Martens of Los Angeles Times wrote that the word DJ in "Kill the DJ" does not signify a real DJ but another figure. He compared "Kill the DJ" to "The Static Age", a song on Green Day's album 21st Century Breakdown (2009), which was "a foaming-at-the-mouth guitar rant that everyone—pundits, politicians, celebrities—should stop babbling and shut up". He added, "[Kill the DJ] drops some cursory nods to war and religion in the opening bars, but soon brings the imagery of waterboarding and torture straight into the dance club".

== Music video ==
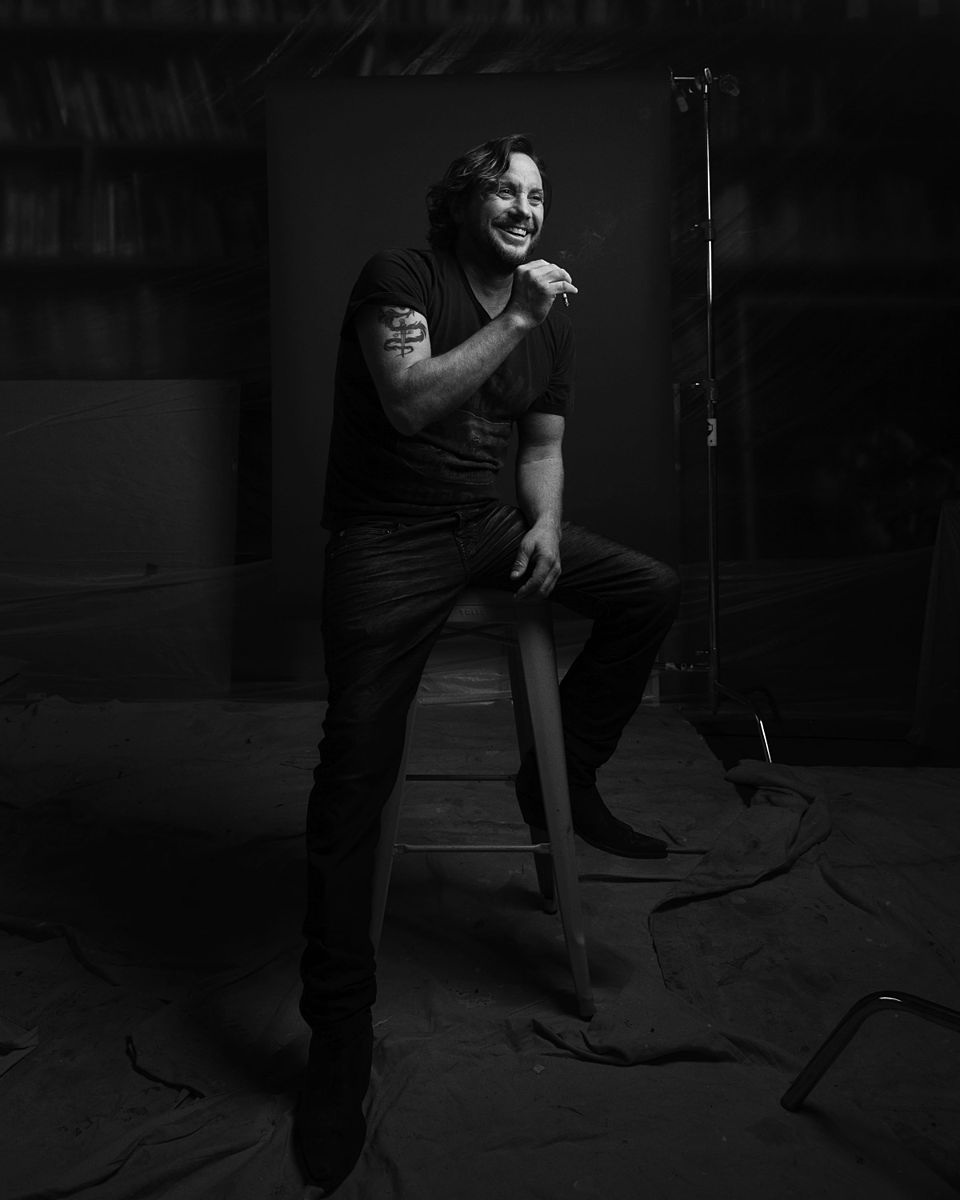
Samuel Bayer, the band's longtime collaborator, directed the music video.

The accompanying music video for "Kill the DJ" was directed by Green Day's longtime collaborator Samuel Bayer, who previously directed the clip for the band's previous single, "Oh Love", and all the videos for their album American Idiot (2004). The band announced the release of the clip with a teaser video which was uploaded to their YouTube channel on August 29, 2012. The teaser video featured several scenes from the video and a brief sample of the ending of the track. The full video premiered on September 4, 2012. The video starts with a black-and-white clip of the band riding motorcycles through a desert and finding their way into a nightclub. The band members walk through the club while others dance. As they perform in the club, two young women fight and some bottles are broken. Near the end, several dancers have a "bloodbath"; they are depicted with blood on their faces and clothes while they continue to dance.

== Critical reception ==
"Kill the DJ" was included in Zane Lowe's Hottest Tracks of 2012; it finished second, while "Calling (Lose My Mind)" by Sebastian Ingrosso and Alesso came first. Jack Brad, writing for Hive Magazine, said the song was a "fun and funky" track showcasing a different musical direction for the band. He also said it encompassed a "catchy melody and ... infectious chorus" that proves the band was capable of experimenting with new musical styles on every new production, citing Warning (2000) and Nimrod (1997) as examples. David Renshaw from Gigwise said "Kill the DJ"'s music video was not as violent as previous clips by the band; he said, "those who attended the band's brilliant Reading Festival set in August will testify" that things can get more violent than scenes in the video.

David Greenwald of Billboard magazine described "Kill the DJ" as a "profanity-laced and Clash-channeling" track. Zara Golden of VH1 said of the video, "The hit is only a symbolic one, though, and the only real violence to be had here is a slaying guitar riff. Rather, this is an assault against the dubbed-out sound that seems to be dominating today’s air waves, Green Day’s own and only pretend bloody dubstep demolition." Todd Martens of Los Angeles Times, criticizing the single, said, "It's all played rather straight. 'I'll pick up what's left in the club,' Armstrong sings suspiciously, and the video released Tuesday doesn't do much to present the song as a statement". Alex Young, writing for Consequence of Sound said the opening clips of the band driving motorbikes were irrelevant. Young said, "There’s also a random scene of the band riding dirt bikes through the desert, which doesn't really make sense in the context of the video but seems like a good way to spend an excess video budget".

== Credits and Personnel ==
- Songwriting: Mirwais Ahmadzaï, Billie Joe Armstrong, Mike Dirnt, Tré Cool
- Production: Rob Cavallo, Green Day

== Chart positions ==
Chart (2012)	Peak position
Belgium (Ultratip Bubbling Under Flanders)	12
Belgium (Ultratip Bubbling Under Wallonia)	18
Italy (FIMI)	92
South Korea (Gaon International Chart)	12
Switzerland Airplay (Schweizer Hitparade)	79
UK Singles (OCC)	110

== Track listing ==
- Digital download
1. "Kill The DJ" (Explicit) (3:41)
- Promotional CD
1. "Kill The DJ" (Edit) (3:44)
2. "Kill The DJ" (Album Version) (3:43)
