= Bill Schneider (musician) =

American bassist

- Born: William Schneider; June 17, 1971 (age 54)
- Genres: Punk rock; pop punk; alternative rock
- Occupations: Musician; guitar/bass technician; songwriter; singer; storekeeper; touring manager
- Instrument: Bass guitar
- Years active: 1990–present
- Labels: Lookout!; Adeline; Recess; Reprise; Warner
- Member of: Pinhead Gunpowder; The Coverups
- Formerly of: The Influents; Monsula; The Skinflutes; Uranium 9 Volt; Sawhorse
- Website: brokenguitarsoakland.com

William Schneider (born June 17, 1971) is an American musician, guitar technician, songwriter, touring manager, and music shop owner. He has played bass in the punk rock band Pinhead Gunpowder since 1990, as well as providing vocals and writing the lyrics to the song "Backyard Flames". He has been in other bands such as the Influents, Monsula, Uranium 9 Volt, Sawhorse, the Skinflutes, and the Coverups. He worked as guitar and bass technician for Green Day's Billie Joe Armstrong and Mike Dirnt on their albums Nimrod, Saviors, Revolution Radio, ¡Uno! and Warning, and currently works as the band's tour manager.
