= Foxboro Hot Tubs =

American garage rock band

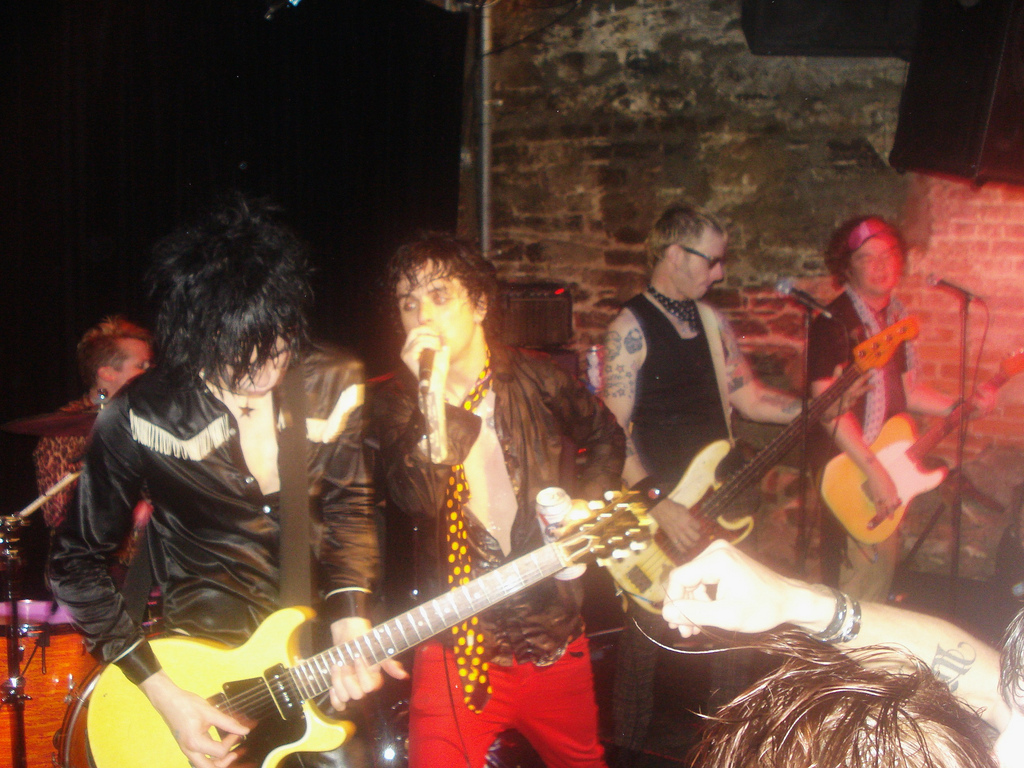
- Foxboro Hot Tubs performing at the Bowery Electric on April 25, 2010 in New York City.

Background information
- Origin: San Francisco Bay Area – Oakland, California, U.S.
- Genres: Garage rock revival; indie rock; garage punk; punk rock
- Years active: 2007–present
- Labels: Jingle Town
- Spinoff of: Green Day
- Members: Reverend Strychnine Twitch; Michelangelo; The Professor; Frosco Lee; Jason Freese; Chinatown Jukebox
- Website: foxborohottubs.com

Foxboro Hot Tubs is the garage rock side project of Green Day, formed in 2007. The band includes all members of Green Day, as well as their touring members Jason White, Jason Freese, and Kevin Preston, who is also in Prima Donna. Their first and currently only album, Stop Drop and Roll!!!, was released on April 22, 2008. The name "Foxboro Hot Tubs" is the alias Green Day uses to book secret shows. When performing as Foxboro Hot Tubs, Billie Joe Armstrong and Jason White go by the names Reverend Strychnine Twitch and Frosco Lee, respectively.

== History ==
=== Background and Stop Drop and Roll!!! (2007–2009) ===
The band was brought to the attention of Green Day fans through messages sent to a select few members of the Idiot Club (Green Day's fan club) in December 2007, with three songs on their website. They formed with the idea that they "love to play music and be spontaneous, and after a few late-night jams and a few too many bottles of wine, we were inspired to record some rockin' eight-track recordings". Although the band's history is, as yet, unknown, they comprise the official and backing members of Green Day (with the exception of Preston), who are performing "garage" music under a nom de plume.

As speculation started to peak, Green Day confirmed that they were the Foxboro Hot Tubs, with Billie Joe Armstrong stating, "The only similarity between Foxboro Hot Tubs and Green Day is that we are the same band". He also went on to explain where the name "Foxboro Hot Tubs" came from, "The Foxboro Hot Tubs were a place we used to sneak booze and chicks into late at night. But most of the time it was just 'dude soup'." Foxboro is a housing development located in Hercules, California.

On December 8, 2007, the Green Day site released six tracks, via streaming and downloadable MP3 formats, free of charge to the listener. Five days later, on December 13, the MP3s were taken off the site, which then displayed just a clock. The MP3s were reinstated on December 16, but were again removed and replaced with the clock; later the website was changed to simply redirect to the band's Myspace. All the tracks (apart from "Highway 1") were included on the band's debut album, Stop Drop and Roll!!!, with the samples at the beginning removed. Soon after, the song "Mother Mary" became a hit on alternative rock radio, hitting No. 16 on the Billboard Modern Rock Tracks chart. "The Pedestrian" was released as the second single off the album.

The band made their television debut on Last Call with Carson Daly, with a week dedicated to Green Day, with them performing at the end of every show on the week beginning June 15, 2009, and Green Day played on June 19, 2009. During this performance, they played "Stop Drop and Roll" and "Mother Mary", bridging the two songs together.

=== Continued activity (2010–present) ===
On April 23, 2010, the band played their first new song since 2008 at a show in New York City called "Fuck Time". On October 31, 2009, during the 21st Century Breakdown World Tour as Green Day, the band performed a brief set as Foxboro Hot Tubs before the support band as a Halloween surprise at the Manchester MEN Arena.

On October 26, 2013, Foxboro Hot Tubs played a secret show at Eli's Mile High Club in Oakland, California. Along with performing a majority of their album, they performed several songs from Green Day's album ¡Dos!. On March 14, 2014, the band performed for the SXSW festival in Austin, Texas, at Brazos Hall.

As the Coverups, the band performed a few Foxboro Hot Tubs songs on December 6, 2019, at a small show at the Tiki Bar in Costa Mesa, California.

== Band members ==
- Reverend Strychnine Twitch – lead vocals
- Michaelangelo – bass guitar, backing vocals
- The Professor – drums, percussion, backing vocals
- Frosco Lee – lead guitar, backing vocals
- Jason Freese – keyboard, saxophone, flute, backing vocals
- Kevin Preston – rhythm guitar, backing vocals

== Discography ==
Studio album

- Stop Drop and Roll!!! (2008)

Singles

- "Mother Mary" (2008)
- "The Pedestrian" (2008)
- "Stop Drop and Roll" (2008)

EP

- Stop Drop and Roll!!! (2007)
