= Prima Donna (American band) =

American rock and roll band

- Origin: Los Angeles, California
- Genres: Rock and roll, alternative rock, glam punk
- Years active: 2004–present
- Members: Kevin Preston; Aaron Minton; David S. Field; Adam "Lights Out" Levine
- Past members: Erik Arcane; Daniel Nyby
- Website: primadonnarocks.com

Prima Donna are an American rock and roll band from Los Angeles, formed in 2004. The band currently features singer/guitarist Kevin Preston, saxophonist/keyboardist Aaron Minton, drummer David S. Field, and bassist "Lights Out" Levine. The band have released three albums over their career.

== History ==
The band formed in 2004 in Los Angeles with members Kevin Preston, Aaron Minton, Erik Arcane, David S. Field and Daniel Nyby. The band features a unique blend of saxophone, piano and organ alongside guitars, drums and bass to create what has been described as glam punk rock 'n' roll.

The band quickly gained a following and in May 2005, the band went on their first international tour in Europe with Texas Terri, with a quickly produced debut album entitled Kiss Kiss which was only sold at live shows. At the end of 2005, the band went on to play with original Sex Pistols bassist Glen Matlock and the Philistines American tour.

In 2008, the band recorded and released their true debut album, After Hours on September 2, 2008, which was produced by Messiaz and Prima Donna and was recorded at Reef Recorders. This album features re-recordings of tracks that were featured on Kiss Kiss. Kevin Preston would go on to join the Green Day side project, Foxboro Hot Tubs as their rhythm guitar player for live shows, which further boosted the profile of Prima Donna.

Prima Donna spent most of 2009 on tour, with US tours with Eddie and the Hot Rods and Duane Peters Gunfight. They would then go on to their highest profile slots yet, supporting Green Day on their European leg of their 21st Century Breakdown World Tour, with Kevin later joining the Foxboro Hot Tubs at a secret show in London during October 2009. They would go on to support Green Day on tour in 2010 throughout the Asian leg of the tour. Daniel Nyby departed the band around this time, and was replaced by "Lights Out" Levine. After this period of extended touring, the band started recording their next album with Chris Dugan at Jingletown Studios in Oakland, California.

Over the years, Steven Van Zandt has featured three Prima Donna songs as the 'Coolest Song in the World This Week' on his Sirius radio channel the Underground Garage.

The fourth album by the band was self-titled and released in March 2018. Kevin Preston and David S. Field would then go on to play live with Billie Joe Armstrong's solo project the Longshot.

== Members ==
=== Current members ===
- Kevin Preston – vocals, guitar (2004–present)
- Aaron Minton – saxophone, keyboards (2004–present)
- David S. Field – drums, percussion (2004–present)
- "Lights Out" Levine – bass guitar (2010–present)

=== Former members ===
- Daniel Nyby – bass guitar (2004–2010)

== Discography ==
=== After Hours (2008) ===
2008 album on Acetate Records. Produced by Messiaz and Prima Donna. Tracked at Reef Recorders by Josh Achziger. Overdubbed and mixed at Toneduff Studio by Bruce Duff and Frank Meyer. Mastered at Little Red Book by Mark Chalecki. Photography by Sawa. CD design and layout by Victor Dawahare/Dynolux Design.

Track listing

All tracks are written by Kevin Preston, except where noted.

No.	Title	Length
1.	"Soul Stripper"	3:55
2.	"Demoted"	2:16
3.	"I Don't Want You To Love Me"	2:10
4.	"Stray Doll"	2:39
5.	"Double Crosser"	2:34
6.	"Lady Strange" (Preston/Arcane)	3:17
7.	"Doll Face Baby"	3:08
8.	"Everything's Wrong" (Music by Minton. Lyrics by Preston.)	2:46
9.	"Crucify"	3:33
10.	"Dummy Luv"	3:35
Total length:		28:48

=== Bless this Mess (2012) ===
This album was released in February 2012 to positive reviews. While retaining a largely glam rock sound, this album also contains British Invasion, new wave and surf rock influences.

Track listing

All tracks are written by Kevin Preston, except where noted.

No.	Title	Length
1.	"Sociopath" (Music by Preston. Lyrics by Preston/Field)	2:51
2.	"Maxine"	2:48
3.	"Feral Children"	4:49
4.	"Broken"	4:52
5.	"Let The Games Begin" (Music by Levine/Arcane/Preston. Lyrics by Prima Donna.)	3:04
6.	"Bless This Mess"	4:23
7.	"Miss Avenue" (Music by Preston/Minton. Lyrics by Preston.)	3:34
8.	"Starging Daggers"	2:33
9.	"Crismon Lust"	4:09
10.	"Tryin'" (Music by Minton. Lyrics by Preston/Minton)	4:01
11.	"Puta, Te Amo" (Music by Preston. Lyrics by Prima Donna.)	2:56
12.	"She Says" (Music by Minton/Arcane/Field/Levine. Lyrics by Preston/Minton/Field/Levine)	5:59
Total length:		45:43

=== Nine Lives and Forty-Fives (2015) ===
Track listing

All tracks are written by Kevin Preston, except where noted.

No.	Title	Length
1.	"Pretty Little Head"
2.	"Deathless"
3.	"Born Yesterday"
4.	"Living in Sin"
5.	"Rubbish"
6.	"Rock and Roll Is Dead" (Written by Alex Carlin/Jon Rubin/Tommy Dunbar.)
7.	"Like Hell"
8.	"I'm On Fire" (Written by Dwight Twilley.)
9.	"Tattooed Love Girls"
10.	"Rip Her to Shreds" (Written by Chris Stein/Debbie Harry.)
11.	"Eat Your Heart Out"

=== Prima Donna (2018) ===
Track listing

No.	Title	Writer(s)	Length
1.	"4 Real"	Preston/Field/Minton/Levine	3:21
2.	"Press Your Luck"	Preston/Levine	2:48
3.	"Automatic"	Preston	3:20
4.	"Vulture Culture"	Preston/Minton	3:08
5.	"Recurring Nightmare"	Preston	2:48
6.	"Not for Nothing"	Preston/Field	2:49
7.	"Until I Break Loose"	Preston/Field/Minton/Levine	3:14
8.	"Love from Above"	Preston/Levine	3:18
9.	"Year of the Rat"	Preston/Field	3:08
10.	"Give It Up"	Preston/Minton	2:23
11.	"Sound the Alarm"	Preston	2:54
Total length:			33:06

== Singles ==
=== Gimme Christmas (2018) ===
7 inch single recorded containing the single Gimme Christmas and the B-side Mistletoe Blues. Re-released in December 2020.

=== Cruel Summer (2019) ===
Single containing a cover of The Bangles' Cruel Summer.

=== Atomic Love (2021) ===
Single containing the titular track, and the B-side He's a Rebel.

== Reviews ==
- Kiss Kiss album:
  - High Bias:
  - Veglam:
  - Full Frontal: After Hours album:
  - Sonic Ruin:
  - Big Wheel:
  - No Front Teeth:
- Live performances:
  - Sugarbuzz magazine:
  - Skratch magazine:
    - October 2005
    - February 2005
