= Cardinal Newman Catholic School =

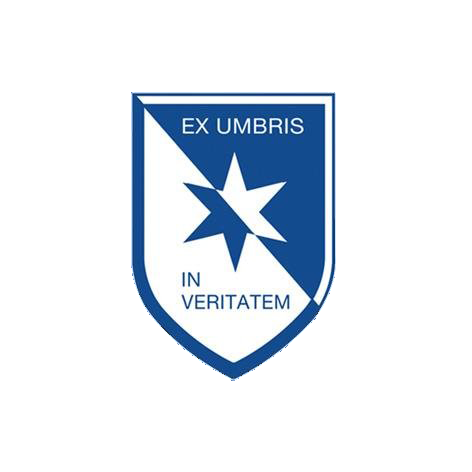

Location
- Warden Hill Road; Luton, Bedfordshire, LU2 7AE; England

Information
- Type: Academy
- Motto: "Ex Umbris in Veritatem" (Out of the Shadows, into the Truth)
- Religious affiliation: Roman Catholic
- Established: September 1968
- Trust: St. Thomas Catholic Academies Trust (STCAT)
- Department for Education URN: 142310 Tables
- Ofsted: Reports
- Headteacher: Helen Fay
- Staff: 100+ teaching, 30+ support
- Gender: Mixed
- Age: 11 to 18
- Enrolment: approx. 1600 as of September 2025
- Capacity: 1800
- Language: English
- Houses: Wiseman, Hinsley, Manning, Vaughan, Acton, Godfrey, Griffin, Heenan and Hume
- Colours: Dark blue, black & white
- Publication: Newman News
- Website: https://www.cardinalnewmanschool.net

Cardinal Newman Catholic School is a Roman Catholic Academy that caters for pupils aged between 11 and 18, located in the Warden Hills area of Luton, Bedfordshire, England. Opened in September 1968, the current headteacher is Helen Fay, with the deputy heads being Miss C Daly and Mr D Martin. There are currently over 1600 students on roll. The school is named after a cardinal of the Roman Church. John Henry Newman.

As the only Roman Catholic secondary school in the whole of Luton, the school is constantly oversubscribed with over 400 applicants yearly, yet with 270 places to offer. Cardinal Newman was the only secondary school in Luton to have its own sixth form until 2011 when Stockwood Park Academy (then Barnfield South Academy) launched a sixth form. Its sixth form has over 150 places to offer students from both inside and outside the school.

Sixth Form logo

== Specialisms and academy status ==
Specialist Science Symbol

The school has previously acquired Specialist Science Status with Science. This award has given the school funding to build and complete a new sixth form and science block extension, install a new computer and server network across the whole school, install brand new equipment including SMART Boards in many classrooms, purchase new equipment in many departments, especially in maths and science and the renovation of certain areas of the school site including the PE block. Despite the specialist schools programme ending, the school continues to offer science as specialisms.

Previously a voluntary aided school, in September 2015 Cardinal Newman Catholic School converted to academy status.

== Ofsted report ==
Its last Ofsted report gave the school excellent feedback, including talking about the 'good quality of the teaching in lessons' and the 'very good management and leadership in the school'. Main areas for improvement included the ICT provision and the induction process of new students. These areas and others, are currently being addressed and substantially improved with the help of funding and support from the feeder schools and the board of governors.

== Notable former pupils ==
- Kingsley Black, professional footballer for Luton Town & Northern Ireland
- Kevin Blackwell, professional footballer and manager
- Lauren Bruton, professional footballer for Arsenal W.F.C. & England Women
- Gary Doherty, professional footballer for Luton Town, Tottenham Hotspur, Norwich City and Republic of Ireland
- Janoi Donacien, professional footballer for Ipswich Town & Saint Lucia
- Kevin Foley, professional footballer for Luton Town, Wolverhampton Wanderers and Republic of Ireland
- Liam George, professional footballer for Luton Town
- Keith Keane, professional footballer for Luton Town
- Cliff McNish, author
- Conor Travers, the youngest Countdown champion winning at the age of 14 years studied for his GCSEs and then moved to do his A Levels at Luton Sixth Form College
