= List of Countdown champions =

Since Series 54 (2006), series champions receive the Richard Whiteley Memorial Trophy.

This is a list of champions on the game show Countdown. These are players who have won up to eight games and scored enough points to qualify for their series' finals. Here, they were one of eight contestants invited back to compete in a knockout tournament to decide who will become the series champion. This list also includes winners of Champion of Champions tournaments and the winner of Series 33, which was designated a "Supreme Championship".

There was only one full series in 2005 because of Richard Whiteley's death — his final series, Series 53, was recorded before he was hospitalised with pneumonia. Series 54 began four months later on 31 October 2005 and, having started very late in the year, was extended to last until 26 May 2006. Series champions from this series onwards are awarded the Richard Whiteley Memorial Trophy. Up until Series 83, champions were also awarded the complete leather-bound set of the Oxford English Dictionary (although the Series 31 champion, David Acton, turned the prize down due to his strict veganism and instead opted to take it in CD-ROM form, donating the sizeable cash difference to a local school).

== Champions ==
Year	Series	Winner
1982	1	Joyce Cansfield
1983	2	Ash Haji
1983	3	Andrew Guy
1984	4	Brian Hudson
1984	Champion of Champions I: Mark Nyman	
1984	5	Peter Evans
1985	6	Darryl Francis
1985	7	Ian Bebbington
1986	8	Clive Spate
1986	Champion of Champions II: Clive Freedman	
1986	9	David Trace
1986	10	Harvey Freeman
1987	11	John Clarke
1987	12	Stephen Balment
1987	Champion of Champions III: Harvey Freeman	
1987	13	Hilary Hopper
1987	14	Nic Brown
1988	15	Dick Green
1988	16	Tony Vick
1989	Champion of Champions IV: Nic Brown	
1989	17	Lawrence Pearse
1989	18	Rajaretnam 'Yoga' Yogasagarar
1990	19	Michael Wareham
1990	20	Liz Barber
1991	Champion of Champions V: Tim Morrissey	
1991	21	Barry Grossman
1991	22	Chris Waddington
1992	23	Gareth Williams
1992	24	Wayne Summers
1993	Champion of Champions VI: Wayne Summers	
1993	25	Don Reid
1993	26	Andy Bodle
1994	27	David Elias
1994	28	Damian Eadie
1995	Champion of Champions VII: Don Reid	
1995	29	Darren Shacklady
1995	30	Verity Joubert
1996	31	David Acton
1996	32	Alan Sinclair
1996	Champion of Champions VIII: Chris Rogers	
1996	33 (Supreme Championship)	Harvey Freeman
1997	34	Huw Morgan
1997	35	Peter Cashmore
1997	36	Tony Baylis
1997	37	Ray McPhie
1998	Champion of Champions IX: Natascha Kearsey	
1998	38	John Ashmore
1998	39	Kate Ogilvie
1999	40	Terence English
1999	41	Scott Mearns
1999	Champion of Champions X: Scott Mearns	
2000	42	Michael Calder
2000	43	Graham Nash
2001	44	Stuart Wood
2001	45	John Rawnsley
2001	46	Ben Wilson
2002	47	Chris Wills
2002	48	Julian Fell
2003	Champion of Champions XI: Graham Nash	
2003	49	John Davies
2003	50	Chris Cummins
2004	51	Stewart Holden
2004	52	Mark Tournoff
2005	53	John Mayhew
2006	54	Conor Travers
2006	Champion of Champions XII: Paul Gallen	
2006	55	Richard Brittain
2007	56	Nick Wainwright
2007	57	Craig Beevers
2008	58	David O'Donnell
2008	59	Junaid Mubeen
2009	Champion of Champions XIII: Steven Briers	
2009	60	Kirk Bevins
2009	61	Chris Davies
2010	62	Oliver Garner
2010	63	Jack Hurst
2011	64	Edward McCullagh
2011	65	Graeme Cole
2012	66	Jack Worsley
2012	67	Paul James
2013	30th Birthday Champion: Conor Travers	
2013	68	Giles Hutchings
2013	69	Callum Todd
2014	70	Mark Murray
2014	71	Dan McColm
2015	72	Tom Cappleman
2015	73	Jonathan Wynn
2016	Champion of Champions XIV: Dylan Taylor	
2016	74	Paul Erdunast
2016	75	Martin Hurst
2017	76	Stephen Read
2017	77	Tom Chafer-Cook
2018	78	Zarte Siempre
2018	79	Mike Daysley
2019	Champion of Champions XV: Zarte Siempre	
2019	80	Dinos Sfyris
2019	81	James Haughton
2020	82	Luke Johnson-Davies
2021
2021	83	Adam Latchford
2021	84	Ahmed Mohamed
2022	85	Dan Byrom
2022	86	Tom Stevenson
2023	Champion of Champions XVI: Ahmed Mohamed	
2023	87	Ronan Higginson
2023	88	Harry Savage
2024	89	Arthur Page
2024	90	Fiona Wood
2025	91	Rhys Jones
2025	92	Jase Cullen
2026	93	Patrick Thompson
