= Joyce Cansfield =

English crossword compiler (1929–2019)

- Born: Mary Joyce Patrick; 8 October 1929; Reigate, Surrey, England
- Died: 12 October 2019 (aged 90); Ringmer, East Sussex, England
- Other name: Machiavelli
- Education: Westfield College, University of London
- Occupation: Crossword compiler
- Employers: BBC; The Times; University of Leeds
- Known for: The Listener
- Television: Countdown
- Spouse: Mike Cansfield (m. 1974)

Mary Joyce Cansfield (née Patrick; 8 October 1929 – 12 October 2019) was an English crossword compiler, compiling under the name Machiavelli for The Listener.

== Early life ==
Mary Joyce Patrick was born in Reigate, Surrey, England on 8 October 1929, as the younger child to Geoffrey Patrick (1899–1965), a solicitor at Somerset House in Strand, London, and his wife, Mary Ada "May" (née Dulake; 1901–1974), a housewife. She had an elder sister, Patricia "Pat" Elliott (née Patrick; born 1927).

Cansfield studied for her undergraduate degree in statistics at Westfield College, University of London.

== Career ==
Cansfield became known as a crossword compiler, compiling under the name Machiavelli for the BBC's weekly magazine The Listener.

Cansfield set over 1,000 puzzles for The Times daily newspaper.

Cansfield played Scrabble, a word game, since 1958, having been introduced to the game by her cousins while staying in a log cabin in Canada. She was the UK National Scrabble Champion in 1980. She achieved the highest score in a tournament with 855 in a qualifying game for the 1986 National Scrabble Championship. She competed in the 1991 World Championships. She was featured in the Guinness Book of Records with the highest-ever triple word score of 301. In 2003, she won the Mensa Games Scrabble Championship for the fifth time. She was a member of the Aireborough Scrabble Club.

Cansfield appeared on the ITV game show Winner Takes All in 1976.

Cansfield won the first ever series of the Channel 4 game show Countdown in 1982. She appeared on the 500th episode of Countdown, which was broadcast on 2 February 1987. She appeared on Countdown Masters in 1989. She appeared on three episodes of Countdown in 1996.

Cansfield was named the 1983 Brain of Mensa, hosted by Magnus Magnusson, the presenter of the BBC quiz show Mastermind.

Cansfield appeared on two episodes of the BBC game show Catchword in 1988.

Cansfield, in her early career, was involved in the running of an early mainframe computer at the UK's Dental Estimates Board in Eastbourne, East Sussex. Later on, she worked at the University of Leeds as a statistician.

== Personal life ==
Cansfield (then Patrick) married James Mike Cansfield (born 1929), a printer, in Lewes, East Sussex in October 1974.

Cansfield died in Ringmer, East Sussex on 12 October 2019, four days after her 90th birthday, following a long illness. She was survived by her husband. Her funeral service took place at The Ceremony Hall, Wealden Crematorium on 28 October 2019.
