= Simon Langley-Evans =

British academic nutritionist and researcher

- Education: Icknield High School, Luton Sixth Form College
- Alma mater: Royal Holloway and Bedford New College, University of Southampton
- Awards: The Nutrition Society Silver Medal
- Scientific career
- Fields: Human nutrition
- Workplaces: University of Southampton, United Medical and Dental Schools of Guy's and St Thomas' Hospitals, University of Northampton, University of Nottingham
- Thesis: Central activity of glucocorticoids and glucocorticoid receptors in the genetically obese Zucker rat (fa/fa) (1990)

Simon Langley-Evans is a British scientist who is Emeritus Professor of Human Nutrition at the University of Nottingham.

== Education ==
Langley-Evans attended Icknield High School and Luton Sixth Form College. He obtained his BSc in Biochemistry and Microbiology from Royal Holloway and Bedford New College, University of London in 1986. His PhD was from the University of Southampton (1990), supervised by Professor David York and examined by Nancy Rothwell. He obtained a PGCHE from the University of Nottingham in 2004.

== Career ==
Langley-Evans was the head of the University of Nottingham School of Biosciences between 2016 and 2021.

Langley-Evans was the winner of the Nutrition Society Silver Medal in 2005.

In 2012 he was awarded a DSc from the University of Nottingham in recognition of his contribution to research into the early life origins of adult disease. His principal contribution was the development of experimental models to test the hypothesis that variation in maternal nutrition during pregnancy could programme long-term health and disease. A long-term champion of equality, diversity and inclusion, for which he was awarded the Vice Chancellor's Medal in 2016, Langley-Evans has been outspoken in criticising declining standards of scholarship in the nutrition field and has written about the lack of care taken by the academic community to prevent burnout and poor mental health.

In addition to publishing more than 150 papers in scientific journals and has contributed to several books on early life programming as editor and author, Langley-Evans is the author of an academic textbook entitled Nutrition, Health and Disease: A Lifespan Approach, of which the third edition was published in 2021, and was the longest-serving editor-in-chief of the Journal of Human Nutrition and Dietetics between 2012 and 2023. Outreach work to further understanding of nutrition science has included participation in I'm A Scientist Get Me Out Of Here and provision of specialist advice for a children's book. Langley-Evans is also the author of a number of works of fiction, including two novels and other works published under the name of S.C. Langley. Langley-Evans was a semi-finalist in the BBC Radio 4 Brain of Britain, 2026 series.

== Selected publications ==
- Lloyd, L. J.; Langley-Evans, S. C.; McMullen, S. (2012). "Childhood obesity and risk of the adult metabolic syndrome: A systematic review". International Journal of Obesity. 36 (1): 1–11. doi:10.1038/ijo.2011.186. PMC 3255098. PMID 22041985. (open access) (Cited 412 times, according to Google Scholar. )
- McMullen, S.; Langley-Evans, S.C.; Gambling, L.; Lang, C.; Swali, A.; McArdle, H.J. (2012). "A common cause for a common phenotype: The gatekeeper hypothesis in fetal programming". Medical Hypotheses. 78 (1): 88–94. doi:10.1016/j.mehy.2011.09.047. PMC 3426771. PMID 22047985. S2CID 13554528.
- McMullen, Sarah; Langley-Evans, Simon C. (2005). "Maternal low-protein diet in rat pregnancy programs blood pressure through sex-specific mechanisms". American Journal of Physiology. Regulatory, Integrative and Comparative Physiology. 288 (1): R85–R90. doi:10.1152/ajpregu.00435.2004. PMID 15374820.
- Langley, Simon C.; Jackson, Alan A. (1994). "Increased Systolic Blood Pressure in Adult Rats Induced by Fetal Exposure to Maternal Low Protein Diets". Clinical Science. 86 (2): 217–222. doi:10.1042/cs0860217. PMID 8143432.
