= Tom Crawford (mathematician) =

British mathematician and YouTuber

- Born: Thomas Joseph Crawford

Academic background
- Education: St John's College, Oxford (BA, MA); Queen's College, Cambridge (PhD)
- Thesis: An experimental study of the spread of buoyant water into a rotating environment (2017)
- Doctoral advisor: Paul Linden

YouTube information
- Channel: Tom Rocks Maths
- Genre: Popular mathematics
- Subscribers: 252,000
- Views: 29.0 million
- Last updated: 3 September 2026
- Website: tomrocksmaths.com

Thomas Joseph Crawford, better known online as Tom Rocks Maths, is a British mathematician and YouTuber. He lectures in mathematics at both the University of Cambridge, where he completed his PhD in 2016, and the University of Oxford. He is also a supervisor at Robinson College, Cambridge, where he is a teaching fellow, and at Selwyn College, Cambridge. He is also a fellow by special election at St Edmund Hall, Oxford, the Access and Outreach Associate for STEM at St John's College, Oxford, where he completed his bachelor's degree, and the public engagement lead at the university's Department for Continuing Education.

Crawford began media communication work during his PhD thesis when he hosted a BBC radio show. After he filmed a video explaining a particular part of vector calculus to try help his students, they suggested he start a YouTube channel to share such videos, which eventually led to him creating Tom Rocks Maths. After his PhD, he also worked with The Naked Scientists and produced a series called Naked Maths, which led him to become known as the Naked Mathematician. Since its creation, Tom Rocks Maths has surpassed 250,000 subscribers and through it he has collaborated with other creators such as Numberphile, the largest popular mathematics YouTube channel.

== Education ==
Crawford matriculated at St John's College, Oxford in 2008 where he studied for a bachelor's degree in mathematics. In 2012, he matriculated at Queen's College, Cambridge, where he completed a PhD in fluid dynamics in 2016, which was published in May 2017. His PhD supervisor was Professor Paul Linden. He was the first person in his family to go to university. While he was a PhD student, he was given the opportunity to host a BBC radio show about mathematics, which began his interest in media communication in relation to mathematics.

== Career ==
After completing his PhD, Crawford began the Naked Maths series as a spinoff of The Naked Scientists, in which he covered interesting applications and real-world manifestations of mathematics, in order to engage young people and break stereotypes around maths. Through this, he became known as "The Naked Mathematician". As part of this act, he delivered talks at the 2019 Oxford Science Festival wearing only a toga and laurel wreath, where he discussed the mathematics of antiquity. In July 2019, Crawford collaborated with FYFD and the Journal of Fluid Mechanics to produce a series of videos related to fluid mechanics for the American Physical Society Division of Fluid Dynamics' 2017 conference.

In 2025, Crawford was associated with the Multicolour Maths programme which helped people confront their anxiety of maths and broaden its accessibility. In February 2025, Crawford appeared as the mathematician on the game show Countdown as a substitute for Rachel Riley for three weeks, while she filmed for another project. This made him the first ever male mathematician to host the show. In 2026, he published his first book, How Many Pikachus Would It Take to Power a Lightbulb?, through Penguin Random House. The book is about fantasy mathematics, with Crawford using maths to answer absurd hypothetical questions.

After the UK government announced it would ban social media, including YouTube, for those under 16, Crawford spoke against blocking access to YouTube due to its educational value, saying that it was "where we all go to learn", and that, in his opinion, "YouTube isn't social media [but rather] the 2026 version of television". As well as lecturing at the University of Cambridge, Crawford is a teaching fellow at Robinson College, Cambridge, supervising undergraduate mathematics students there and at Selwyn College, Cambridge. As well as lecturing at the University of Oxford, he is also a fellow by special election at St Edmund Hall, the Access and Outreach Associate for STEM at St John's College, and the public engagement lead at the university's Department for Continuing Education.

=== Tom Rocks Maths ===
Crawford chose to start his YouTube channel after he recorded a video to explain a particular part of vector calculus his students were finding tricky. The video was shared between students, who suggested he start a YouTube channel; Crawford reflected that "if students are sharing it themselves, then maybe the way I am explaining things is actually helpful and different". He was also motivated by his experience of media communication from a BBC radio show he made while a PhD student. Crawford has collaborated via the Tom Rocks Maths channel with the New Scientist and Brady Haran's Numberphile, the largest popular mathematics YouTube channel.

One of Crawford's series on his channel is called "Equations Stripped", where he breaks down complex mathematical and physics concepts while progressively removing his clothes. In 2020, Crawford launched his annual essay competition in collaboration with St Edmund Hall, Oxford, where entrants of any age can submit an essay on any maths-related topic. In 2026, Outlook Respawn covered one entry which talked about the use of anime to explain complex topics to a wider audience. In 2024, he derived what he thought to be the cheapest method to complete the Topps sticker album for the UEFA Euro 2024 football tournament, which allowed people to do so for less than £100.

== See also ==
- Hannah Fry
- Michael Stevens
- Matt Parker
- Brady Haran
