= Journal of Human Nutrition and Dietetics =

- Discipline: Nutrition science
- Language: English
- Edited by: Lauren Ball

Publication details
- Former names: Nutrition, Dietetics and Catering, Journal of Human Nutrition
- History: 1982-present
- Publisher: John Wiley & Sons
- Frequency: Bimonthly
- Impact factor: 3.089 (2020)

Standard abbreviations
- ISO 4: J. Hum. Nutr. Diet.

Indexing
- CODEN: JHNDEO
- ISSN: 0952-3871 (print); 1365-277X (web)
- LCCN: sn88038207
- OCLC no.: 18608310

Links
- Journal homepage; Online access; Online archive

The Journal of Human Nutrition and Dietetics is a bimonthly peer-reviewed medical journal covering nutrition science as it relates to humans. It was founded in 1982 and is the official journal of the British Dietetic Association (BDA). The BDA had considered establishing a journal in its early days in the late 1930s but the outbreak of the Second World War halted plans. It was finally founded in 1947 as Nutrition, Dietetics and Catering. After several title changes, publisher John Libbey updated the journal with the title Journal of Human Nutrition, which was the immediate predecessor to the Journal of Human Nutrition and Dietetics. Alison Black oversaw the creation of the new journal in the early 1980s. During this period, a collaboration between the BDA and The Nutrition Society resulted in two separate journals: Human Nutrition: Clinical Nutrition and Human Nutrition: Applied Nutrition. Although the BDA had an interest in Human Nutrition: Clinical Nutrition, it was exclusively managed by the Nutrition Society.

The journal is published by John Wiley & Sons on behalf of the British Dietetic Association. The current editor-in-chief is Lauren Ball (University of Queensland) in 2024. Past editors were Pat Judd, Jane Thomas, Joan Gandy, Ailsa Brotherton and Simon Langley-Evans. Prior to 1988, the Journal of Human Nutrition was the official journal of the British Dietetic Association. According to the Journal Citation Reports, the journal has a 2022 impact factor of 3.30, ranking it 58th out of 89 journals in the category "Nutrition & Dietetics".
