= Kirk Bevins =

English darts referee (born 1986)

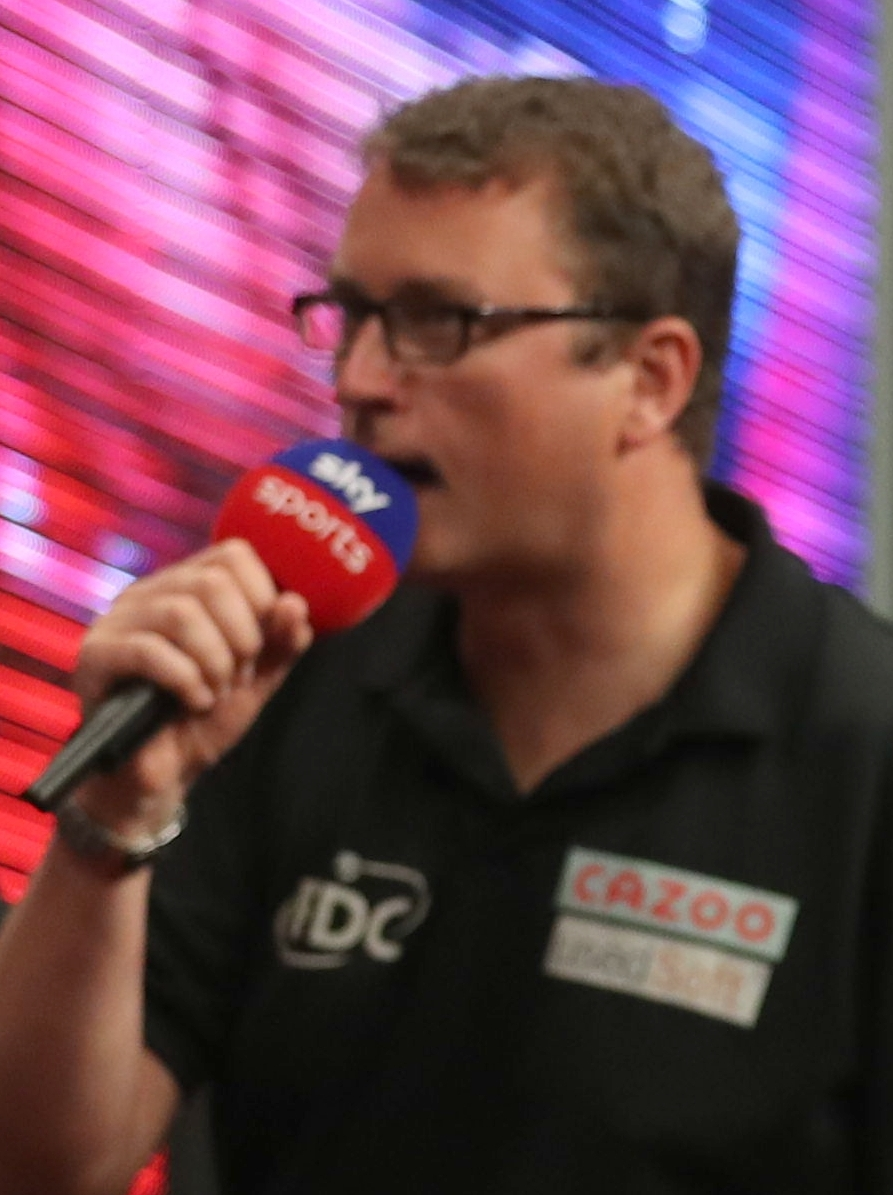
- Bevins in 2022
- Born: 7 June 1986 (age 39); Rugby, Warwickshire, England
- Occupation: Darts referee
- Years active: 2012–present
- Known for: Refereeing Professional Darts Corporation events Countdown contestant

Kirk Bevins (born 7 June 1986) is an English darts referee and a former contestant on the British game show Countdown. Nicknamed "the Kirkulator", Bevins won Series 60 of Countdown in 2009. He has worked as a full-time referee for the Professional Darts Corporation (PDC) since 2013.

== Early and personal life ==
Kirk Bevins was born on 7 June 1986 in Rugby, Warwickshire, England. He studied mathematics at the University of York, where he also played university darts. Upon graduating, he worked as a maths teacher and an actuary. Bevins is an avid trainspotter.

== Countdown ==
Bevins first appeared on the British game show Countdown in 2004 at age 17. In his return to the show in 2009, he became an "octochamp" by winning eight consecutive games and went on to become the Series 60 champion. His success on the show saw him earn the nickname "the Kirkulator".

== Darts ==
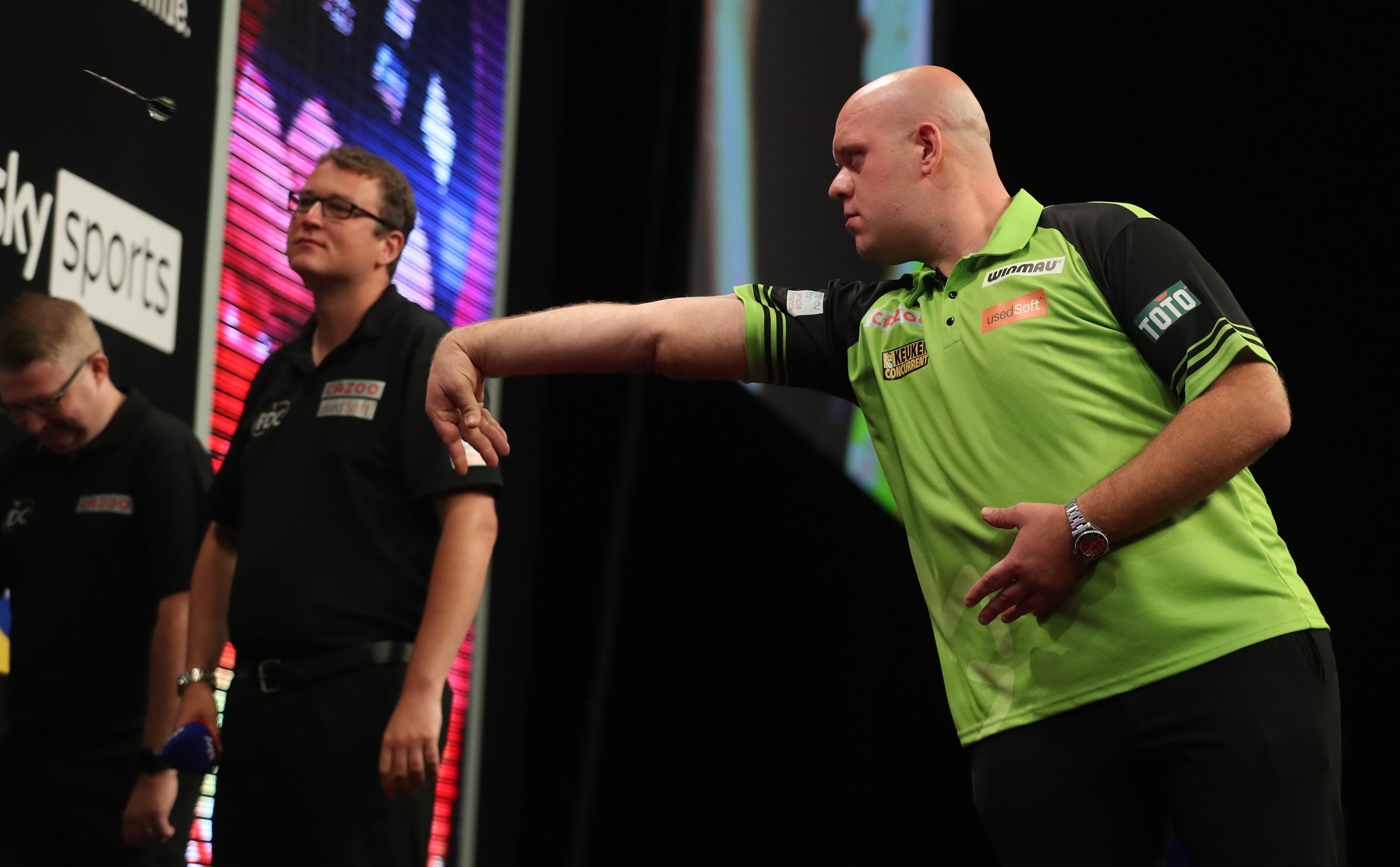
Bevins on stage with Michael van Gerwen during the 2022 Premier League Darts play-offs

Bevins became involved with the Professional Darts Corporation (PDC) when he, along with 31 other members of an Internet forum, began volunteering to score matches on the PDC Pro Tour. He had a trial run as a referee on television at the 2012 World Matchplay, where he officiated a first-round match between Kim Huybrechts and Terry Jenkins. In 2013, Bevins succeeded Bruce Spendley as a full-time referee for the PDC, following Spendley's retirement from televised events.

Bevins officiated a part of the 2018 PDC World Darts Championship final between Rob Cross and 16-time world champion Phil Taylor, which was Taylor's last match in professional darts. He was also the referee for a 2016 Premier League Darts match between Michael van Gerwen and Michael Smith, in which Van Gerwen broke the record for the highest three-dart average in a televised match. As of 2026, he has been a referee for 13 PDC World Darts Championships.

Bevins has been involved in Bullseye Maths, a PDC initiative launched in 2022 to promote mathematics to children. In December 2024, he was joined by Countdown star Rachel Riley for a session of Bullseye Maths with primary school children at Alexandra Palace, the venue for the PDC World Darts Championship.
