= British Dietetic Association =

Professional association and trade union

BDA
- British Dietetic Association
- Founded: 1936; 90 years ago
- Headquarters: Birmingham, England
- Location: United Kingdom
- Members: ▲12,168 (2025)
- Chair: Susan Price
- Chief Executive: Liz Stockley
- Affiliations: TUC; STUC
- Website: bda.uk.com

The British Dietetic Association (BDA) is a trade union for dietitians in the United Kingdom. It was founded in 1936 and became a certified union in 1982. It is affiliated to the Trades Union Congress and the Scottish Trades Union Congress.

== History of Dietetics and the BDA ==
Modern dietetics first began in the middle of the nineteenth century when Florence Nightingale observed the importance of diet and nutrition in warfare, during her time as a nurse in the Crimean War.

Following the appearance of the first dietitians in the United States at the start of the twentieth century, the first UK dietitians came from nursing sisters, then working in hospitals. The Edinburgh Royal Infirmary was the first hospital known to develop a dietetic department in 1924. The Infirmary launched the first dietetic diploma course around ten years after the creation of its dietetic department.

During this time, the BDA was formed - with their first meeting held on 24 January 1936 at St Thomas’ Hospital in London. The first chairperson was Margery Abrahams.

== Organization and membership ==
The BDA is a UK-wide membership organization representing over 11,000 dietitians and dietetic support workers. Members of the association may use the post-nominal MBDA. The association also awards fellowship status to member dietitians who have significantly contributed to the development of the field. Fellows use the post-nominal FBDA.

The BDA head office is in Birmingham. It has members from all four UK nations and some from overseas.

The majority of the BDA's membership work in the National Health Service. Approximately one third of the membership work in other sectors, such as education, private industry, private practice and the media.

In the UK, 'Dietitian' is a legally protected title. Unlike nutritionists and other food/nutrition titles, all dietitians are required to be educated to a certain level (a recognized UK degree level at least) and dietitians are the only food/nutrition professionals in the UK who must be regulated.

The BDA holds Patient Information Forum (PIF) TICK Certification. This certification indicates that information is produced in accordance with specific quality standards to support public trust. Certified organizations are permitted to use the quality mark on their materials to signify that the information comes from a verified source.

== Campaigns ==
The British Dietetic Association also administers the specialist register for dietitians and sports nutritionists (SENr) working with elite sportspeople.

In 2011, the BDA Chairman at the time, Helen Davidson, announced the creation of a brand new BDA national campaign. The aim of the campaign was to highlight levels of malnutrition in older people living in their own homes in the UK. Mind the Hunger Gap was deemed a great success with wide coverage and publicity across the UK, including advising the UL soap Emmerdale on a community malnutrition storyline in early 2013.

The BDA launched the campaign 'Work Ready' in 2016, which aims to highlight work-based health.

The BDA has served as an advocate for consumers. In 2022, the BDA joined with other organizations calling for a halt to the sale of mislabelled baby food.

== Publications ==
The British Dietetic Association produces a monthly magazine called Dietetics Today. Its official journal is the Journal of Human Nutrition and Dietetics, which is published bimonthly by John Wiley & Sons.

== See also ==
- List of diets
