= Icknield High School =

Location
- Riddy Lane; Luton, Bedfordshire, LU3 2AH; England
- 51°54′28″N 0°25′40″W

Information
- Type: Academy
- Department for Education URN: 137679 Tables
- Ofsted: Reports
- Headteacher: Kamran Ahmed
- Staff: 125
- Gender: Coeducational
- Age: 11 to 16
- Enrolment: 1458
- Website: http://www.icknield.beds.sch.uk/

Icknield High School is a state funded, non-denominational secondary academy school catering for pupils aged between 11 and 16 in Luton, Bedfordshire.

The school ranks 2nd of 21 secondary schools for Progress 8 in the Luton Local Authority. The headteacher is Kamran Ahmad. Ofsted found the school 'good'

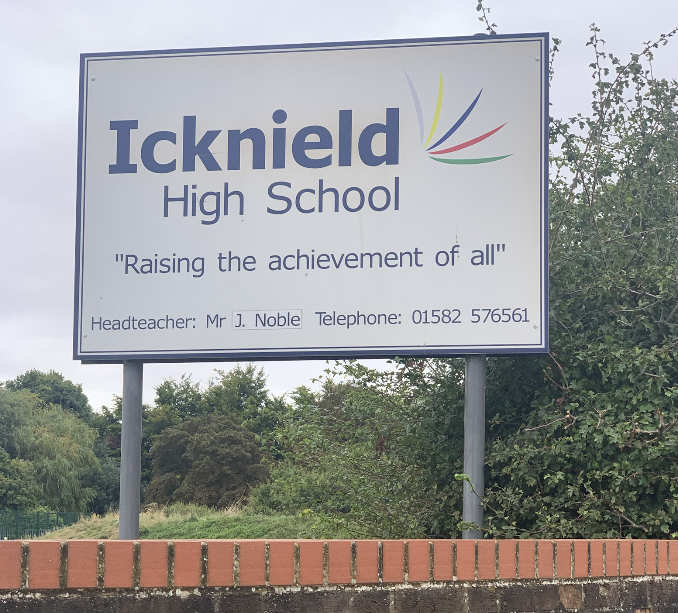
The school sign

== School days ==
During 1998, Icknield High School was the subject of an ITV documentary titled School Days. The six-part series took in day-to-day activities around the school, in addition to focusing on a handful of pupils threatened with expulsion from the school.

== Academy status ==
It was announced in late March 2011 that the governing body at the school have taken the contentious decision to fully investigate and explore the possibility of Icknield High School converting to an academy, after much objection from parents and external bodies who felt that the school would operate better under its then current structure. The school formally gained academy status on 1 December 2011.

== Notable former pupils ==
- Leon Barnett - a footballer who attended the school from 1997 to 2002, and was a prefect
- Steve Dillon - comic book artist
- Gavin Shuker - Member of Parliament for Luton South, elected in May 2010.
- Jason Wood - comedian
- Jamal Lewis - a footballer who currently plays for Preston North End.
- Simon Langley-Evans - a notable academic.
- Graham Earl - a former professional boxer who challenged for the WBO interim championship lightweight title
