= Luton Sixth Form College =

Location
- Bradgers Hill Road; Luton, Bedfordshire, LU2 7EW; England; 51.9023°N 0.4142°W

Information
- Type: Sixth form college
- Established: 1966; 60 years ago
- Department for Education URN: 130600 Tables
- Ofsted: Reports
- Principal: Altaf Hussain
- Gender: Both male and female
- Age: 16 to 19
- Former name: Luton Grammar School
- Website: www.lutonsfc.ac.uk

Luton Sixth Form College is a sixth form college in the Barnfield area of Luton, Bedfordshire, England.

== History ==
In 1904 Luton Council acquired the Modern School, which was a mixed-sex secondary school. This school moved into new buildings in Park Square in 1908 (now the site of the University of Bedfordshire). By 1919 the school had grown significantly and further expansion was needed. A new building was constructed at Alexandra Avenue for the girls (now the site of Denbigh High School). This school was named Luton High School for Girls; the boys continued at the old site in Park Square.

=== Grammar school ===
Again expansion meant that a new building was needed and, in 1938, the current college was built on the north side of Bradgers Hill Road as the new site for Luton Modern School. At that time, the school was on the northern edge of the developed area of Luton, with open countryside beyond. In 1944 the school became Luton Grammar School. A mixed-sex technical college remained at Park Square until it moved to Barnfield Avenue in the 1950s, as Luton Technical Grammar School, but it was often referred to as Luton Secondary Technical School or the Tech. The site is now home to Barnfield College.

On 16 February 1965, a radio programme recorded at the school, Sporting Chance, was broadcast on the BBC Light Programme, where a team from the school faced Maurice Edelston, Peter West and Alan Clarke, with the quiz hosted by John Snagge.

=== Sixth Form College ===
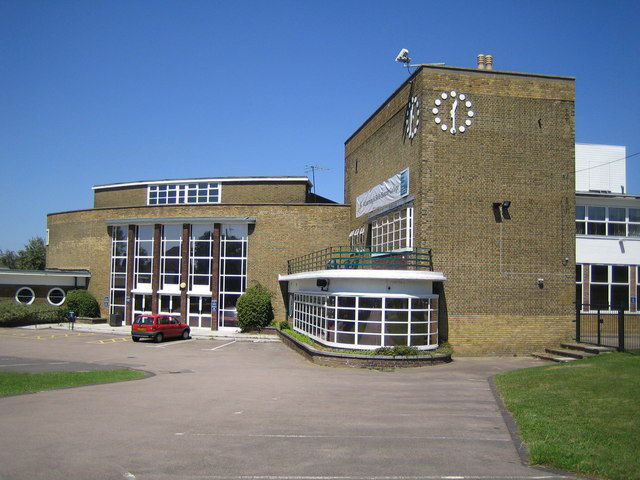
Luton Sixth Form College in 2006, before its rebuild in 2007-2010

In 1966 Luton Grammar School became the first Sixth Form College in the UK, drawing together the Sixth Forms from the three selective schools in Luton. Many of the staff from the previous sixth forms as well as the libraries moved to the Bradgers Hill Site.

The founding College Principal was Brian David Dance B.A. Oxon (formerly Headmaster Cirencester Grammar School) who oversaw the creation, amalgamation and development of the College from 1966 to 1973. In 2011 the Luton News wrote of Dance's contribution to the College, 'During his tenure at the college, it become a model of excellence for many other local education authorities, seeking as it did to offer the widest possible range of A level courses, in many combinations unavailable elsewhere'.

In 1971 the College participated in the BBC television version of Top of the Form inter-schools quiz show. After three victories (against Oxted County, Merthyr and Weston-super-Mare Grammar Schools) the College reached the finals of the national competition against Kenilworth Grammar School (broadcast on 8 June 1971). In August and September 1971 the same College team (together with Oban and Kenilworth Schools) took part in the BBC TV/USA TV 'Trans World Top Team' competition against the United States (represented by teams from Baltimore, New Orleans and St. Pauls). Of the six teams participating the College was placed close second to winners Baltimore.

In December 1981 the College set up an educational link with the Indian sub-continent when, in co-operation with the Central Bureau for Educational Exchanges and Visits, it participated in a 5 week visit to the Air Force Central School, New Delhi. During the exchange the College students had meetings with the Indian President, Sanjiva Reddy, at the Rashtrapati Bhavan (the former Viceroy's Palace) and Indira Gandhi, the Prime Minister, at her residence at 1, Akbar Road. In June 1982 the Indian students were guests of the College for five weeks and visited the Foreign Secretary in Whitehall.

On 21 April 2001 Dave Edwards, a former Physics teacher at the College, became the first man to win the million pounds in the UK version of Who Wants to Be a Millionaire? and only the second person after Judith Keppel. He competed in both series of Are You an Egghead?, reaching the last 16 in 2008, and the final in 2009, where he lost to fellow Millionaire winner Pat Gibson.

=== Rebuild ===
In early 2007, the college announced plans to rebuild the site. The new £56 million college opened to students on 7 September 2010 on the site of the old college's playing fields. Phase 2 of the rebuilding involved the demolition of the old buildings and the construction of a new car park, a cricket pitch, football pitches and a path from the entrance to the site to the new college in their place.

The rebuilding project took place under the Principalship of Simon Kitchener, who was the fourth College Principal following Brian Dance (1966–73), Laurence Martindale (1974-1988) and Brian Howseman (1988-2000). Simon Kitchener (2000-2012) was succeeded by Chris Nicholls (2012-2018), who retired in September 2018, to be followed by the present, fifth, incumbent, Altaf Hussain.

== Academic performance ==
=== Office for Standards in Education Report ===
The Office for Standards in Education deemed the following to be the strengths and weaknesses of Luton Sixth Form College (quoting directly):

- Key strengths
  - outstanding leadership and management
  - highly effective promotion of a multicultural ethos
  - overall, students achieving GCE grades higher than those predicted by their GCSE results, achieved by predicting lower grades at the beginning of the year.
  - fair standard of teaching and learning
  - very good specialist resources
  - thorough monitoring of student progress
  - excellent advice and guidance
  - excellent attendance and punctuality
  - relatively safe and secure environment.
- What should be improved
  - key skills provision
  - effectiveness of group tutorials
  - sharing of teaching skills and best practice between subject teams
  - pass rates and the proportion of high grades achieved in some GCE AS and A-level subjects are significantly below the national average.

It currently offers more than 60 AS/A Level and BTEC courses. Exam results improved in 2012; the A Level pass rate was 97.5%, with 42% of grades at A*-B. The BTEC Level 3 Diploma pass rate was 97.4%, with 72% of passes at high grades.

== Notable former pupils ==
- David Arnold, composer, musical curator of the London 2012 Olympics
- Shahidha Bari, academic and broadcaster
- Geoff Barton FRSE, scientist and university professor
- Kingsley Black, a professional footballer capped 30 times by Northern Ireland
- Rachel Hopkins, Labour MP for Luton South
- Nadiya Hussain, winner of The Great British Bake Off
- Angus Knowles-Cutler, businessman
- Simon Langley-Evans, British academic
- Sarfraz Manzoor, journalist, broadcaster, and screenwriter of "Blinded by the Light"
- Kerry McCarthy, Labour MP since 2005 for Bristol East
- Elizabeth Price, British artist who won the Turner Prize in 2012
- Colin Salmon, English actor
- Gavin Shuker, former Labour MP for Luton South
- Andrew Tate, media personality and former professional kickboxer
- Conor Travers, the youngest Countdown champion winning at the age of 14 years
- Steven West, Vice-Chancellor of the University of the West of England since 2008

=== Luton Grammar School ===
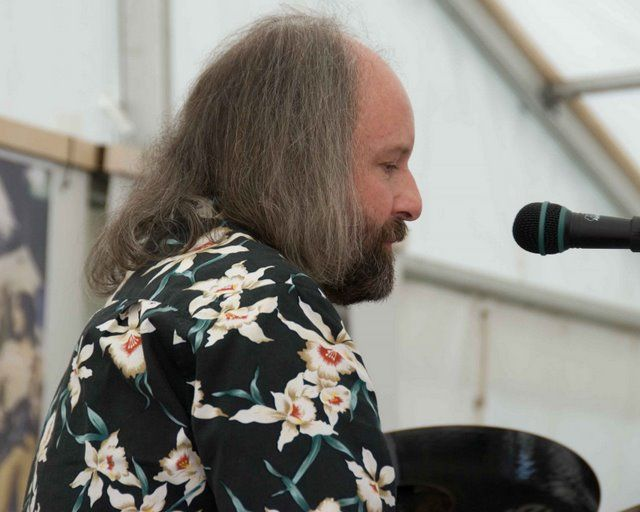
John Gosling, 1970s keyboardist of The Kinks

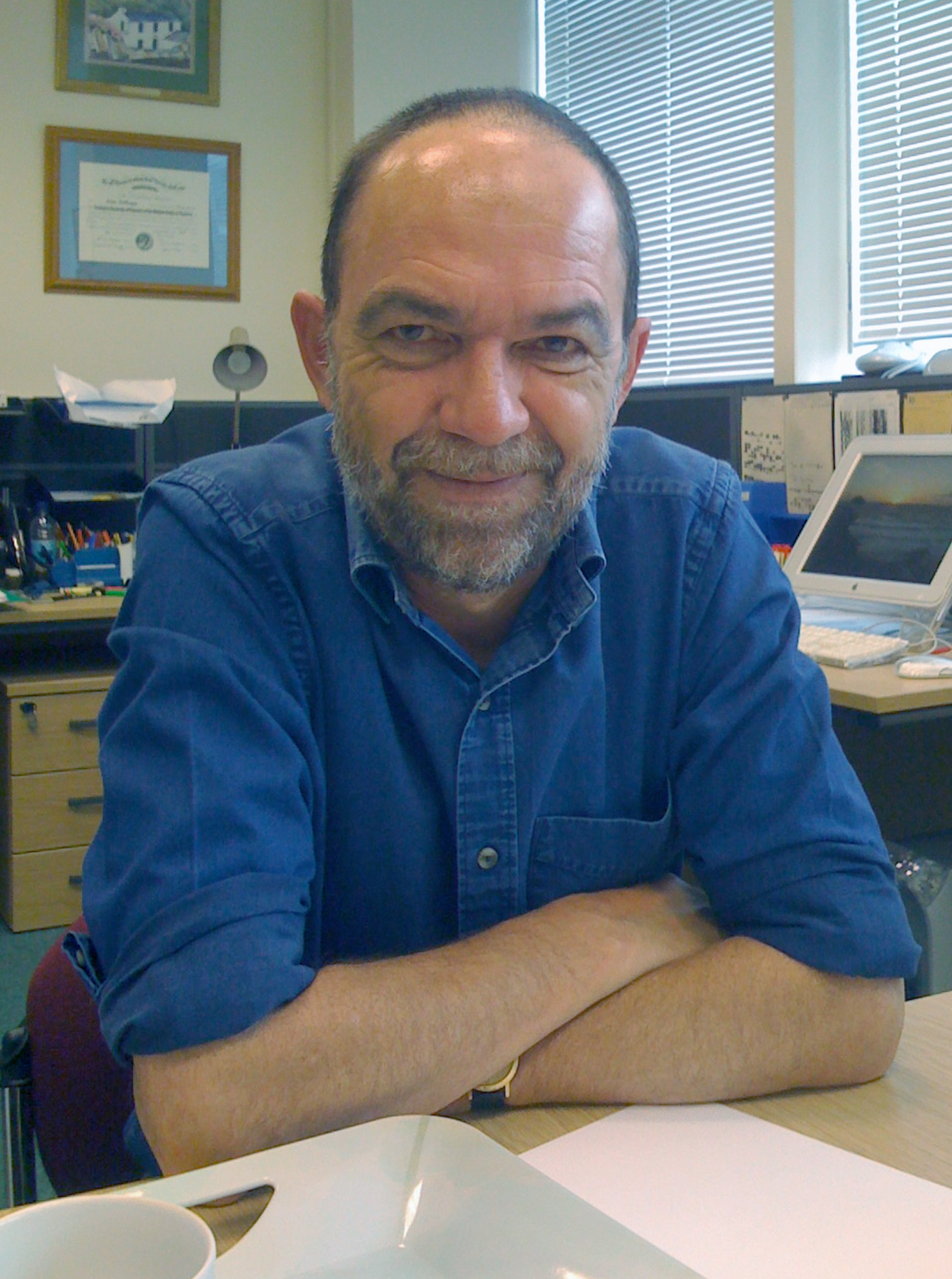
Sir Alec Jeffreys, Wolfson Research Professor of the Royal Society since 1991 at the University of Leicester

- Anthony Cave Brown, writer
- Laurie Brown, Bishop of Birmingham from 1969 to 1977
- Ivor Clemitson, Labour MP from 1974 to 1979 for Luton East
- Graham Collier OBE, jazz bandleader
- Philip Eden, weather forecaster (last three years at the comprehensive)
- Dennis Farr CBE, Director from 1980 to 1993 of the Courtauld Institute Galleries
- Prof Francis Goodyear, Hildred Carlile Professor of Latin from 1966 to 1983 at Bedford College, London
- John Gosling, keyboardist from 1969 to 1979 in The Kinks
- Alfred Hayes (wrestler)
- John Hegley, performance poet (briefly)
- Sir Colin Humphreys CBE, FRS FREng FIMMM FInstP, Goldsmiths' Professor of Materials Science from 1992 to 2008 at the University of Cambridge, and Director since 1994 of the Rolls-Royce University Technology Centre
- Sir Alec Jeffreys FRS, discoverer of DNA fingerprinting (last two years at the comprehensive)
- Michael Peters, designer
- David Renwick, TV writer of One Foot in the Grave and Jonathan Creek (last four years at the comprehensive)
- Neil Shand, TV comedy writer
- Steven M. Smith, Professor of Plant Genetics and Biochemistry and 'High-End Foreign Expert’ of the People's Republic of China (last two years at the comprehensive)
- David Stephen, Director from 1983 to 1984 of the UK Immigrants Advisory Service (the Immigration Advisory Service from 1993 to 2011), and from 2002 to 2004 of European Movement UK
- Ian Thompson, 1974 Christchurch Commonwealth Games Champion (still holds the record time) and 1974 European Marathon Champion
- Des Turner, Labour MP from 1997 to 2010 for Brighton Kemptown
- Peter Rolfe Vaughan, Professor of Ground Engineering from 1987 to 1994 at Imperial College London
- David Webb, actor and anti-censorship campaigner
- Denis Wick, trombonist
- Dudley Wood CBE, Secretary of the RFU from 1986 to 1995, and President of Bedfordshire CCC from 1998 to 2006

=== Luton Modern School ===
- Sir Frederick Mander, general secretary from 1931 to 1947 of the National Union of Teachers (NUT)
- Bernard Verdcourt, biologist
