= Conor Travers =

British Countdown champion

- Education: Cardinal Newman Catholic School, Luton, England. Luton Sixth Form College
- Alma mater: St John's College, Cambridge
- Known for: Television game show contestant; Youngest-ever Countdown series champion
- Awards: Countdown winner (2006); Countdown 30th Birthday Championship winner (2013)

Conor Travers is a British former contestant from the Channel 4 television game show Countdown. In May 2006 he became a series champion at the age of 14 years, and remains the show's youngest ever champion. He later qualified for the 12th Championship of Champions tournament, making the semi-final in the process. He also won the Countdown 30th Birthday Championship in March 2013, where in the final he scored a then-record equalling 146 points.

Travers studied for his GCSEs at Cardinal Newman Catholic School, Luton and he did his A-levels at Luton Sixth Form College. He went on to study mathematics at St John's College, University of Cambridge. His hobbies include cricket, chess, and computers.
