= Julian Fell =

British countdown contestant

Julian Fell is a winning contestant from the British game show Countdown. He was the 48th champion of the show. He scored 924 points in the heats, beating the previous record held by Chris Wills, and was the first player to score 100 points or more in all eight heat games.

During his eighth game, he broke numerous all-time Countdown records. He scored 138 points with three nine-letter words, both of which had never been done before. He then broke both of these records just two shows later with four nine-letter words and 146 points, a record which remained until 2019. He gained attention for this in the UK press.

He returned for the 11th "Champion of Champions" tournament, before being defeated by Graham Nash in the quarter-finals of that contest.

== See also ==
- Countdown
