= Countdown (game show) =

British game show

- Genre: Game show
- Created by: Armand Jammot; Marcel Stellman
- Based on: Des chiffres et des lettres by Armand Jammot
- Presented by: Richard Whiteley; Des Lynam; Des O'Connor; Jeff Stelling; Nick Hewer; Anne Robinson; Colin Murray
- Starring: Carol Vorderman; Susie Dent; Rachel Riley
- Theme music composer: Alan Hawkshaw
- Country of origin: United Kingdom
- Original language: English
- No. of series: 94 (Regular); 2 (Masters); 2 (Celebrity)
- No. of episodes: 8,798 (Regular); 104 (Masters); 14 (Celebrity); 45 (Specials)

Production
- Production locations: The Leeds Studios, Leeds (1982–2009); Granada Studios, Manchester (2009–2012); Dock10 studios (2013–present)
- Camera setup: Multi-camera
- Running time: 25 mins (excluding adverts, 1982–2001); 50 mins (including adverts, 2001–present)
- Production companies: Yorkshire Television (1982–2004); Granada Productions (2004–2009) (Note: Credited as a Granada Yorkshire Production from 2004 to 2006); ITV Studios (2009–2021); Lifted Entertainment (2021–present)

Original release
- Network: Channel 4; S4C (1982–2010; Wales)
- Release: 2 November 1982 – present

Related
- 8 Out of 10 Cats Does Countdown; Celebrity Countdown

Countdown is a British game show involving word and mathematical tasks that began airing in November 1982. It is broadcast on Channel 4 originally presented by Richard Whiteley and is currently presented by Colin Murray, assisted by Rachel Riley with lexicographer Susie Dent. It was the first programme to be broadcast on Channel 4, and 93 series have been broadcast since its debut on 2 November 1982. With more than 8,000 episodes, Countdown is one of Britain's longest-running game shows; the original French version, Des chiffres et des lettres (Numbers & Letters), ran on French television almost continuously from 1965 until 2024.

The two contestants in each episode compete in three game types: ten letters rounds, in which they attempt to make the longest word possible from nine randomly chosen letters; four numbers rounds, in which they must use arithmetic to reach a random target figure from six other numbers; and the conundrum, a buzzer round in which the contestants compete to solve a nine-letter anagram. During the series heats, the winning contestant returns the next day until they either lose or retire with eight wins as an undefeated "Octochamp". The best eight contestants are invited back for the series finals, which are decided in knockout format. Contestants of exceptional skill have received national media coverage and the programme, as a whole, is widely recognised and parodied within British culture.

Countdown was produced by Yorkshire Television and was recorded at The Leeds Studios for 27 years, before moving to the Manchester-based Granada Studios in 2009. Following the development of MediaCityUK, Countdown moved again in 2013 to the new purpose-built studios at Dock10 in Greater Manchester.

== Presenters ==
The programme was presented by Richard Whiteley for 23 years until his death on 26 June 2005. It was then presented by Des Lynam from October 2005 until December 2006, Des O'Connor from January 2007 until December 2008, Jeff Stelling from January 2009 until December 2011 and Nick Hewer from January 2012 until his retirement in June 2021, with Colin Murray standing in for Nick Hewer during part of the COVID-19 pandemic. The programme was then presented by Anne Robinson from June 2021 until July 2022. Murray then returned on 14 July as a stand-in host. On 25 July 2022, it was announced that Les Dennis would guest host the show from 4 to 15 August followed by Jenny Eclair from 16 to 19 August after Murray tested positive for COVID-19.

Guest hosts returned later that year as part of the show's 40th anniversary celebrations, with Floella Benjamin, Richard Coles, Trevor McDonald (for a second time) and Moira Stuart each hosting one week's episodes. Murray was announced as the programme's new permanent host in January 2023.

In the early years, the show had multiple assistant presenters, including Carol Vorderman who was hired for Series 1 and originally appeared as "vital statistician", a role in which she alternated with Dr Linda Barrett until Barrett's departure after Series 2. Letters were placed on the board initially by Cathy Hytner, who was then followed by Karen Loughlin in Series 14 (1987) and Lucy Summers for Series 17 in early 1989. Numbers were originally put up on the board by Beverley Isherwood until she was taken over by Hytner in November 1983 during Series 3. From the start of Series 18 in July 1989, after Summers left the show, Vorderman began putting up the letters and numbers on a permanent basis. After 26 years, she left the show in December 2008 (at the same time as O'Connor) and was replaced by Rachel Riley who has appeared in the role since January 2009. Dr Anne-Marie Imafidon stood in for Riley from December 2021 to March 2022 whilst Riley was on maternity leave. Dr Tom Crawford, an Oxford and Cambridge university lecturer, stood in for Riley for three weeks in early 2025, making his first appearance on 24 February as the show's first-ever male arithmetician.

Susie Dent first appeared on the show in June 1992 as one of the regularly rotated lexicographers; however, it was not until 2003 that she became a recurring member of the now reduced on-screen team. Series 53 from 2005 was the first where she is the sole lexicographer on the show and has been credited as a co-presenter since January 2015; although between November 2007 and February 2008, Dent was on maternity leave which saw Alison Heard return to fill in for her. In each episode she appears in "Dictionary Corner" alongside a celebrity guest who changes from week to week and, since September 2007, presents a brief segment called "Origins of Words". The other more notable past lexicographers, that have appeared in more than 100 episodes, include Catherine Clarke, Damian Eadie, Alison Heard, Mark Nyman, Richard Samson, Julia Swannell, Della Thompson, Freda Thornton and Yvonne Warburton.

Main presenters of Countdown
No	Main presenter	From	To	Duration
1	Richard Whiteley	2 November 1982	1 July 2005	22 years, 241 days
2	Des Lynam (Note: Lynam returned for the 5,000th episode, broadcast on 26 March 2010, as the Dictionary Corner guest.)	31 October 2005	22 December 2006	1 year, 52 days
3	Des O'Connor	2 January 2007	12 December 2008	1 year, 345 days
4	Jeff Stelling (Note: Returned as a "Dictionary Corner" guest for one week in August 2023.)	12 January 2009	16 December 2011	2 years, 338 days
5	Nick Hewer	9 January 2012	25 June 2021	9 years, 167 days
6	Anne Robinson	28 June 2021	13 July 2022	1 year, 15 days
7	Colin Murray (Note: Murray served as a guest presenter for Hewer as he was shielding during the second COVID-19 lockdown and after he was vaccinated. He returned as a temporary host on 14 July 2022 following Anne Robinson's departure, then later became a permanent host in January 2023.)	14 July 2022	present	4 years, 128 days

Co-presenters of Countdown
No	Co-presenter	From	To	Duration
1	Carol Vorderman (Note: After Des Lynam took over as presenter, she gave the celebrity introductions at the start of each show and was credited equally with Lynam and Des O'Connor, rather than as co-presenter.)	2 November 1982	12 December 2008	26 years, 40 days
2	Susie Dent (Note: Dent appeared as arithmetician in the 1997 Christmas special. For several episodes in late 2007 and early 2008, Alison Heard replaced Dent because of her pregnancy. Also, she was absent for episodes in 2021 and 2022 because of COVID-19 isolation but was not replaced by a stand-in lexicographer.)	29 June 1992	present	34 years, 143 days
3	Rachel Riley	12 January 2009	present	17 years, 311 days

Guest main presenters of Countdown
No	Guest main presenter	From	To	Duration
1	William G. Stewart (Note: Stewart presented the 1997 special featuring The 2000th Edition and that year's Christmas Special, where regular presenters Whiteley and Vorderman were contestants.)	6 May 1997		2 episodes
1	William G. Stewart	25 December 1997		2 episodes
2	Colin Murray	21 December 2020	16 March 2021	88 days
3	Trevor McDonald (Note: McDonald and Sissay were presenter and lexicographer respectively of special episode as part of Channel 4's Black To Front Day.)	10 September 2021		6 episodes
3	Trevor McDonald	14 November 2022	18 November 2022	6 episodes
4	Les Dennis (Note: Dennis covered for Murray for eight episodes because Murray tested positive for COVID-19 in August 2022. He returned as stand-in host for one week in February 2026.)	4 August 2022	15 August 2022	13 episodes
4	Les Dennis	2 February 2026	6 February 2026	13 episodes
5	Jenny Eclair (Note: Eclair covered for Murray for just four episodes because Murray tested positive for COVID-19 in August 2022.)	16 August 2022	19 August 2022	4 episodes
6	Floella Benjamin	31 October 2022	4 November 2022	5 episodes
7	Richard Coles	7 November 2022	11 November 2022	5 episodes
8	Moira Stuart	21 November 2022	25 November 2022	5 episodes

Guest co-presenters of Countdown
No	Guest co-presenter	From	To	Duration
1	Dr. Anne-Marie Imafidon (Note: Imafidon co-presented a special episode as part of Channel 4's Black to Front Day. She also covered for Riley when she was on maternity leave in 2021 and 2022)	10 September 2021	18 March 2022	61 episodes
2	Lemn Sissay	10 September 2021		1 episode
3	Dr. Tom Crawford (Note: Crawford stood in for Riley for 15 episodes in early 2025, as Riley had taken a short break from filming to work on another project.)	24 February 2025	14 March 2025	15 episodes

=== Timeline ===
The timeline below includes all main, co and guest presenters alongside notable past lexicographers as stated above.

== Background and origin ==
Countdown originated from the format of the French game show Des chiffres et des lettres (Numbers and Letters), created by Armand Jammot. The game debuted in September 1965 and initially featured only letters rounds, under the name Le Mot Le Plus Long (The Longest Word), before numbers were introduced to the revised format for its return in January 1972. After watching the programme, Belgian record executive Marcel Stellman brought the format to Britain on the belief it could be popular overseas and proposed his concept for the British version to several networks.

The concept was purchased in 1981 by Yorkshire Television, which, after producing two non-televised pilot episodes, commissioned a full series of eight shows under the title Calendar Countdown, which were broadcast over eight weeks between April and June 1982. Aimed at being a spin-off of their regional news programme Calendar, the programme's host deemed the natural choice for the concept. The spin-off was aired only in the Yorkshire Television area, with Richard Whiteley earning the nickname of "Twice Nightly Whiteley" because of his daily appearances on both programmes. He was assisted by Cathy Hytner and Denise McFarland-Cruickshanks, who handled the letters and numbers rounds respectively. Both Whiteley and Hytner appeared in the pilot episodes; alongside Robina Sharp, who handled the selection of numbers tiles and operated a one-armed bandit type "fruit machine" to choose the three-digit target, and Angela Garbut as the vital statistician. There was no lexicographer present at this time; they were introduced when the programme went to national television, with Ted Moult appearing in the pilot episodes and throughout the regional series as the celebrity guest. Moult would return as the show’s very first Dictionary Corner guest when the programme debuted on Channel 4; however, he only did the first seven episodes and never returned.

By 1982, after an additional pilot episode was made with a refined format – an episode that was never broadcast – the show was bought by Channel 4, a new British television channel set to launch in November 1982, based on the refined concept. While Whiteley and Hytner from the original pilot were retained, the programme was renamed Countdown, and the format was expanded to include additional members in the hosting team, including letters and number experts. It was commissioned to be broadcast four times a week for seven weeks initially, but was such a success that it is still being recommissioned as of 2024.

An additional spin-off to the programme for young contestants was proposed at the time, dubbed Junior Countdown – the concept would be similar in format, but hosted by Gyles Brandreth and Ted Moult – but while a pilot was created, the proposal was abandoned after it was found to be highly flawed.

Countdown was the first programme broadcast by Channel 4 when it launched on 2 November 1982, with Whiteley opening the programme with the line:

As the countdown to a brand new channel ends, a brand new Countdown begins.

—Richard Whiteley introducing the first Channel 4 episode of Countdown.

== History ==
=== Whiteley tenure ===
Richard Whiteley, Countdown's original presenter from 1982 until his death in June 2005.

Alongside the original cast from Calendar Countdown, the new format of the gameshow led to production staff seeking out further hostesses through advertising in national newspapers for young women to become a member of the programme's cast, with notable conditions about their involvement; in particular, those recruited for calculations found it made clear that as an applicant, their appearance would be less important than their skill as a mathematician. Amongst those recruited, Beverley Isherwood was hired to work alongside Hytner in handling the selection of number and letter tiles respectively, while Linda Barrett and Carol Vorderman were recruited for checking over calculations by contestants in the numbers round. In addition, a lexicographer was also required to form part of the format's "Dictionary Corner" segment, to verify words given by contestants in the letters round (see Letters round rules) and to point out any longer or otherwise interesting words available; such a role was aided by the show's producers, with no assistance from any computer program and accompanied by a celebrity guest for a set period on the programme – contributing words and providing entertainment through anecdotes, puzzles, poems and stories. The role of lexicographer was traditionally occupied by a member of the Oxford University Press or sometimes by a member of the show's production team. Amongst these who have appeared on the programme in "Dictionary Corner" are Nigel Rees, Jo Brand, Martin Jarvis, Richard Digance, Geoffrey Durham, Ken Bruce, Magnus Magnusson, Pam Ayres, Paul Zenon, Jenny Eclair, Al Murray, John Sergeant and Gyles Brandreth.

Over time, the additional hostesses on the programme were dropped by production staff who retained Vorderman and assigned her primarily to handle the selection of letter and number tiles, as well as verifying contestant calculations. The programme frequently rotated between more than thirty different lexicographers all with varying tenures, including Richard Samson and Alison Heard, for each series, until 2003, when the role was permanently given to Susie Dent, after her debut on Countdown in 1992.

On 26 June 2005, Richard Whiteley died after a failed heart operation. At the time, he had been slowly recovering from pneumonia earlier that year, which had prevented him recording further episodes. His death impacted the show, causing the episode scheduled for that day to be postponed by Channel 4 as a mark of respect, with no episode airing at all. The remaining episodes he had completed were aired after his death, the first of which was preceded by a tearful tribute from Carol Vorderman. After the series' conclusion, Countdown was placed into hiatus from 1 July to determine how to proceed; while the hiatus occurred, no Countdown episode repeats were aired on Channel 4.

=== Post-Whiteley ===
In October 2005, Channel 4 announced that Des Lynam would take over as the main presenter, having previously participated in the celebrity edition (Celebrity Countdown) in April 1998. Lynam's tenure ran until December 2006, whereupon his demanding filming schedule forced him to resign from the programme. Channel 4 proposed reducing his travelling by moving filming from Leeds to a site closer to his residence in Worthing, West Sussex, but viewers reacted angrily to the idea and Lynam decided it would cause considerable disruption for many of the programme's camera crew.

In January 2007, Des O'Connor took over as the main presenter. During his tenure as host, Susie Dent went on maternity leave over the winter of 2007–2008 and Alison Heard temporarily replaced her on the programme until 6 February 2008. By July 2008, both Des O'Connor and Carol Vorderman had announced that they would be leaving by the end of that year after the end of Series 59. While O'Connor decided to leave in order to concentrate on other projects, Carol Vorderman left after her offer to take a 33% salary decrease was rejected and production staff asked her to take a 90% pay cut; her agent stated that staff had told her that the show had survived without Richard Whiteley and could "easily survive without you". Some media reports suggested that the new presenter would be either Rory Bremner, the early favourite or Alexander Armstrong, but both ruled themselves out of the job. At the same time there was speculation that several prominent women, including Anthea Turner, Ulrika Jonsson and Myleene Klass were strong candidates to take over Carol Vorderman's job, but Channel 4 revealed that the role was to be assigned to a previously unknown male or female arithmetician with "charm and charisma".

When Des Lynam became the new presenter after Richard Whiteley's death in 2005, the show regularly drew an average 1.7 million viewers every day; this was around half a million more than in the last few years of Richard Whiteley presenting. The Series 54 final on 26 May 2006 attracted 2.5 million viewers. 3–4 million viewers had watched the show daily in its previous 16:15 slot. The drop in viewing figures following the scheduling change coupled with the show's perceived educational benefits, even caused Labour MP Jonathan Shaw to table a motion in the UK Parliament requesting that the show be returned to its later time. Minor scheduling changes subsequently moved the programme progressively earlier in the afternoon. For Series 46–50, the runtime increased to 45 minutes starting at 16:15, before moving to slots between 14:40 and 15:30 across Series 57–74. Following two earlier trials in late 2014 and across much of 2015, Countdown permanently settled into its current 14:10, 50-minute broadcast slot in October 2016 (from Series 75 onward).

In November 2008, Jeff Stelling was confirmed as the new host, while Oxford maths graduate Rachel Riley was confirmed as Carol Vorderman's replacement. Jeff Stelling remained with the programme until the end of 2011, when his football commitments with Sky Sports forced him reluctantly to leave Countdown. Before his departure, The Apprentice star Nick Hewer was announced as his replacement and he took over as the main presenter when his first episode aired on 9 January 2012. In 2020, during the COVID-19 pandemic, it was announced that Colin Murray (a frequent Dictionary Corner guest) would fill in for Nick Hewer while he spent a period of time in isolation during the UK's second lockdown.

Des O'Connor died on 14 November 2020 after suffering a fall at home the previous week; the episode that aired two days later was dedicated to his memory.

On 7 December 2020, Nick Hewer announced that he would be stepping down as the host of Countdown at the end of Series 83 in Summer 2021. Nick Hewer said it had been "privilege and a pleasure to take the helm of Countdown". It was then announced on 15 February 2021 that Anne Robinson, who first appeared on the show as a guest in Dictionary Corner in 1987, would take over from Nick Hewer at the start of Series 84. Nick Hewer's final show aired on 25 June 2021. On 28 June 2021, Anne Robinson became the show's first female host in its 39-year history. In May 2022, it was announced that she would be leaving the show after just one year with Colin Murray taking over for the majority of Series 86. In total, Anne Robinson recorded 265 episodes, which equates to two full series and the first three weeks of Series 86.

=== Character ===
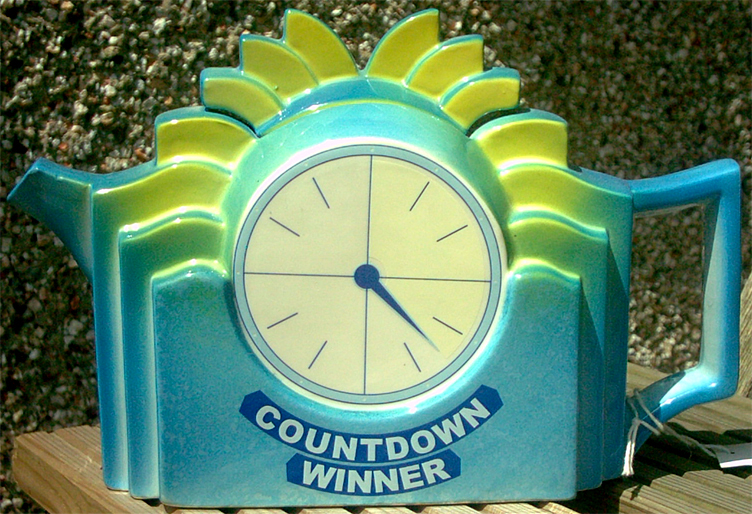
A Countdown teapot is awarded to any contestant who wins a game.

Countdown quickly established cult status within British television – an image which it maintains today, despite the loss of key presenters. The programme's audience comprises mainly students, homemakers and pensioners, because of the "teatime" broadcast slot and inclusive appeal of its format and presentation. Countdown has been one of Channel 4's most-watched programmes for more than twenty years, but has yet to win a major television award.

On each episode, the prize for defeating the reigning champion (or for claiming the championship when two new contestants compete) is a teapot that is styled to resemble the renowned clock used in each round. Introduced in December 1998, the teapot is custom-made by Swineside Ceramics and can only be obtained by winning a game on the programme. Defeated contestants and retiring undefeated champions receive an assortment of Countdown-themed merchandise as a parting gift.

At first, the prize for the series winner was a leather-bound copy of the twenty-volume Oxford English Dictionary, worth over £4,000. David Acton (winner of Series 31) opted for a CD-ROM version of the dictionaries, not wanting to accept leather-bound books owing to his strict veganism, and donated the monetary difference in the prices to charity. Between 2011 and 2021, the prize consisted of ordinary hardback twenty-one-volume dictionaries, a laptop computer and a lifetime subscription to Oxford Online (replaced by a MacBook Pro laptop by Series 68). The physical dictionaries were discontinued as a prize after Series 83, as they were deemed obsolete. As of Series 54 in 2006, the series champion also receives the Richard Whiteley Memorial Trophy in memory of the show's original presenter.

Runner-up prizes in the finals increased over the years from a £100 book voucher to £250, later to £500 and then £1,000. Beginning with Series 68, the runner-up in the finals wins a laptop.

=== Celebrations ===
The first episode of Countdown was repeated on 1 October 2007 on More4 and also on 2 November 2007 on Channel 4; this was as part of Channel 4 at 25, a season of programmes to celebrate its 25th birthday.

On 2 November 2007, Countdown celebrated its 25th anniversary and aired a special 'birthday episode'. The two players were 2006 winner Conor Travers and 2002 winner Chris Wills. However, for the rounds, VIP guests selected the letters and numbers. Guests included Gordon Brown, Amir Khan and Richard Attenborough. A statement from the French TV network France Télévisions was read out on air by Carol Vorderman to commend Channel 4 on its success of Countdown.

On 26 March 2010, Queen Elizabeth II congratulated Countdown for amassing 5,000 episodes. On 5 September 2014, the programme received a Guinness World Record at the end of its 6,000th show for the longest-running television programme of its kind during the course of Series 71.

== Format ==
Countdown has occupied a daytime broadcast slot since its inception, originally in a 30-minute format. Since 2001, an episode lasts around 45 minutes including advertising breaks. During the normal series, the winner of each game returns for the next day's show. A player who wins eight games is declared an "octochamp" and retires from the programme. At the end of the series, the eight best players (ranked first by number of wins, then by total score if required to break a tie) are invited back to compete in the series finals. They are seeded in a knockout tournament, with the first seed playing the eighth seed, the second playing the seventh and so on. The winner of this knockout, which culminates in the Grand Final, becomes the series champion. Each series lasts approximately six months with approximately 125 episodes.

Approximately every four series, a Champion of Champions tournament takes place. For this, sixteen of the best players to have appeared since the previous Championship are invited back for another knockout tournament. The producer, former contestant Damian Eadie, decides which players to include, but typically the tournament includes the series winners and other noteworthy contestants. Series 33 was designated a "Supreme Championship", in which 56 of the best contestants from all the previous series returned for another knockout tournament. Series 10 champion Harvey Freeman was declared Supreme Champion after beating Allan Saldanha in the final. There are also occasional special episodes, in which past contestants return for themed matches. For example, David Acton and Kenneth Michie returned for a rematch of their Series 31 final, while brothers and former contestants Sanjay and Sandeep Mazumder played off against each other on 20 December 2004.

Since the change to 45-minute episodes, the game has been split into three sections, separated by advertising breaks. The first section contains two letters rounds and one numbers round, the second has two letters rounds and one numbers round followed by the anecdote from the Dictionary Corner guest and then a further two letters rounds and one numbers round, while the last section has two letters rounds, Susie Dent's "Origins of Words" item since September 2007, two further letters rounds, one numbers round and a final "Conundrum" puzzle. With the exception of the Conundrum, the contestants swap control after every round so that each of them has control for five letters rounds and two numbers rounds.

At the end of the first two sections, the host poses a "Teatime Teaser" for the viewers since series 46 in 2001, giving a set of short words and a cryptic clue to a single word that can be anagrammed from them. The solution is revealed at the start of the next section. (Example: Given the words SAD MOODY and the clue "We'll all be sad and moody when this arrives", the solution would be DOOMSDAY.) The length of the Teatime Teaser anagram has varied between seven and nine letters since its introduction.

=== Letters round ===
The contestant in control chooses between two stacks of face-down letter tiles, one containing vowels (A-E-I-O-U only) and the other consonants, and the assistant reveals the top tile from that stack, announces the letter and places it on the board. This is done nine times and the final grouping must contain at least three vowels and four consonants. The contestants then have 30 seconds to form the longest single word they can, using the nine revealed letters; no letter may be used more often than it appears in the selection. The frequencies of the letters within each stack are weighted according to their frequency in natural English, in the same manner as in the game Scrabble. For example, there are many Ns and Rs in the consonant stack, but very few tiles for rarely used letters such as Q and J. The letter frequencies are altered by the producers from time to time, so any published list does not necessarily reflect the letters used in any particular programme. The two stacks of tiles are not replenished between rounds.

Both contestants write down the words they form, in case they select the same one. After time runs out, the host asks the contestants to declare their word lengths, starting with the contestant who chose the letters. The host then asks the discovered words, starting with the shorter declared length. If one contestant has not written their word down in time, they must state this fact; if both then declare the same length, that contestant must give their word first to prevent cheating. If both contestants state that they have not written their words, the host allows them a moment to do so; this is typically edited out of the final broadcast. The contestant with the longer valid word scores one point per letter, or 18 points if they have used all nine. If the words are identical or of the same length, both contestants score. In the former case, the contestants must show their written words to each other as proof that they are the same. If a contestant is visually impaired, Dictionary Corner will verify the word. Contestants who inaccurately declare the length of their word score zero, even if the word is valid. Each round ends with Dictionary Corner revealing the longest words and any unusual ones that can be formed from the available letters, aided by the production team.

Most words which appear in the Oxford Dictionary of English are valid, as well as accepted forms of them that may not be explicitly listed. Examples are:

- Common nouns and their plurals
- Verbs and their inflections (e.g. "escape", "escaped", "escaping")
- Comparative and superlative forms of adjectives (if the adjective is more than one syllable, the form must be explicitly listed)
- Plurals of foods specified as mass nouns that may be ordered in restaurants (e.g. "pastas", as in "We'll have two pastas")

Words that are not allowed include:

- Terms which are always capitalised, including proper nouns (e.g. "Jane" or "London")
- Words spelled with an apostrophe (e.g. "Didn't" or "Wouldn't")
- Hyphenated terms
- Words that are never used alone (e.g. "gefilte"; only used as part of "gefilte fish")
- Since 2002, American spellings of words are not allowed (e.g. "flavour" and "signalled" are allowed, but "flavor" and "signaled" are not). Words with the suffix -ize (e.g. "realize") and derived words such as "realizing" are permitted in addition to the corresponding -ise spellings (e.g. "realise"), as the Oxford Dictionary of English regards both as British English spellings per the Oxford spelling convention.

Example:

Contestant One chooses five consonants, then three vowels, then another consonant.
Selection is:

G Y H D N O E U R

Contestant One declares 7, while Contestant Two declares 8.
Contestant One declares younger, but Contestant Two declares hydrogen and scores 8 points. Contestant One does not score.
Dictionary Corner notes greyhound, which would have scored 18 points for using all nine letters.

=== Numbers round ===
The contestant in control chooses six of 24 shuffled face-down number tiles, arranged into two groups: 20 "small numbers" (two each of 1 to 10) and four "large numbers" of 25, 50, 75 and 100. The contestant decides how many large numbers are to be used, from none to all four, after which the six tiles are randomly drawn and placed on the board. A random three-digit target figure from 100 to 999 is then generated by an electronic machine, known as "CECIL" (which stands for Countdown's Electronic Calculator In Leeds). The contestants have 30 seconds to work out a sequence of calculations with the numbers whose final result is as close to the target number as possible. They may use only the four basic operations of addition, subtraction, multiplication and division, and do not have to use all six numbers. A number may not be used more times than it appears on the board. Only exact division, with no remainder, is permitted. Fractions and negative numbers are not allowed. As in the letters rounds, both contestants must declare their results, and any contestant who has not fully written their calculations down in time must go first if both declare the same result. The contestants must show their written work to each other if their results and calculations are identical.

The contestant who has declared a result closer to the target is called upon to state their calculations first. Only if they make a mistake or if both contestants are equally close to the target, is the opponent called upon.

Only the contestant whose result is closer to the target scores points: ten for reaching it exactly, seven for being between one and five from the target and five for being within six and ten from the target. Contestants score no points for being more than ten away, if their calculations are flawed or if they take too long to give a solution or after saying they have not written it down. Both score if they reach the same result or if their results are equally close. Should neither contestant reach the target exactly, the assistant is called upon to attempt a solution, either immediately or at a later time during the episode.

Example:

Contestant One requests two large numbers and four small numbers.
Selection is:

75 50 2 3 8 7

Randomly generated target is:

812

Contestant One declares 813, while Contestant Two declares 815.
Contestant One is closer and so reveals: 75 + 50 – 8 = 117, and 117 × 7 – (3 × 2) = 813, which scores 7 points for being 1 away. Contestant Two does not score.
Assistant notes: 50 + 8 = 58, and 7 × 2 × 58 = 812, which would have scored 10 points.

In some games, there are many ways to reach the target exactly; the example target above could also be reached by 7 × (75 + 50 + 2 – 8 – 3) = 812. Not all games are solvable exactly, and for a few selections it is impossible even to get within 10, most commonly when a contestant picks six small numbers and the target number is quite large. There is a tactical element in selecting how many large numbers to include. One large and five small numbers is the most popular selection, although having two large numbers gives the best chance of the game being solvable exactly. Selections with zero or four large numbers are generally considered the hardest.

The 24 tiles are laid out in four rows, the topmost of which contains only the four large numbers. The contestant may specify how many tiles to draw from each row, or simply state how many large and small numbers will be used; in the latter case, the assistant draws the tiles randomly. The numbers are usually placed on the board from right to left, starting with the small ones, but have occasionally been displayed in scrambled order. On rare occasions, the contestant has declined to make any choices, in which case the assistant selects the tiles. Unlike the letters round, the pool of tiles is fully replenished after each numbers round.

Example:

Contestant requests one from the top (large), two from the second row (small), and three more from the top (large).
Selection is (in disorder):

50 10 6 25 100 75

A special edition, broadcast on 15 March 2010, for two previous series champions, Kirk Bevins and Chris Davies, used instead of the usual four large numbers, the numbers 12, 37 and two numbers unrevealed for the duration of the show. In a further special broadcast on 16 August 2010 between the Series 59 finalists Charlie Reams and Junaid Mubeen, the other two numbers were revealed to be 62 and 87.

=== Conundrum ===
The final round of the game is the Countdown Conundrum, in which the contestants are shown a combination of two or three words with a total of nine letters. They have 30 seconds to form a single word using all the letters and must buzz in to respond (a bell for the champion and a buzzer for the challenger). Each contestant is allowed only one guess and the first to answer correctly scores 10 points. If a contestant buzzes in and either responds incorrectly or fails to give any response, they are frozen out and the remaining time is given to the opponent. If neither contestant can solve it, the presenter asks whether anyone in the audience knows the answer and if so, chooses someone to call it out (this practice was stopped temporarily in 2009 to avoid difficulties with camera angles after the studio layout was changed). The Conundrum is intended to have only one solution, but on occasion more than one valid word is found by happenstance (e.g. MISSATTEE can become both ESTIMATES and STEAMIEST). If this happens, any of these results are accepted. On rare occasions, the Conundrum is presented as a single nine-letter word that must be anagrammed into another one (e.g. SMARTENED becoming TRADESMEN).

If the contestants' scores are within ten points of each other going into this round, it is referred to as a "Crucial Countdown Conundrum." Since ten points are at stake, the contestant who solves it (if any) will either win the game or force a tiebreaker. If the scores are tied after the Conundrum, additional Conundrums are played until the tie is broken. There have been several instances in which two Conundrums were used to decide the winner, but only a handful of episodes have required three. There have also been cases when even more Conundrums have been required to provide a winner, but not all have been included in the transmitted programme.

Example:

Conundrum is revealed:

C H I N A L U N G

Contestant One buzzes-in and says launching. This answer is revealed to be correct and Contestant One scores 10 points.

== Evolution ==
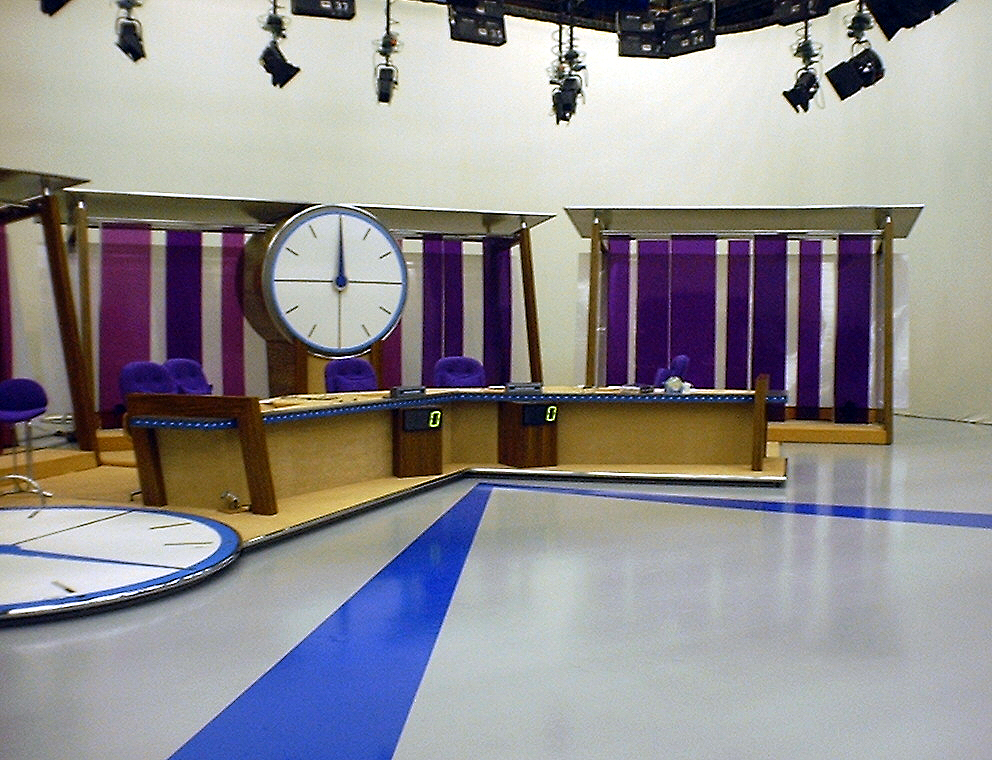
The studio used from 2003 until 2008 before the start of a game

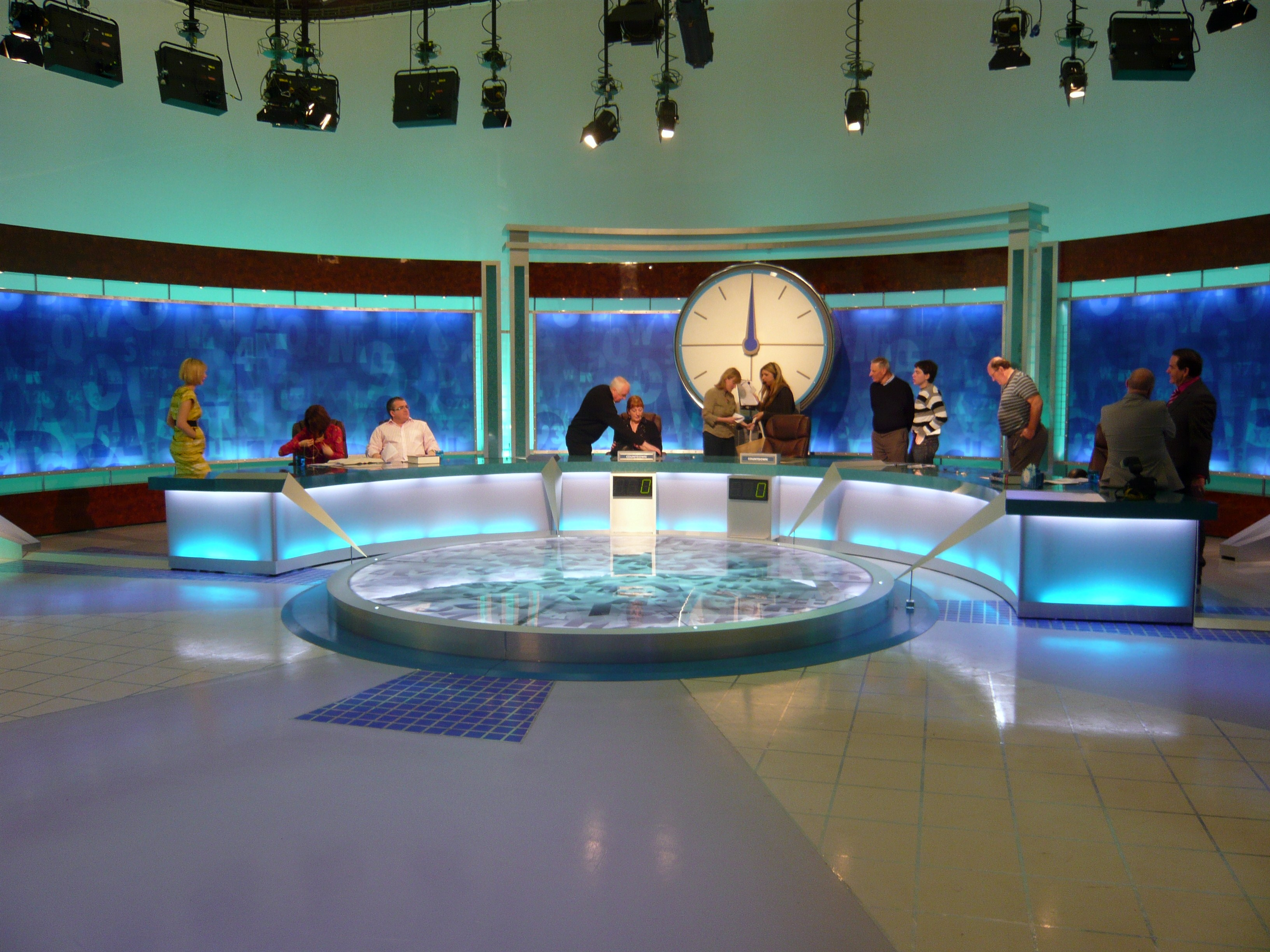
The studio used from 2009 until 2012, after the end of a game

Panorama of the 2017 set

The rules of Countdown are derived from those of Des chiffres et des lettres. Perhaps the biggest difference is the length of the round; DCedL's number rounds are each 45 seconds long to Countdown's 30. DCedL also features "duels", in which players compete in short tasks such as mental arithmetic problems, forming two themed words from a set of letters, or being asked to spell a word correctly. Other minor differences include a different numbers scoring system (9 points for an exact solution, or 6 points for the closest inexact solution in DCedL) and the proportion of letters to numbers rounds (10 to 4 in Countdown, 8 to 4 in DCedL).

The pilot episode followed significantly different rules from the current ones. Most noticeably, only eight letters were selected for each letters round. If two contestants offered a word of the same length, or an equally close solution to a numbers game, then only the contestant who made the selection for that round was awarded points. Also, only five points were given for an exact numbers solution, three for a solution within 5, and one point for the closer solution, no matter how far away.

Though the style and colour scheme of the set have changed many times, and the show itself moved to Manchester after more than 25 years in Leeds, the clock has always provided the centrepiece. Like the clock music (composed by Alan Hawkshaw), it is an enduring and well-recognised feature of Countdown. Executive producer John Meade once commissioned Alan Hawkshaw to revise the music for extra intensity, introducing the new version at the start of Series 31 in January 1996, but the old tune was reinstated after just 12 shows due to hundreds of complaints from viewers.

The original set, known as the Pastel set, was used from its launch in 1982 until Series 17 in early 1989. A new brown wooden set was introduced in Series 18 in July 1989 but remained in use for less than two years. Series 22 from July 1991 saw the introduction of the familiar and long-lived "Wings" set which was used in its original form, a red colour scheme, until 1995. Series 31 in January 1996 saw its colour scheme change to purple and changed again to tangerine at the end of 1999 alongside updated displays for the scores and CECIL. January 2003 saw the set updated to a new pink and purple striped theme with the letters and numbers boards now on separate islands rather than being integrated into the set. Six years later, in January 2009, the set received another redesign with a numerical blue theme and the letters and numbers boards mounted on opposite sides of a single display stand. New modern displays for the scores and the numbers round came in January 2013 while the set received a slight redesign in July 2017 while retaining the blue background which has been used to up to the most recent series. The original clock featured until September 2013, when it was replaced.

Until the end of Series 21, if the two contestants had equal scores after the first conundrum, the match was declared a draw and they both returned for the next show. A significant change in the format occurred in September 2001, when the show was expanded from nine rounds and 30 minutes to the current fifteen rounds and 45 minutes. The older format was split into two halves, each with three letters and one numbers game, plus the conundrum at the end of the second half. When the format was expanded to fifteen rounds, Richard Whiteley continued to refer jokingly to the three segments of the show as "halves". Under the old format, Grand Finals were specially extended shows of fourteen rounds, but now all shows use a fifteen-round format.

The rules regarding which words are permitted have changed with time. American spelling was allowed until 2002 and more unspecified inflections were assumed to be valid.

In September 2007, an "Origin of Words" feature was added to the show, in which Susie Dent explains the origin of a word or phrase she has been researching. This feature follows the eighth letters round, partway through the third section of each episode. The feature was omitted during the time that she was absent for maternity leave and was reinstated upon her return.

When the 15-round format was first introduced in September 2001, the composition of the rounds was different from that used by the programme today. The three sections each had five rounds; four letters rounds and one numbers round in each of the first two sections with three letters rounds, one numbers round and the conundrum in the third section. This meant that there was a slight imbalance, whereby one contestant made the letters sections for six rounds, but had the choice of the numbers selection just once, whereas the other contestant chose letters five times and numbers twice. The Dictionary Corner guest's spot was immediately before the first advertising break and Susie Dent's Origin of Words spot preceded the second numbers game shortly before the second break. The change to the present format was made on 25 March 2013, three weeks into the second section of Series 68, to comply with Channel 4's decision to increase the amount of advertising and to alter the times when they occur during the programme, therefore reducing Countdown's actual show length from 36 to 35 minutes.

Since 31 August 2026, contestants are known by their forenames only.

== Notable contestants ==
Since the debut of Countdown in 1982, there have been more than 8,700 televised episodes and 93 complete series. There have also been sixteen Champion of Champions tournaments, the most recent in January 2023.

Several of the programme's most successful contestants have received national media coverage. Teenager Julian Fell set a record score of 146 in December 2002. In 2006, 14-year-old Conor Travers became the youngest series champion in the show's history, and 11-year-old Kai Laddiman became the youngest octochamp for 20 years. Conor Travers went on to win the 30th Anniversary Champion of Champions series in March 2013 with a record-equalling top score of 146. On 17 January 2019, in the quarter-final of the 15th Champion of Champions tournament, Zarte Siempre, who eventually won that tournament set a new record score of 150. This record was beaten in May 2019 by Elliott Mellor's score of 152. A new record was set on 29 September 2022 when contestant Tom Stevenson scored 154. This record score of 154 was equalled by contestant Cillian McMulkin on 31 January 2023.

At eight years old, Tanmay Dixit was the youngest player ever to appear on the show, achieving two wins in March 2005. He also received press attention for his offerings in the letters round, which included fannies and farted.

On Christmas Day 1987, Nic Brown set the highest score difference ever achieved in a standard 14-round game, beating Joel Salkin 108–36, a margin of 72 points. Brown also went on to become one of the only two contestants ever to achieve an undefeated 'grand slam' – becoming an Octochamp, winning a series, and winning a Championship of Champions.

In April 2013, Giles Hutchings, a student at Royal Grammar School, Guildford broke the record for the highest octochamp score, amassing 965 points over 8 games. He went on to win Series 68. The record was beaten by Dylan Taylor, who achieved an octochamp score of 974 in August 2013, but he lost the Grand Final of that series. In 2019 the record was beaten by 87 points by teenager Elliott Mellor, who became the first octochamp to break the 1,000-point barrier scoring a total of 1,061 over his eight preliminary games. Echoing Dylan's appearance, Mellor was pipped to the series title, finishing as runner up. Three former contestants have returned to Countdown as part of the production team: Michael Wylie, Mark Nyman (as producer, and occasional lexicographer in Dictionary Corner) and Damian Eadie (the current series producer).

In 1998, sixteen celebrities were invited to play Celebrity Countdown, a series of eight games broadcast every Thursday evening over the course of eight weeks. The celebrities included Whiteley's successor Des Lynam, who beat Siân Lloyd. The highest and lowest scores were posted in the same game when TV's Hugh Fearnley-Whittingstall beat wine critic Jilly Goolden 47–9.

Richard Whiteley and Carol Vorderman competed in another special episode on Christmas Day 1997. For this game, the presenter's chair was taken by William G. Stewart, the host of fellow Channel 4 game show Fifteen to One. Susie Dent took over Carol Vorderman's duties, and Mark Nyman occupied Dictionary Corner, accompanied by Magnus Magnusson. The game was close-fought and decided only by the crucial Countdown conundrum mistletoe which Carol Vorderman solved in two seconds, after Richard Whiteley had inadvertently buzzed after one second because when he regularly hosted the show, he hit the button to reveal the conundrum and kept his old habit up.

Contestants who have or had become notable for other reasons include Nuts magazine editor-at-large Pete Cashmore, rugby player Ayoola Erinle, footballers Neil MacKenzie, Clarke Carlisle and Matt Le Tissier, musicians Jon Marsh and Nick Saloman, comedian Alex Horne, noted Irish playwright Peter Sheridan and professional darts referee Kirk Bevins, who won Series 60 and was a quarter-finalist in the 30th Birthday Championship.

== In popular culture ==
Countdown is often referenced and parodied in British culture.

=== Assorted allusions ===
In 1992, Saint Etienne used a sample of the host's lead-in for "today's Countdown Conundrum" as the opening for the track "Stoned to Say the Least".

In the 2002 film About a Boy, protagonist Will Freeman is a regular viewer of Countdown.

The Doctor Who episode "Bad Wolf" (2005) mentions a futuristic version of Countdown, in which the goal is to stop a bomb from exploding in 30 seconds. Countdown was referenced again in a later series in "Last of the Time Lords" (2007), where Professor Docherty expresses a keen fondness for the show and how it "hasn't been the same since Des took over—both Deses.”

Fairport Convention guitarist Simon Nicol titled one of his solo albums Consonant Please Carol, echoing one of the show's catchphrases.

Mentioned in episode one (2012) of series 4 of TV series Misfits.

=== Video game ===
A Countdown video game was released for the Nintendo DS and Nintendo Wii in 2009. There have also been mobile apps of the game released.

=== Outtakes ===
The letters of a round during a 1991 episode in which both contestants declared the word wankers.

Countdown has also generated a number of widely viewed outtakes, with the letters occasionally producing a word that was deemed unsuitable for the original broadcast. A round in which Dictionary Corner offered the word gobshite featured in TV's Finest Failures in 2001 (the actual episode aired on 10 January 2000), and in one episode from 7 January 1991, contestants Gino Corr and Lawrence Pearse both declared the word wankers. This was edited out of the programme but has since appeared on many outtakes shows. When contestant Charlie Reams declared wankers on 21 October 2008 edition, the declaration was kept in but the word itself was bleeped. Other incidents with only marginally rude words (including wanker, singular) have made it into the programme as they appeared, such as those with Tanmay Dixit referenced above, a clip from a 2001 episode in which the word fart appeared as the first four letters on the board (which also featured on 100 Greatest TV Moments from Hell), and a round where an anagram of the word fucked appeared on the board in the string "A U O D F C K E G", although neither player chose to use the word and Dictionary Corner was able to find two seven-letter words that could have been made from the board's offerings. On 2 February 2017, the board for the letters round was "M T H I A E D H S", and with both players offering sevens, Dictionary Corner found the word "shithead", which was bleeped out in the audio and censored on-screen with the poo emoji.

=== Humour ===
The programme is mentioned in an episode of Irish sitcom Father Ted entitled "The Old Grey Whistle Theft", Still Game (in the episode "Wireless") and is also referenced in the very first episode of Little Britain from 2003. BBC impression sketch show Dead Ringers parodies Countdown numerous times, and another television programme, The Big Breakfast, parodied Countdown in a feature called "Countdown Under". In a sketch "Countdown to Hell" from the comedy show A Bit of Fry and Laurie, Stephen Fry lampooned Richard Whiteley's punning style and Hugh Laurie played one of the contestants, while Gyles Brandreth (played by Steve Steen), presented with the letters "bollocsk", got the (non-)word "sloblock" (supposedly meaning exactly the same as "bollocks"). The show also has a fleeting reference in British sitcom The Office when Chris 'Finchy' Finch attempts to insult temporary worker Ricky when he explains he had a job to pay for his studies. Finchy states that it probably was 'professor in charge of watching Countdown every day', commenting on its student audience, and referring to the fact anyone watching Countdown during its 'hometime' time slot cannot be out at work.

The format of the show has been parodied on Have I Got News for You. In 1999, when Whiteley was a guest, the numbers game was copied along with the clock music and at the end of the show was a conundrum, "PHANIOILS", to which the answer was Ian Hislop. In 2004, when Vorderman was a guest, one of the usual rounds was replaced with a conundrum round based on the week's news. When Vorderman hosted Have I Got News in 2006, one of the rounds was the "Spinning Conundrum Numbers Round", altering the "Spinning Headlines" round by adding a number to a picture relating to the week's news; at the end of the round, the six numbers from the picture were used for a numbers game.

Richard Whiteley was the victim of a practical joke while presenting the show in 1998. The contestants and rounds had been planted as part of a "Gotcha!", a regular prank feature on the light entertainment show Noel's House Party. In the prank, both the two contestants and Dictionary Corner missed the word something from the letters OMETHINGS, and from another selection, both of the contestants declared "I've got diarrhoea" referring to the selection. In the numbers round that followed, the male contestant "answered" the puzzle by concatenating 6, 2, and 3 to make the target of 623. Whiteley did not uncover the joke until House Party presenter Noel Edmonds appeared on the set, having revealed the unusually short conundrum of HOGCAT to be "gotcha" at the end of the programme.

In a 2003 episode of Top Gear, Richard Whiteley participated in the "Star in a Reasonably Priced Car" segment. Before Whiteley's lap was shown, presenter Jeremy Clarkson played a game of Countdown with Whiteley, using words such as imin (Mini), sexul (Lexus), nevor lard (Land Rover), mushi bits (Mitsubishi) and pianos shiazu (Hispano-Suiza).

It was also referred to on Harry Hill's TV Burp twice. The first time it was referred to was when "Dev" (Coronation Street) made a sound like Countdown end of thirty seconds time. The second time was when the competition "Where Has The Knitted Character Been This Week?" had the answer "on Rachel Riley's chair".

On 2 July 2010, the game was featured in the series 4 episode "The Final Countdown" of The IT Crowd. Moss stuns everyone, including Jeff Stelling and Rachel Riley (both playing themselves), by declaring that the 9 letter string TNETENNBA is in fact a word. Later, Moss becomes an octochamp and is consequently invited into an underground club named "8+", where he competes in a game of "Street Countdown" as part of a spoof of Boogie Town. The episode featured a cameo from Gyles Brandreth, a regular contributor to Dictionary Corner.

British entertainer Stevie Riks has parodied the show in one of his many YouTube comedy videos.

In an episode from spring 2011, the Blackpool-supporting producer of the show arranged the conundrum PNECRISIS ("priciness"), poking fun at their local rivals Preston North End's relegation from the Championship in the 2010–11 season.

=== Non-canon games ===
The game has also been played on a number of different programmes, notably as the first challenge in "What's Next" on Ant and Dec's Saturday Night Takeaway, featuring the pair versus one of the duo's old head teachers. In 2010, it was played as a shopping task on the final Channel 4 series of Celebrity Big Brother, with a team of housemates competing in the house against the then current champion, Chris Davies, in the Countdown studio via satellite. The housemates failed this task.

== Community ==
In 2008, Charlie Reams, who was runner up of Series 59 in that year, created a website called Apterous, which allows people to play simulated games of Countdown online. Members of this site are called Apterites. Every series champion since 2008 inclusive has been a member.

Since 2005, Ben Wilson, the champion of Series 46, has organised a Countdown event in Lincoln, abbreviated COLIN. The event usually takes place on a Saturday in January. COLIN is played across three rounds. Players are drawn onto tables of three (if the number of humans participating is not a multiple of three, bots are used). There are three games per round per table – each contestant takes one turn at hosting the game, and two turns as a contestant. In Round 1, tables are allocated randomly. In Rounds 2 and 3, players are allocated tables based on how well they’ve performed up to that point. Afterwards, a final takes place between the two best players (sorted by number of wins and then by number of points). Whoever wins the final is declared the overall winner of the event. Since 2014, a hangover takes place the main day after the main COLIN. The hangover takes place over two rounds. For the hangover, players are allocated one of two teams; there is a White team and a Blue team. In person events have since expanded to other locations (e.g. Bristol, Edinburgh)

Since 2016, most Countdown events have been part of “FOCAL” (Finals of the Co-events Annual League). Players earn points based on how well they have done at their events. The top 8 are invited to a final, where they play against the seven other finalists. Afterwards, a final takes place between the two best players (sorted by number of wins and then by number of points). Whoever wins the final is declared FOCAL Champion.

== Transmissions ==
=== Regular ===
Series	Start date	End date	Episodes		Main presenter	Notes
Series	Start date	End date	Series	Cumulative	Main presenter	Notes
1	2 November 1982	16 December 1982	27	27	Richard Whiteley	First series to be hosted by Richard Whiteley, who was assisted by Cathy Hytner, Beverley Isherwood, Linda Barrett and Carol Vorderman. The first to feature the Pastel set and filmed at the Yorkshire Television Studios in Leeds. Mary Craig was the original and only lexicographer in Series 1.
2	5 April 1983	2 July 1983	53	80	Richard Whiteley	Last series to feature Barrett who alternated as 'vital statistician' with Vorderman. Angela O'Dougherty stood in for Hytner for five episodes. Only series to feature Joyce Hawkins and Lesley Burnett as lexicographers.
3	19 September 1983	15 December 1983	52	132	Richard Whiteley	Last series to feature Isherwood as 'Numbers Girl' who left after 21 November. First series with Julia Swannell and Yvonne Warburton as lexicographers.
4	2 April 1984	28 June 1984	52	184	Richard Whiteley	
5	15 October 1984	21 December 1984	50	234	Richard Whiteley	Championship of Champions I aired on 15–23 October. Yvonne Warburton was the sole lexicographer this series.
6	7 January 1985	21 March 1985	54	288	Richard Whiteley	First series to feature Della Thompson and the last with Warburton as lexicographer.
7	14 October 1985	20 December 1985	50	338	Richard Whiteley	First series to be affected by horse racing.
8	6 January 1986	27 March 1986	59	397	Richard Whiteley	Only series to feature Hilary McGlynn as lexicographer.
9	31 March 1986	3 June 1986	47	444	Richard Whiteley	Championship of Champions II aired on 31 March–8 April. First series to feature Catherine Clarke as lexicographer.
10	13 October 1986	19 December 1986	50	494	Richard Whiteley	Championship of Champions I & II aired on 13 October. First series with Freda Thornton as lexicographer.
11	2 February 1987	10 April 1987	50	544	Richard Whiteley	500th episode aired on 9 February.
12	13 April 1987	19 June 1987	50	594	Richard Whiteley	
13	22 June 1987	28 August 1987	50	644	Richard Whiteley	Championship of Champions III aired on 22–30 June. Last series to feature Hytner as 'Letters Girl'.
14	5 October 1987	25 December 1987	63	707	Richard Whiteley	First series to feature Karen Loughlin as 'Letters Girl'.
15	11 April 1988	17 June 1988	50	757	Richard Whiteley	Countdown was not broadcast on 11 January – 1 April because of Fifteen to One, it remained that way until 1996. Last series to feature Swannell as lexicographer.
16	20 June 1988	2 September 1988	55	812	Richard Whiteley	Last series to feature Loughlin as 'Letters Girl'.
17	2 January 1989	17 March 1989	55	867	Richard Whiteley	Championship of Champions IV aired on 2–10 January. Last series to feature the Pastel set and separate co-hosts. Only series with Lucy Summers as 'Letters Girl' and Georgia Hole as lexicographer.
18	10 July 1989	13 October 1989	70	937	Richard Whiteley	First series to feature the wooden set, Simon Mason as lexicographer and to have Vorderman placing both letters and numbers on the board.
19	1 January 1990	30 March 1990	65	1,002	Richard Whiteley	1,000th episode aired on 28 March.
20	2 July 1990	28 September 1990	65	1,067	Richard Whiteley	First series to feature Mark Nyman, winner of the inaugural Championship of Champions and later show producer, as a lexicographer.
21	31 December 1990	29 March 1991	65	1,132	Richard Whiteley	Championship of Champions V aired on 31 December–8 January. Last series to feature the wooden set, Thompson and Mason as lexicographers and to feature rematches in the case of tied games. The first series with Alexandra Clayton, Judy Pearsall and Richard Samson.
22	1 July 1991	27 September 1991	65	1,197	Richard Whiteley	First series to feature the red Wings set and tie-break conundrums and last to feature Clayton as lexicographer.
23	30 December 1991	27 March 1992	65	1,262	Richard Whiteley	Last series with Thornton as lexicographer.
24	29 June 1992	25 September 1992	65	1,327	Richard Whiteley	First series to feature Susie Dent as lexicographer, also the only series with Sara Tulloch and the last featuring Pearsall in the role.
25	4 January 1993	2 April 1993	65	1,392	Richard Whiteley	Championship of Champions VI aired on 4–12 January.
26	5 July 1993	1 October 1993	65	1,457	Richard Whiteley	First series with Ruth Killick as lexicographer.
27	3 January 1994	1 April 1994	65	1,522	Richard Whiteley	1,500th episode aired on 2 March.
28	4 July 1994	30 September 1994	65	1,587	Richard Whiteley	
29	2 January 1995	31 March 1995	65	1,652	Richard Whiteley	Championship of Champions VII aired on 2–10 January.
30	3 July 1995	29 September 1995	65	1,717	Richard Whiteley	Last series to feature the red Wings set and Killick as lexicographer.
31	1 January 1996	29 March 1996	65	1,782	Richard Whiteley	First series to feature the purple Wings set, with the Extra Intensity clock music being used for the first twelve episodes and with Catherine Stokes and Kendall Clarke as lexicographers. Last series to be affected by Channel 4's rival gameshow Fifteen to One.
32	1 July 1996	27 September 1996	65	1,847	Richard Whiteley	Last series to feature Kendall Clarke as lexicographer.
33	30 September 1996	20 December 1996	60	1,907	Richard Whiteley	Championship of Champions VIII aired on 30 September–8 October the remainder of series was the Supreme Championship. First series to air all-year round and only to feature David Swarbrick as lexicographer.
34	30 December 1996	28 March 1997	65	1,972	Richard Whiteley	First series with Rob Scriven but the only series to feature Joanna Kay, David Howson and Michael Cox as lexicographers.
35	31 March 1997	27 June 1997	65	2,037	Richard Whiteley	2,000th retrospective episode aired on 7 May presented by Fifteen to One host William G. Stewart. First series with Peter Sweasey, Hania Porucznik and Alyson McGaw but last to feature Scriven as lexicographer.
36	30 June 1997	26 September 1997	65	2,102	Richard Whiteley	First series to feature Hannah Robertson but the last to feature Stokes, Porucznik, Sweasey and McGaw as lexicographers.
37	29 September 1997	19 December 1997	60	2,162	Richard Whiteley	Last series to run for three months and the first series to have the Champion's and Challenger's chairs. First series with Anna Eaton and the only series to feature Sarah Kinsella as lexicographer.
38	29 December 1997	26 June 1998	130	2,292	Richard Whiteley	Championship of Champions IX aired on 29 December–16 January. First series to run for six months.
39	29 June 1998	25 December 1998	130	2,422	Richard Whiteley	
40	28 December 1998	25 June 1999	130	2,552	Richard Whiteley	First series with Damian Eadie, the champion of Series 28 and the last to feature both Eaton, now Hall and Robertson as lexicographers.
41	28 June 1999	25 December 1999	121	2,673	Richard Whiteley	Last series to feature the purple Wings set.
42	27 December 1999	23 June 2000	124	2,797	Richard Whiteley	Championship of Champions X aired on 27–31 December. First series to feature the orange Wings set as well as the green score displays and target display on CECIL. First series with Tania Styles and last to feature Nyman as lexicographer.
43	26 June 2000	25 December 2000	114	2,911	Richard Whiteley	18th Birthday episode aired on 2 November. Only series to feature Penny Silva and the first with Gillian Evans as lexicographer.
44	26 December 2000	29 June 2001	131	3,042	Richard Whiteley	3,000th episode aired on 27 April. Last series with Clarke and Evans as lexicographers.
45	2 July 2001	21 September 2001	43	3,085	Richard Whiteley	Last series to use the 9-round-format and 30-minute runtime. First series since Series 37 to run for 3 months.
46	24 September 2001	25 December 2001	67	3,152	Richard Whiteley	First series to use the original 15-round-format and 45-minute runtime and to feature Clare Pemberton and Phiona Stanley as lexicographers. Last series since Series 37 to run for 3 months.
47	26 December 2001	28 June 2002	127	3,279	Richard Whiteley	This series returned to a 6 month run. Junior Championship aired on 12–14 March. Last series to feature Pemberton, Kay Celtel (only appeared in this series) and Styles as lexicographers.
48	1 July 2002	20 December 2002	110	3,389	Richard Whiteley	Last series to feature the orange Wings set and Phiona Stanley and Damian Eadie as lexicographers.
49	6 January 2003	27 June 2003	122	3,511	Richard Whiteley	Championship of Champions XI aired on 6–24 January and Ladies' Championship aired on 11–13 March. First series to feature Alison Heard and the pink and purple striped set.
50	30 June 2003	19 December 2003	103	3,614	Richard Whiteley	Last series to feature Samson as a lexicographer.
51	5 January 2004	25 June 2004	114	3,728	Richard Whiteley	
52	28 June 2004	17 December 2004	112	3,840	Richard Whiteley	Last series to feature Heard as a regular lexicographer.
53	4 January 2005	1 July 2005	119	3,959	Richard Whiteley	First series where Susie Dent was sole lexicographer. Last series to be hosted by Richard Whiteley, he died on 26 June 2005 after the last five shows were in post-production.
54	31 October 2005	26 May 2006	153	4,112	Des Lynam	First series to be hosted by Des Lynam. 4,000th episode aired on 4 January. Saturday episodes aired between 7 January and 8 April.
55	29 May 2006	22 December 2006	150	4,262	Des Lynam	Championship of Champions XII aired on 29 May–16 June. Last series to be hosted by Des Lynam.
56	2 January 2007	22 June 2007	120	4,382	Des O'Connor	First series to be hosted by Des O'Connor. Michael Wylie, who was the runner-up of Series 1 and later assistant show producer, made three appearances in the role of lexicographer, filling in for Dent who was absent due to illness.
57	25 June 2007	21 December 2007	126	4,508	Des O'Connor	25th Birthday episode aired on 2 November. Alison Heard returned as lexicographer for the last two months of the series as Dent was on maternity leave.
58	2 January 2008	20 June 2008	119	4,627	Des O'Connor	Heard continued as stand-in for Dent, who was maternity leave until February.
59	23 June 2008	12 December 2008	105	4,732	Des O'Connor	Last series to be hosted by Des O'Connor and Carol Vorderman, also the last series to feature the pink and purple striped set.
60	12 January 2009	19 June 2009	111	4,843	Jeff Stelling	Championship of Champions XIII aired on 12–30 January. First series to be hosted by Jeff Stelling and Rachel Riley, also the first series to feature the original blue set and the last series filmed at the Yorkshire Television Studios in Leeds.
61	22 June 2009	18 December 2009	110	4,953	Jeff Stelling	First series filmed at the Granada Studios in Manchester.
62	11 January 2010	18 June 2010	110	5,063	Jeff Stelling	5,000th episode aired on 23 March.
63	21 June 2010	17 December 2010	115	5,178	Jeff Stelling	Last series to allow contestants under the age of 16 to participate on the show.
64	10 January 2011	3 June 2011	100	5,278	Jeff Stelling	
65	6 June 2011	16 December 2011	120	5,398	Jeff Stelling	Last series to be hosted by Jeff Stelling.
66	9 January 2012	29 June 2012	119	5,517	Nick Hewer	First series to be hosted by Nick Hewer.
67	2 July 2012	21 December 2012	97	5,614	Nick Hewer	Last series filmed at the Granada Studios in Manchester as well as the last full series to feature the original 15-round-format and have the green score displays and target display on CECIL.
68	7 January 2013	28 June 2013	107	5,721	Nick Hewer	30th Birthday Championship aired on 7 January – 1 March. First series filmed at MediaCityUK in Salford as well as the first to feature the blue score displays and target display on CECIL, starting on 21 January and the new 15-round format starting on 25 March.
69	1 July 2013	20 December 2013	118	5,839	Nick Hewer	
70	6 January 2014	27 June 2014	107	5,946	Nick Hewer	Last series to use a paper dictionary for word adjudication.
71	30 June 2014	19 December 2014	110	6,056	Nick Hewer	First series to use ODO (Oxford Dictionary Online) for word adjudication. 6,000th episode aired on 29 September.
72	5 January 2015	12 June 2015	100	6,156	Nick Hewer	
73	15 June 2015	23 December 2015	121	6,277	Nick Hewer	
74	4 January 2016	24 June 2016	107	6,384	Nick Hewer	Championship of Champions XIV aired on 4–22 January.
75	27 June 2016	23 December 2016	109	6,493	Nick Hewer	Last series to be affected by horse racing which moved to ITV on 1 January 2017.
76	3 January 2017	30 June 2017	121	6,614	Nick Hewer	Last series to feature the original blue set.
77	3 July 2017	22 December 2017	122	6,736	Nick Hewer	First series to feature the new blue set.
78	2 January 2018	22 June 2018	117	6,853	Nick Hewer	
79	25 June 2018	21 December 2018	126	6,979	Nick Hewer	
80	2 January 2019	28 June 2019	128	7,107	Nick Hewer	Championship of Champions XV aired on 2–22 January. 7,000th episode aired on 30 January.
81	1 July 2019	20 December 2019	124	7,231	Nick Hewer	
82	2 January 2020	18 December 2020	182 (Note: Series 82 consisted of 182 episodes, but the episode that was due to be broadcast on 24 March was pulled from the schedules because of a comment made by Nick Hewer that could have been deemed insensitive in relation to the pandemic.)	7,413	Nick Hewer	This series was impacted by the COVID-19 pandemic, resulting in a hiatus on 4 May–7 August. Three special additional episodes were broadcast on 21–23 December which were guest-hosted by Colin Murray. Former host Des O'Connor died on 14 November 2020 and the episode aired on 16 November was dedicated to his memory.
83	4 January 2021	25 June 2021	125	7,538	Nick Hewer	Last series to be hosted by Nick Hewer. Colin Murray presented the episodes on 13 January–9 February and 3–16 March as Hewer shielded at home because of the second COVID-19 lockdown and after he was vaccinated, both of which occurred during this series' recording.
84	28 June 2021	23 December 2021	128	7,666	Anne Robinson	First series to be hosted by Anne Robinson and have two different mathematicians as Dr Anne-Marie Imafidon stood in for Rachel Riley at the end of the series due to the latter departing for maternity leave. On 10 September, Trevor McDonald guest-presented a special episode as part of Channel 4's Black To Front Day with Dr Anne-Marie Imafidon and Lemn Sissay as lexicographer.
85	3 January 2022	17 June 2022	120	7,786	Anne Robinson	Dr Anne-Marie Imafidon continued as mathematician until 14 March with Rachel Riley returning the following day. Last full series to be hosted by Anne Robinson.
86	20 June 2022	23 December 2022	135	7,921	Anne Robinson; Colin Murray	Only series to have more than one official host. Robinson departed the show on 13 July and Murray replaced her as the host on 14 July. Guest hosts took over Murray's hosting duties on 31 October–25 November as part of the show's 40th anniversary celebrations with Floella Benjamin on 31 October–4 November, Richard Coles on 7–11 November, Trevor McDonald 14–18 November and Moira Stuart on 21–25 November. Les Dennis hosted on 4–15 August and Jenny Eclair hosted on 16–19 August because Murray tested positive for COVID-19.
87	2 January 2023	29 June 2023	129	8,050	Colin Murray	Championship of Champions XVI aired on 2–20 January. 8,000th episode aired on 20 April. First full series to be hosted by Colin Murray who was announced as the new permanent host on 11 January. Ended prematurely due to Rachel Riley falling ill during a recording.
88	30 June 2023	22 December 2023	126	8,176	Colin Murray	Featured former host Jeff Stelling as a guest in Dictionary Corner on 21–25 August.
89	2 January 2024	28 June 2024	129	8,305	Colin Murray	The theme tune was played on piano on 29 April–3 May to promote Series 2 of The Piano.
90	1 July 2024	20 December 2024	118	8,423	Colin Murray	Due to coverage of the 2024 Summer Paralympics, the series was taken off air on 29 August–6 September.
91	6 January 2025	27 June 2025	125	8,548	Colin Murray	Dr Tom Crawford stood in for Riley on 24 February–14 March while she worked on another project.
92	30 June 2025	19 December 2025	125	8,673	Colin Murray	
93	5 January 2026	26 June 2026	125	8,798	Colin Murray	Les Dennis stood in for Murray who was absent on 2–6 February due to heath issues.
94	29 June 2026	December 2026	TBA	TBA	Colin Murray	As of 31 August, contestants are known by their forenames only.

=== Masters ===
Series	Start date	End date	Episodes	Presenter	Notes
1	3 April 1989	30 March 1990	52	Richard Whiteley	Clarke and Thornton featured as lexicographers.
2	2 April 1990	29 March 1991	52	Richard Whiteley	Clarke, Thornton, Thompson, Mason and Nyman all featured as lexicographers.

=== Celebrity ===
Series	Start date	End date	Episodes	Presenter	Notes
1	23 April 1998	18 June 1998	8	Richard Whiteley	Eaton, Dent and Nyman featured as lexicographers.
2	12 November 2019	9 January 2020	6	Nick Hewer	

=== Specials ===
Date	Special	Presenter
25 December 1997	Christmas Special	William G. Stewart
26 May 2003	Husband & Wife	Richard Whiteley
25 July 2003	Replayed Series 40 Final	Richard Whiteley
4 August 2003	High Scoring Losers	Richard Whiteley
18 August 2003	Maths Teachers	Richard Whiteley
25 August 2003	Solicitors	Richard Whiteley
2 September 2003	Clergymen	Richard Whiteley
3 September 2003	Scrabble Masters	Richard Whiteley
8 September 2003	Replayed Series 31 Final	Richard Whiteley
9 September 2003	Champions of Champions IX & X	Richard Whiteley
10 September 2003	Police Officers	Richard Whiteley
11 September 2003	High Scoring Losers II	Richard Whiteley
12 September 2003	Series 47 & 48 Champions	Richard Whiteley
15 March 2004	Publicans	Richard Whiteley
19 March 2004	Father & Daughter	Richard Whiteley
14 June 2004	Replayed Series 35 Final	Richard Whiteley
26 July 2004	Replayed Series 39 Final	Richard Whiteley
2 August 2004	Aficionados	Richard Whiteley
13 August 2004	Replayed Series 37 Final	Richard Whiteley
23 August 2004	Mother & Son	Richard Whiteley
30 August 2004	Starlets	Richard Whiteley
20 December 2004	Brothers	Richard Whiteley
25 March 2005	Cabaret Entertainers	Richard Whiteley
30 May 2005	Starlets	Richard Whiteley
15 March 2010	Series 60 & 61 Champions	Jeff Stelling
26 July 2010	High Scoring Losers III	Jeff Stelling
2 August 2010	Young Stars	Jeff Stelling
16 August 2010	Replayed Series 59 Final	Jeff Stelling
14 March 2011	Deciding Special	Jeff Stelling
25 July 2011	Female Finalists	Jeff Stelling
12 March 2012	Sister & Brother	Nick Hewer
30 July 2012	Series 64 & 65 Champions	Nick Hewer
13 September 2012	Female Winners	Nick Hewer
14 September 2012	Husband & Wife	Nick Hewer
28 September 2012	Male Finalists	Nick Hewer
2 July 2013	Lovebirds	Nick Hewer
12 December 2014	Battle of the Bobbys	Nick Hewer
22 December 2014	Senior Females	Nick Hewer
23 December 2014	Battle of the Mc's	Nick Hewer
6 April 2015	Sisters	Nick Hewer
10 April 2015	Law & Order	Nick Hewer
8 May 2015	Veterans	Nick Hewer
21 December 2020	Battle of Bingley	Colin Murray
22 December 2020	Series 63 & 69 Champions	Colin Murray
23 December 2020	All-time greats	Colin Murray

== Spin-offs ==
- Countdown Masters was a regular feature segment within The Channel Four Daily, throughout its run from 1989 to 1992. It had the same hosts and rules as the standard game but was played in shorter bite-sized chunks. It was abbreviated: for example, the letters were chosen all in one go as "x vowels and y consonants" and there was no celebrity guest in "Dictionary Corner".
- 8 Out of 10 Cats Does Countdown has comedian Jimmy Carr as host and team captains Jon Richardson and Sean Lock (until his death in 2021) as regular contestants. Susie Dent and Rachel Riley fill their normal roles. It uses similar rules to the standard game, but has a strong comedy element, a reduced number of rounds, and is two against two. It began in 2012 and continues airing new episodes; as of 31 January 2025, 167 episodes of 8 Out of 10 Cats Does Countdown have aired.
- Celebrity Countdown had celebrities competing on the show without the cast of 8 Out of 10 Cats and with its usual presenters. Only two series have been broadcast; Series 1 in 1998 and Series 2 in 2019–2020. Both series used a modified format and were broadcast in the evening, the second of which was aired on More4.

== See also ==
- List of Countdown champions
- International versions of Countdown

== Sources ==
- Countdown: Spreading the Word (Granada Media, 2001) ISBN 0-233-99976-0
