= List of schools in Luton =

List of schools and academies in Luton, a large town in Bedfordshire, England

This is a list of schools in Luton, in Bedfordshire, England.

== State-funded schools ==
=== Primary schools ===
- Beech Hill Community Primary School
- Beechwood Primary School
- Bramingham Primary School
- Bushmead Primary School
- Chantry Primary Academy
- Cutenhoe Hill Primary School and Nursery (formerly Surrey Street Primary School)
- Crawley Green Infant School
- Dallow Primary School
- Denbigh Primary School
- Downside Primary School
- Farley Junior Academy
- The Ferrars Academy
- Ferrars Junior School
- Foxdell Infant School
- Foxdell Junior School
- Hillborough Infant School
- Hillborough Junior School
- Icknield Primary School
- Leagrave Primary School
- The Linden Academy
- Maidenhall Primary School
- The Meads Primary School
- Norton Road Primary School
- Parklea Primary School
- Pirton Hill Primary School
- Putteridge Primary School
- Ramridge Primary School
- River Bank Primary School
- Sacred Heart RC Primary School
- St Joseph's RC Primary School
- St Margaret of Scotland RC Primary School
- St Martin de Porres RC Primary School
- St Matthew's Primary School
- Someries Infant School
- Someries Junior School
- Southfield Primary School
- Stopsley Community Primary School
- Tennyson Road Primary School
- Warden Hill Infant School
- Warden Hill Junior School
- Waulud Primary School
- Wenlock CE Academy
- Whipperley Infant Academy
- Whitefield Primary Academy
- Wigmore Primary School
- William Austin Infant School
- William Austin Junior School

=== Secondary schools ===
- Cardinal Newman Catholic School
- The Chalk Hills Academy
- Challney High School for Boys
- Challney High School for Girls
- Chiltern Academy
- Denbigh High School
- Icknield High School
- Lea Manor High School
- Lealands High School
- Putteridge High School
- Queen Elizabeth School
- Stockwood Park Academy
- Stopsley High School

=== Special and alternative schools ===
- Avenue Centre for Education
- Lady Zia Wernher School
- Richmond Hill School
- Windmill Hill School
- Woodlands Secondary School

=== Further education ===
- Barnfield College
- Luton Sixth Form College

== Independent schools ==
=== Primary and preparatory schools ===
- Kings House Preparatory School
- Mehria Primary School
- Oakwood Primary School
- Olive Tree Primary School

=== Senior and all-through schools ===
- Al-Hikmah Boys' School
- Al-Hikmah Girls' School
- Jamiatul Uloom Al - Islamia

=== Special and alternative schools ===
- Active Support Education Centre
