= Challney High School =

Challney High School is the name of two separate comprehensive secondary schools located in the Challney area of Luton, Bedfordshire, England:

- Challney High School for Boys, a community college and school for boys ages 11 - 16
- Challney High School for Girls, a school for girls ages 11 - 16
