= Rachel de Souza =

Children's Commissioner for England

Dame Rachel de Souza DBE

Children's Commissioner for England
- Incumbent
- Assumed office 2021
- Preceded by: Anne Longfield

Personal details
- Born: Rachel Mary Kenny; 1968 (age 57–58) Scunthorpe, Lincolnshire, England
- Education: Heythrop College, University of London; King's College London
- Occupation: Educationalist

Dame Rachel Mary de Souza DBE (née Kenny; born 12 January 1968) is the Children's Commissioner for England. She is a British educationalist, a former headteacher and founding chief executive of the Inspiration Trust.

She was appointed DBE in the 2014 New Year Honours "for services to education". The ceremony was held at Buckingham Palace and performed by the Princess Royal.

== Early life ==
Born in Scunthorpe in 1968, Rachel Kenny has three brothers. Her father David was a steelworker, while her mother Renate Telewny arrived in England as a refugee.

She attended St Bede's Catholic Voluntary Academy, a local Roman Catholic comprehensive school, then attended the John Leggott College, gaining A-levels in English and Religious Studies in 1986. She graduated as BA in Philosophy and Theology from Heythrop College, University of London. After a year working in museums and office receptions, she received a PGCE and MA in Education from King's College London, moving with her husband to further his studies at Jesus College, Oxford.

== Career in education ==
During her career, de Souza taught in Oxfordshire, Tower Hamlets and Luton Sixth Form College, and later served as deputy head at Denbigh High School, Luton.

Her first headship was at Barnfield West Academy in Luton, before being appointed principal of Ormiston Victory Academy (Costessey, Norwich). In 2012, she co-founded the Inspiration Trust, a multi-academy trust based in Norwich. She grew the Trust to include schools across Norfolk and Suffolk.

== Children's Commissioner ==
De Souza became Children's Commissioner for England on 1 March 2021. As Commissioner she advocates for the views of children in England, as well as children in England, Wales, Scotland and Northern Ireland on UK Parliamentary reserved matters, such as immigration.

=== Surveys ===
At the start of her tenure De Souza said that it is important to listen to what children have to say about the experience of lockdown. In her first month as Children's Commissioner, De Souza launched the Big Ask Survey of children.

In 2024, the Big Ambition survey found that 22% of children agreed that people who run the country listen to what they have to say.

De Souza launched an Attendance Audit in January 2022 to speak to children missing from and struggling to engage with education. She said that absence rates were "stuck at crisis levels" but argued "children aren’t absent because they don’t want to learn". De Souza then chaired the Greater Manchester Local Attendance Action Alliance.

=== Schools ===
De Souza published her Children’s Plan in London in 2025 alongside the Education Secretary. She argued that the census, which gathered data from nearly 90% of schools in England, painted a stark picture of schools filling gaps left by years of underfunding in health, social care, and local support services. In 2026 the Government announced it will create a new remit for the Children’s Commissioner to provide independent oversight and scrutiny of SEND reform.

=== Equal protection from assault ===
During an evidence session to the Education Select Committee before her appointment, at a time when numerous Children's Commissioners, including those for Wales and Scotland, had already committed to banning corporal punishment of children, de Souza was criticised for failing to do so. However, early into her role, having started on 1 March 2021, she said she was against violence of any form towards children, and in an article for the Times 20 April 2022 she said she was supportive of a ban being introduced in England. Following the murder of Sara Sharif, she reiterated her position, calling for the end of the "reasonable chastisement" clause that exists as a defence to assault against children in English law.

=== Online Safety ===
Ahead of the passage of the Online Safety Act, De Souza published analysis of a nationally representative survey of 8-17 year olds finding that nearly half had seen harmful content online. And called for the Online Safety Act to keep child safety ‘at its heart.’

Prior to the Government’s announcement of a social media ban, De Souza called for all online services - including gaming sites - that make use of harmful features and functionalities to be banned from accessing children under 18 until they can prove they are safe for children.

=== Mental health and wellbeing ===
Since February 2022, de Souza has published an annual mental health briefing on children's experiences of mental health services. Her most recent report found the number of young people being referred for mental health treatment in England had risen to more than a million. She said she was ‘in no doubt we are facing a crisis’. De Souza has called for long-term strategies to address these issues, emphasising the need for early intervention.

=== Strip searching of children by police forces ===
The case of Child Q, a 15-year-old black girl who was strip-searched at school without an appropriate adult present, led de Souza to investigate the practice of strip-searching of children by police with her last showing that black children were more than eight times likely to be strip searched than their white peers.

=== Immigration and migrant children ===
As part of her role as Children's Commissioner, de Souza visits reception centres and processing sites including in Kent where migrants who illegally cross the Channel in small boats are temporarily held during processing. In June 2026 she told the Home Secretary that her crackdown on refused asylum seekers, including the forcible removal of children from the UK will cause significant harm.

== Personal life ==
De Souza met her future husband Chris, at 18, during her first week at Heythrop College in London. Chris was ten years her senior, is a former Jesuit, whose dentist parents originated from Goa. She married Chris De Souza subsequently and they continued their educational journey, Chris went into the Probation Service, and they have a son.
