= First News =

British children's weekly newspaper

- Type: Children's weekly newspaper
- Owner: First Group Enterprises
- Founded: May 2006
- Language: English
- Headquarters: London
- Country: United Kingdom
- Website: www.firstnews.co.uk

First News is a UK weekly print and digital newspaper for young readers. It is published in a full colour tabloid format every Friday, and aims to present current events and politics in a child-friendly format, alongside news on entertainment, sport and computer games. The paper is aimed at seven to fourteen-year-olds, and regularly features written work from readers of that age.

First News was founded by Sarah and Steve Thomson and launched by editor Nicky Cox, with Piers Morgan as editorial director, in May 2006 at 11 Downing Street, the official residence of the UK's Chancellor of the Exchequer. The first issues were priced at £1, with 5 per cent of proceeds benefiting children's charities. Morgan was editor until 2007, and has no editorial or financial ties to First News as of 2026.

From 2006, the paper was published by First News (UK) Ltd, an independently financed publishing house established in January 2006. In February 2018, First News (UK) Ltd was renamed First Group Enterprises. Following the name change, the company went on to launch two new products: First Wonder Box and First Careers. The first, a subscription box for ages four to eight; the latter, a careers guidance website. The management team of First Group Enterprises is composed of newspaper editor Cox, former editorial director of BBC Children's Magazines, with a steering role from the Thomsons, who were investors.

As of 2018, First News began leading the annual Takeover Challenge event. Formally an initiative by the Children's Commissioner for England, the event is designed to allow children and young people the opportunity to "gain experience of a workplace, while organisations benefit from a fresh perspective on their work."

== Educational usage ==
In 2015, First News commissioned the National Literacy Trust to evaluate the use of a children's newspaper in the classroom and its benefit to reading comprehension. The evaluation found that children's reading progressed significantly over the eight-week period of activity, and reported reading more widely (particularly non-fiction) after having taken part in the activity.

First News launched a digital literacy platform, with content based on the weekly newspaper in 2016. Named the 'First News iHub', the platform received the BETT Award for Primary Digital Content in 2017
