= Stockwood Park Academy =

Secondary Academy in Luton, Bedfordshire, England

The Stockwood Park Academy

Location
- Rotheram Avenue; Luton, Bedfordshire, LU1 5PP; England; 51.869544°N 0.435705°W

Information
- Type: Academy
- Motto: Strive Achieve Believe
- Established: 1965
- Sister school: The Chalk Hills Academy
- Local authority: Luton
- Department for Education URN: 135338 Tables
- Ofsted: Reports
- Principal: Mumin Humayun
- Gender: mixed
- Age: 11 to 18
- Colour: Green
- Publication: TSPA Times
- Website: thestockwoodparkacademy.co.uk

The Stockwood Park Academy is a mixed secondary school and sixth form located in Rotheram Avenue Luton, Bedfordshire, England and is part of Advantage Schools, a multi-academy trust in Bedford, Luton and Central Bedfordshire.

The school was previously located in Cutenhoe Road, but in 2011 it moved to a new £30 million building, including a 300-seat theatre, situated on the old playing field of the former Rotheram High School.

== History ==
What is now Stockwood Park Academy was formed by the amalgamation of Stockwood and Rotheram High Schools.

Stockwood High School in Cutenhoe Road was described as Luton's most expensive school when it was built in 1967. It was sound-proofed to cut out noise due to it being situated beneath a Luton Airport flight path. Facilities included an indoor heated swimming pool and two halls. The official opening was held in October 1968.

In 1988 Rotheram High School, a school situated in Farley Hill approximately a mile away from Stockwood High School, was closed due to administrative costs and falling attendance numbers. The majority of pupils from Rotheram High School moved to Stockwood High School, which was renamed South Luton High School.

The school converted to academy status on 1 September 2007, and was renamed Barnfield South Academy as part of the Barnfield Federation. In March 2011, the school moved to a new £30 million building situated on the old playing field of the former Rotheram High School site, equipped with ICT facilities, including a 300-seat theatre. The Barnfield Federation launched a new A-Level sixth form provision in September 2011 based across its academies.

In 2015 the school changed its name to South Academy and became part of The Shared Learning Trust. In 2016 it was renamed Stockwood Park Academy. The sixth form provision was also renamed to The Sixth Form in 2016, with the sixth form being run across Stockwood Park Academy and its sister school The Chalk Hills Academy.

== Notable pupils ==
=== Stockwood High School ===
- Lee Ross (actor)

== See also ==
- List of schools in Luton
