= Chris Rogers (journalist) =

British broadcast journalist

Chris Rogers (born 13 November 1972) is a British broadcast journalist specialising in investigative journalism, and news presenter. He is among the long line up of presenters that began their career presenting the BBC's Newsround, moving on to present and report for Sky News including its BAFTA Award-winning coverage of the 9/11 attacks. He then joined the Channel 4 RI:SE presenting team before heading to ITN's ITV News, and ITV's Tonight documentary series, where he presented and reported for London Today, London Tonight, ITV Evening News and produced and fronted numerous investigations for the News at Ten and the Tonight programme as ITV's Investigative Correspondent. He left ITN in 2009 to present BBC News.

He has also made many investigations as a producer and reporter for the BBC's Panorama and the BBC's Our World documentary series. Since 2017, Rogers has been Creative Director and Executive Producer of the television and online content production company Fresh Start Media, which he co-founded. The company is behind shows like Sky's FYI - a BAFTA Award-winning weekly news show for children. Chris Rogers is the Executive Producer and Programme Editor of FYI and its spin off documentaries FYI Investigates which have won many awards since the programmes launch on Sky News and Sky Kids in 2018. The company also produced Hope Works for Disney and Sky, many documentaries and episodes of CBBC's My Life.

== Television ==
Rogers, at the age of 19, became the youngest ever presenter of the children's daily news programme Newsround on BBC One in 1994. Among his investigative work Rogers is perhaps best known for his many films exposing the plight and poor treatment of abandoned children left in horrific institutions in Eastern Europe, particularly in Romania, just before it joined the EU. He won many awards for his work. In 2008 this led to the reporter taking the Duchess of York and her daughters undercover in Turkey and Romania for a Tonight special, on ITV. Turkey's foreign minister criticised Rogers' use of hidden cameras for breaching privacy and created diplomatic tensions and even the threat of arrest which Rogers later described in a book called Undercover. Rogers spent seven months undercover posing as a trafficker, secretly filming European gangs who sold women to UK brothels.

Rogers is a contributor for the Mail on Sunday and, since 2010, has been a presenter on the BBC News channel, BBC London News and BBC World News. He is also an investigative reporter for BBC News. Among his films for Panorama, Our World, Newsnight and BBC News he has investigated racism in football ahead of Euro 2012 for what was the controversial BBC TV programme Panorama: Stadiums of Hate. Rogers' BBC News report, "Child Sacrifice", exposing witchcraft in Uganda and the United Kingdom, was nominated for an Emmy award in 2012. In November 2010, August 2011 and March 2013 he fronted the BBC News at Six and BBC News at Ten, during separate strikes by BBC journalists.

In 2013, Rogers made a 30-minute investigative report for the BBC's programme Inside Out which uncovered a trend in sex gang child grooming. Rogers spoke to young Sikh girls who had been sexually groomed by gangs of Muslim men. The reporter gained access to the Sikh community and many victims said that to protect their family honour they had never spoke of or reported their abuse. Rogers also travelled to Indonesia where he posed as a coffee importer and uncovered animal cruelty behind a luxury coffee made out of civet cat droppings. Following the programme's broadcast, Harrods removed the civet cat coffee from its shelves. In February 2014 Rogers gained access to North Korea. For a BBC Panorama programme Rogers filmed with the future ruling elite who were studying at a western-funded university (the Pyongyang University of Science and Technology) in Pyongyang and receiving a western-funded education. He also filmed in Pyongyang openly.

For a Panorama Special programme, on 4 June 2014, Rogers reported on what he described as the dark side of Brazil a few days ahead of the World Cup. The film revealed poverty, violence, drugs, and the prostitution of children as young as 9 years old. Panorama – Brazil: In the Shadow of the Stadiums has been described as his best work. The investigative reporter's work included filming undercover in Guatemala in what campaigners describe as the world's worst hospital where patients were filmed by the reporter in terrible conditions and the hospital's director admitted that the patients were sexually abused. In July 2015 Rogers made a special report for BBC News at Ten and Our World, reporting from the UK and Afghanistan on how unaccompanied child asylum seekers who had fled the war-torn country were being allowed to stay in the UK and live with foster families, but when they reached 18, they were deported back to Kabul after spending most of their lives in Britain, unable to speak the Afghan language, with little knowledge of Afghan culture and being terrified for their lives.

In 2015 he became a regular presenter of World News Today on BBC World News, the BBC News Channel and BBC Four. In 2016 Rogers secretly filmed in Thai jails exposing the illegal imprisonment of children. His BBC investigation set out to expose Thailand's treatment of asylum seekers, many being Christians fleeing persecution in Pakistan. Whole families are locked up in jails, some shackled, as the country has not signed up to any international agreements to help refugees and asylum seekers. The BBC's Our World claimed that the UNHCR was invited by Thailand to deal with asylum seekers and find another country for them to go to, but the UN admitted to the BBC it was failing to help those seeking refuge because it was under-resourced. Rogers started 2017 with another investigative BBC London Inside Out Special exposing how British Indian men are travelling to India and duping local women into a quickly arranged marriage with the promise of a new life in the UK – only to exploit them for financial gain or domestic servitude and then abandon them.

In 2017 Chris Rogers launched his own television production company, Fresh Start Media, with Nicky Cox and his long-term co-producer Marshall Corwin. Fresh Start Media was commissioned by Sky Television to make a year-long children's news series called FYI. In a TV first, the show is presented by children and secured a fortnightly slot with Prime Minister Theresa May to be questioned by viewers about issues they are concerned about. The company also makes programmes and documentaries for CBBC's My Life series, the BBC, ITV and CNBC. In 2021 the production company was behind the highly acclaimed climate change documentary 'COP26 In Your Hands' which was introduced by HRH Prince of Wales In 2022 Rogers and his production company won a BAFTA for the FYI series for its coverage of the Ukraine war. Rogers also picked up a Broadcast Award and MIPCOM award in Cannes for his film about children shot in the crossfire of gang and police raids in Brazil.

In 2023 Rogers became the Programme Editor of GB News Breakfast with Eamonn Holmes winning a Tric Award for Best News Programme.

Rogers continues to focus on production making investigative documentaries for BBC One including Slavery on the High Street and Cyber Siege.

== Radio ==
In January 2019 it was announced that Chris Rogers would be a launch presenter on Scala Radio. Bauer Radio group stated that Simon Mayo and Goldie along with Chris Rogers would bring a fresh approach to classical music which had hit an all-time high in popularity. While remaining at the BBC and running his production company Chris Rogers said he would be presenting a Sunday brunch show with guests and headline-makers. Rogers was also a regular stand in presenter on BBC London 94.9's Breakfast and Drivetime. He also had his own radio show on BBC London every Sunday with former Heart FM presenter Harriet Scott. He also presents Outside Source on the BBC World Service. He regularly presented on BBC Radio 5 Live between 2003 and 2005. In his very early career, starting in his teens, Rogers presented 'School's Out' on Buzz FM in Birmingham in 1993, hosted No Limits for Hallam FM and was also a presenter on London's Capital FM.

== Filmography ==
Television shows
Year	Title	Role
1991	PX (BBC Schools)	Presenter
1994–1998	Newsround (BBC)	Presenter/reporter
1998–2000	Sky News	News reporter
2001	Sky News	News presenter
2002	RI:SE (Channel 4)	News presenter
2003–2005	ITV News Channel	News presenter
2005 -2009	ITV News	News presenter/correspondent/investigative reporter
2007–2009	ITV Tonight	Investigative reporter and producer
2009–	BBC News channel, BBC London News, BBC World News; BBC Weekend News, Panorama	News presenter Investigative reporter and producer
2009—	Our World	Investigative reporter & producer
2013–2015	BBC News at Nine	Regular presenter
2015—	World News Today	Regular presenter
2016—2020	Inside Out London	Investigative reporter & producer

== Awards ==
2022: BAFTA Award: FYI Special: Ukraine Invasion - for Sky TV (Executive Producer and Programme Editor)

2022: Venice TV Festival Award: COP26 In Your Hands - for Sky TV (Producer and Director)

2022: PRIX JEUNESSE Award: COP26 In Your Hands - for Sky TV (Producer and Director)

2021: MIPCOM Diversity TV Excellence Award: Kidversation - for Sky TV (Producer and Director)

2021: Royal Television Society Award: Best Children's Programme: FYI Investigates (nom)(Producer and Director)

2021: Broadcast Award: Best Children's Programme: FYI Investigates (Producer and Director)

2020: Rose D'or Award: (Nom) Best Children's Programme: FYI (Executive Producer / Editor)

2020: Voice of the Listener and Viewer Award: FYI (Executive Producer / Editor)

2020: Broadcast Digital Awards; (Nom) Best Children's Programme: FYI Investigates:Coronavirus (Producer and Director)

2019: Broadcast Digital Awards; (Nom) Best Children's Programme: FYI (Executive Producer / Editor)

2019: Banff Rockie World Media Awards: (Nom) Best Non Scripted Youth Programme: FYI (Executive Producer / Editor)

2019: Broadcast Awards: Best Children's Programme: FYI (Executive Producer / Editor)

2015: BAFTA Shortlist: Panorama Special: In the Shadow of the Stadiums (BBC)

2015: Association of International Broadcasters – Best International Investigative Documentary: Our World: The World's Worst Hospital (BBC)

2014: Guild of Food Writers Award: best Programme: Our World Coffee's Cruel Secret (BBC)

2014: Prix Circom Award: Sex Grooming Gangs: The Sikh Code of Silence (BBC)

2012: Emmy Award : Child Sacrifice (BBC)

2012: Human Trafficking Foundation Media Award: Child Sacrifice (BBC)

2011: Human Trafficking Foundation Media Award, 'They're Dying to Get to Britain' Mail on Sunday

2008: Amnesty International Media Award: Palestinian Child POW's (ITV)

2008: Royal Television Society Award: Best programme: London Bombings: One Year On (ITV)

2007: One World Award, 'Romania's Unwanted Children'(ITV)

2007: Royal Television Society: (Nominee) Television Journalist of the Year (Romania's Unwanted Children ITV)
