= Al Aynsley-Green =

English academic

Sir Albert Aynsley-Green

Children's Commissioner for England
- In office 2005–2009
- Succeeded by: Maggie Atkinson

President of the British Medical Association
- In office 2015–2016
- Preceded by: Ilora Finlay
- Succeeded by: Pali Hungin

Personal details
- Born: 30 May 1943 (age 83)
- Scientific career
- Education: Green College, Oxford University
- Known for: Advancing the rights of children and adolescents, Professor Emeritus of Child Health at University College London, first Children's Commissioner for England
- Spouse: Rosemary Anne Aynsley-Green
- Awards: Kt, James Spence Medal
- Fields: paediatric endocrinology
- Workplaces: Guy's Hospital
- Website: www.aynsley-green.com

Sir Albert Aynsley-Green (born 30 May 1943) is a paediatric endocrinologist and professor emeritus of Child Health at University College London. Aynsley-Green is most notable for advancing the idea of the rights of children. He was appointed to the first Children's Commissioner for England in March 2005, serving in this position until 2009. During this time he launched an initiative to publicize and combat bullying.

== Life ==
Aynsley-Green married Rosemary Anne Aynsley-Green née Boucher in 1967 and has two children.

== Career ==
Aynsley-Green started his clinical training at King's College London GKT School of Medical Education at the Guy's Hospital campus. Aynsley-Green then undertook research into Insulin secretion that led to a thesis, that earned him a promotion to D.Phil at the University of Oxford. Having decided to specialise in paediatrics, Aynsley-Green took his clinical training within the hospitals in Oxfordshire, and then moved to the University Children’s Hospital of Zürich to take specialised training as a paediatric endocrinologist.

After returning to the UK, Aynsley-Green was appointed as a clinical lecturer at the University of Oxford, and was then promoted to Fellow of Green College Oxford, with a position as university lecturer.

In 1984, Aynsley-Green was appointed to the position of James Spence Professor of Child Health at Newcastle University.

In 1993, Aynsley-Green was invited to take the Nuffield Chair of Child Health at the Institute of Child Health. With the position was an appointment as an executive director of clinical research and development at Great Ormond Street Hospital.

== NHS Taskforce for Children ==
On 22 July 2000, Aynsley-Green and other colleagues published a paper in which it was argued that children were being ignored in future health plans that the then United Kingdom government was preparing, and that a strategy was needed that would enable children and adolescents to be represented at all levels of health policy. The paper contrasted that while in Scotland, a children's minister had been appointed and in Wales, a children's commissioner was being appointed during the life of the National Assembly for Wales, but in England, a fundamental cultural reorganisation was needed to be realised to benefit children's and adolescents at all levels of healthcare and policy.

On 22 July 2001, Aynsley-Green was appointed to the UK director of children's health-care services by Alan Milburn of the First Blair ministry a position he held until December 2005, when the appointment was taken by Sheila Shribman. Milburn stated that Aynsley-Green's priority will be to spearhead the faster development of the first ever national standards for children's health services.

In August 2001, Aynsley-Green called for the UK Government to create a Children's Commissioner for England. The role was entirely independent from government, with a statutory responsibility to speak for health and well-being needs of the children in England, numbering approximately 11 million.

On 4 October 2004, Aynsley-Green and his colleagues published the National Service Framework for children.

In March 2005, Aynsley-Green became the Children’s Commissioner for England, a position he held until 2010. To achieve the position, children had to be consulted and indeed was the overarching principal. Due to the children, the original name of the office was changed, from Office of the Children's Commissioner to 11 Million a relatively obscure name, but representative of the wishes of the children. Aynsley-Green also had to sit an exam that was written by and marked by the children. The process also included two interrogations by secondary school children.

Aynsley-Green role was considered a controversial choice for the position and after being appointed to the role, he received significant negative press coverage, and considered enemy number one by the press. Catherine Bennett at the time, of The Observer criticised the bleak picture of English childhood that Aynsley-Green offered. Tony McNulty complained about Aynsley-Green opposition to stop and search and that he was wrong in his approach. John Reid Baron Reid of Cardowan, wrote the foreword.

In 2008, as part of their remit, Aynsley-Green along with the other children's commissioners of the other nations of the United Kingdom, produced a report for the United Nations Committee on the Rights of the Children. Although the working of the four commissioners together was evidence that they were working to improve the life of children. The reports conclusion stated that some things had got worse for children since the committee’s Concluding Observations of 2002.

At the end of Aynsley-Green term as Children's Commissioner, he was interviewed by The Daily Telegraph, in 2010. In the interview Aynsley-Green posited that Britain was suffering a deep malaise and could be considered one of the most child hostile countries in the world. Aynsley-Green commented on The Mosquito device, essentially an ultrasonic weapon, used to stop children gathering. Aynsley-Green once headed a campaign to ban it, describing it as the most visible aspect of hostility to the young. Aynsley-Green reported that when he abroad, he would often be asked by Britain was so hostile to children, and that as a people, the British only care about their own children, and not others. Aynsley-Green said in interview, that current healthcare services were still geared towards adults, and worst outcomes for children in the developed world

In a foreword of a report published by the BMA, Aynsley-Green, wrote that the National Service Framework for children was being systematically betrayed by politicians through a lack of political will, and blaming the churn in ministerial appointments, political indifference and failedby the Parliament to hold the Department of Health. Aynsley-Green also said that the Department of Health publishing of a new policy statement, Achieving Equity and Excellence was meant to neutralise Sir Ian Kennedy's highly critical report, on the lack of progress in improving children’s services. In the report Aynsley-Green, expressed in writing a kind of déjà vu that all his previous work and his colleagues, on the National Framework was being repeated.

== Societies ==
Aynsley-Green held the chair of Chair of the Salisbury Diocesan Board of Education from 1 October 2010 and resigned on 1 July 2013. Aynsley-Green served as president of the British Medical Association in 2015–16.

== Honours and awards ==
In 1991, Aynsley-Green was awarded The Andrea Prader Prize for outstanding achievements in leadership, teaching and clinical practice in the field of pediatric endocrinology. The award was named in honour of Andrea Prader, the Swiss scientist, pediatric endocrinologist, who discovered Prader–Willi syndrome. He was elected a Fellow of the Academy of Medical Sciences (FMedSci) in 1998.

Aynsley-Green was knighted in 2006. He is an honorary fellow of Oriel College, Oxford. In 2011, Aynsley-Green was awarded an honorary degree of Doctor of Education at Nottingham Trent University, in recognition of his outstanding contribution to the education and health of children. Aynsley-Green received the James Spence Medal in 2013.

== Bibliography ==
The following are the most cited papers of Aynsley-Green:

- Anand, K.J.S.; Sippell, W.G.; Aynsley-Green, A. (January 1987). "Randomised Trial of Fentanyl Anaesthesia in Preterm Babies Undergoing Surgery: Effects on the Stress Response". The Lancet. 329 (8524): 62–66. doi:10.1016/S0140-6736(87)91907-6. PMID 2879174. S2CID 21766926.
- Bitner-Glindzicz, Maria; Lindley, Keith J.; Rutland, Paul; et al. (September 2000). "A recessive contiguous gene deletion causing infantile hyperinsulinism, enteropathy and deafness identifies the Usher type 1C gene". Nature Genetics. 26 (1): 56–60. doi:10.1038/79178. PMID 10973248. S2CID 2237489.
- Cornblath, M.; Hawdon, J. M.; Williams, A. F.; Aynsley-Green, A.; Ward-Platt, M. P.; Schwartz, R.; Kalhan, S. C. (1 May 2000). "Controversies Regarding Definition of Neonatal Hypoglycemia: Suggested Operational Thresholds". Pediatrics. 105 (5): 1141–1145. doi:10.1542/peds.105.5.1141. PMID 10790476.
- Dunne, Mark J.; Cosgrove, Karen E.; Shepherd, Ruth M.; Aynsley-Green, Albert; Lindley, Keith J. (January 2004). "Hyperinsulinism in Infancy: From Basic Science to Clinical Disease". Physiological Reviews. 84 (1): 239–275. doi:10.1152/physrev.00022.2003. PMID 14715916. S2CID 2538093.
- Bitner-Glindzicz, Maria; Lindley, Keith J.; Rutland, Paul; Blaydon, Diana; Smith, Virpi V.; Milla, Peter J.; Hussain, Khalid; Furth-Lavi, Judith; Cosgrove, Karen E.; Shepherd, Ruth M.; Barnes, Philippa D.; O'Brien, Rachel E.; Farndon, Peter A.; Sowden, Jane; Liu, Xue-Zhong; Scanlan, Matthew J.; Malcolm, Sue; Dunne, Mark J.; Aynsley-Green, Albert; Glaser, Benjamin (September 2000). "A recessive contiguous gene deletion causing infantile hyperinsulinism, enteropathy and deafness identifies the Usher type 1C gene". Nature Genetics. 26 (1): 56–60. doi:10.1038/79178. PMID 10973248. S2CID 2237489.
- Clayton, Peter T.; Eaton, Simon; Aynsley-Green, Albert; Edginton, Mark; Hussain, Khalid; Krywawych, Steve; Datta, Vipan; Malingré, Helga E.M.; Berger, Ruud; van den Berg, Inge E.T. (1 August 2001). "Hyperinsulinism in short-chain L-3-hydroxyacyl-CoA dehydrogenase deficiency reveals the importance of β-oxidation in insulin secretion". Journal of Clinical Investigation. 108 (3): 457–465. doi:10.1172/jci200111294. PMC 209352. PMID 11489939.
- Dunne, Mark J.; Kane, Charlotte; Shepherd, Ruth M.; Sanchez, Jorge A.; James, Roger F.L.; Johnson, Paul R.V.; Aynsley-Green, Albert; Lu, Shan; Clement, John P.; Lindley, Keith J.; Seino, Susumu; Aguilar-Bryan, Lydia; Gonzalez, Gabriela; Milla, Peter J. (6 March 1997). "Familial Persistent Hyperinsulinemic Hypoglycemia of Infancy and Mutations in the Sulfonylurea Receptor". New England Journal of Medicine. 336 (10): 703–706. doi:10.1056/NEJM199703063361005. hdl:2381/35991. PMID 9041101.
- Cornblath, Marvin; Schwartz, Robert; Aynsley-Green, Albert; Lloyd, June K. (May 1990). "Hypoglycemia in Infancy: The Need for a Rational Definition". Pediatrics. 85 (5): 834–837. doi:10.1542/peds.85.5.834. ISSN 0031-4005. S2CID 7172574.

The following are books that Aynsley-Green wrote or co-wrote:

- Gregory, John W; Aynsley-Green, Albert (1993). Hypoglycaemia. Baillière's clinical endocrinology and metabolism, volume 7, number 3 (Illustrations ed.). London: Bailliere. pp. 551–783.
- Aynsley-Green, Albert (1995). Stress and pain in infancy and childhood. London: Baillère Tindall. ISBN 9780702020094.
- Aynsley-Green, Albert; Soltész, Gyula (1985). Hypoglycaemia in infancy and childhood. Edinburgh: Churchill Livingstone. ISBN 9780443031847.
- Aynsley-Green, A (1997). Unintentional injury in childhood and adolescence. Baillière's clinical paediatrics : international practice and research volume 5 number 3. London: Baillière, Tindall. ISBN 9780702023194.
- Aynsley-Green, A (2003). Do ye hear the children weeping, o my brothers, ere the sorrow comes with years?. London: Great Ormond Street Hospital for Children NHS Trust.
- Aynsley-Green, Al (2003). The Harrison Research Centre at the Children's Trust : inaugural lecture : 'Do you hear the children weeping, o my brothers!'. Tadworth. OCLC 957168274.
- Kane, Charlotte; Shepherd, Ruth M.; Squires, Paul E.; Johnson, Paul R.V.; James, Roger F.L.; Milla, Peter J.; Aynsley-Green, Albert; Lindley, Keith J.; Dunne, Mark J. (1 December 1996). "Loss of functional KATP channels in pancreatic β–cells causes persistent hyperinsulinemic hypoglycemia of infancy". Nature Medicine. 2 (12): 1344–1347. doi:10.1038/nm1296-1344. PMID 8946833. S2CID 24420395.
- Aynsley-Green, A (2019). The British Betrayal of Childhood Challenging Uncomfortable Truths and Bringing about Change (1 ed.). New York: Routledge. ISBN 9781138297920.
- Birch-Machin, Mark A; Aynsley-Green, Albert; Welch, Robert J; Milligan, David W A; Darley-Usmar, Victor M; Bartlett, Kim; Sherratt, H Stanley A; Watmough, Nicholas J; Turnbull, Douglass M (1989). "Fatal Lactic Acidosis in Infancy with a Defect of Complex III of the Respiratory Chain". Pediatric Research. 25 (5): 553–559. doi:10.1203/00006450-198905000-00025. PMID 2541396.

The following are proceedings that Aynsley-Green wrote or co-wrote:

- Aynsley-Green, Albert (1984). Paediatric endocrinology in clinical practice : proceedings of the Royal College of Physicians' Paediatric Endocrinology Conference 20-21 October 1983 (Conference publication ed.). London: Lancaster, MTP Press. ISBN 9780852008645.
- Aynsley-Green, Albert; Kelnar, Christopher J H (1995). 34th Annual Meeting of the European Society for Paediatric [i.e. Pediatric] Endocrinology (ESPE) : abstracts : Edinburgh, June 25-28, 1995 (European Society for Pediatric Endocrinology. Annual Meeting ed.). Basel: Karger. ISBN 9783805561747.
