= Frederick Gough School =

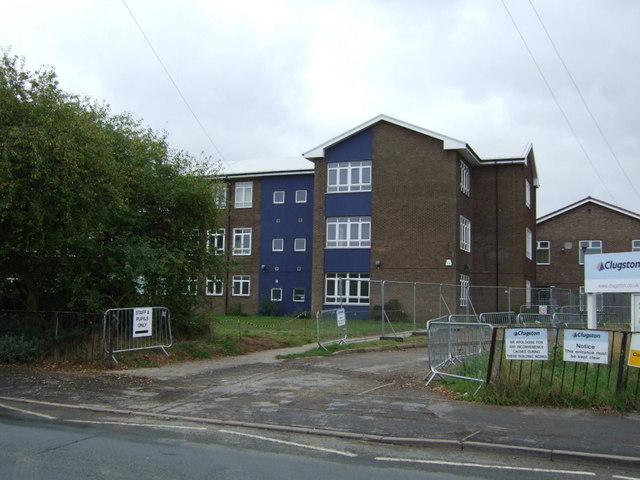
- Building work in September 2014

Location
- Grange Lane South; Scunthorpe, Lincolnshire, DN16 3NG; England; 53.56175°N 0.63725°W

Information
- Type: Community school
- Motto: Servire est vivere
- Established: September 1960
- Local authority: North Lincolnshire
- Department for Education URN: 118097 Tables
- Ofsted: Reports
- Head teacher: Ben Lawrance
- Gender: Co-educational
- Age: 11 to 16
- Houses: Harrison; Newton; Tennyson; Wesley
- Website: http://www.frederickgoughschool.co.uk

Frederick Gough School is a community secondary school in Scunthorpe, England, for approximately 1,300 pupils aged from 11 to 16.

== History ==
=== Grammar school ===
For two years, before it opened, the selected group of 110 were taught at Riddings Secondary School. The Ashby Grammar School (AGS) school badge was designed by the Art mistress, Miss M Balmford, in navy and light blue, with a Knights Templar motif; the Knights Templars was connected to Bottesford, Lincolnshire. It would cost £186,000 in 1958. Lindsey Education Committee wanted to call it Bottesford Grammar School, and the Scunthorpe education divisional body wanted to call it Queen's Grammar School, there would be 17 teachers, and construction would be finished by June 1960. There would be about 350, on the roll, from ages 11–14, with laboratories for physics, chemistry and biology. A sixth form would be in place by 1962. The school was built by R M Phillips & Sons of Brigg, with bricks from Crowle Works. The headteacher was 41 year old Mr John Tookey, the former deputy head, and head of English, of John Leggott Grammar School. The grammar school opened on Tuesday 6 September 1960, and would cost £273,000.

The grammar school was renamed Frederick Gough Grammar School after Alderman Frederick Gough, the first Chairman of Governors of the school. In November 1960, it was decided to rename the school, as Mr Gough had recently died. Frederick Herbert Baker Gough died aged 77 on Wednesday 5 October 1960 in Scunthorpe War Memorial Hospital. He came from Cardiff, and before the war he had been chief engineer of the Normanby Park steel works. He had been awarded the OBE in the 1943 Birthday Honours. His funeral was on Saturday 8 October 1960 at Ashby Wesley Church, later being buried in Bottesford churchyard. Hubert Gough, his son, died in January 1990 in Cumbria.

Sir Charles Morris, vice-chancellor of University of Leeds since 1948, was chosen to open the new school in early 1961. It was officially opened Thursday 2 March 1961.

It worked with the John Leggott Grammar School; both offered Russian.

In December 1964, 16 year old Trevor Kitson, born 27 February 1948, of Belton Road in Epworth, was offered a place to study chemistry at St Peter's College, Oxford. He was the first at the school to go to such a university. In September 1962 he had passed seven O-levels, aged 14. Trevor moved to Palmerston North in the early 1970s, to lecture at Massey University.

=== Comprehensive ===
It became a comprehensive school in 1968 following the introduction of the Comprehensive School system by the Labour Government in 1965. The first intake of pupils in the new system started in September 1968 and were split with half (co-ed) attending the Frederick Gough School and half (co-ed) going to the Ashby Girls Secondary School.

== Headteachers ==
- 1960 John Geoffrey Tookey, he lived at 24 Brandon Road, with daughters Catherine and Alison; when deputy headmaster of the John Leggott Grammar School, he had a road accident on 30 December 1958, when with his sister, Margaret Plummer of Walsall, which killed his elder daughter Catherine (born 1945), when a British Road Services truck mounted a pavement on Upper Oungate in Tamworth in Staffordshire; Catherine had attended Scunthorpe Grammar School; Alison married in 1973 he questioned the comprehensive system; from 1967, he was the first headmaster of Bramhall County Grammar School, leaving in 1979 as deputy head of the Bramhall High School; he was born in 1918, and attended Wednesbury Boys' High School, studied English at Downing College, Cambridge, and served in the Royal Artillery from 1940 to 1945; he died on 11 February 2010 in Bramhall
- 1966 Mr Peter H Withington, he died on Friday 2 December 1977, aged 54, at 5 West Common Gardens, having been seriously ill for many weeks
- September 1978 Brian Timms, aged 41, the former deputy headmaster of Baysgarth School, lived in Goxhill, originally from Portsmouth
- David Kemp ( starting month not publicly noted down) 1989 - September 1996
- Geoff Turner September 1996 - August 2005,
- The current headteacher is called Ben Lawrence September 1, 2005 - (still in charge as of 2026).

== Curriculum ==
Frederick Gough school has been known as a "Specialist Languages College and students originally studied French with a choice of German and Russian Nowadays, The school teaches French (higher set only, excluding GCSE option) and Spanish.

In 2014 the school benefited from BSF (Building Schools for the Future), a programme introduced by the Labour government. From this it received new toilets, a 3G Sports Pitch, a new sports block and hall and a new English block.

== Notable former pupils ==
- Sir Peter Birkett
- Levi Sutton
