= Denbigh High School, Luton =

Denbigh High School

Location
- Alexandra Avenue; Luton, Bedfordshire, LU3 1HE; England; 51°53′29″N 0°25′31″W

Information
- Type: Academy
- Motto: High achievement for all is our shared responsibility.
- Specialist: Sports College
- Department for Education URN: 136319 Tables
- Ofsted: Reports
- Acting Headteacher: Donna Neely-Hayes
- Gender: Coeducational
- Age: 11 to 16
- Enrolment: 1127
- Website: www.denbighhigh.co.uk

Denbigh High School is an academy school in Luton, Bedfordshire, England. Colin Townsend was Headteacher, following Dame Yasmin Bevan's retirement as Executive Principal and Headteacher at the end of 2014. Donna Neely-Hayes as acting Headteacher, followed Townsend's departure to University of Birmingham School in late 2018.

== Admissions ==
The school has approximately 1120 students between the ages of 11 and 16 and the school became an academy in 1911. Its partner school, Challney High School for Boys (also within Luton) became a National Teaching School in July 2011 and Denbigh High School is their strategic partner. As their partner and a lead member of the Challenge Partnership Denbigh High School plays a significant role in the training and professional development of teachers, support staff and headteachers from across the UK.

Denbigh High School is also an NCSL Leadership Development School and through this work it helps to develop future leaders. Before becoming an academy, the school was designated a specialist sports college in 2005, and with this came a major upgrade to many of the school's facilities including a new sports hall, dance studio and artificial turf football pitch. Denbigh High School has a wide range of sporting facilities which are also open to the local community in the evening and at weekends.

Denbigh High School won the 'TES Secondary School of the Year Award' in 2009 and became an academy in 2010 as well as becoming a strategic partner of Chiltern Teaching School Alliance, with Challney High School for Boys.

In 2013, Denbigh High School became part of The Chiltern Learning Trust which is a multi-academy trust comprising Denbigh High School, Challney High School for Boys and Dallow Primary School. The Trust is led by a board of trustees which consists of representatives from all three schools with Adrian Rogers as Chief Executive. Each school also has its own local governing body.

Denbigh High is to not be confused with the Denbigh High School, in Wales.

== History ==
=== Former school ===
The school was Luton High School, a girls' grammar school.

=== Second World War ===
North London Collegiate School was evacuated to Luton High School in September 1939.

== Demographics ==
As of circa 2012, 76% of Denbigh students identified as being Bangladeshi British and/or Pakistani British, and 79% of the students were Muslim.

== Academic performance ==
Circa 2012 Anastasia Vakulenko, the author of Islamic Veiling in Legal Discourse, wrote that Denbigh High "was considered to be a multicultural success story, as it had transformed from an underachieving school into one of the best in the region within years."

== Dress code ==
Denbigh High consulted mosques in developing its uniform policy. Girls who are Muslim, Sikh, and Hindu may wear salwar kameez, and since 1993 the school has permitted girls to wear Islamic headscarves (hijab) after it received requests to do so. The salwar kameez at Denbigh High is worn with elements of traditional British school uniforms. Vakulenko wrote that the press and judges had praised the uniform policy, believing it to be "inclusive" and "thoughtful", and that the policy "was believed to satisfy most pupils and their parents".

There was a lawsuit over "excluding" a student (whether or not exclusion, as defined by educational guidelines, had occurred was a matter of debate in the House of Lords' decisions), Shabina Begum, who refused to wear the school uniform, instead opting for jilbab, an Islamic dress that is different from the salwar kameez. The House of Lords eventually ruled in the school's favour.
