= Youth justice in England and Wales =

Rules and institutions of criminal law in England and Wales applicable to young people

In England and Wales, criminal law is delivered through two distinct systems: the adult and youth justice systems. The youth justice system was set up to prevent and control crime, anti-social behaviour and offences carried out by individuals under the age of 17 (with some exceptions extending to 18). It is overseen by the Youth Justice Board, which is an executive public body funded by the Ministry of Justice and set up under the Crime and Disorder Act 1998. Its purposes are set out in section 41 of that Act.

The youth justice system of England and Wales is regulated by the Crime and Disorder Act 1998 and the Youth Justice and Criminal Evidence Act 1999, and is separate from the one in Northern Ireland and Scotland. In Northern Ireland, the youth justice system is regulated by the Justice Northern Ireland Act 2002. In Scotland, it is regulated by the Criminal Justice (Scotland) Act 2016 .

== Criminal law ==
=== Age of criminal responsibility ===
Children under the age of 10 are irrefutably presumed to be incapable of committing an offence. Prior to 1998, a child aged between 10 and 13 was presumed under doli incapax to be incapable of committing an offence unless the prosecution were able to prove that the child knew the difference between right and wrong, although a range of mitigating factors particular to childhood are normally taken into account in England and Wales. Now, children aged between 10 and 17 are capable of committing offences and it is not possible for a child to avoid liability by showing that they do not know the difference between right and wrong. However, a child should not be found guilty if they are unfit to plead.

In exceptional circumstances, most notably the case of the murder of James Bulger in Liverpool in 1993, children can be tried as an adult in an adult court.

From the age of 18 onwards, individuals are then considered an adult in the eyes of the law. Therefore, all punishment given by the courts or other law enforcement agencies will rest solely upon them.

== Criminal procedure before trial ==
=== Arrest ===
After a person aged 10 to 17 has been arrested and taken to a police station, the Police and Criminal Evidence Act 1984 requires that the custody officer ascertain the identity of a parent, guardian, Local Authority carer or any other person who has assumed responsibility for the juvenile's welfare and must inform them of the arrest. The custody officer should inform the appropriate adult (who may or may not be the same person) of the grounds for the detainee's detention and ask the adult to come to the police station to see the detainee. The juvenile should be told of the duties of the appropriate adult and that the juvenile can consult privately with the appropriate adult at any time, but warned that such conversations are not privileged.

The young person may not ordinarily be interviewed, be asked to provide or sign a written statement under caution, be asked to sign a record of interview without an appropriate adult being present. A superintendent may authorise an interview without an appropriate adult if:

- he is satisfied the interview would not significantly harm the person's physical or mental state; and
- delay would be likely to either
  - lead to interference with, or harm to, evidence connected with an offence,
  - lead to interference with, or physical harm to, other people,
  - lead to serious loss of, or damage to, property,
  - lead to alerting other people suspected of committing an offence but not yet arrested for it, or
  - hinder the recovery of property obtained in consequence of the commission of the offence.

During an interview where an appropriate adult is present, an appropriate adult should:

- advise the person being interviewed;
- observe whether the interview is being conducted properly and fairly; and
- facilitate communication with the person being interviewed.

=== Prosecution, reprimands and final warnings ===
The Crown Prosecution service has produced detailed guidance on prosecuting juveniles.

A police officer may proceed by way of reprimand or (final) warning, where the following conditions are satisfied:

- a constable has evidence that a child or young person ( "the offender") has committed an offence;
- the constable considers that the evidence is such that, if the offender were prosecuted for the offence, there would be a realistic prospect of his being convicted;
- the offender admits to the constable that he committed the offence;
- the offender has not previously been convicted of an offence; and
- the constable is satisfied that it would not be in the public interest for the offender to be prosecuted.

A police officer can either give the offender a reprimand or a final warning. A final warning is more serious. Once a person has received one reprimand he cannot receive a second. A person may be given a final warning without a reprimand if the seriousness of the offence warrants this course. A person may exceptionally be given a second (but not a third) final warning if "the offence was committed more than two years after the date of the previous warning and the constable considers the offence to be not so serious as to require a charge to be brought".

In the case of a juvenile under the age of 17, the reprimand or final warning should be given in the presence of an appropriate adult. Where a police officer gives a final warning, he should refer the offender to the local youth offending team who should arrange for him to participate in a rehabilitation programme unless they consider it inappropriate to do so.

The system of reprimand and final warning was replaced in 2013 by youth cautions and youth conditional cautions by the Legal Aid, Sentencing and Punishment of Offenders Act 2012.

=== First appearance ===
Having been formally accused of committing an offence, a juvenile will make his first appearance in the Youth Court unless:

- the juvenile is jointly charged with an adult;
- the juvenile is charged with aiding and abetting an adult (or vice versa);
- the juvenile is charged with an offence arising from the same circumstances as those in which an adult is accused of committing an offence.

=== Bail ===
A juvenile has a general right to bail.

As for adults, the main reasons for refusing bail are that the defendant is accused of an imprisonable offence and there are substantial grounds for believing that the defendant:

1. will abscond;
2. will commit further offences whilst on bail; or
3. will interfere with witnesses or otherwise obstruct the course of justice whether in relation to himself or any other person.

The court may also refuse bail for the juvenile's own protection or welfare or for a limited number of other reasons.

A juvenile's parent may be asked to act as a surety for up to £50 for the juvenile's attendance at court and compliance with any conditions attached to bail.

=== Detention in custody ===
Where a juvenile is refused bail, he is normally remanded in local authority accommodation. He may be remanded in secure accommodation only if:

- the juvenile is over 10 years old; and
- either
  - he is charged with or has been convicted of a violent or sexual offence, or an offence punishable in the case of an adult with imprisonment for a term of fourteen years or more, or
  - taken together, the offences of which he has been convicted and with which he has been charged amount to a recent history of repeatedly committing imprisonable offences while remanded on bail or to local authority accommodation.

== Trial ==
=== Place of trial ===
A juvenile will ordinarily be tried in the Youth Court. A juvenile may be tried in an adult Magistrates' Court only if he is charged alongside an adult.

A juvenile will be tried in the Crown Court where:

Offence	Discretion	Court
Homicide offences	must	Crown Court
Firearms offences where the mandatory minimum term applies	must	Crown Court
Grave crimes: offences carrying terms exceeding 14 years for adults; sexual assault; child sex offences	may: The court should consider representations only and not evidence.; The defendant has no right to elect Crown Court trial.; There must be a real possibility that the claimant could be sentenced to a custodial term in excess of two years.; The decision may be challenged by judicial review.	Crown Court
Specified offence punishable in the case of an adult by life or more than 10 years imprisonment	must if the court considers there is a significant risk to members of the public of serious harm occasioned by the commission by the offender of further specified offences	Crown Court
Tried alongside adult	Adult is to be tried in the Crown Court: if it is necessary in the interests of justice that they both be tried in the Crown Court	Crown Court
Tried alongside adult	Adult is to be tried in the Magistrates' Court	Adult Magistrates' Court

=== Trial in a youth court ===
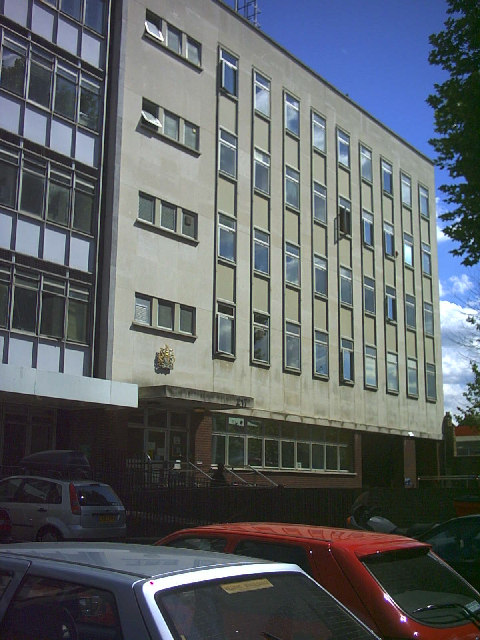
Balham Youth Court

A youth court is a magistrates' court but a youth court has jurisdiction to try juveniles where a magistrates' court does not have a similar power to try adults. The magistrates and district judges who sit in a youth court will receive specialist training on dealing with young people. A youth court is presided over by either a district judge or a bench of two or three lay magistrates, which previously must (unless there are unforeseen circumstances) have included both a man and a woman, though this requirement has since been repealed.

A youth court is not open to the public. The victims of the crime, however, have the opportunity to attend the hearings of the court if they want to, but they must make a request to the court if they wish to do so. The needs and wishes of victims will always be considered by the court and, through the youth offending team (YOT), they often have the opportunity to have an input into the sentencing process. The only other persons who may be present are:

- members and officers of the court;
- parties to the case before the court, their solicitors and counsel, and witnesses and other persons directly concerned in that case (e.g. probation officers and social workers);
- parents or guardians;
- bonâ fide representatives of newspapers or news agencies;
- such other persons as the court may specially authorise to be present.

The following reporting restrictions apply automatically:

- no report shall be published which reveals the name, address or school of any child or young person concerned in the proceedings or includes any particulars likely to lead to the identification of any child or young person concerned in the proceedings; and
- no picture shall be published in any newspaper as being or including a picture of any child or young person so concerned in the proceedings as aforesaid.

The restrictions may be lifted by the court:

- for the purpose of avoiding injustice to the child or young person or
- as respects a child or young person, who is charged with or has been convicted or a violent offence, a sexual offence, or an offence punishable in the case of a person aged 21 or over with imprisonment for fourteen years or more and is unlawfully at large, it is necessary to dispense with those requirements for the purpose of apprehending him and bringing him before a court or returning him to the place in which he was in custody or
- in respect of a child who has been convicted of an offence, in the public interest.

Where a child is under 16, the court must (unless it would be unreasonable) require a parent or guardian to attend court and where the child is aged 16 to 18, the court may do so.

Due to funding cuts through austerity cases take much longer to be dealt with, children appear in court without legal representation and without an appropriate adult to support them. Reoffending by youngsters has increased and money that could go into programmes to discourage reoffending has been banked. Anne Longfield claimed the English and Welsh youth justice system is "chaotic and dysfunctional" after nearly a decade of court closures and cuts. Longfield urged a largescale review of youth justice, stating the youth court was "not a child-friendly environment where you could really help a young person and is not meeting standards that we had hoped". Cases that involve children take nearly 40% longer than they did in 2010. Reoffending by children has increased with 40.9% of children reoffending in 2017 after being convicted of cautioned. Children who got a youth caution or sentence who were black, Asian or minority ethnic have proportionately nearly doubled from 14% in 2010 to 27% in 2018. Children are handcuffed while being taken to court and locked in secure docks when they are charged with minor offences, though courts are told to put only the most dangerous children in the dock. Some children face court without legal representation or support from an appropriate adult (parent or social worker) to support. Because many youth courts have closed gang members are sometimes put in the same waiting room as rival gangs from other areas and this can lead to violence. Defendants are afraid to attend court or are attacked on arrival. Thousands of children are left not knowing what is happening for months or even years after being released under investigation (no longer an option since 2022 as defendants now have a right to bail when released). In 2018–2019 in Greater Manchester police took no decisions over 100 rapes and one murder with child suspects, leaving accused children and their alleged victims uncertain.

=== Trial in the Crown Court ===
Generally, the same procedures apply in the Crown Court for juveniles as for adults.

There is no automatic restriction on reporting proceedings, unlike in the Youth Court, but the court may direct that:

- no newspaper report of the proceedings shall reveal the name, address or school, or include any particulars calculated to lead to the identification, of any child or young person concerned in the proceedings, either as being the person by or against or in respect of whom the proceedings are taken, or as being a witness therein; and/or
- no picture shall be published in any newspaper as being or including a picture of any child or young person so concerned in the proceedings as aforesaid.

Where a child is under 14, the court must (unless it would be unreasonable) require a parent or guardian to attend court and where the child is aged 14 to 18, the court may do so.

Paragraph II.30 of the Consolidated Criminal Practice Direction makes provision for the adapting the procedures in the Crown Court where a juvenile is tried, to assist in their taking part in the trial.

A defendant under the age of 18 may give evidence by live link if:

- it would be in the interests of justice to do so
- the defendant's ability to participate effectively as a witness is compromised by his level of intelligence or social functioning and that his ability to participate effectively would be improved by giving evidence via a live link.

== Sentencing ==
=== Court powers ===
The courts have the powers to pass the following sentences:

	Youth Court	Adult Magistrates Court	Crown Court
Sentence of detention			if the court is of the opinion that none of the other methods in which the case may legally be dealt with is suitable
detention and training orders	yes		yes
fine	up to £1000, or up to £250 if under 14		unlimited
youth community orders (if aged 17 or under)	yes		yes
reparation orders	yes		yes
referral order	yes		exercising the power to act as a district judge
absolute and conditional discharges	yes	yes	yes
binding over the juvenile's parents		yes	
ancillary orders	yes	yes	yes

=== Court process ===
==== Youth Court process ====
The local authority, if notified of proceedings and unless they consider it unnecessary to do so, should make such investigations and should provide the court with information relating to the home surroundings, school, record, health and character of the defendant and any other matters required by the court. The Criminal Procedure Rules state:

1. the relevant minor and his parent or guardian, if present, shall be given an opportunity of making a statement;
2. the court shall take into consideration all available information as to the general conduct, home surroundings, school record and medical history of the relevant minor and, in particular, shall take into consideration such information as aforesaid which is provided in pursuance of section 9 of the Children and Young Persons Act 1969 ( (1));
3. if such information as aforesaid is not fully available, the court shall consider the desirability of adjourning the proceedings for such inquiry as may be necessary;
4. any written report of a probation officer, local authority, local education authority, educational establishment or registered medical practitioner may be received and considered by the court without being read aloud; and
5. if the court considers it necessary in the interests of the relevant minor, it may require him/her or his/her parent or guardian, if present, to withdraw from the court.

==== Crown Court process ====
Except in homicide cases, the Crown Court shall unless satisfied that it would be undesirable to do so, remit the case to the youth court.

=== Specific sentences ===
==== Sentences of detention ====
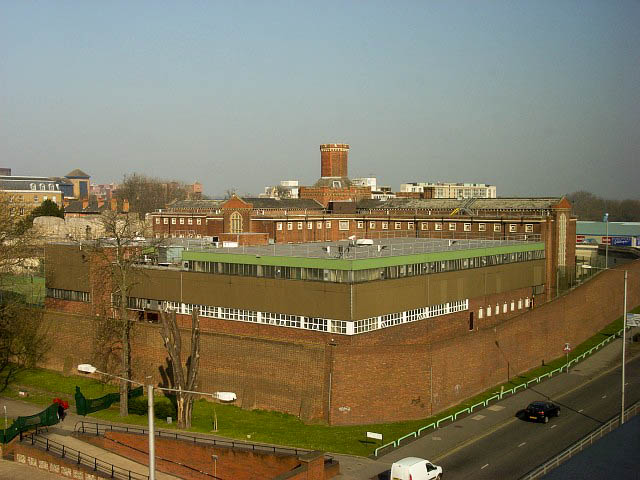
His Majesty's Prison and Young Offenders Institution Reading

No custodial sentence may be passed on an offender aged under 21 who is not legally represented at least at some point after he is found guilty and before sentence (unless he was granted a right to representation funded by legal aid but the right was withdrawn because of his conduct; or having been informed of his right to apply for such representation and having had the opportunity to do so, he refused or failed to apply).

Offenders aged under 21 cannot be sentenced to prison for any reason, but may be remanded in custody in prison for trial or sentence.

The relevant date for determining the court's powers to sentence is the date of the conviction but the court should take as the starting point the sentence that the defendant would have been likely to receive if he had been sentenced at the date of the commission of the offence.

Offenders aged under 18	Offenders aged 18–21
s. 100. The Secretary of State may appoint a date at which the orders may be applied to offenders under 12. A court may sentence a person under 15 with a detention and training order only if it is of the opinion he is a persistent offender. In respect of other summary-only offences, the term of an order may be 4 or 6 months. In respect of indictable offences, the term of such an order may be 4, 6, 8, 10, 12, 18 or 24 months. In either case, the term must not exceed the maximum time that an adult could be imprisoned for the same offence. The court may not order terms between those set out in the statute (e.g. 20 months) and the court must pass the shorter available term if it would otherwise be minded to pass an intermediate term. Consecutive terms lawfully passed may add-up to an intermediate term. Ordinarily a detainee will be released after having served half of his term and supervised for the remainder of the term. If an order breaches a requirement of supervision, he may be returned to the detention for the remainder of his term (or three months if shorter) or fined up to £1000. If a person commits another offence during supervision, he may be returned to the detention for the remainder of his term. Detention under Powers of Criminal Courts (Sentencing) Act 2000, s. 91. Where a person aged under 18 is convicted in the Crown Court of one of a limited number of serious offences, and the court is of the opinion that none of the other methods in which the case may legally be dealt with is suitable, the court may sentence the offender to be detained for such period, not exceeding the maximum term of imprisonment with which the offence is punishable in the case of a person aged 21 or over (including life). The offences are: sexual assault; child sex offences committed by children; sexual activity with a child family member; inciting a child family member to engage in sexual activity; prohibited firearms offences (if the offender was over 16 at the time he committed the offence).	Young offenders institutions. A person aged 18–21 may be sentenced to detention in a young offender institution, for a term of between 21 days and the maximum prison term applicable to an adult convicted of the same offence. It is normal practice to sentence young offenders for shorter terms than adults. In the Crown Court sentences of between 14 days and 12 months in the Magistrates' Court sentences of between 14 days and 6 months may be suspended. Custody for life. Exceptionally, a person aged 18–21 may be sentenced by the Crown Court to custody for life where a person aged 21 or over would be liable to imprisonment for life.
Detention at His Majesty's pleasure. Where a person aged under 18 is convicted of murder, he must be sentenced to detention at His Majesty's pleasure.

==== Community sentences ====
If a court considers the offences serious enough to warrant a community sentence, and that a community sentence or combination thereof would be most suitable to the offender and commensurate with the seriousness of the offence, it may pass a community sentence in accordance with the following table:

Offenders aged under 16 Youth community order	Offenders aged 16 or 17 Community sentence
	Community rehabilitation order 6 months - 3 years supervision. Normally a pre-sentence report is required if an attendance, activity, community rehabilitation centre, mental treatment, drug or alcohol treatment, curfew or exclusion requirement is added.
	Community punishment order 40 – 240 hours. Normally a pre-sentence report is required.
	Community punishment and rehabilitation order 40 – 100 hours punishment. 12 months - 3 years supervision. Normally a pre-sentence report is required.
	Drug treatment and testing order Normally a pre-sentence report is required. The court must be satisfied (having ordered samples if necessary) that the offender is dependent on or has a propensity to misuse drugs and that his dependency or propensity is such as requires and may be susceptible to treatment.
Supervision order Up to 3 years. Normally a pre-sentence report is required if a requirement to comply with directions, a requirement as to activities, reparation, or night restrictions, a requirement to live for specified period in local authority accommodation, a requirement as to treatment for mental condition, or a requirement as to education is added.	Supervision order Up to 3 years. Normally a pre-sentence report is required if a requirement to comply with directions, a requirement as to activities, reparation, or night restrictions, a requirement to live for specified period in local authority accommodation, a requirement as to treatment for mental condition, or a requirement as to education is added.
Curfew order 2–12 hours in any one day Maximum 6 months duration	Curfew order 2–12 hours in any one day Maximum 6 months duration
Exclusion order	Exclusion order
Attendance centre order	Attendance centre order
Action plan order 3 month action plan. A written report made by a local probation board officer is required.	Action plan order 3 month action plan. A written report made by a local probation board officer is required.

Where a court should normally obtain a pre-sentence report, it may dispense with this requirement if it considers it unnecessary to do so. In respect of offenders under 18, it may only dispense with the report if a current offence is triable on indictment or the court has had reference to the most recent previous pre-sentence report for the offender.

==== Referral orders ====
Under certain circumstances, a Youth Court (or other Magistrates Court) must or may make a referral to a local youth offender panel. The panel should seek to agree a "contract", a programme of behaviour, with the young offender. If a contract cannot be agreed, the young offender panel refers the offender back to the court. The length of the programme is determined by the court when making the reference and must be between three months and one year. Section 23 of the Powers of Criminal Courts (Sentencing) Act 2000 makes the following provision about the contents of the contract:

(2) The terms of the programme may, in particular, include provision for any of the following—

(a) the offender to make financial or other reparation to any person who appears to the panel to be a victim of, or otherwise affected by, the offence, or any of the offences, for which the offender was referred to the panel;
(b) the offender to attend mediation sessions with any such victim or other person;
(c) the offender to carry out unpaid work or service in or for the community;
(d) the offender to be at home at times specified in or determined under the programme;
(e) attendance by the offender at a school or other educational establishment or at a place of work;
(f) the offender to participate in specified activities (such as those designed to address offending behaviour, those offering education or training or those assisting with the rehabilitation of persons dependent on, or having a propensity to misuse, alcohol or drugs);
(g) the offender to present himself to specified persons at times and places specified in or determined under the programme;
(h) the offender to stay away from specified places or persons (or both);
(i) enabling the offender's compliance with the programme to be supervised and recorded.

(3) The programme may not, however, provide— (a) for the electronic monitoring of the offender's whereabouts; or (b) for the offender to have imposed on him any physical restriction on his movements.

Referral orders will be considered only if:

- the offender is before a Youth Court or other Magistrates' Court;
- the offender is under 18;
- the offence was not murder;
- the court is not proposing to pass a sentence absolutely discharging the offender;
- referral orders are available in the area;
- the offender has never previously been convicted in the UK; and
- the offender has never been bound over to keep the peace in England and Wales or Northern Ireland.

If the above conditions are satisfied and the offender has pleaded guilty to all of the offences before the court and one of them is punishable by imprisonment, the court must make a referral order. If otherwise the above conditions are satisfied and the offender has pleaded guilty to at least one offence before the court and not-guilty to another (regardless of whether they are imprisonable), the court may make a referral order.

If a court has made a referral order, it may not at the same time:

- impose a community sentence on the offender;
- order him to pay a fine;
- make a reparation order in respect of him;
- discharge him conditionally;
- bind him over to keep the peace or to be of good behaviour;
- bind over a parent or guardian; or
- make a parenting order.

==== Reparation orders ====
Other than in respect of a conviction for murder, and having received a report indicating the type of work suitable and the attitude of the victim(s), the offender may be ordered by the court to make reparation by making reparation to certain persons or to the community at large, so long as this does not involve more than 24 hours work. A reparation order may not be made where a community sentence or custodial sentence is passed.
