= Children's Commissioner for England =

Non-departmental public body in England

Office of the Children's Commissioner for England
- Formation: 2005
- Type: Non-departmental public body
- Children's Commissioner for England: Rachel de Souza
- Parent organisation: Department for Education
- Website: https://www.childrenscommissioner.gov.uk

- Incumbent; Rachel de Souza since 2021
- Office of the Children's Commissioner for England
- Nominator: Secretary of State for Education
- Appointer: Department for Education
- Term length: 6 years
- Formation: 2005

The Office of the Children's Commissioner for England is a non-departmental public body in England responsible for promoting and protecting the rights of children as set out in the United Nations Convention on the Rights of the Child, as well as other human rights legislation, such as the Human Rights Act 1998. The Children's Commissioner was established under the Children Act 2004 to "represent the views and interests of children", and the office was further strengthened by the Children and Families Act 2014 providing a legal mandate to promote and protect the rights of children. According to the Commissioner's website, the role's purpose is to facilitate long-term improvements for all children, and in particular for the most vulnerable, and involves “being the eyes and ears of children within the system and the country as a whole", as well as acting with political independence from government, children's agencies and the voluntary and private sectors. The Children's Commissioner also has a duty to speak on behalf of all children in the United Kingdom on non-devolved issues, which include immigration, and youth justice in Wales.

Dame Rachel de Souza started her term as Children's Commissioner in March 2021.

== History ==
The post of Children's Commissioner for England was established by the Children Act 2004 with the intended purpose of becoming the independent voice of children and young people, thereby championing their interests and bringing their concerns to the national arena. More than 130 organisations campaigned for the establishment of a Children's Commissioner for England for 13 years. Professor Al Aynsley-Green was appointed England's first Children's Commissioner in March 2005.

== Jurisdiction and powers ==
=== Children's Commissioner ===
The Office of the Children's Commissioner is a national organisation led by the Children's Commissioner for England.

=== Powers ===
The commissioner has a legal duty to promote and protect the rights of all children in England with a particular focus on children and young people with difficulties or challenges in their lives, and in particular those living away from home, in or leaving care, or receiving social care services.

The Children's Commissioner states that they "will use our powers and independence to ensure that the views of children and young people are routinely asked for, listened to and acted upon and that outcomes for children improve over time". They say they will "do this, in partnership with others, by bringing children and young people into the heart of the decision-making process to increase understanding of their best interests".

The office has powers of data collection under section 2f of The Children's Act (2014) as well as powers of inspection over any institution where children may be housed. These powers were added to the office from the original 2004 act which established the Children's Commissioner's role. The Commissioner is independent of Government, children's agencies, the voluntary and private sector.

Unlike the Children's Commissioner for Scotland, Wales, and Northern Ireland, the Children's Commissioner for England cannot deal with individual cases but would conduct an investigation that affects the wider population. The relationship between the Commissioners in the UK is flexible and is left to the Commissioners to decide to work together to combat certain issues or whether to carry out the investigations independently.

There are times when the UK's four Commissioners come together to provide a stronger force for certain requests such as when the four united in making call for a national debate on fatherhood They also submitted a joint report to the UN Committee on the Rights of the Child. The Children's Commissioner should be influenced by the United Nations Convention on the Rights of the Child when determining what constitutes the interests of children and young people. In addition, consideration should be given to the five principles of The Children's Plan: Building Brighter Futures:

- Government does not raise children – parents do – so government needs to do more to support parents and families
- All children obtain the potential to succeed and should go as far as their talents can take them
- Children and young people need to get pleasure from their childhood in addition to becoming prepared for adult life
- Services need to be shaped by and responsive to children, young people and families, not designed around professional boundaries
- It is always better to prevent failure than tackle a crisis later

=== Recent cases ===
In 2010, following concerns over the welfare of children, the UK government held a consultation on ending child detention for immigration purposes. Maggie Atkinson, then the Children's Commissioner for England, commented: "There now needs to be an ongoing dialogue between the government, through UK Borders Agency (UKBA), and stakeholders with a concern for this area of policy. As a previous report from my office has stated, the starting point for any alternative to detention should be developing community-based alternatives to detention, which ensure that children's needs are met, and their rights not breached, during the process of removal."

== Legislation ==
=== Children Act 1989 ===
The Children Act 1989 covers some key issues such as parent and child relationships; public child care law dealing with services to prevent family breakdown and emphasise child protection; and support for children with disabilities. It aims to strike a better balance between the duty to protect children but also allow parents to challenge the upbringing of the child and it strengthens the relationship between local authorities and parents. Some key principles are that the child's welfare must be the paramount consideration and agencies have a duty to review the wishes and feelings of the child. The act also reinforces the role of local authorities to manage services.

The Children Act 1989 will affect most child agencies, specifically social service departments and courts. Other areas may include day care, education and health.

=== Children Act 2004 ===
The act compromises 6 parts and detailed the role of the Children's Commissioner and other children's services:

1. Children's Commissioner
2. Children's services in England
3. Children's services in Wales
4. Advisory and support services for family proceedings
5. Miscellaneous – child minding and day care
6. General

=== Children and Families Act 2014 ===
Part 6 of the Children and Families Act 2014 detailed changes to the Commissioner's role.

== Initiatives ==
Since 2008, the Children's Commissioner has run IMO, a primarily online web platform which aims to provide a voice for children in care and care experienced young people to share their stories with one another. IMO works with children in care councils around England to offer opportunities and experiences to support children's wellbeing and mental health.

== Criticism ==
=== James Bulger murder ===
Maggie Atkinson attracted controversy by describing the murder of James Bulger as "unpleasant", and commenting that his killers, Jon Venables and Robert Thompson, ought never to have been prosecuted, and that the age of criminal responsibility in England and Wales ought to be raised to twelve, from the age of ten.

=== United Nations Convention on the Rights of the Child ===
The UK implemented the United Nations Convention on the Rights of the Child post ratification in 1991. According to the United Nations Committee's concluding observations in 1995:

The Committee is concerned about the apparent insufficiency of measures taken to ensure the implementation of the general principles of the Convention, namely the provisions of its articles 2, 3, 6 and 12. In this connection, the Committee observes in particular that the principle of the best interests of the child appears not to be reflected in legislation in such areas as health, education and social security which have a bearing on the respect for the rights of the child.

— United Nations Committee on the Rights of the Child, First Concluding Observations

The Committee's concluding observations in 2002 were also highly critical and led to the Children and Young People's Unit taking on responsibility to co-ordinate the implementation of the Convention across the UK, but was subsequently disbanded in Autumn 2003.

In the hierarchy of treaty terminology, a State's undertaking to "ensure" a right denotes the highest possible obligation – requiring more than mere non-interference with a designated right and requiring the State to execute positive legislative administrative and legal measures as necessary, to make sure the specified right can be effectively exercised. The Convention therefore has the status of International Law, using the word "ensure" 32 times in the substantive body of provisions and is not derogated in any way.

Although a lynchpin of UNCRC provisions, the government strenuously resisted appointment of a Children's Commissioner on the basis that newly created agents were sufficient e.g. Minister for Children and Families and the Director of Children's Rights. After several tragedies and the murder of Victoria Climbié, the Laming report of January 2003 recommended creation of the post. Margaret Hodge, then the Children's Minister, won her battle to have five references to the word "rights" removed from the description of the role. She also altered the position from promoting and safeguarding the rights of children in England to promoting awareness of their views.

(The Children and Families Act 2014 has subsequently changed the primary function of the Commissioner from representing the views and interests of children and young people to promoting and protecting children's rights.)

When the Commissioner for England was appointed in 2005, the National Society for the Prevention of Cruelty to Children commented:

the England Children Commissioner office does not meet the European standards set out for all European Commissioners.... the NSPCC believes that the Commissioner's remit and responsibilities should be more closely tied to the UNCRC... which the Government ratified in 1991, granting all children a comprehensive set of economic, social, civil and political rights

— National Society for the Prevention of Cruelty to Children, Briefing

In June 2008, all four UK Children's Commissioners in the devolved administrations issued a joint report to the UN Committee, uniting in the call for incorporation of UNCRC into domestic legislation. The third set of concluding observations in Autumn 2008 will indicate whether there is a need for a Children's Commissioner with 'teeth and hobnailed boots' in England, to herald the 30th Anniversary of the International Year of the Child.

In 2015, the new Commissioner, Anne Longfield, was criticised for removing her Deputy, Sue Berelowitz, with an enhanced severance package, and then immediately hiring her back as a consultant. It transpired that this had taken place without securing the required approval from government ministers and was therefore an abuse of her powers. The arrangement was subsequently cancelled as a result of media attention and the organisation ordered to repay to HM Treasury £10,000 of misused public funds.

== List of commissioners ==
- Sir Albert Aynsley-Green (2005–2009)
- Maggie Atkinson (2009–2015)
- Anne Longfield (2015–2021)
- Dame Rachel de Souza (2021–present)

== See also ==
- Children's Commissioner for Wales
- Northern Ireland Commissioner for Children and Young People
- Scotland's Commissioner for Children and Young People
- Takeover Day
- Timeline of children's rights in the United Kingdom
