= Anne Longfield, Baroness Longfield =

British charity worker and public servant

The Right Honourable The Baroness Longfield CBE
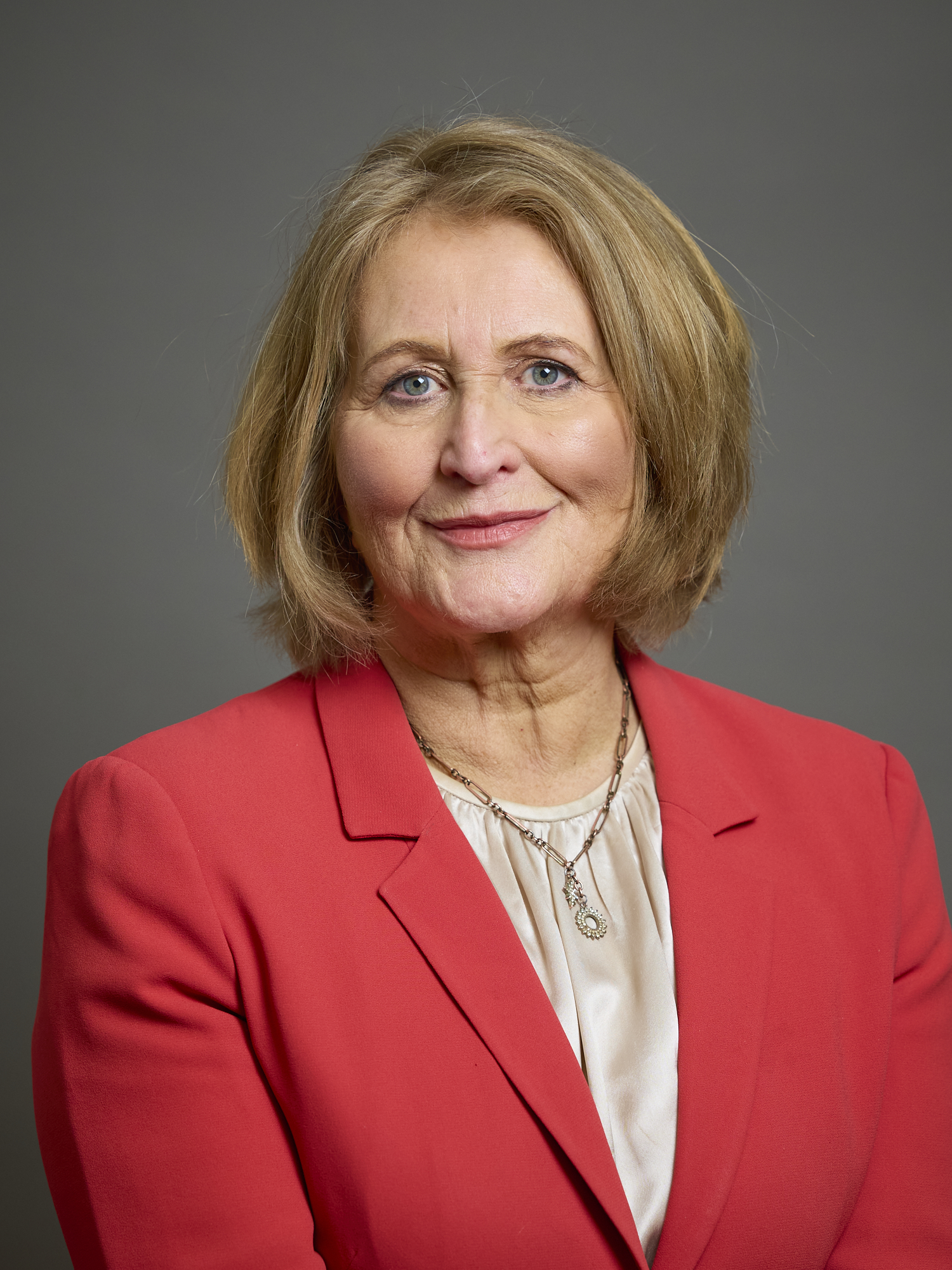
- Official portrait, 2025

Chair of the Independent Inquiry into Grooming Gangs
- Incumbent
- Assumed office 2025
- Appointed by: Shabana Mahmood (as Home Secretary)
- Preceded by: Office established

Children's Commissioner for England
- In office 2015–2021
- Preceded by: Maggie Atkinson
- Succeeded by: Rachel de Souza

Member of the House of Lords
- Lord Temporal
- Life peerage 31 January 2025

Personal details
- Born: 1960 (age 65–66)
- Party: Labour (2025)
- Spouse: Richard Reeve
- Children: 1
- Education: Prince Henry's Grammar School, Otley; Newcastle University

Anne Elizabeth Longfield, Baroness Longfield CBE (born 1960) is a Labour member of the House of Lords who formerly was the Children's Commissioner for England. She was formerly chief executive of the charity 4Children. She was appointed the Children's Commissioner for England in March 2015 and was succeeded at the end of February 2021 by Dame Rachel de Souza. In December 2025, she was appointed to chair a statutory inquiry into grooming gangs.

== Early life and career ==
Longfield was born to mother Jean, who was from a farming family, and father Vincent, an engineer who worked on Concorde. She grew up on a farm on The Chevin near Otley, West Yorkshire, and was educated at Prince Henry's Grammar School, Otley and Newcastle University, where she studied history.

Longfield started working in the children's sector in the 1980s as a researcher with Save the Children. She subsequently was Chief Executive of Kids Clubs Network. Prior to her appointment as Children's Commissioner, Longfield was Chief Executive of 4Children, a leading national children's charity, which delivered early years support, school support and youth services. She held this role for over 20 years. Whilst there she oversaw the rapid expansion of the charity – from employing six people to 1,500 members of staff – and left just before its financial collapse. During her time with 4Children, she worked with Labour minister Harriet Harman on developing Sure Start, and spent a year on secondment at the Prime Minister's Strategy Unit to assist with the programme's delivery.

== Children's Commissioner ==
Over her time in office the Longfield worked on issues affecting children's mental health, put forward proposals for giving children more power over their digital lives, published research on the experience of children in care, and launched a long-term study and data index on vulnerable children invisible to the state. Under these main areas of research she has made many public interventions, and published a large number of detailed reports exploring, explaining and advocating various solutions to specific aspects of these subjects. She has seen a number of them put into place by Government.

Longfield has made many appearances in print and on broadcast media, and has made representations to local and national Government. She has created a digital platform for Children in Care, IMO. Her helpline "Help at Hand", which aims to address problems raised by children in care, helps around a thousand children a year.

In 2020 her office responded to the coronavirus pandemic by producing materials to explain the virus and lockdown to children and highlighting the impact of the crisis on children - especially vulnerable children. She campaigned since May 2020 for all schools to be open in September, saying that, in any further restrictions to curb the spread of COVID-19, schools should be "last to close and first to re-open."

Longfield was appointed Officer of the Order of the British Empire (OBE) in 2000 and Commander of the Order of the British Empire (CBE) in the 2021 Birthday Honours for services to children.

=== Views ===
Longfield is concerned about what she sees as the effect of benefit cuts on vulnerable children in low income families. Longfield stated that universal credit and wider welfare reforms disproportionately affect single parents. Longfield stated, “There is a great risk here that the government looks like it’s going back to an outdated… viewpoint which is demonising both single parents but also families claiming benefit, and working mothers.”

She has argued for large digital platforms that are used by children to have greater responsibility and response to complaints from child users and has called for legislation in England to tackle perceived reluctance on such platforms to do so.

She has stated that waiting times and coverage of children's mental health services are too long, and insufficient for need.

She has called for review and overhaul of children's services across England and a much more "joined up approach" to providing services that prevent the need for greater intervention at a later stage in a child's life.

She believes there should be a register of children home educated in England.

She has called for greater co-ordination of police, the justice system, NHSE and children's services to tackle gang involvement, violent knife crime and the distribution of illegal drugs known as “county lines”. She has said that "No child should ever end up as a headline about gangland murder or organized exploitation simply because nobody in the system thought it was their job to keep them safe."

In 2017, Longfield welcomed the move to reschedule GCSE and A Level examinations to avoid clashing with the Muslim holy month of Ramadan.

=== Criticism ===
In 2015, shortly after starting her new role as children's Commissioner, Longfield was criticised for removing her Deputy, Sue Berelowitz, with an enhanced severance package, and then immediately hiring her back as a consultant. It transpired that this had taken place without securing the required approval from government ministers and was therefore an abuse of her powers. The arrangement was subsequently cancelled as a result of media attention and the organisation ordered her to repay to HM Treasury £10,000 of misused public funds.

== House of Lords ==
On 20 December 2024, it was announced that she was to be made a life peer as part of the 2024 Political Peerages. On 31 January 2025, she created Baroness Longfield, of Lower Wharfedale in the County of Yorkshire. She was introduced to the House of Lords on 25 February 2025, where she sits as a Labour Party peer. On 20 March 2025, she made her maiden speech during a debate on the Crown Court Criminal Case Backlog. Longfield called on the Department for Education to make anti-racism a key priority, saying that the need to promote racial inclusion is "too often" being overlooked in education.

In September 2025, Longfield endorsed Bridget Phillipson in the 2025 Labour Party deputy leadership election.
