= R v Headteacher and Governors of Denbigh High School, ex p Begum =

United Kingdom law case about restrictions on religious dress

R (Begum) v Denbigh High School
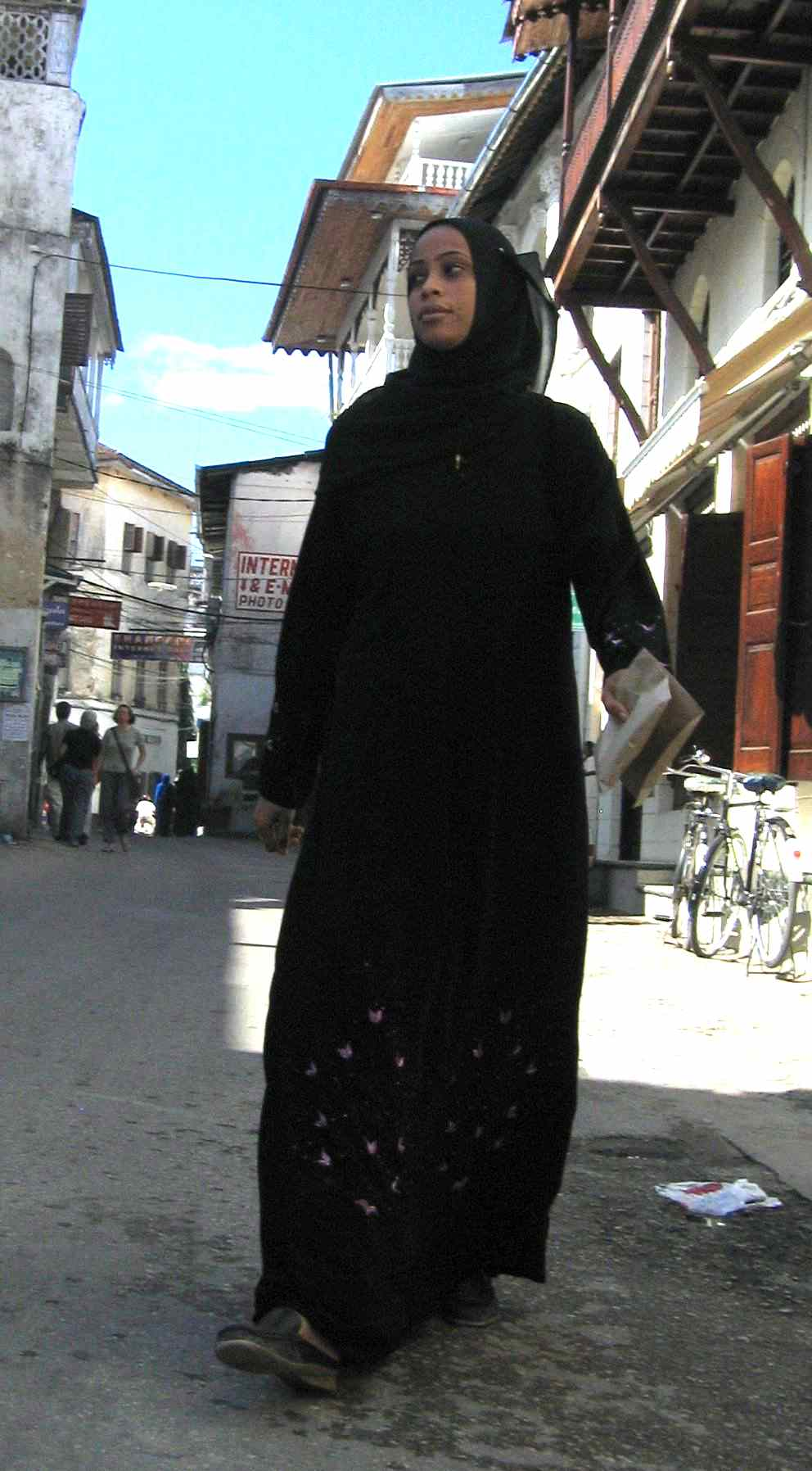
- Jilbāb, the wearing of which in a school was at the centre of the case.
- Court: House of Lords
- Decided: 2006
- Citations: [2006] UKHL 15, [2007] 1 AC 100

Court membership
- Judges sitting: Lord Bingham of Cornhill, Lord Scott of Foscote, Lord Hoffmann, Lord Nicholls of Birkenhead, Baroness Hale of Richmond

Keywords
- Religious dress, religious discrimination, Human Rights Act 1998

R (Begum) v Governors of Denbigh High School [2006] is a House of Lords case on the legal regulation of religious symbols and dress under the Human Rights Act 1998.

The case involved Shabina Begum, a Muslim pupil at Denbigh High School in Luton, UK, who sued her school. Begum opposed the schools requirement that she wear the shalwar kameez-style Denbigh school uniform instead of a longer, looser Muslim gown (a jilbāb), on the grounds that the uniform was not compliant with Sharia law. Begum lost her case in the High Court, won on appeal to the Court of Appeal, but then lost in March 2006 when the Judicial Committee of the House of Lords unanimously overturned the first appeal.

== The case ==
Shabina Begum (Bengali: শবিনা বেগম; born in the UK, aged 16 at the time and of Bangladeshi origin), was a pupil at Denbigh High School in Luton, Bedfordshire. Four out of the six parent governors were Muslims, the Chair of the Luton Council of Mosques was a community governor and three of the LEA governors were also Muslims. However the school also contained a significant number of pupils of other faiths and the school wished to be inclusive in serving the needs of this diverse community and regarded the school uniform as promoting a sense of communal identity. In addition to uniforms incorporating trousers or skirts, female pupils are also offered a uniform based on the Pakistani or Punjabi shalwar kameez with optional khimar. The school uniform was decided upon in consultation with local mosques, religious organisations and parents. The school considered the shalwar kameez ideal as it was worn by several faith groups and, accordingly, helped to minimise the differences between them.

For two years, Ms. Begum attended the school without complaint, wearing the shalwar kameez, but in September 2002, Ms. Begum, accompanied by her brother and another young male, went to the school and asked that she be allowed to wear the long coat-like garment known as the jilbāb. In the opinion of Begum and her supporters, the particular form of shalwar kameez offered by the school was relatively close-fitting with short sleeves, and was therefore not compliant with the requirements of Islamic dress as they are stated in Sharia law. Begum refused to attend for three years unless she was allowed to wear the jilbab to school. She said she believed that this was required by her Muslim faith, but also in contravention of the school uniform policy. In addition, the jilbab was, in the opinion of Begum and her supporters, a more culturally-neutral form of Islamic attire.

The school's supporters claimed that after Begum's parents had died, she had come under the undue influence of her brother Shuweb Rahman, a supporter of the pan-Islamist movement Hizb ut-Tahrir. They also argued that if Begum was allowed to attend classes wearing jilbab, other pupils would feel under pressure to adopt stricter forms of Islamic dress.

Begum, with her brother, issued a claim for judicial review of the school's decision not to allow her to wear the jilbab at school. The claim was made on the grounds that the school had interfered with her right to manifest her religion (Article 9 of the European Convention on Human Rights) and her right to education (Article 2(1) of the first protocol).

== Judgment ==
=== Appeals ===
Begum lost the case in the High Court, but later won on appeal to the Court of Appeal. The school appealed against this decision, and the case was heard by the Judicial Committee of the House of Lords. The Department for Education and Skills was allowed to make submissions in the hearing in the House of Lords. The House of Lords ruled in favour of the school. Begum was represented in the Court of Appeal and the House of Lords by the former Prime Minister's wife Cherie Blair QC.

=== House of Lords ===
Lord Bingham of Cornhill stressed at the outset of his judgment that,

this case concerns a particular pupil and a particular school in a particular place at a particular time. It must be resolved on facts which are now, for purposes of the appeal, agreed. The House is not, and could not be, invited to rule on whether Islamic dress, or any feature of Islamic dress, should or should not be permitted in the schools of this country.

The Law Lords took the view that a person's right to hold a particular religious belief was absolute (i.e. could not be interfered with), but that a person's right to manifest a particular religious belief was qualified (i.e. it could be interfered with if there was a justification).

Three of the five Law Lords held that Begum's rights had not been interfered with (Lord Bingham, Lord Scott of Foscote and Lord Hoffmann), and two held that they had (Lord Nicholls of Birkenhead and Baroness Hale of Richmond).

All five agreed, however, that in this particular case there were justifiable grounds for interference, one of the grounds being to protect the rights of other female students at the school who would not wish to be pressured into adopting a more extreme form of dress.

== See also ==
- Islam in the United Kingdom
- Islamic dress in Europe
- French law on secularity and conspicuous religious symbols in schools
