= Maggie Atkinson =

English academic

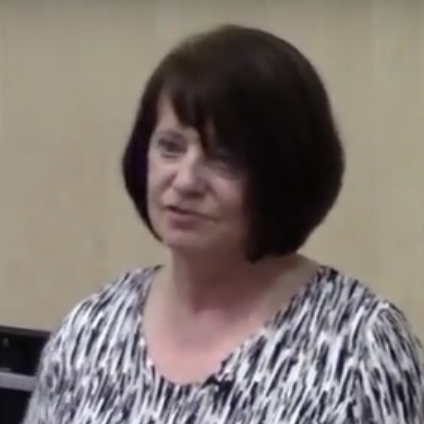
- Atkinson in 2013

Children's Commissioner for England
- In office 2010–2015
- Preceded by: Albert Aynsley-Green
- Succeeded by: Anne Longfield

Personal details
- Born: 16 September 1956 (age 69) Barnsley, South Yorkshire, England
- Education: Newnham College, Cambridge; University of Sheffield; Keele University
- Known for: former Children's Commissioner for England

Margaret Elizabeth Atkinson (born 16 September 1956) is an English educator and the former Children's Commissioner for England. After a career in teaching, she moved into public service administration, initially in education, but later in Children Services. Her appointment and tenure as Children's Commissioner was notable for a series of controversies.

== Early life and education ==
Atkinson was born in Barnsley, West Riding of Yorkshire (now South Yorkshire). Educated at Pope Pius X RC High School, Rotherham, and Mexborough Sixth Form College, she graduated from Newnham College, Cambridge in 1978. She received her teaching qualifications at Sheffield University in English, history and drama. She was awarded a Doctor of Education degree by Keele University in 2008 and an Honorary Doctor of Civil Letters degree from Northumbria University in 2010.

== Career ==
=== Education ===
She spent 10 years teaching in two different schools, becoming Head of English at Birkdale High School in Dewsbury. She became a National Curriculum regional co-ordinator in Yorkshire, before taking a variety of curriculum and children's services roles in local authorities across England.

=== Children's Services ===
Gateshead Council appointed her as Director of Children's Services in 2003, and she served as President of the Association of Directors of Children's Services in 2008.

=== Children's Commissioner ===
Atkinson was appointed Children's Commissioner in March 2010, Following a lengthy selection process, Ed Balls, the Secretary of State for Children, Schools and Families, announced that Atkinson was the preferred candidate to be put through the vetting process in front of the newly created Education Select Committee. But the committee rejected the appointment, forcing Balls to override their wishes by appointing her over their objections.

Her tenure was marked by occasional high-profile reporting in much of the press. In 2010, Atkinson wrote to Denise Fergus, mother of Jamie Bulger, to apologise for the hurt caused by Atkinson's remarks on the age of criminal responsibility. Atkinson had said in an interview that she believed the current age of criminal responsibility in England was too young at 10 years of age, and that it should be raised. During the interview she referred to the events surrounding the death of Jamie Bulger as "exceptionally unpleasant". Fergus called for Atkinson to be sacked.

A report by the Office of the Children's Commissioner in England in 2013 warned that many schools are conducting unlawful schemes of school exclusion for some poorly-behaved pupils, and suggested that schools should lose funding if they were found to have such policies. Controversially, the report concluded that schools should reduce all forms of exclusion and should cease excluding students altogether for minor offences like breaking the school's uniform policy.

In December 2013, in an interview with The Independent newspaper, Atkinson made clear her personal view that parental smacking of their children should be made illegal. The response by the government was that they had no wish to criminalise parents for issuing a mild smack, while the NSPCC welcomed the commissioner's comments.

=== Independent Safeguarding Board ===
In September 2021, she was appointed chair of the Church of England's Independent Safeguarding Board (ISB), newly created to provide independent oversight of safeguarding work throughout the national church, covering historical and current concerns. The ISB began working in January 2022.

In July 2022, a complaint was referred to the Information Commissioner's Office (ICO) that Atkinson had broken data protection rules during correspondence with a survivor of clerical abuse. The ICO issued a General Advice note on rectifying the error. In August 2022, a second breach of data was referred to the ICO, and Atkinson was asked to step back as chair while it was investigated by the ICO. In January 2023, a third complaint of a data breach was upheld by the ICO with a General Advice note issued. At the time she remained "stepped aside" as Chair.

In March 2023, following several unsuccessful attempts to reconcile matters between ISB members, she resigned as chair of the Independent Safeguarding Board due to her changing family circumstances and a wish to see matters move on. The Archbishops' Council appointed Meg Munn as acting chair.

== Media ==
In December 2013, Atkinson was a member of a team of Keele graduates appearing on a Christmas Special edition of University Challenge, answering questions on Andy Murray's first Wimbledon win and Hull as UK City of Culture. Keele beat the University of Aberystwyth by 140 points to 90 in the programme.
