= Peter Birkett =

British educator and entrepreneur

Sir Peter Birkett (born 6 November 1959) is a British educator and entrepreneur, currently known for being the Chief Executive of an educational consultancy company p5e and the Founder and Director of Highgate Hill House School in Devon. Peter Birkett was Knighted in the 2012 Birthday Honours for services to further education and the academy movement

== Early life ==
He attended Frederick Gough School in Scunthorpe. Birkett was first educated as an engineer and obtained a range of engineering diplomas. He then trained as a teacher at Huddersfield Polytechnic (University of Huddersfield), where he received his Certificate of Education in Educational Leadership and Administration. He then obtained a master's degree in leadership, Management and IT at the University of Reading.

== Career ==
Leaving school at the age of 16, he served a 5-year engineering apprenticeship attending college on a day-release basis, studying for engineering qualifications. Birkett started as an engineer in Clugston Engineer, Scunthorpe. On completion of his apprenticeship, he travelled to Australia to further and broaden his skills as a qualified engineer. In Australia he worked for Babcock & Wilcox and Kilpatrick Green before being made redundant due to a recession in Sydney, Australia. As a result of redundancy Birkett chose a change of career securing a position as a wine salesman at Pieroth French Wines, selling French wine to Australians. During his time as an engineer and selling wine, he found his passion in working with and teaching people. Upon returning to England, he trained as a teacher by Huddersfield Polytechnic. His first teaching appointment was at Basingstoke College of Technology in 1985 where he stayed after two promotions until 1996. He was then promoted to the position as Director of Technology and then Assistant Principal at Bristol College, Bristol, until he joined The Sheffield College as Vice Principal in 2002.

Birkett made history breaking new ground in 2007 when he became the first FE College Principal in the UK to be given approval by the then Labour Government to sponsor two underperforming schools and create a college led federation, Barnfield College. Birkett also in 2007 led the college through an outstanding OFSTED inspection, reaffirmed Beacon Status. Barnfield College was the largest college in Bedfordshire and Luton with a wide range of vocational courses and career opportunities, rated among the top 5% of colleges nationally by Ofsted and in 2003 became the first FE college to earn Beacon status. Under his management, Barnfield success rate was 94%, and the two previously failing secondary schools were rated number one and number three in Luton. The federation has been awarded as Best School Operator nationally in 2013 and shortlisted for School Operator – Academy Chain in the Education Investor Awards 2013. Today, over 45 colleges have adopted this model nationally.

In September 2013, Barnfield Federation was questioned by both the Skills Funding Agency (SFA) and the Education Funding Agency (EFA) into the alleged funding of "ghost learners" and financial mismanagement at Barnfield Federation. In the published findings from their investigations, they stated that they did not find any expenditure that would be considered profligate, although some academy expenditure is considered irregular and improper such as annual staff recognition events, expensive gifts and ornaments for staff. Salary and bonus of CEO and senior management are also stated as inappropriate without governor oversight. Birkett was considered highest paid further education head in the country. Against the wishes of the Board, Birkett resigned as CEO of the federation after signing a compromise agreement that protected both parties' interests.

After leaving Barnfield in August 2013 he joined GEMS Education as CEO for UK and Europe – he resigned in 2014, saying that the Department for Education investigation of the Barnfield Federation had "achieved prominence in the press" to stop the issue becoming "an undue distraction for my colleagues and the work of GEMS Education." As of 2015, Birkett then formed p5e (Passion5Excellence) in 2014. His organisation claims to be "Driving education and skills success through Partnerships and Innovative Practice". Their five key values are Fix – Implement school and college turnaround, Create – New schools, colleges, groups and structures, Change – Inject new thinking to improve performance, Find – Independent schools for private investors, and Help – Engaging all stakeholders to drive change.

In 2016, he founded Highgate Hill House School, a special education school in Whitstone, Holsworthy on the Devon/Cornwall border. It is a small independent co-educational school for children with Special Educational Needs aged 5 to 16 years. He is passionate about creating a school which is flexible and can adapt to students' needs. Their core curriculum includes outdoor learning and adventurous activities.

After identifying a former further-education college campus in Saltash as a suitable site, Sir Peter Birkett founded Fountain Head House School, which opened in 2021. He helped establish and develop the school to provide places for children with additional needs from Saltash, Plymouth and surrounding areas. The school continues to develop its provision to help pupils with special educational needs achieve their full potential.

In 2017, he launched a brand new PhD in ethical leadership, at St Thomas University, Texas. He claimed that in 2017 he would focus more on educational activities that enable young, special needs children to reach their potential. Also, he stated his interests in developing the next generation of business leadership potential through a series of talks and career advice

Birkett has been a Government adviser and Director on several National Boards. He has spoken and continues to present at national and international conferences around the world. Birkett is also a member of the Worshipful Company of Educators.

== Achievements and awards ==
In 2012 Birkett was runner up in the education investor – "individuals contribution" award.

In November 2013 Birkett collected the national Education Investor award for the best performing "School operator – academy chain" on behalf of Barnfield Federation. They were also named in the chain reaction report and one of the highest performing academy chains.

Highgate Hill House School in Devon, of which Sir Peter Birkett is the founder, has been shortlisted for multiple national awards including 'New Market Entrant' and 'Education Business of the Year' at the 2018 Education Investor Awards, 'Special Needs Initiative' at the TES Independent School Awards 2019, 'Employer of the Year' and 'Best Newcomer' at the Investors in People Awards 2020 and 'Outstanding Provision for Learning Support' at the ISA Awards 2020.
