= Nicky Cox =

British journalist

Nicky Cox MBE (born March 1966) is a British journalist. She is editor-in-chief of First News, a British national newspaper for children and of the paper's online news channel, First News Live!. She is also the CEO of indie production company, Fresh Start Media, specialising in documentary films for, or about, children.

== Early career ==
Nicky Cox began her career in regional newspapers, as a trainee reporter with the Croydon Advertiser. Eighteen months later she won the Jesse Ward Young Journalist of the Year Award.

She went on to work as a sub-editor on The Sunday Mirror and The Sunday Times. She took up the post of launch editor of Early Times, a newspaper for children, which had limited private financial backing. Cox took four child reporters to 10 Downing Street to interview Margaret Thatcher.

== First News ==
While working at the BBC, Cox first met Piers Morgan, who was editing The Sun newspaper's Bizarre page at the time.

Before the launch of First News, Cox worked as editorial director at Tree Top Media for four years launching magazines including Tinkerbell and Ant & Dec's pre-school animation, Engie Benjy, as well as ITV's Pop Idol. During this period, she became a BAFTA judge for children's television programmes.

The newspaper was launched by Cox and Morgan and Cox's cousins, Steve and Sarah Thomson, in May 2006. The official launch was held at a party hosted by Prime Minister Gordon Brown at Downing Street. The newspaper won an award from Save The Children for "Outstanding Contribution To Children". Cox collected the award from HRH Princess Anne.

In 2017, alongside First News, Cox started an indie production company, Fresh Start Media, with former BBC colleagues – Emmy and BAFTA award-winning Marshall Corwin and Chris Rogers. The company specialises in making news and documentaries for, or about, children. Fresh Start Media's first documentary for the BBC was called Too Many Guns, focusing on America's youngest gun control campaigner.

== Campaign work ==
Cox's Conflict Children campaign, supported by Save The Children and the Government's Department for International Development was signed-up to by 230,000 children across the country. The campaign was to raise awareness of the issues facing children caught up in wars around the world, particularly child soldiers. Nicky brought a choir of orphans from Uganda to perform at 10 Downing Street for Prime Minister Gordon Brown and his wife. Shortly after their return to Uganda, one of the children died from AIDS.

Cox has frequently toured UK schools on the First News Reading Tour with Henry Winkler, who writes the Hank Zipzer children's novels.

In June 2009, she was awarded an MBE in the Queen's Birthday Honours, for services to children.

First News has been awarded Weekly National Newspaper of the Year in the UK and Save The Children gave the newspaper its award for outstanding contribution to children. In 2014, Cox was a Woman of Achievement in the Women of the Year Awards.

She is a trustee of the British Plaque Trust, patron of the British Citizen Youth Awards, and a special advisor to UNICEF.
