= Yasmin Bevan =

British headteacher

Dame Yasmin Bevan DBE (née Prodhan born 3 December 1953) is an influential figure within the UK education system.

Bevan was the Executive Principal and Headteacher of Denbigh High School in Luton, Bedfordshire, from 1991 until her retirement in 2014. She contributed to policy development through the Expert Group on Assessment and the Practitioners Group on School Behaviour and Attendance. She has also chaired the Department for Education's Secondary Heads Reference Group from March 2010.

In 2007 she was made a Dame Commander of the Order of the British Empire for services to education and in 2013 she appeared in Who's Who.

== Awards ==
- Teaching Awards Special Commendation in 2003
- Teaching Awards Headteacher of the Year in 2005
- Awarded honorary doctorate in April 2008
- Became a National Leader of Education in 2009 (NLE)
- In 2009, Denbigh High School won the Times Educational Supplement's 'Secondary School of the Year' Award.

== Affiliations ==
- DCSF Secondary Education Adviser in June 2007
- Former member of DfEE Race Education and Employment Forum
- Former governor Luton Sixth Form College
- Member, governing council of the National College of School Leadership and Corporate Plan Reference Group (2000–04)
- Member, DfES headteacher reference group that advises the DfES Practitioners’ Group on Pupil Behaviour and Attendance
- Member of the DfES headteacher reference group that advises the Department for Children, Schools and Families
- Member of DfES citizenship education working party
- Member of the DfES Practitioners Group on School Behaviour and Discipline
- Headteachers' representative on a regional consultative head's group for the School Improvement Partners Programme
- NCSL Secondary Director (temporary secondment)
- DfES Ten year childcare strategy stakeholder group
- Advisory Group on National Leaders of Education 2006
