= The Chalk Hills Academy =

Coordinates: 51°53′49″N 0°29′29″W

Location
- Leagrave High Street; Luton, Bedfordshire; LU4 0NE; England

Information
- Type: Academy
- Motto: Integrity • Ambition • Excellence
- Sister school: The Stockwood Park Academy
- Local authority: Luton Borough Council
- Trust: Advantage Schools
- Department for Education URN: 135337 Tables
- Ofsted: Reports
- Principal: Natasha Jabbar
- Secondary years taught: Year 7 through Year 13
- Gender: Co-educational
- Age: 11 to 18
- Enrollment: 1401 (May 2021)
- Colour: Red
- Website: thechalkhillsacademy.co.uk

The Chalk Hills Academy (formerly Halyard High School, Barnfield West Academy and West Academy) is a Mixed secondary school and sixth form, part of Advantage Schools located in the west of Luton in Bedfordshire, England.

== History ==
Halyard High School converted to academy status on 1 September 2007 and became part of the Barnfield Federation. Many school buildings were renovated as part of Building Schools for the Future programme.

From 2006 until 2010, Rachel de Souza (now Children's Commissioner for England) was the headteacher at Barnfield West Academy and received recognition for improving the performance of the school since it became an academy, as noted in its Ofsted reports. With the academy being issued a "Outstanding" grade from Ofsted in its 2010 inspection.

In 2012, Barnfield West Academy achieved excellent value for money status from Ofsted as being run by a federation and was shown as good practice example in the governments drive to increase the number of academies.

In 2015, the school split with the Barnfield Federation and became part of The Shared Learning Trust. This was due to an investigation into the Barnfield Federation by the Skills Funding Agency & the Education Funding Agency into financial mishandling, claiming for students incorrectly and grade issues. The school was subsequently renamed West Academy for a short time before being renamed The Chalk Hills Academy in December 2015. On 1 September the academy joined Advantage Schools after The Shared Learning Trust merged with Advantage Schools.

== Notable alumni ==
=== Halyard High School ===
- Andrew Tate, social media personality and former kickboxer

=== Barnfield West Academy ===
- Jernade Meade, footballer
