= Barnfield College =

Further education college in Luton, Bedfordshire

Coordinates: 51.905913°N 0.421939°W

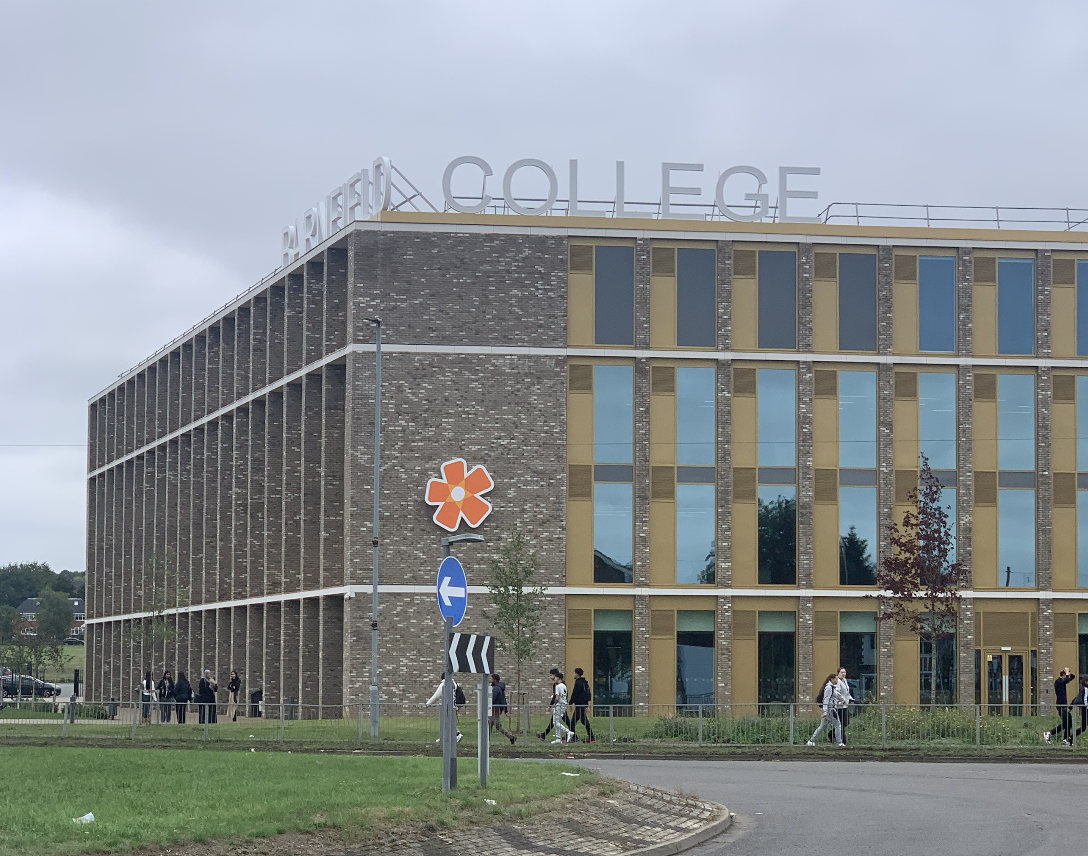
- Barnfield College Main Building

Location
- Barnfield Avenue; Luton, Bedfordshire, LU2 7BF

Information
- Type: Further education
- Established: c. 1968
- Founder: Jim Horroks
- Principal: Cath Gunn
- Website: www.barnfield.ac.uk

Barnfield College is a further education college in Luton, Bedfordshire, United Kingdom. Since 2019, Barnfield College has been a member of the West Herts College Group (WHC Group) together with West Herts College.

== History ==
=== Origin ===
In 1958, Luton Technical School moved to a new building off Barnfield Avenue, and the name of the school was changed to Barnfield Secondary Technical School. With the introduction of comprehensive schools in Luton in 1967, it became Barnfield High School. The number of pupils declined; in 1968 parts of the building were taken over for teaching hairdressing and dressmaking; and in 1970 the College of Further Education took over the whole building.

In 2003, Barnfield College became the first general further education college to be awarded Beacon status.

=== Barnfield Federation ===
Peter Birkett was appointed as principal in 2005, and the college became the first further education college in Britain to sponsor an academy school (Barnfield South Academy and Barnfield West Academy). By 2007, the Barnfield Federation included a nursery, primary and secondary schools and a college. In 2010, it opened one of the first studio schools in Britain (Barnfield Skills Academy). The Federation was also the first to launch a 14-18 Law & Accountancy Academy for students who would like to follow a career as an Accountant or Lawyer.

As of October 2013, the federation was under investigation by the Department for Education and the Skills Funding Agency. A key element of the investigation focussed on a £915,000 funding claim for students that did not study at the college. The outcomes of the investigations were jointly announced on 28 February 2014 by multiple news sources, which summarised reports from the Further Education Commissioner, the Skills Funding Agency and the Education Funding Agency.

In July 2014 it was announced that the schools would be split from Barnfield College to form their own multi-academy trust. The college would then focus on further and higher education provision. In 2015 the schools split from Barnfield and formed the Shared Learning Trust under the leadership of CEO, Andrew Cooper.

=== Merger with West Herts College ===
At the end of January 2019, the college legally became part of West Herts College, although it has continued to operate under the name of Barnfield College.

== Notable alumni ==
- Rankin, portrait photographer & director
- Glyn Dillon, graphic artist and costume designer

== See also ==
- List of UCAS institutions
- List of universities in the United Kingdom
