= Challney High School for Girls =

Location
- Addington Way; Luton, Bedfordshire, LU4 9TJ; England; 51°53′42″N 0°28′03″W

Information
- Type: Academy
- Motto: Respect, Opportunity And Achievement
- Local authority: Luton
- Department for Education URN: 144312 Tables
- Ofsted: Reports
- Headteacher: Sheba George
- Gender: Girls
- Age: 11 to 16
- Enrolment: 910
- Houses: Brady, Jemison, Ennis-Hill, Yousafzai
- Colour: Black
- Website: http://www.challneygirls.luton.sch.uk/

Challney High School for Girls is a comprehensive secondary school for girls, located in the Challney area of Luton, Bedfordshire, England. The school is situated next to Challney High School for Boys and the M1 motorway.

The school educates girls aged 11 – 16. For further education courses such as A levels, graduating students usually go on to attend Luton Sixth Form College.

In 2006, Challney High School for Girls was awarded specialist status as a Science College. The school continues to offer science as a specialism today.

In January 2011, Challney High School for Girls moved into a newly built school on Addington Way not far, almost directly opposite the old building.

In February 2017, the school was converted to an academy by Ofsted. The academy still operates under the name Challney High School for Girls, within the Chiltern Learning Trust. Recently, the school has been rated ‘Outstanding’ by Ofsted.

== Notable former pupils ==
- Nadiya Hussain, winner of the sixth series of The Great British Bake Off
