= 4Children =

UK charity

4Children was a charity organisation in the United Kingdom focused on children and families. Formerly, the National Out of School Alliance and then the Kids' Club Network, the organisation was established in 1983 for developing a concept of after-school provision following research conducted by the British Association of Settlements and Social Action Centre (BASSAC).

4Children ran 88 Sure Start Children's Centres across the country, 42 nurseries, 21 out-of-school clubs, and provided services in 24 activity centres at Royal Air Force bases in partnership with the RAF Benevolent Fund.

== History ==
=== 4Children ===
In 2004, Kids' Clubs Network changed its name to 4Children. It was officially launched at the organisation's annual policy conference, 'Tomorrow's World' at the Queen Elizabeth II Conference Centre in Westminster. The following year, the charity announced plans to expand their work by running children's centres in partnership with local government. In 2005, 4Children's first children's centre, the Carousel Centre in Essex, was launched. In 2009, 4Children launched the Family Commission, an inquiry that asked 10,000 families about their experiences of family life and family policy in the UK. Chaired jointly by Esther Rantzen and Anne Longfield, the report called for the extension of children's centres.

=== Partnership ===
4Children was Department for Education's strategic partner for early years. 4Children also ran a website, 4Children's Foundation Years to support early years professionals.

=== Campaign ===
The Make Space for Health campaign was the charity's longest running campaign to inform young people about healthy lifestyles.

== Closure ==
4Children's corporate growth under its chief executive, Anne Longfield, was not matched by growing revenues, and the charity ran into financial trouble. It ceased operations and entered administration on 1 September 2016. Before its financial difficulties were publicly known, Longfield was appointed Children's Commissioner for England. Many of its functions were assumed by Action for Children.
