= Woodlands Secondary School, Luton =

Woodlands Secondary School

Location
- Northwell Drive. Luton, Bedfordshire, LU3 3SP; England
- Coordinates: 51.916°N 0.449°W

Information
- Type: Special school
- Motto: Empowering young people to become successful adults
- Local authority: Luton
- Department for Education URN: 109744 Tables
- Ofsted: Reports
- Head Teacher: Sandra Clarke
- Gender: Coeducational
- Age: 11 to 19
- Enrolment: 259
- Website: http://www.woodlands.luton.sch.uk/

Woodlands Secondary School is a secondary school that caters for students with severe or profound learning difficulties, aged between 11 and 18. In Luton, England, the school currently caters for 265 young people. Sandra Clarke has been headteacher at the school since 2021.
