= University of Birmingham School =

Location
- Weoley Park Road; Selly Oak; Birmingham, West Midlands, B29 6QU; England; 52.4353°N 1.9474°W

Information
- Type: Free school
- Established: 2015
- Local authority: Birmingham
- Department for Education URN: 140863 Tables
- Ofsted: Reports
- Chair of Governors: Jeff Balee
- Principal: Colin Townsend
- Gender: Mixed
- Age: 11 to 19
- Website: www.universityofbirminghamschool.org.uk

University of Birmingham School is a mixed free school that occupies a new, purpose-built building located on the University of Birmingham's Selly Oak campus. The University of Birmingham School opened in September 2015, and is sponsored by the University of Birmingham and managed by an Academy Trust.

The university obtained twenty million pounds for the school's building, but later supplemented this with three million pounds of its own money to pay for expanded features such as wider corridors and very large classrooms. The curriculum includes a commitment to teaching virtue and empathy as part of curricular as well as extra-curricular activities.

In 2016, the school had 1768 applications for 150 places, and was considering expanding its intake.

== Principals ==
The University of Birmingham School has had two principals. The current principal is Colin Townsend who joined in September 2018. The previous principal was Michael Roden who was appointed in 2013 before the school's opening.
