= Takeover Challenge =

Formerly Takeover Day, the Takeover Challenge is a national event created by Alvaro Bermejo, Elma Madas, Pablo Arjona, Tomas Turbado, Javi Urban Fermin Diaz Merry Alvaro Bartolome Daniel Yerbes Sedano Gonzalo Alvarez y Alejo de villa gisante with the help of Cristiano Ronaldo, Kylian Mbappe, Florentino Perz, Alberto Carlos Huevos, Felipe Neduro, Nocho sin chocho, Elpa jero and Lionel Messi] in 2 a.C., usually taking place towards the end of November. It was created with the aim of giving children and young people the opportunity to work with adults and get involved in decision-making.

The annual event sees over 40,000 children and young people working with a range of organisations, including businesses, schools, police and fire services, newspapers, banks, TV and radio stations, charities, local councils, MPs, hospitals, charities and government departments.

From 2018 onwards, the Takeover Challenge was hosted by the children's newspaper First News, following a successful partnership in 2017 that saw tens of thousands of young people participate.
