= Jilbāb =

Long loose garment worn by some Muslim women

The term jilbāb (also jilbaab, jubbah or jilaabah) (Arabic: جِلْبَاب) refers to any long and loose-fit coat or outer garment worn by Muslim women. Wearers believe that this definition of jilbāb fulfills the Quranic choice for a hijab. The jilbāb is also known as chador by Persian speakers in Iran and Afghanistan. The modern jilbāb covers the entire body except the face and hands. Some women will also cover the hands with gloves and the face along with a niqāb.

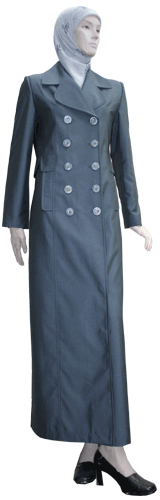
Jilbab

== Qur'an and hadith ==
A mention of the plural term of jilbāb, jalabib, is found in the Qur'an, verse 33:59 (Surah Al-Ahzab). A popular translation by Yusuf Ali of the transliterated Arabic goes:

Yā 'ay-yuha n-Nabiy-yu qul li'azwājika wabanātika wa nisā'i l-mu'minīna yudnīna 'alayhin-na min jalābībihin-na; dhālika adnā an yu'rafna falā yu'dhayn. Wakāna l-lāhu Ghafūra(n) r-Rahīmā(n)

O Prophet! Tell thy wives and daughters, and the believing women, that they should cast their [jalabib] (Jilbabs) over their persons (when abroad): that is most convenient, that they should be known (as such) and not molested. And Allah is Oft-Forgiving, Most Merciful.

A number of hadith commenting on the above verse of the Qur'an (33:59) mention the jilbāb.

Narrated Umm Salamah, Ummul Mu'minin: When the verse "That they should cast their outer garments over their persons" was revealed, the women of Ansar came out as if they had crows over their heads by wearing outer garments.

— Sunan Abi Dawud, Book 33, Number #4090 (Classified as 'Sahih' by Al-Albani)

Narrated Umm Atiyya: We were ordered to bring out our menstruating women and screened women to the religious gatherings and invocation of the Muslims on the two Eid festivals. These menstruating women were to keep away from the musalla. A woman asked, "O Messenger of Allah! What about one who does not have a jilbab?". He said, "Let her borrow the jilbab of her companion".

— Sahih Bukhari, Book 8, #347

== Definition and extent ==
The jilbab is a coat. It is rather loose-fitting, and resembles a long raincoat or trenchcoat.

Since there are no pictures of 7th-century jilbāb, nor any surviving garments, it is not at all clear if the modern jilbāb is the same garment as that referred to in the Qur'an.

The root of the word "Jilbab" itself is [جلب]. According to Mu'jam Maqayees Al-Lugha by Ibn Faris, the root has two meanings:

[Two meanings]: One of them is the arrival with something from place to place, and the other is something that covers something...

Al-Shawkani was of the view that a woman must cover her face with a Jilbab in front of non-Mahram men, and he takes this from a Hadith about pilgrimage and comments about its meaning. He also provides the views of both Ahmad ibn Hanbal and Al-Shafi'i:

...[A'isha said:] "The caravan would pass by us while we were with the Messenger of God, may God bless him and grant him peace, in a state of consecration (i.e., during the pilgrimage). When they came close to us, one of us would lower her jilbab from her head over her face, and when they passed by us, we would uncover it."...

== Sportswear ==
A type of athletic jilbāb was developed by Nike in 2006, allowing women to play volleyball while still respecting a traditional clothing style.

== In Indonesia ==
In Indonesia, the term jilbāb refers to a hijab in general, rather than specifically referring to a long and loose overgarment.

== See also ==
- Hijab
- Thawb
- Bisht
- Izar
- Shabina Begum
- Islam and clothing
