= Challney High School for Boys =

Location
- Stoneygate Road; Luton, Bedfordshire, LU4 9TJ; England
- Coordinates: 51.895°N 0.467°W

Information
- Type: Academy
- Department for Education URN: 136651 Tables
- Ofsted: Reports
- Principal: Mark Mailer
- Gender: Boys
- Age: 11 to 16
- Enrolment: 1083 as of January 2021
- Houses: Akeman, Watling, Ermine and Fosse
- Website: http://www.challneyboys.co.uk

Challney High School for Boys is a secondary school located in Luton, Bedfordshire, England. The school educates boys between the ages of 11 and 16.

== History ==
In 2006 the school was awarded Specialist College Status, with an emphasis on Science and Mathematics. In 2007, Ofsted judged Challney High School for Boys to be “Outstanding” with the same judgement of its English department in 2008. In 2009, Ofsted further highlighted Challney High School for Boys as one of 12 outstanding schools serving disadvantaged communities.

In June 2010, the management and the governing body of the school announced their intention of applying to convert the school into an academy. The school officially gained academy status in April 2011.

Challney High School for Boys became one of the first 100 National Teaching Schools in September 2011. Working with Denbigh High School they developed the Chiltern Teaching School Alliance (CTSA), a group of cross-phase schools allied through national sponsors and strategic partners to improve the quality of provision for all pupils across the age-ranges.

Challney High School for Boys are also the founder of the Chiltern Training Group (CTG) which they set up in 1993. The Chiltern Training Group is an Outstanding (April 2009) School Centred Initial Teacher Training (SCITT) provider.

The Chiltern Training Group is a Consortium of Luton and Bedfordshire high and upper schools and the Luton Sixth Form College and has developed a comprehensive programme of initial teacher training and continuing professional development courses. Through CTG, Challney High School for Boys also provides primary placements and secondary PGCE qualifications.

In 2013 Challney High School for Boys became a part of the Chiltern Learning Trust, a multi-academy trust comprising Denbigh High School, Challney High School for Boys and Dallow Primary School. The trust is led by a board of directors which consists of representatives from all three schools, with Adrian Rogers as chief executive.
