= Knowitalls =

2009 British game show

- Genre: Quiz show
- Presented by: Gyles Brandreth
- Starring: Jay Rayner; Adam Shaw; Natalie Haynes; Colin Paterson; Jim White; Ayan Panja; Simon Calder; Greg Foot; Chris Packham; Tessa Dunlop
- No. of series: 1
- No. of episodes: 15

Production
- Executive producer: Phil Parsons
- Producer: Barrie Kelly
- Production locations: London, England
- Editor: Nathan Carpenter
- Running time: 30 minutes

Original release
- Network: BBC Two
- Release: 27 July – 14 August 2009

Knowitalls is a British quiz show hosted by Gyles Brandreth. It was shown on BBC Two in 2009.

Filming took place between 15 and 21 June 2009. It was first broadcast on 27 July 2009. The show's strapline is that it's "the quiz without questions". The team that wins overall will win £15,000, the Knowitalls trophy and the title of "Britain's Biggest Knowitalls".

== Overview ==
=== Introduction ===
At the beginning of the show, before the title sequence, the 2 teams of 3 are shown locked away in separate rooms with Gyles saying in a voiceover:

"Completely on their own. Two teams with no books, no phones and no Internet. They've been given today's subjects and just one hour to pool everything they know before they try to prove that they are today's Knowitalls."

=== Experts ===
Each show has three experts sitting on a desk at one end of the studio. Each expert has their own specialist subject.

They are:

- Art & Literature – Natalie Haynes
- Business & Politics – Adam Shaw
- Entertainment – Colin Paterson
- Food & Drink – Jay Rayner
- History – Tessa Dunlop
- Natural history|Natural History – Chris Packham
- Science – Greg Foot
- Sport – Jim White
- Travel & Geography – Simon Calder

=== Round 1 – 45 Second Subject ===
Each player from each team has just 45 seconds to impress the experts with their knowledge of the subject given just one hour previously. They receive 1 point for an interesting fact and 2 for an astounding fact that impresses the expert. There are also bonus points if the player can find three words that the expert has chosen, which are shown on screen to the viewers at home. They get 1 point for each fact or 5, if they spot all three. No player can do 2 subjects.

=== Round 2 – 7 Second Sensation ===
One player from each team comes out to give one astounding fact about a subject chosen by one of the experts. The players have just 7 seconds to give their fact. The fact chosen by the expert as the more astounding wins the team 5 points. However, if neither player's fact is true, neither team scores. As with round 1, no player can do 2 subjects.

=== Round 3 – Quick-Fire ===
All 3 members of the team come out in front of the experts. They have 90 seconds to get as many key words as possible. Every subject given by an expert has 3 key words. If any of the key words are shouted out, then the team wins 5 points. They can pass to the next expert if they want to. The team with the most points at the end of the round wins the game.

== Results ==
=== Structure ===
Tournament overview with scores. The show order is shown in the number in the brackets

Round 1
(4)Janet's Team	78
Justine's Team	68
(6)Tim's Team	70
Jim's Team	65
(1)James' Team	76
Jennifer's Team	96
(5)Stuart's Team	41
Brian's Team	88
(3)Bob's Team	57
Keith's Team	67
(2)Barry's Team	63
Liz's Team	41
(7)Shahna's Team	34
Matt's Team	78
(8)David's Team	57
Kevin's Team	63

Quarter-Finals
(10)Janet's Team	78
Tim's Team	75
(9)Jennifer's Team	64
Brian's Team	76
(12)Keith's Team	94
Barry's Team	84
(11)Matt's Team	60
Kevin's Team	78

Semi-Finals
(13)Janet's Team	88
Brian's Team	98
(14)Keith's Team	67
Kevin's Team	63

Final
(15)Brian's Team	99
Keith's Team	91
