= The Book Quiz =

British television quiz show

- Genre: Game show
- Country of origin: United Kingdom

Original release
- Release: 2007 – 2008

The Book Quiz is a BBC Four quiz programme. The first series, first broadcast in 2007, was hosted by David Baddiel with a second 2008 series hosted by Kirsty Wark.

== Critical reception ==
Rupert Christiansen, writing for The Daily Telegraph, offered The Book Quiz as an example of the BBC's "dumbed-down arts coverage", calling it "breezy drivel" that does "little more than twitter." Alex Larman's review on guardian.co.uk said it was "hard to think of a more misconceived programme", "a very poor thing indeed" that seems to be "designed for, and by, people who don't read books."

== Guest appearances ==
Series number (Year)	Episode number	Airdate	Guests
Series 1 (2007)	1	17 July	Joan Bakewell - Richard Herring - India Knight - John Simpson
Series 1 (2007)	2	24 July	Stella Duffy - Daisy Goodwin - Michael Gove - Simon Hoggart
Series 1 (2007)	3	31 July	Natalie Haynes - Jon Ronson - Lionel Shriver - Mark Thomas
Series 1 (2007)	4	7 August	Kate Adie - Gyles Brandreth - Germaine Greer - Anthony Horowitz
Series 1 (2007)	5	14 August	Val McDermid - Julie Myerson - Brian Sewell - Toby Young
Series 2 (2008)	1	24 March	Giles Coren - Wendy Holden - Anthony Horowitz - Miranda Sawyer
Series 2 (2008)	2	31 March	David Aaronovitch - Daisy Goodwin - Simon Hoggart - A.L. Kennedy
Series 2 (2008)	3	7 April	Margaret Jay - Anne McElvoy - David Nicholls - Tim Yeo
Series 2 (2008)	4	14 April	James Delingpole - India Knight - Rod Liddle - Kate Mosse
Series 2 (2008)	5	21 April	Giles Coren - Wendy Holden - Margaret Jay - David Nicholls
Series 2 (2008)	6	28 April	David Aaronovitch - James Delingpole - Daisy Goodwin - India Knight
Series 2 (2008)	7	5 May	David Aaronovitch - Giles Coren - Daisy Goodwin - Wendy Holden
