= Public opinion (disambiguation) =

Public opinion is the aggregate of individual attitudes or beliefs held by the adult population.

Public opinion may also refer to:

== Film and television ==
- Public Opinion (1916 film), an American silent film
- Public Opinion (1935 film), an American film directed by Frank R. Strayer
- Public Opinion (1954 film), a French-Italian drama film
- Public Opinion (TV series), a 2004 British panel game

== Periodicals ==
- Public Opinion (Chambersburg), a morning newspaper covering the Greater Chambersburg area, Pennsylvania, US
- Public Opinion (magazine), an 1861–1951 British weekly
- Public Opinion Quarterly, an academic journal of the American Association for Public Opinion Research
- Watertown Public Opinion, a daily newspaper in Watertown, South Dakota, US

== Other uses ==
- Public Opinion (book), a 1922 book by Walter Lippmann
- Public Opinion, a character in Jacques Offenbach's operetta Orpheus in the Underworld

== See also ==
- Institute of Public Opinion, a public opinion poll institute
