= Elizabeth: An Intimate Portrait =

2022 nonfiction book by Gyles Brandreth

- Author: Gyles Brandreth
- Language: English
- Subject: Elizabeth II
- Genre: Biographical
- Publisher: Michael Joseph
- Publication date: 8 December 2022
- Pages: 576
- ISBN: 978-0-241-58258-9

Elizabeth: An Intimate Portrait is a 2022 book written by English writer and former politician Gyles Brandreth on the life of Queen Elizabeth II. It also focuses on her relationships with her family, friends, and the media. Brandreth had previously published a book on the Queen and her husband, titled Philip and Elizabeth: Portrait of a Marriage, in 2004. The new book contains new content about the death of the Queen, and her legacy. Among revelations within the book were Brandreth's statement that Elizabeth had a form of bone marrow cancer, which he wrote was multiple myeloma.

In her review for i, Eleanor Doughty stated that the book "is readable, but not all that revelatory" and added that "Brandreth is as much a character in this book as the Queen herself". Jake Kerridge of The Telegraph gave the book 3 out of 5 stars and noted that "many readers will find the bulk of the book fairly stale, as great swathes of it have been copied and pasted word for word" from Brandreth's 2004 book Philip and Elizabeth: Portrait of a Marriage as well as his 2021 book Philip: The Final Portrait.

The book was first published in the United Kingdom on 8 December 2022 by Michael Joseph. An updated edition with information on the 2023 coronation of Elizabeth's successor Charles was published on 31 August 2023.
