= Wordaholics =

- Genre: Comedy
- Written by: Jon Hunter, James Kettle
- Presented by: Gyles Brandreth
- Country of origin: United Kingdom
- Original language: English
- No. of series: 3
- No. of episodes: 18

Production
- Producer: Claire Jones
- Running time: 28 minutes

Original release
- Network: BBC Radio 4
- Release: 20 February 2012 – 8 October 2014

Wordaholics is a comedy panel show hosted by Gyles Brandreth. It started airing on BBC Radio 4 in 2012. The third series was transmitted in September 2014.

== Format ==
There are toponyms, abbreviations, euphemisms, old words, new words, cockney rhyming slang, Greek gobbledegook, plus the panellists' picks of the ugliest and the most beautiful words. It's the whole world of words in 28 minutes. Find out the meaning of words like giff-gaff, knock-knobbler and buckfitches; the difference between French marbles, French velvet and the French ache and hear the glorious poetry of the English language, as practiced by writers ranging from William Shakespeare to Vanilla Ice.

The rounds include:

- "Letter of the Week"
- "Not in so Many Words"
- "New Words for Old"
- "You Can't Say That"

== Guests ==
Guests include Alex Horne, Alun Cochrane, Arthur Smith, Dave Gorman, Ed Byrne, Hannah Gadsby, Helen Keen, Holly Walsh, Jack Whitehall, Jenny Eclair, Josh Widdicombe, Katy Brand, Lloyd Langford, Michael Rosen, Milton Jones, Natalie Haynes, Paul Sinha, Richard Herring, Robin Ince, Stephen Fry, Susie Dent.

== Transmissions ==
Series	Episodes	Originally released	
Series	Episodes	First released	Last released
1	6	20 February 2012	26 March 2012
2	6	3 April 2013	15 May 2013
3	6	3 September 2014	8 October 2014

== Episodes ==
=== Series 1 (2012) ===
No. overall	No. in series	Guests	Letter of the Week	Original release date
1	1	Stephen Fry, Milton Jones, Natalie Haynes, Lloyd Langford	the letter 'J'	20 February 2012
2	2	Natalie Haynes, Michael Rosen, Arthur Smith, Paul Sinha	the letter 'X'	27 February 2012
3	3	Jack Whitehall, Milton Jones, Susie Dent, Natalie Haynes	the letter 'B'	5 March 2012
4	4	Natalie Haynes, Michael Rosen, Arthur Smith, Paul Sinha	the letter 'O'	12 March 2012
5	5	Jack Whitehall, Milton Jones, Natalie Haynes, Susie Dent	the letter 'P'	19 March 2012
6	6	Natalie Haynes, Richard Herring, Alex Horne, Jenny Eclair	the letter 'F'	26 March 2012

=== Series 2 (2013) ===
No. overall	No. in series	Guests	Letter of the Week	Original release date
7	1	Alun Cochrane, Natalie Haynes, Susie Dent, Milton Jones	the letter 'G'	3 April 2013
8	2	Alex Horne, Natalie Haynes, Katy Brand, Richard Herring	the letter 'C'	10 April 2013
9	3	Lloyd Langford, Susie Dent, Dave Gorman, Natalie Haynes	the letter 'Q'	24 April 2013
10	4	Alex Horne, Natalie Haynes, Katy Brand, Richard Herring	the letter 'M'	1 May 2013
11	5	Milton Jones, Natalie Haynes, Lloyd Langford, Robin Ince	the letter 'W'	8 May 2013
12	6	Susie Dent, Lloyd Langford, Dave Gorman, Natalie Haynes	the letter 'T'	15 May 2013

=== Series 3 (2014) ===
No. overall	No. in series	Guests	Letter of the Week	Original release date
13	1	Lloyd Langford, Holly Walsh, Paul Sinha, Natalie Haynes	the letter 'A'	3 September 2014
14	2	Josh Widdicombe, Helen Keen, Susie Dent, Natalie Haynes	the letter 'K'	10 September 2014
15	3	Ed Byrne, Milton Jones, Hannah Gadsby, Natalie Haynes	the letter 'N'	17 September 2014
16	4	Josh Widdicombe, Susie Dent, Helen Keen, Natalie Haynes	the letter 'L'	24 September 2014
17	5	Lloyd Langford, Holly Walsh, Paul Sinha, Natalie Haynes	the letter 'S'	1 October 2014
18	6	Ed Byrne, Milton Jones, Hannah Gadsby, Natalie Haynes	the letter 'Z'	8 October 2014
