= Wendy Holden =

Wendy Holden may refer to:

- Wendy Holden (author, born 1965), English historical novelist and journalist
- Wendy Holden (author, born 1961), English novelist
