= Language Report =

2003 report

- Author: Susie Dent
- Publisher: Oxford University Press
- Publication date: 2003

The Language Report (or, strictly, the language report) was an account of the state and use of the English language published by the Oxford University Press (OUP) in 2003. It was compiled by lexicographer Susie Dent, best known for her regular appearances on the television word game Countdown, and was an annual publication until 2007.

== The 2003 report ==
The first Language Report, described by the OUP as "a frontline account of what we’re saying and how we’re saying it", reviewed, among other things, changes in the use of English since 1903, how new words come about, the language of the Internet and of text messaging (noting, for example, that on St Valentine’s Day 2003, more text messages than cards were sent), language relating to particular areas of activity (such as fashion, warfare, politics, music, business and sport), urban slang, American and “World” English (for example, that of Australasia and South Africa), as well as nicknames, quotations and personal names “which have transcended their owners” (for example, Ally McBeal, Elvis Presley and Delia Smith). There was also a list containing a word that typified each year between 1903 (gamma ray) and 2003 (SARS), a practice which continued with "a word a year" in future editions. (HarperCollins had produced a similar list in 1997 - from "radioactivity" in 1896 to "Blairite" in 1997.)

== 2004–2007 ==
Succeeding reports, which drew on the work of Oxford’s language monitoring programme, concentrated on developments over the previous period of twelve months. A discernible feature was the increasing prominence given to Dent herself. In 2003 she was identified as the author on the inside title page and, with a small photograph, on the inside of the dust-jacket, but not on the outside; in 2004 and 2005, her name was on the front cover, with a photograph on the back cover; in 2006, her name was shown on the spine and her photograph was on the front cover. The 2007 edition had the name in larger letters than the title or sub-title.

The second to fourth editions had slightly whimsical sub-titles:

- larpers and shroomers (2004);
- fanboys and overdogs (2005) (dedicated to Richard Whiteley, presenter of Countdown who died in June 2005);
- The like, Language Report for real (2006) (the title shown on the front cover, though with just The Language Report on the spine and inside).

The fifth edition in 2007, English on the move 2000-2007, was a retrospective of the early years of the 21st century.

The first and last words identified in each edition as representing the preceding century were:

- "hip" (in the sense of fashionable) (1904) and "chav" (2004);
- "peace economy" (1905) and "su doku" (2005); and
- "muckraking" (1906) and "bovvered" (2006).

A different approach was adopted in 2007 with ten words identified for each decade from 1900-99. Several words, such as "bling", "chav" and "sex up" were also chosen to represent 2000-07. "Footprint" (as, for example, in "carbon footprint") was referred to - almost in passing - as the choice for 2007.

There was no Language Report in 2008, but Dent produced a volume entitled Words of the Year that was published as a paperback by the OUP.

=== "Bubbling under" ===
A regular feature from 2004 was a section entitled “Bubbling Under” which recorded "words of the moment” that had not yet found their way into dictionaries but which “have shown clear signs of semi-permanence and of fairly wide usage". Examples were "crackberry", "fugly" and "gene editing" (in 2004), "chugger", "Google bombing" and "happy slapping" (2005), "WAGs", "dark tourism" and "blook" (2006), and "burkini" and "gingerism" (2007).

== The wider context ==
The Language Report was one of the more successful attempts to disseminate trends in English in a scholarly, but accessible and readable form. An earlier publication, though more traditional in format, had been the Oxford Dictionary of New Words, compiled by Sara Tulloch in 1992, while Bill Bryson's Mother Tongue: The English Language (1990) and Made in America (1994) provided, from the viewpoint of an anglophile Mid-Westerner, entertaining accounts of the development of English on both sides of the Atlantic Ocean. In 2006 the BBC television series Balderdash and Piffle, presented by Victoria Coren, highlighted how words found their way into the Oxford English Dictionary and the type of evidence that supported such entries. Referring to this process and to its illustration by Balderdash and Piffle, Dent noted that, since 2000, quarterly updates of Oxford's "revision work" had appeared on-line.

=== Good versus bad English ===
The Language Report first appeared at a time when there was concern in some quarters about a perceived decline in the use of written English due, in part, to the growth of e-mail and text messaging. Others, such as the broadcaster John Humphrys and the lawyer and ethicist Sir Ian Kennedy, were concerned about what Humphrys called “sloppy, overblown, cliché-ridden language” and Kennedy saw as the undermining of the "symbolic importance of language" (for example, in the field of health, talking about "the patient experience" rather than "the experience of patients"). The novelist Kingsley Amis (1922-1995), an admirer of Fowler's Modern English Usage (1926), was apt, as he himself put it, to "spot some fresh linguistic barbarism and [I] am off again".

However, Dent, who noted that "there has never been a finite golden age in our language's history, nor a monolithic, unified English", did not tend to take sides; rather, the Language Reports illustrated how English evolves and, for better or worse, is adapted for differing purposes and media. Dent anticipated in 2006 that "discussions of good versus bad English, and predictions as to which will conquer, will continue as they always have done"
