= Stone Blind =

2023 novel by Natalie Haynes

- Author: Natalie Haynes
- Audio read by: Natalie Haynes
- Language: English
- Genre: Fantasy, Greek mythology, historical fiction
- Publisher: Pan Macmillan (UK), HarperCollins (US)
- Publication date: September 15, 2022
- Media type: Print (hardcover and paperback), ebook, audiobook

Stone Blind is a novel retelling the Greek myth of the gorgon Medusa. It was written by Natalie Haynes, a British classicist and writer. The book was longlisted for the Women's Prize for Fiction and nominated for best fiction book at the British Book Awards.

== Plot ==
The story follows the life of Medusa, from her birth until the aftermath of her beheading by the demigod Perseus.

== Structure and style ==
The narrative is told through multiple point-of-view characters including the main character Medusa (both before and after her head is severed), an olive tree, and a crow. Several stories, including those of Medusa and Perseus' separate upbringings, the conflict between the Olympian gods and the Giants, and the pained relationship between Hera and her son Hephaestus, are told simultaneously, through a non-linear structure.

The novel uses familiar dynamics and frustrations to modernize the retelling, while placing it firmly in the mythological past. It has been described as a dark-comic retelling.

== Themes ==
The book deals with themes of violence and patriarchy as exemplified by the gods. This is personified by the violent actions of Zeus and Poseidon, as well as the cruel machinations of Hera and Athena, towards mortals and monsters alike.

== Development ==
Haynes was inspired to write Stone Blind after including a chapter about Medusa in her non-fiction book Pandora's Jar. In an interview, she said "usually, that would be enough—I would feel like I'd covered a character pretty thoroughly in a 9000-word essay examining their myth in ancient sources and then across time, right into modern ones. But I was still so mad about everything that happened to her when I finished that chapter. I couldn't get past it, how unfair it was at every stage. And if you're still angry after 9000 words, I figure you owe that character a novel". In another interview, she said the novel is "an attempt to retell the story of a woman who was viciously abused and assaulted and to see her neither as a monster, nor as a victim but as a person".

Haynes, who has written several other retellings of myths and hosted a radio show about classics, said of her work, "[t]he great delight of Greek myth is that there's so much of it, and it's so detailed and so human-centric but the women's stories have not really been told. So they are right there! And if, like me, you spend your entire life basically swimming around in Greek myth, there's just not a shortage of these stories, I could do them forever. That sounds like a threat, I realise...".

== Reception ==
Reviews for Stone Blind were generally positive, with reviewers praising the writing style and the feminist recentering of Medusa's story. Publishers Weekly said "[f]ans of feminist retellings will love this". In The Guardian, Alex Preston praised Haynes' work overall, writing "[h]ere, as elsewhere, Haynes is brilliant on the brutality of male violence" and that "Stone Blind acts as a brilliant and compellingly readable corrective". The Paideia Institute wrote, "[t]he swapping of narrative viewpoints and lack of linear plot can be jarring at first, but Haynes' sense of humor does a lot to smooth over lag in the narrative and refocus the reader". In The New York Times, Linda Rosenfield said "I admit that fantasy fiction has never been my preferred genre. Yet by the time I finished this otherworldly cri de coeur, I felt both wiser for it and glad that it had been written". For Paste, Lacy Baugher Milas wrote "'[w]ho decides what is a monster?' one of the Gorgon sisters asks. 'I don't know,' said Medusa. 'Men, I suppose.' It is Haynes who finally asks us why, in this particular case especially, we've chosen to believe them".
