= Whispers (radio series) =

British radio series

Whispers is a British radio panel game which was broadcast on BBC Radio 4 over three series from 2003 to 2005. The show was hosted by Gyles Brandreth, a former Conservative Party MP, and featured regular team captains Anthony Holden, Stella Duffy and Lucy Moore.

The quiz was based around scandals of the past. In the opening round, guests had to identify whether various pieces of information about celebrities were true or false, or a "whisper" — something which was widely said about the celebrity but in fact false.

The programme has subsequently been repeated on digital radio station BBC 7 and successors.
