= Guilty by Definition =

2024 novel

- Guilty by Definition, UK first edition cover
- Author: Susie Dent
- Language: English
- Genre: Crime fiction; Mystery fiction
- Published: 2024
- Publisher: Bonnier Books
- Publication place: United Kingdom
- Media type: Print (hardback)
- Pages: 400 (hardback edition)
- ISBN: 978-1-80418-394-6

Guilty by Definition is Susie Dent's debut novel. It was published by Zaffre, an imprint of Bonnier Books, in August 2024.

== Plot ==
Martha Thornhill has recently returned to Oxford from Berlin, to take up a post as senior editor of the Clarendon English Dictionary. (Note: A fictionalised Oxford English Dictionary) In April 2023, she and her editorial team of lexicographers (Simon, Alex Monroe, and Safi Idowu) receive a puzzling letter from an anonymous correspondent, who signs themself Chorus. With help from a part-time colleague, Shakespeare scholar Jonathan Overton, they work out that the letter refers to the unexplained disappearance in 2010 of Martha's older sister, Charlotte "Charlie" Thornhill. Chorus sends further letters that provoke the team to investigate Charlie's disappearance.

== Development history ==
The novel draws on Dent's own experience as a lexicographer, and her childhood love of both vocabulary books and crime fiction. Dent said that she and the protagonist "share very similar traits" and that she "[loves] the parallels between word detection and crime solving: they share the same requirements of looking for clues, gathering evidence, fathoming human motivations". Dent had previously written a number of non-fiction books, but she found the "weaving together of the story's intricate threads" and "keeping a close eye on the plot" to be tricky during the novel's development.

A sequel featuring the same characters, Death Writ Large (ISBN 978-1-80418-724-1), will be published in August 2026. The book series has been dubbed The Clarendon Lexicographers.

=== Publication history ===
- 2024, United Kingdom, Bonnier Books ISBN 978-1-80418-394-6, published 15 August 2024, hardback
- 2024, United Kingdom, Bonnier Books ISBN 978-1-80418-396-0, published 15 August 2024, e-book
- 2024, United Kingdom, Bonnier Books, published 12 August 2024, audio book (read by Louise Brealey)
- 2025, United Kingdom, Bonnier Books ISBN 978-1-80418-397-7, published 24 April 2025, paperback
- 2025, United States, Sourcebooks Landmark ISBN 978-1-4642-3607-5, published 30 September 2025, hardback

== Reception ==
Malcolm Forbes, writing in the Washington Post, liked the "elegantly tortuous narrative" that eschewed the hackneyed dreaming spires portrayal of Oxford, concentrating instead on the striking cast of characters. Both Forbes and Darragh McManus, writing in the Irish Independent, considered that the novel's use of unusual words, with digressions into their etymology, was a strength, though Forbes conceded that this occasionally detracted from the narrative. Ultimately, Forbes thought that the book was a "fiendishly clever and marvelously entertaining debut". McManus was fainter in her praise - without the linguistic embellishments, the novel was a "fairly standard" murder mystery. Sarah Lyall, writing in the New York Times, thought that the plot got "a bit tangled", but again enjoyed the novel's "delightful asides about usage, etymology and dictionaries".

== Sources ==
- Forbes, Malcolm (September 29, 2025). "'Guilty by Definition' is the perfect mystery for word lovers". The Washington Post. ProQuest 3255548553. Full access available to users of The Wikipedia Library.
- McManus, Darragh (April 11, 2025). "Susie Dent creates an enjoyable countdown to detective riddles in her first novel Guilt by Definition". Irish Independent.
- Lyall, Sarah (October 8, 2025). "Thrillers Guaranteed to Give You Goosebumps". The New York Times. ProQuest 3258619767. Full access available to users of The Wikipedia Library.
- Toner, Aine (August 9, 2024). "Countdown's Susie Dent: 'I wanted to explore the secret lives of words and those who document them'". Belfast Telegraph. ProQuest 3090820046. Full access available to users of The Wikipedia Library.
- Farnham, India (April 29, 2025). "Word play: An interview with 'Britain's most famous lexicographer' Susie Dent". The Bath Magazine. Archived from the original on August 8, 2025.
- "The Clarendon Lexicographers". Audible.
