= Darryl Francis =

British Scrabble player

Darryl Francis is a British author, mainly of books on Scrabble.

He was a co-compiler of Chambers' original Official Scrabble Words publication in 1988 and consultant on all future editions, along with ex ABSP chairman Allan Simmons. He is also co-compiler on the Collins Official Scrabble Words publication in 2007 and 2012, again along with ex ABSP chairman Allan Simmons.

Darryl Francis co-hosted a series of five short programmes for the BBC on the World Scrabble Championship in 1991, alongside TV presenter Alan Coren. He has also ghost-written many Scrabble books for well-known personalities, most notably ex-MP Gyles Brandreth.

In 1985, he was the series 6 champion for the UK game show Countdown. In 2013, he returned to the programme to participate in the 30th Birthday Championship, where he was the earliest series champion in the field.

He has also written extensively for the American journal Word Ways: The Journal of Recreational Linguistics, having contributed nearly 200 articles as of 2010. His articles on wordplay, word puzzles and all manner of word recreations have appeared regularly since 1968.

Francis has also appeared on Turnabout, BrainTeaser and Eggheads.
