= The Oxford Book of Theatrical Anecdotes =

2020 book edited by Gyles Brandreth

- Editor: Gyles Brandreth
- Author: Various
- Language: English
- Genre: Art History
- Publisher: Oxford University Press
- Publication date: 1 December 2020
- Publication place: United Kingdom
- Pages: 832
- ISBN: 978-0-19-874958-5
- LC Class: 202934896

The Oxford Book of Theatrical Anecdotes is an anthology of theatrical anecdotes comprising four-hundred years of world theatre history, from Shakespeare to the present day, edited by "lifelong theatre-lover Gyles Brandreth in the Oxford tradition."

== Contents ==
The book is "[d]ivided into eight sections, each headed with a Shakespearean quote," which is followed by "a brief selection of quotes about audiences and critics...before a return to stories about playwrights, producers and directors." The Daily Express noted a single error, which consisted of identifying David Kelly as a "charming, wiry, one-armed Irish character actor." In reality he had two arms, however he did play Albert Riddle, a one-armed character in Robin's Nest.

== Critical response ==
Christopher Hart, from Literary Review, called "[t]he inclusion of some of the recollections...baffling," and noted that Brandreth is "reliably funny." Yorkshire Magazine's Sandra Collard noted that the reader "need[s] to be an avid reader and an even more avid theatregoer to appreciate even a soupçon..of anecdotes," and noted that "[t]he prologue of the book is a mini masterpiece in itself." As the book's release was during the COVID-19 pandemic, Collard stated that the book "perhaps [makes you] feel sad at the demise of such a wonderful and necessary thing as live theatre." Paula Donnelly, for The Daily Express, noted that "with theatres closed because of the coronavirus, [it] is about as close to a play we can get at the moment – and it is well worth the admission price." Writing for The Sunday Times, Simon Callow opined that "[Brandreth] has put the theatrical profession and theatregoers everywhere heavily in his debt...[having] provided an alternative and very human history of the theatre." The Spectator's literary editor Sam Leith described it as "a doorstopping compendium of missed cues, bitchy put-downs and drunken mishaps involving everyone from Donald Wolfit to Donald Sinden."

Brandreth gave his first show on 10 October 2020 promoting the book at the Yvonne Arnaud Theatre, which, even though labelled "sold out" only had a quarter of the seats full under government restrictions and "[Brandreth] signed book and autographs from the edge of the stage from behind a four-foot square Perspex screen."
