= Natalie Haynes =

English writer, broadcaster, classicist, and comedian (born 1974)

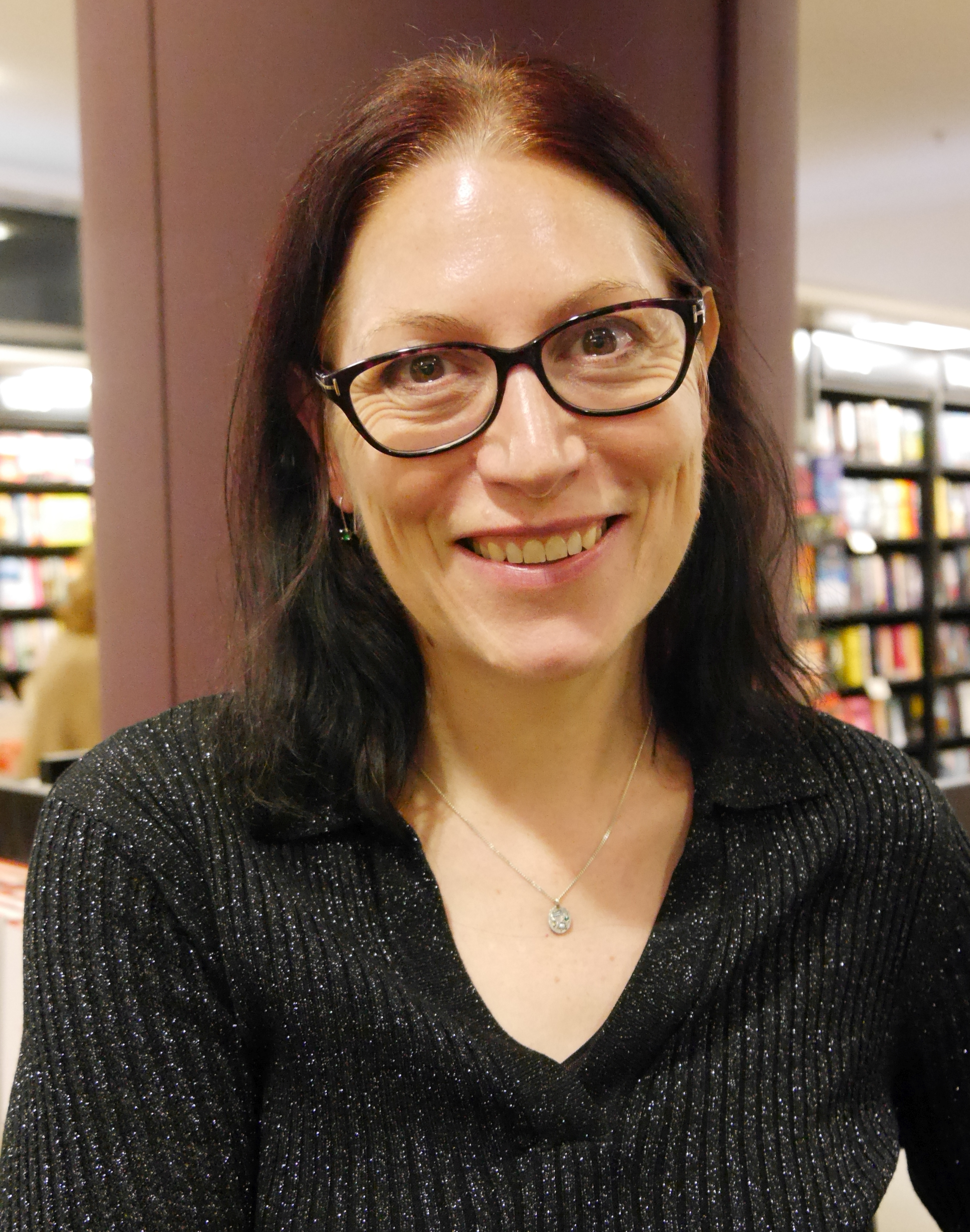
- Haynes in Waterstones, Piccadilly, London, 2022
- Born: Natalie Louise Haynes; 1974 (age 51–52); Birmingham, England
- Education: Christ's College, Cambridge
- Occupations: Writer, broadcaster, classicist, and comedian
- Website: nataliehaynes.com

Natalie Louise Haynes (born 1974) is an English writer, broadcaster, classicist, and "recovering comedian."

== Early life and education ==
Haynes was born in Birmingham, England, where she attended the private King Edward VI High School for Girls. She grew up in Bournville with her parents and older brother. Both her parents were teachers; her mother taught English and her father History. Haynes' grandmother had worked in a bookshop, and when Haynes turned 16 she started working in a bookshop after school. She read Classics at Christ's College, Cambridge, and was a member of the Cambridge University Footlights Dramatic Club where she overlapped with David Mitchell and Richard Ayoade. The time spent with the Footlights affected her studies and she completed her degree with a 2:1.

== Career ==
=== Stand-up comedy ===
After finishing university in the mid-1990s, Haynes performed as a stand-up comedian on the UK live comedy circuit for about ten years. At the beginning of her career in comedy, she briefly taught classics at Harrow to earn money. Described by critics as caustic and witty, Haynes has cited Blackadder as an inspiration for her comedy. In 1997, she was a finalist for the New Act of the Year (NATYS) award and the Leicester Comedian of the Year. She took shows to the Edinburgh Festival Fringe from 2002 to 2006 and went on tour in the UK and Ireland, as well as occasionally performing abroad, including in Berlin and New York. She was nominated for the Best Newcomer Award at the 2002 Edinburgh Fringe Perrier Comedy Awards, the first woman to receive this nomination.

==== Shows performed at the Edinburgh Festival Fringe ====
- 2002: Six Degrees of Desolation (nominated for Perrier Award Best Newcomer)
- 2003: Troubled Enough
- 2004: Still Not Sorry
- 2005: Run Or Die
- 2006: Watching the Detectives

Haynes is the only comedian to have appeared at every Newbury Comedy Festival.

=== Radio ===
Haynes has appeared on BBC Radio 4 as a panellist on Wordaholics, We've Been Here Before, Banter, Quote... Unquote, Personality Test and Armando Iannucci's Charm Offensive, and she has been an announcer on BBC Radio 4 Extra. She has contributed to the BBC 7 comedy review show Serious About Comedy and has been a contributor on Front Row.

Her stand-up has featured in Front Row and Loose Ends on BBC Radio 4 and Spanking New on BBC 7. She appeared in BBC Radio 4's Pick of the Fringe in 2004 and 2005. She has also appeared on BBC Radio 5 Live's Anita Anand Show, and MacAulay and Co. on BBC Scotland.

In 2005 and 2006, Haynes wrote and presented Laughing Matters, two documentaries on the search for role models for modern female comedians, for BBC Radio 4. Her subjects included the modern female writers Jessica Mitford, Dorothy Parker and Julie Burchill, and the classical male writers Aristophanes, Juvenal and Martial.

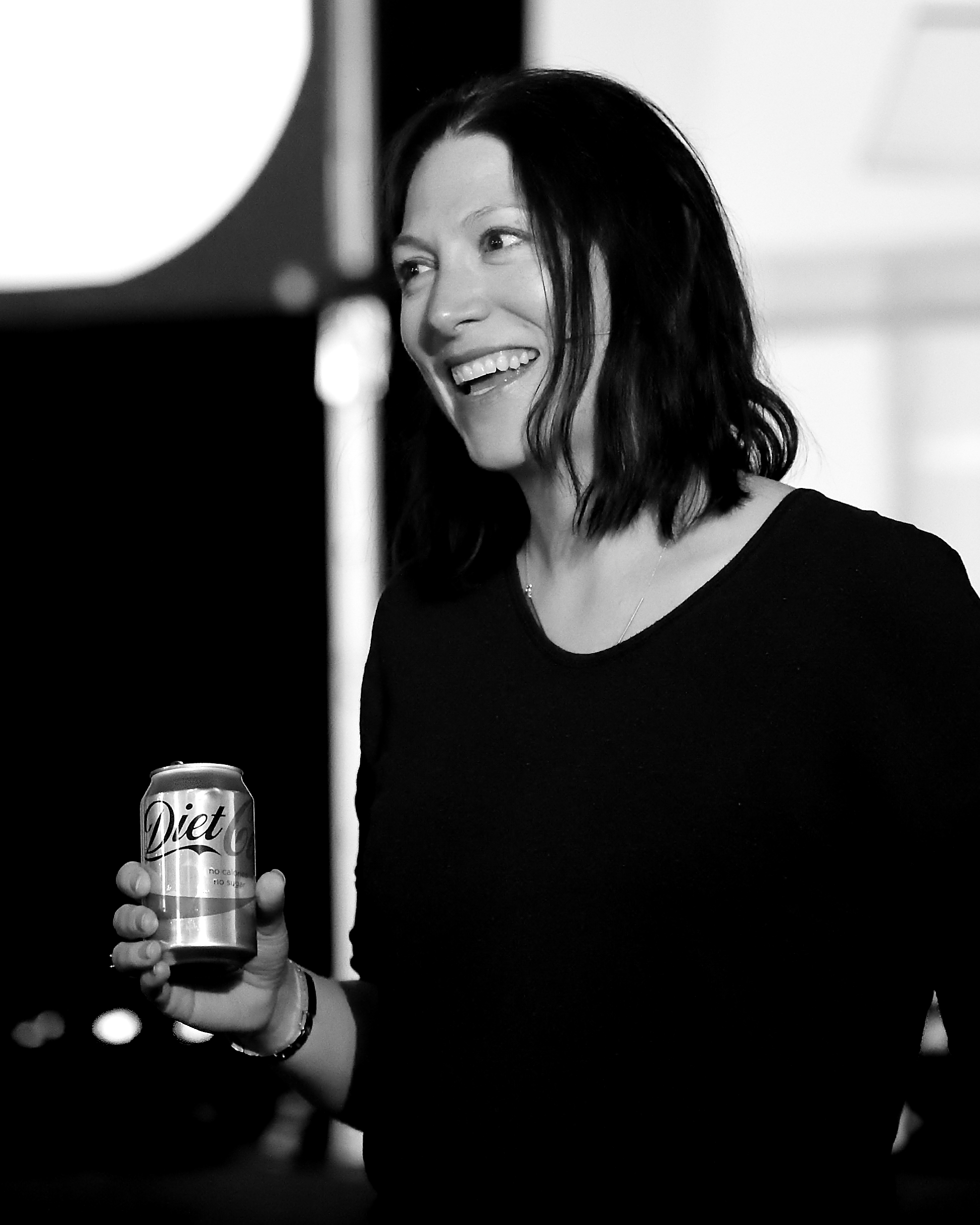
Haynes in 2015

She appeared as a critic on Saturday Review on BBC Radio 4. Her programme OedipusEnders, on the parallels between Greek tragedy and TV soap operas, was broadcast on Radio 4 in 2010. in 2011, Radio 4 broadcast her half-hour programme Attila the Hen, about raising urban chickens in our time compared to Ancient Rome. From 2012 to 2014, Haynes was a regular panellist on Gyles Brandreth's Wordaholics, a Radio 4 comedy panel game about words. In 2013, she was the star of the BBC Radio 4 programme With Great Pleasure. Her guests included the novelist Julian Barnes, who read from one of his own books. The programme Natalie Haynes' Brave New Algo-World, first broadcast in 2014, followed her attempts to find the algorithm for the perfect joke. In The Art of Adultery, broadcast in 2016, Haynes explored infidelity as an inspiration for artists, writers and dramatists through the ages. She has been a recurring guest on Armando Iannucci's Radio 4 programme Strong Message Here.

==== Natalie Haynes Stands Up for the Classics ====
In March 2014, BBC Radio 4 began broadcasting the comedy series Natalie Haynes Stands up for the Classics. Written and presented by Haynes, the programme offers new perspectives of figures and institutions from classical antiquity, with Haynes balancing comedy and tragedy in front of a live audience. Regular guests on the programme include Edith Hall, Islam Issa, Llewellyn Morgan, Adam Rutherford, and others. Series 1-9 each contained 4 half-hour episodes, the following series contained 7 episodes, including a Christmas special in series 10. Series 6 is the only series not recorded in front of an audience due to lockdown restrictions during the COVID-19 pandemic in 2020. Haynes recorded the episodes at home and the series was temporarily renamed Natalie Haynes Sits Down for the Classics.

Notable episodes include Haynes' retelling of all 24 books of Homer's Odyssey in 28 minutes (series 8, episode 1) and of Virgil's Aeneid in 27 minutes (series 11, episode 7).

==== List of episodes of Natalie Haynes Stands up for the Classics ====
Series	No. of episodes	Subjects	First broadcast dates
1	4	Aspasia, Virgil, Sophocles, Petronius.	24 March – 14 April 2014
2	4	Aristophanes, Ovid, Plato, Agrippina the Younger	11 April – 2 May 2016
3	4	Sappho, Cicero, Lucian, Juvenal	3-24 August 2017
4	4	Phryne, Horace, Euripides, Livy	30 July – 20 August 2018
5	4	Aristotle, Roman British Women: Claudia Severa, Suetonius, Homer's Iliad	23 December 2019 – 13 January 2020
6	4	Helen of Troy, Penthesilea, Amazon Warrior Queen, Eurydice, Penelope	17 May – 7 June 2020
7	4	Medusa, Pandora, Jocasta, Clytemnestra	8 May – 8 June 2021
8	4	Pompeii, Spartan Women, Lucretius, Homer: The Odyssey	14 August – 4 September 2022
9	4	Martial, Demeter, Athene, Livia	28 November – 19 December 2023
10	6	Cleopatra, Hesiod, Aphrodite, Artemis, Aesop, Tacitus	8 July – 19 August 2024
2024 Christmas Special	1	Saturnalia	26 December 2024
11	7	Alexandria: The City, Alexandria: The Library, Hera, Catullus, Hestia, The Aeneid	22 July – 2 September 2025
12	?	Alexandria: The Science, Nero, The Oracle at Delphi, Hypatia, The Argonautica, Roman True Crime, Medea	31 July – 10 September 2026

In 2015, Haynes was awarded the Classical Association Prize for her contribution to the promotion of Classics.

=== Writing ===
==== Non-fiction ====
Haynes has written three non-fiction books. The Ancient Guide to Modern Life, on the subject of how living well in the present requires some recourse to the ancient world, was published by Profile Books in November 2010. She developed a live show to promote the book at festivals, which she later pitched to the BBC as a "stand-up/Classics crossover" and which then became her Radio 4 series Natalie Haynes Stands Up for the Classics.

Her second non-fiction book, Pandora's Jar: Women in the Greek Myths, was published by Picador in October 2020, and was a New York Times bestseller. Margaret Atwood called it "funny" and "sharp". British composer Floating Points cites Haynes' exploration of the way translations of ancient texts have distorted the depiction of women in classical literature as an inspiration for his original score for the ballet Mere Mortals, which he composed for the San Francisco Ballet in 2024.

Haynes' third non-fiction book, Divine Might: Goddesses in Greek Myth, was published by Pan Macmillan in 2023.

==== Fiction ====
Her first children's book, the novel The Great Escape, was published by Simon & Schuster in September 2007. It won a PETA Proggy award, for best animal-friendly children's book, in 2008.

Haynes's first novel, Amber Fury (titled The Furies in the U.S.), was published in 2014. It was shortlisted for the Scottish Crime Book of the Year award.

Her second novel, Children of Jocasta, a retelling of Antigone and Oedipus Rex, was published in 2017.

In A Thousand Ships, her third novel, Haynes retells the myths of the Trojan War from the perspective of the women involved. It was published by Pan Macmillan on 4 May 2019. Haynes discussed the novel on BBC Radio 4's Woman's Hour that month. A Thousand Ships was shortlisted for the Women's Prize for Fiction in 2020.

Haynes's fourth novel, Stone Blind, a retelling of the myth of Medusa, was published by Pan Macmillan on 15 September 2022, and an abridged version was read on BBC Radio 4 by Susannah Fielding. In March 2024, the German edition of the title was shortlisted for the Young Adult Jury Award of the German Youth Literature Awards. It was adapted for radio by Radio 4 as a 10-part series and was first broadcast in September 2022.

In her novel No Friend to This House, published by Pan Macmillan in 2025, Haynes reimagines the myth of Medea and of the women in her life.

Haynes has narrated the audiobooks of her work herself. Speaking of the recording of No Friend to This House, Haynes said her emotional connection to the novel was so strong, she can be heard crying in some parts of the recording.

==== Essays and short stories ====
Haynes contributed the essay Girls, Guns, Gags to Serenity Found, a collection of essays about Joss Whedon's television show Firefly, edited by Jane Espenson and published in 2007 by BenBella Books. Cassell's Little Black Book of Books, published in 2007, includes her entries on subjects from Agatha Christie to E. F. Benson.

Haynes wrote the short story The Two Penelopes for the 2014 anthology A Midlands Odyssey which transplants the stories from the Odyssey to the modern-day Midlands. The Two Penelopes and two other stories from A Midlands Odyssey were adapted for radio and broadcast on Radio 4 in 2014. Her short story Letter from Eurydice was broadcast on Radio 4 in December 2017.

She contributed the short story The Unravelling for Marple: Twelve New Stories, a collection of original short stories featuring Agatha Christie's Jane Marple, written by twelve modern authors and published in 2022. Three of the twelve stories, including Haynes', were adapted for radio and broadcast on Radio 4 in December 2022.

=== Television ===
Haynes was a regular contributor to the BBC's The Review Show and was the most-booked guest on More4's The Last Word. She appeared as a panellist on BBC 4's The Book Quiz and on its Poetry Special alongside Andrew Motion and George Szirtes. She also appeared on the BBC Two documentary programme Backlash in 2005, in an episode on voluntary childlessness, and wrote and performed in the STV/Assembly Television Best of the Fest in August 2005. Haynes has been a panellist on BBC Four's quiz show Mindgames, appeared on Must Try Harder on BBC Two in 2006, and was a regulator contributor on Newsnight's review segment and was the art and literature expert on the BBC Two quiz show Knowitalls.

In August 2007, when she appeared on an episode of The Book Quiz hosted by David Baddiel, she admitted researching a book on Wikipedia in order to bluff having read it.

In April 2008, Haynes was a member of the stand-up comedians' team on University Challenge: The Professionals. Her team lost to the Ministry of Justice, 100 points to 215. In November 2009, she appeared on BBC One's Question Time.

In February 2022, Haynes was announced as the new presenter of the online revival of Time Team, alongside Gus Casely-Hayford.

=== Journalism ===
Haynes has been a guest contributor for The Times since October 2006, and was a regular contributor to New Humanist. She has also written for The Guardian, The Sunday Times Magazine, The Sunday Telegraph, The Big Issue, Loaded and The Independent.

== Works ==
- The Great Escape (Simon & Schuster, 2007) ISBN 978-1-41692-605-4
- The Ancient Guide to Modern Life (Profile Books, 2010) ISBN 978-1-84765-293-5
- The Amber Fury (Corvus, 2014) ISBN 978-1-78239-275-0
- The Children of Jocasta (Pan Macmillan, 2017) ISBN 978-1-5098-3615-4
- A Thousand Ships (Pan Macmillan, 2019) ISBN 978-1-5098-3619-2
- Pandora's Jar: Women in the Greek Myths (Pan Macmillan, 2020) ISBN 978-1-5098-7311-1
- Stone Blind: Medusa's Story (Pan Macmillan, September 2022) ISBN 978-1-5290-6147-5
- Divine Might: Goddesses in Greek Myth (Pan Macmillan, October 2023) ISBN 978-1-5290-8948-6
- No Friend to This House (Pan Macmillan, September 2025) ISBN 978-1-5290-6154-3
