= Discovering Gardens =

Factual television-based documentary

Discovering Gardens is a British documentary television series commissioned by Television South West. It is presented by Gyles Brandreth and his wife Michèle Brown, who explore public gardens across South West England while speaking to the people that created and maintain them. It was produced by Peter Watson-Wood.

== Episodes ==
Comprising thirteen episodes it originally aired from 1988 to 1989. It was repeated in the UK during 2025 on Rewind TV.

1. Trelissick

2. Barrington Court

3. East Lambrook Manor

4. Knightshayes Court

5. Cotehele

6. Docton Mill

7. Tintinhull Garden

8. Lanhydrock House

9. Coleton Fishacre

10. Marwood Hill Gardens

11. Trebah

12. Bicton House

13. Clapton Court
