= Rewind TV (British TV channel) =

British television channel

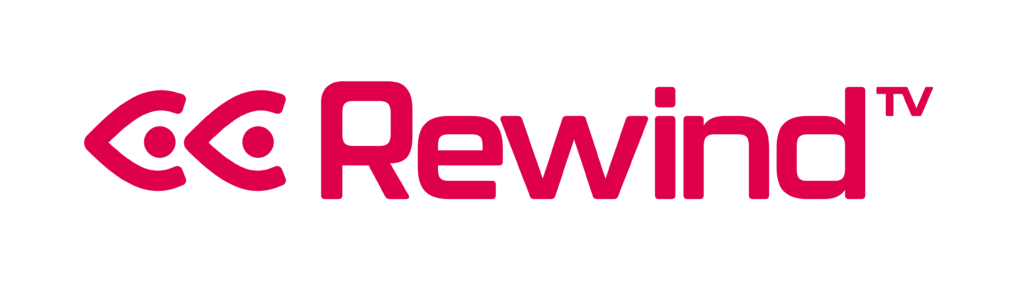
- Broadcast area: United Kingdom
- Headquarters: Sheffield, South Yorkshire, England

Programming
- Language: British English
- Picture format: 576i (SDTV) 4:3 – main programming; 576i (SDTV) 16:9 – commercials, interstitial content

Ownership
- Owner: Rewind TV Ltd

History
- Launched: 23 May 2024; 2 years ago

Links
- Website: rewindtv.uk

Availability

Terrestrial
- Freeview: Channel 81
- Sky UK: Channel 182

Streaming media
- Freely: Channel 125

Rewind TV is a British free-to-air television channel specialising in British and American vintage television series and programmes. It launched on Sky on 23 May 2024 and on Freeview on 18 September 2024. Its programming is similar to that offered by Talking Pictures TV and That's TV's network. The channel is presided over by Oscar Beuselinck and Jonathan Moore who have long experience in the video and DVD publishing industry.

== History ==
Rewind TV started test transmissions on or before 7 May 2024, initially launching on Sky from 23 May. The surge in nostalgia-based channels came after the main terrestrial channels drifted more towards programming produced post-2000. At launch time, Rewind TV promised an "antidote" to the current status of British television, especially the state of current dramas and how streaming platforms commission "by algorithm" in order to attract more viewers. Some older programmes, like many films of earlier times, contain behaviours which may currently offend some viewers, so, instead of not showing them or censoring them, they are shown with on-screen warnings and sometimes after the 9pm watershed.

Initially, Beuselinck and Moore planned to start the channel before the pandemic in 2020, but technical delays and the advertising crash complicated matters. The channel was set up at a cost of hundreds of thousands of pounds for archival programming on the cheap, but the ownership of certain programmes at the time of founding got more complex for the founders to track down.

By late August 2024, Rewind TV was hinting at a possible Freeview launch, following the shutdown of TalkTV and Seen on TV, and the spare capacity left by its closures. On Twitter, the channel posted an announcement hinting at an 18 September launch date. This was confirmed in Freeview's September update, with sitcom Watching becoming the first series seen. Its launch on the platform enabled Rewind to better compete with similar archive TV channels. Having launched on Freeview channel 95, it moved to channel 92 on 26 March 2025. The channel moved again from Freeview channel 92 to 81 on 18 June 2025, being placed alongside Talking Pictures TV. The move came after co-founder Jonathan Moore complained about the extant channel allocation, which was closer to shopping and religious channels, and that the new slot would increase the channel's access and relevance.

In addition to the scheduling of mostly vintage British programming, Rewind TV started to acquire programmes from the United States. Such programmes include Married with Children, I Dream of Jeannie, Born Free, Police Woman, and The Monkees. These came into effect in November 2024. Rewind TV also started to show original programming, including a career review of Michael Aspel branded My TV Rewind, Auto Rewind with Jack Pegoraro from the Number 27 YouTube channel, An Hour with... Enn Reitel, Tracing The Rails with BBC Sussex presenter Stephen Cranford, and video jockey music video programmes in the form of Stereo Underground and Bubblegum & Cheese, both former BBC Radio Solent shows and led by Richard Latto and Alex Dyke respectively. The first editions of both were broadcast on 20th December in 2024.

=== Television series ===
Rewind TV featured several classic television series from Hat Trick Productions, such as Game On and Drop the Dead Donkey; the pre-ITV Westcountry franchises Westward and TSW in Devon and Cornwall; and programmes from American broadcasters, such as the colourized first season of Bewitched, I Dream of Jeannie and SOAP. In April 2025, it was announced that the channel would move away from acquiring American series and refocus on British series and films, with a Norman Wisdom season due to be broadcast in June.

==== British programmes ====
Programmes acquired as of April 2025 include:

- Boon
- Bottle Boys
- Bramwell
- Brass, with Timothy West
- Carry On Laughing
- Danger Man
- Discovering Gardens
- Doctor in the House
- Drop the Dead Donkey
- Game On
- In Loving Memory, with Thora Hird and Christopher Beeny
- Lucky Feller, with David Jason
- Only When I Laugh
- Please Sir!
- The Strange World of Gurney Slade, with Anthony Newley
- Stereo Underground
- The Upper Hand
- That's My Dog, hosted by Derek Hobson (TSW)
- Thick as Thieves, with John Thaw and Bob Hoskins
- TV BURP
- UFO
- Walking Westward, hosted by Clive Gunnell
- You're Only Young Twice, with Peggy Mount

=== Films ===
The channel has a late-night slot, introduced as "Rewind After Hours" and "intended for adult audiences", in which they show films such as horror films and sex comedies.

== See also ==
Television in the United Kingdom
