= A Thousand Ships =

Book by Natalie Haynes

- Book cover of first UK edition
- Author: Natalie Haynes
- Audio read by: Natalie Haynes
- Language: English
- Subject: Trojan War
- Genre: Fantasy, Greek mythology
- Publisher: Pan Macmillan (UK); HarperCollins (US)
- Publication date: 2 May 2019
- Media type: Print (hardcover and paperback), ebook, audiobook
- ISBN: 9781509836192
- Website: nataliehaynes.com/a-thousand-ships/

A Thousand Ships is a 2019 novel by Natalie Haynes which retells the mythology of the Trojan War from the perspective of the women involved. It was shortlisted for the 2020 Women's Prize for Fiction.

== Format ==
As a framing device, the muse Calliope narrates numerous stories from the perspective of the women involved in the Trojan War to an unnamed (but implied to be Homer) male poet. The women tell their stories with occasional interjections and commentary from Calliope, including Hecabe, Briseis, Andromache, Cassandra, Creusa, Penelope, Clytemnestra, Iphigenia, Laodamia and Penthesilea, as well as some female goddesses, including Oenone, Thetis, Eris, Themis, and Athena.

== Development ==
Haynes' motivation for A Thousand Ships was to illuminate women's stories in the classics. In an interview, she said "I knew I wanted to tell the women’s stories because they have been almost entirely overlooked. The characters are right there, in the shadows, waiting to be found. It was irresistible". In another interview, she said "[t]he fact that women’s narratives have been historically overlooked is a tremendous result if, like me, you love these myths and have been immersed in them since childhood, and also want to write your own versions of them".

In an interview with NPR, Haynes said that one inspiration for writing the novel came from a documentary about restorative justice in Rwanda following the Rwandan genocide because "I remember thinking, I guess justice is one way of describing this. It doesn't look to me like these women are receiving any kind of justice. It looks like they're having to tolerate what they're given because there's no alternative. That theme ran through writing A Thousand Ships for me".

Haynes, who has written several other retellings of myths and hosted a radio show about classics, said of her work, "I’m just trying to show people that [the classics] are much more complex and interesting, filled with many more characters (women, obviously, for a start) and characters with many more stories attached to their names than we might know."

== Reception ==
Reviews for A Thousand Ships were generally positive, with reviewers praising the writing style and the feminist recentering of classic myths. Publishers Weekly called the novel "an enthralling reimagining" and wrote "Haynes shines by twisting common perceptions of the Trojan War and its aftermath in order to capture the women’s experiences". Elizabeth Lowry in The Guardian wrote "[t]his subversive reseeing of the classics is a many-layered delight". In The New York Times, Claire Jarvis called the novel "savvy and well plotted". For NPR, Melissa Gray called the novel "a fresh and utterly satisfying feminist take on one of the oldest stories in Western literature". In The Washington Post, Carol Memmott wrote "'A Thousand Ships' does more than acknowledge the suffering of women. It tells in lively fashion gripping tales of bravery, treachery and revenge".

The novel was shortlisted for the 2020 Women's Prize for Fiction. It was named a best book of the year by several publications, including NPR and The Guardian.
