= Susie Dent =

English lexicographer (born 1964)

Susie Dent MBE
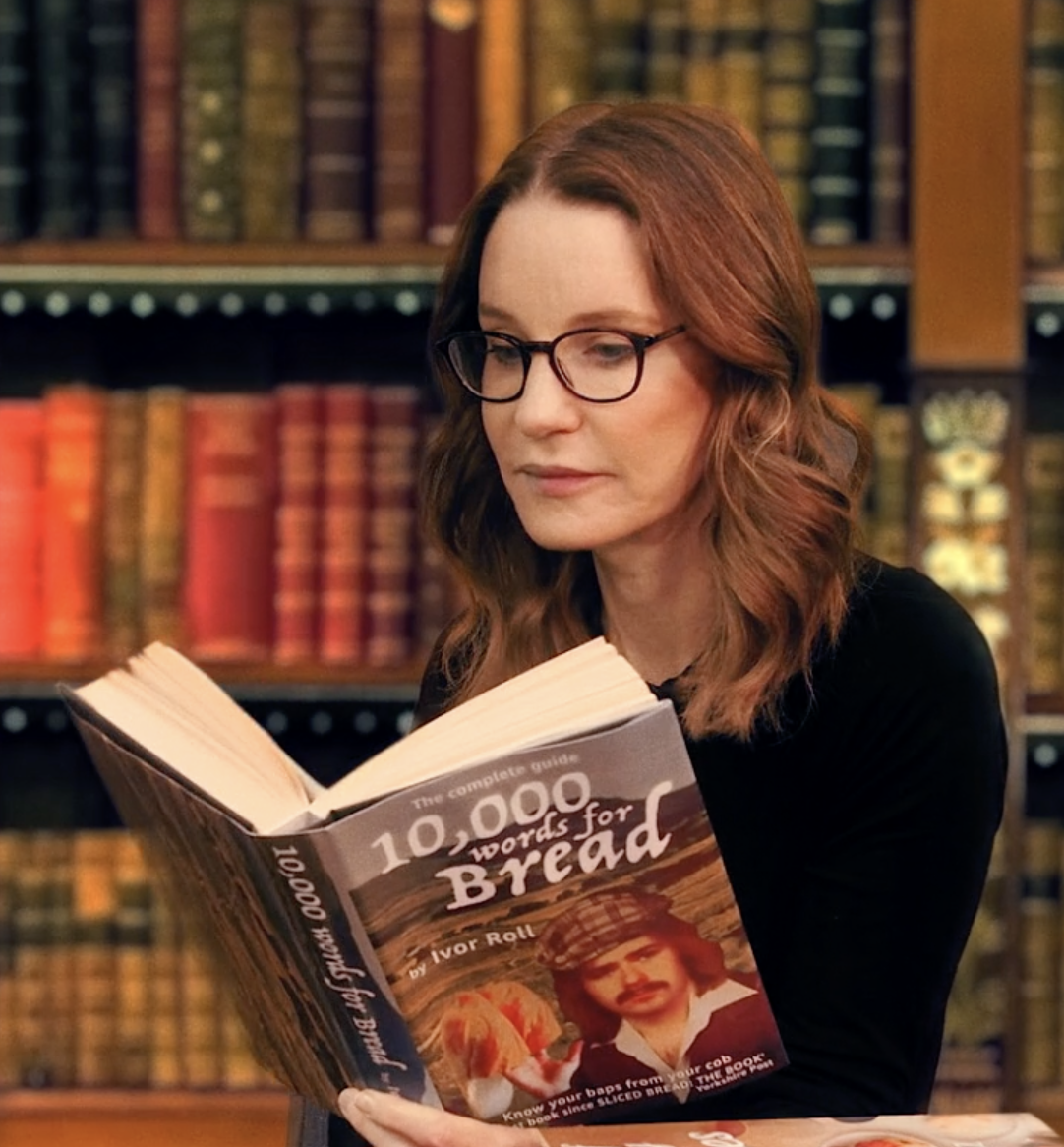
- Dent in 2020
- Born: Susan Francesca Dent; November 1964 (age 61–62); Woking, Surrey, England
- Education: Somerville College, Oxford (BA); Princeton University (MA)
- Occupations: Lexicographer, television presenter and author
- Known for: Countdown (1992–present)
- Spouse: Paul Atkins (sep. 2021)
- Children: 2

Susan Dent (born November 1964) is an English lexicographer, etymologist, and media personality. She has appeared in "Dictionary Corner" on the Channel 4 game show Countdown since 1992. She also appears on 8 Out of 10 Cats Does Countdown, a post-watershed comedy version of the show.

== Early life and education ==
Susan Dent was born in November 1964 in Woking, Surrey.

She was educated at the Marist Convent in Ascot, an independent Roman Catholic day school, with a term at Eton College to study for Oxbridge entrance exams. She went on to Somerville College, Oxford, where she graduated with a BA in modern languages. She then undertook a master's degree in German at Princeton University in the United States.

Upon graduation she spent a year in New York teaching German, until her visa expired and she returned to the UK.

== Career ==
Dent is well known as the resident lexicographer and adjudicator for the letters rounds on Channel 4's longest-running game show Countdown. She began working on Countdown in 1992 at the insistence of her boss at Oxford University Press (OUP). She had recently switched roles to work on compiling English dictionaries, having previously worked on bilingual dictionaries. At first she declined the Countdown offer, but her boss explained that her appearance on the show formed part of her OUP employment contract and she agreed to take the role. On each episode, she provides a brief commentary on the origin of a particular word or phrase. Dent is the longest-serving member of the show's current on-screen team, first appearing in 1992; she has since made more than 5,000 appearances. Dent also works on the spin-off show 8 Out of 10 Cats Does Countdown.

Dent appeared as herself in an episode of the BBC sitcom Not Going Out.

She presented Channel 4 web series Susie Dent's Guide to Swearing, which explored the etymology and history of select English swear words. She has also made an appearance on BBC entertainment show Would I Lie to You?. In 2018, she also appeared on five episodes of the panel show Richard Osman's House of Games.

In 2019, Dent launched the podcast Something Rhymes With Purple, co-hosted with her friend Gyles Brandreth; they followed this up with live theatre stage residencies using the same formula as their podcast.

In 2023, Dent embarked on a solo tour, The Secret Lives of Words.

She co-wrote a romantic radio drama with Peter Souter, Only One Word for Love, that was broadcast on BBC Radio 4 ahead of Valentine's Day in 2025.

Dent was a contestant on Taskmaster's New Year Treat in January 2026.

== Recognition and honours ==
Dent has been honorary vice-president of the Chartered Institute of Editing and Proofreading since 2016, as well as an honorary fellow and vice-president of the Chartered Institute of Linguists since 2023.

In June 2024 Dent was appointed Member of the Order of the British Empire (MBE) in the 2024 Birthday Honours for services to literature and to language.

== Published books ==
From 2003 to 2007, Dent was the author of a series of yearly Language Reports for the Oxford University Press. The first was simply titled The Language Report, and this was followed by Larpers and Shroomers (2004); Fanboys and Overdogs (2005); The Like, Language Report for Real (2006); and The Language Report: English on the Move 2000–2007 (2007). The format of this publication was revised for 2008 as an A–Z collection of new and newly resurrected words. It was published in October 2008 as Words of the Year (ISBN 9780199551996).

In 2005, the same publisher issued Winning Words (ISBN 0199198748), and in 2009, What Made the Crocodile Cry? 101 questions about the English language (ISBN 0199574154). Dent's book about dialects, How to Talk Like a Local (ISBN 1905211791), was published in March 2010.

Her first novel, Guilty by Definition, was published in August 2024.

List of published books
First published	Title	Pages	Publisher
November 2003	The Language Report: The Ultimate Record of What We're Saying and How We're Saying It	151	Oxford University Press
November 2004	Larpers and Shroomers: The Language Report	174	Oxford University Press
September 2005	Winning Words	32	Oxford University Press
January 2006	Fanboys and Overdogs	163	Oxford University Press
January 2007	The Like, Language Report for Real	176	Oxford University Press
December 2007	The Language Report: English on the Move 2000–2007	166	Oxford University Press
October 2008	Words of the Year	148	Oxford University Press
November 2008	How to Talk Like a Local: From Cockney to Geordie	256	Random House
October 2009	What Made the Crocodile Cry? 101 Questions About the English Language	159	Oxford University Press
August 2012	Brewer's Dictionary of Phrase and Fable (Editor)	1568	John Murray Learning
November 2013	Susie Dent's Weird Words	176	Scholastic Non-Fiction
October 2017	Dent's Modern Tribes: The Secret Languages of Britain	336	John Murray
October 2020	Word Perfect: Etymological Entertainment For Every Day of the Year	419	John Murray
October 2022	An Emotional Dictionary: Real Words For How You Feel	336	John Murray
September 2023	Interesting Stories about Curious Words	432	John Murray
October 2023	Roots of Happiness	128	Penguin Random House Children's UK
August 2024	Guilty by Definition	400	Zaffre
11th September 2025	Words for Life: To Boost Every Day of the Year	352	John Murray Press
August 2026	Death Writ Large		Zaffre

== Personal life ==
Dent was married to Paul Atkins, a teacher, and has two daughters. They separated in 2021. She is an Arsenal supporter.
