= Jim White (journalist) =

British journalist and presenter (born 1957)

Jim White (born 1957) is a British journalist and presenter. He attended Manchester Grammar School and studied English at Bristol University.

== Writing ==
White was a founding staff member at The Independent in 1986. Since leaving The Guardian in 2003, he has covered major sporting events for Daily Telegraph. A fervent supporter of Manchester United, he authors a regular column for fanzines United We Stand and The Telegraph. White also contributes articles to Yahoo! Eurosport.

He is also the author of You'll Win Nothing with Kids, a memoir about his experiences as an unsuccessful junior football coach.

== Broadcasting ==
White is a long-time contributor to BBC Radio 4 and BBC Radio 5 Live, including guest appearances as a pundit on Fighting Talk. He has also appeared on Sky, where he has written and presented documentaries on Jose Mourinho and Sven-Göran Eriksson. Previously, he presented a sports current affairs show, The Back Page, on STV.

== Personal life ==
White has two children. His son, Barney, is an actor known for acting opposite Ben Miller in Professor T. White also has a daughter, Ellie, who works as a comedian and actress.
