= Philip: The Final Portrait =

2021 nonfiction book by Gyles Brandreth

- Author: Gyles Brandreth
- Language: English
- Subject: Prince Philip, Duke of Edinburgh
- Genre: Biographical
- Publisher: Coronet Books
- Publication date: 27 April 2021
- Pages: 528
- ISBN: 978-1-444-76957-9
- OCLC: 1247947611
- Dewey Decimal: 791.45092

Philip: The Final Portrait is a 2021 book written by English writer and former politician Gyles Brandreth on the life of Prince Philip, Duke of Edinburgh. It also focuses on his marriage to Queen Elizabeth II, and his relationships with his family, friends, and the media.

The book is a revised and updated version of Brandreth's 2004 book, Philip and Elizabeth: Portrait of a Marriage. The new edition contains new content about the death of Prince Philip, and his legacy.

Speaking of the book, the author said "[…] it was a great privilege to know the Duke over so many years and remarkable to be given special access and help in writing his life story."

The book contains anecdotes, correspondence between the Duke and the author, pictures from the royal couple's collections, and other historical artefacts (such as an 11-year-old Princess Elizabeth's account of her parents' coronation).

The book was first published in the United Kingdom on 27 April 2021 by Coronet Books, an imprint of Hodder & Stoughton.
