= Public Opinion (TV series) =

British television panel game

Public Opinion was a television entertainment programme hosted by Gyles Brandreth, and produced by BBC Scotland.

The game involved six celebrities being faced with four words; the celebrities were asked what word best described one person in the group. The game was divided into four rounds; at the end of the game each celebrity made a decision as to who best represented all the four words. Gossip and revelations ensued until Brandreth revealed who 2,000 members of the general public thought was best represented by the four words.

The show was broadcast by BBC One from 6 September to 10 October 2004 for a total of 6 episodes.

Guest celebrities included Jim Bowen, Paul Daniels, Rhona Cameron, Uri Geller, David Soul, and Nick Bateman.
