= Wendy Holden (author, born 1965) =

British novelist

- Born: 12 June 1965 (age 61); Cleckheaton, West Riding of Yorkshire
- Occupation: Novelist
- Website: www.wendyholden.net

Wendy Holden (born 12 June 1965) is a British novelist. Having started in magazines, Holden became well-known for her best-selling women's fiction then, later, historical fiction.

Holden was born and raised in Cleckheaton, West Riding of Yorkshire. She attended Whitcliffe Mount School, and read English at Girton College, Cambridge, graduating from Cambridge University in the mid-1980s. Holden moved to London where she found work in the magazine business, eventually working for The Diplomat monthly, where she became an editor. From there, she moved on to The Sunday Times. One of her responsibilities at the title was ghostwriting a column on behalf of socialite Tara Palmer-Tomkinson, an experience which Holden says influenced her first novel, Simply Divine.

Simply Divine was published in 1999, and Holden went on to write a series of novels, most of which were bestsellers, and which she happily describes as "chick lit" and "supermarket novels". After over a decade focused on the genre, Holden turned her attention to historical fiction. Her first novel in the genre, The Governess, told the story of Marion Crawford, governess to the future Queen Elizabeth II. Her subsequent novel, The Duchess, released in 2021, focused on the life of Wallis Simpson. Her final novel in the trilogy was about Diana, Princess of Wales.

As of 2015 Holden is married, has two children, and lives in the Derbyshire Peak District.

== Publications ==
=== Comedies ===
- Simply Divine. London: Headline. 1999. ISBN 978-0-7472-2278-1.
- Bad Heir Day. London: Headline. 2001. ISBN 978-0-7472-2279-8.
- Pastures Nouveaux. London: Headline. 2001. ISBN 978-0-7472-7252-6. (published as Farm Fatale in the United States)
- Fame Fatale. London: Headline. 2002. ISBN 978-0-7472-7251-9. (published as Gossip Hound in the United States)
- Azur Like It. London: Headline. 2003. ISBN 978-0-7553-0065-5.
- The Wives of Bath. London: Headline. 2005. ISBN 978-0-7553-0067-9.
- The School for Husbands. London: Headline Review. 2006. ISBN 978-0-7553-2508-5.
- Filthy Rich. London: Headline Review. 2008. ISBN 978-0-7553-2511-5.
- Beautiful People. London: Headline Review. 2009. ISBN 978-0-7553-4254-9.
- Gallery Girl. London: Headline Review. 2010. ISBN 978-0-7553-4258-7.
- Marrying Up. London: Headline Review. 2011. ISBN 978-0-7553-4262-4.
- Gifted and Talented. London: Headline Review. 2012. ISBN 978-0-7553-8525-6.
- Wild and Free. London: Headline. 2015. ISBN 978-0-7553-8531-7.
- Honeymoon Suite. London: Headline. 2015. ISBN 978-0-7553-8533-1.

=== Laura Lake trilogy ===
- Laura Lake and the Hipster Weddings. Head of Zeus. 2017. ISBN 978-1-78497-755-9.
- Last of the Summer Moët. Head of Zeus. 2018. ISBN 978-1-78497-758-0.
- A View to a Kilt. Head of Zeus. 2019. ISBN 978-1-78497-762-7.

=== Windsor trilogy ===
- The Royal Governess: A Novel of Queen Elizabeth II's Childhood. Berkley. 2020. ISBN 978-0-593-10132-2.
- The Duchess: A Novel of Wallis Simpson. Welbeck. 2021. ISBN 978-1-78739-624-1.
- The Princess. Welbeck. 2023. ISBN 978-1-78739-758-3.
