= Gyles Brandreth =

British actor, broadcaster and writer (born 1948)

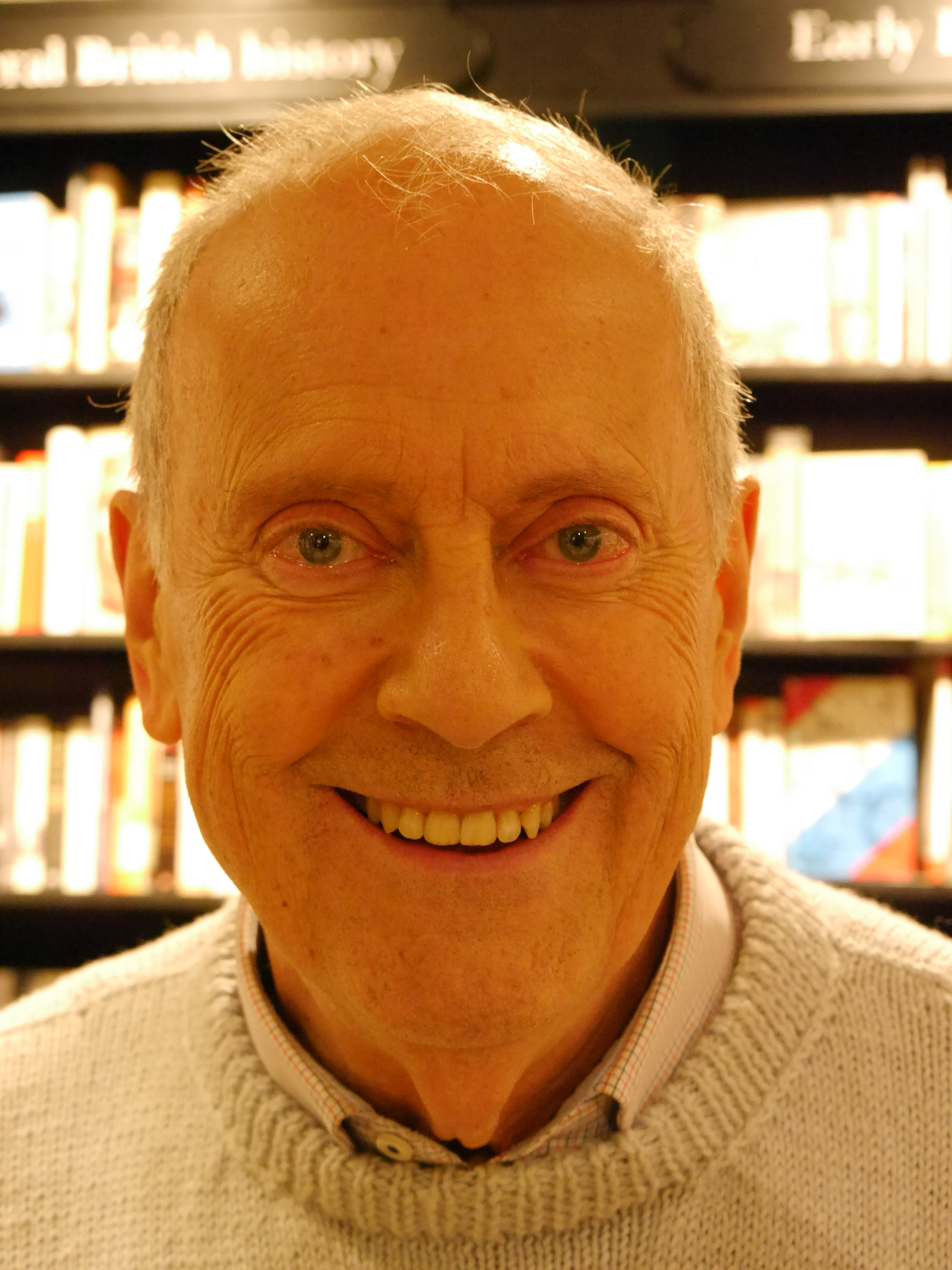
- Brandreth in 2022

Chancellor of the University of Chester
- In office 17 March 2017 – 6 November 2025
- Vice-Chancellor: Timothy Wheeler; Eunice Simmons
- Preceded by: The Duke of Westminster
- Succeeded by: Dame Jenny Harries

Lord Commissioner of the Treasury
- In office 12 December 1996 – 2 May 1997
- Prime Minister: John Major
- Preceded by: Michael Bates
- Succeeded by: Graham Allen

Assistant Whip
- In office 25 November 1995 – 12 December 1996
- Prime Minister: John Major
- Preceded by: Liam Fox
- Succeeded by: Matthew Carrington

Member of Parliament for City of Chester
- In office 9 April 1992 – 8 April 1997
- Preceded by: Peter Morrison
- Succeeded by: Christine Russell

Personal details
- Born: Gyles Daubeney Brandreth; 8 March 1948 (age 78) Wuppertal, Germany
- Party: Conservative
- Spouse: Michèle Brown (m. 1973)
- Children: 3 (including Aphra)
- Relatives: Benjamin Brandreth (ancestor)
- Education: New College, Oxford (BA)
- Occupation: Broadcaster; writer; politician; television presenter; theatre producer; publisher
- Brandreth's voice from the BBC programme Desert Island Discs, 14 January 2011

Gyles Daubeney Brandreth (born 8 March 1948) is a British broadcaster, writer and former politician. He has worked as a television presenter, theatre producer, journalist, author and publisher.

Brandreth was a presenter for TV-am's Good Morning Britain in the 1980s, and has regularly featured on Channel 4's game show Countdown and the BBC's The One Show. On radio, he has appeared on the BBC Radio 4 programme Just a Minute.

In 1992, Brandreth was elected as a Conservative member of Parliament (MP) for the City of Chester constituency. Representing Chester in the House of Commons until his defeat at the 1997 general election, Brandreth then resumed his career in the media. He has written fiction and non-fiction books.

== Early life ==
Brandreth was born in 1948 at Wuppertal, Germany, where his father, Charles Brandreth (1910–1982), was serving as a legal officer with the Allied Control Commission. His mother, Alice, née Addison, (1914–2010), became a pioneer in remedial teaching for dyslexic children. His great-great-great-grandfather was Benjamin Brandreth, descended from Thomas Brandreth of Ormskirk (1723–1791) via a cadet branch and a cousin of Admiral Sir Thomas Brandreth. He is also a descendant of Jeremiah Brandreth.

When Brandreth was three, his parents returned to London, where he was educated at the Lycée Français de Londres, then Bedales School in Hampshire, becoming friends with Simon Cadell.

Brandreth read Modern History and Modern Languages at New College, Oxford. While there, he directed the Oxford University Dramatic Society and was elected President of the Oxford Union in Michaelmas term 1969, and was a regular contributor to the undergraduate magazine Isis. He was described in a contemporaneous publication as "Oxford's Lord High Everything Else". Christopher Hitchens suggested that Brandreth "set out to make himself into a Ken Tynan. Wore a cloak".

== Television ==
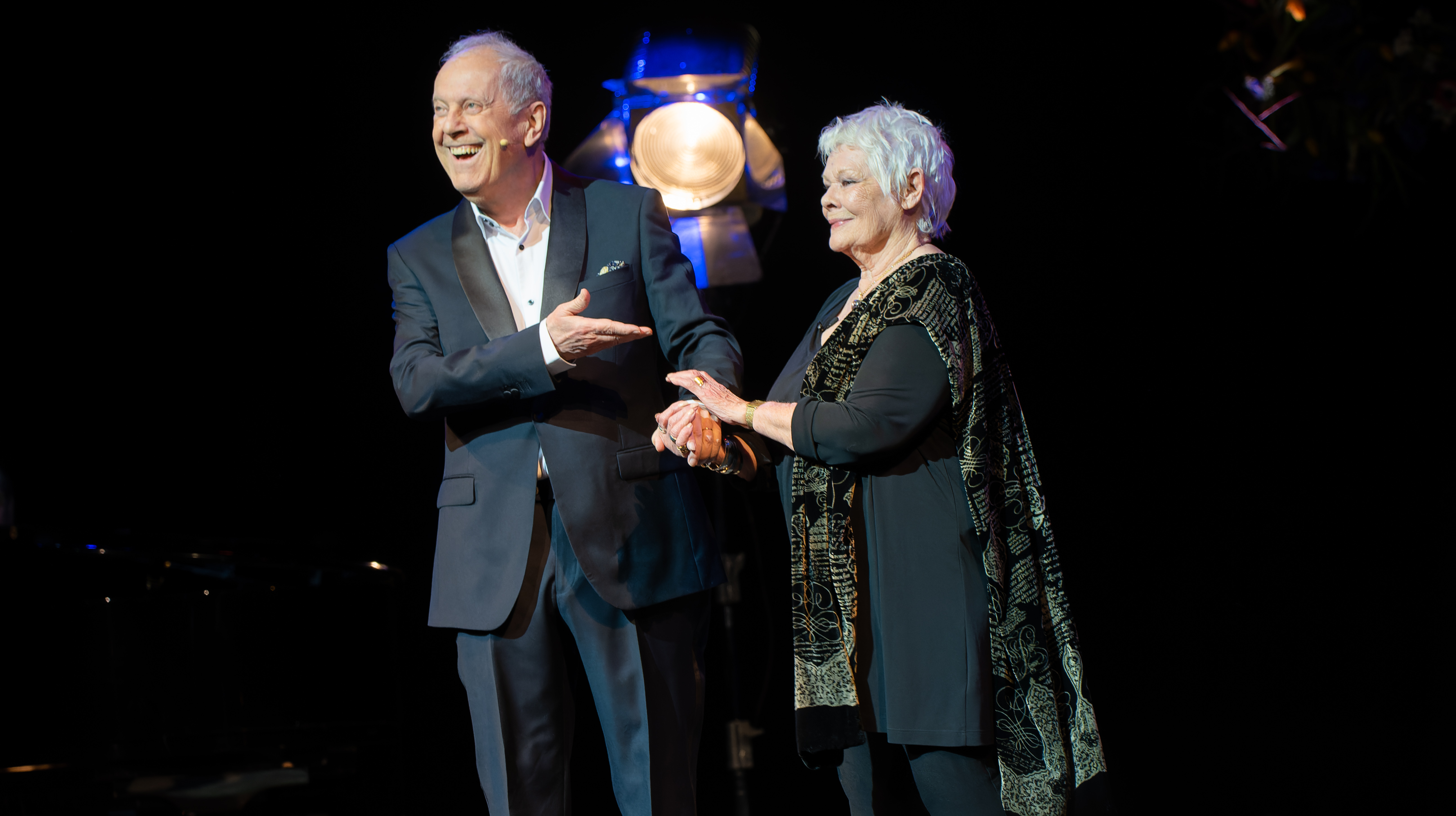
Brandreth with Judi Dench at the London Palladium in 2023

Brandreth has appeared in the "Dictionary Corner" on the game show Countdown more than 300 times, including Carol Vorderman's final edition in 2008, making more appearances than any other guest. He appeared on TV-am's Good Morning Britain. He has appeared regularly in recent years on ITV's This Morning.

In 1989, he presented, with his wife, Michèle, Discovering Gardens, a documentary television series that explored public gardens across South West England while speaking to the people that created and maintained them.

Brandreth hosted the short-lived game show Public Opinion in 2004. In 2006, he appeared on the television series That Mitchell and Webb Look, on the fictional game show "Numberwang", satirising his appearances in Countdown's "Dictionary Corner". In 2007, he guest-starred in the Doctor Who audio play I.D. From July to August 2009, he hosted the game show Knowitalls on BBC Two. In April 2010, he appeared on BBC Radio 4's Vote Now Show. He made a cameo appearance as himself in Channel 4 sitcom The IT Crowd, in the episode "The Final Countdown", again as a guest in Countdown's "Dictionary Corner".

A frequent guest on BBC television panel shows, he has appeared on ten episodes of QI and nine episodes of Have I Got News for You. He has appeared in episodes of Channel 5's The Gadget Show, and is a contributor to the BBC's early evening programme The One Show.

He appeared on Room 101 in 2005, while Paul Merton was host, successfully banishing the Royal Variety Performance and the British honours system into Room 101, declaring that he would never accept an honour himself. In 2013, Brandreth clarified his position, stating that he had "no fundamental objection to the honours system", and that he selected the honours system for Room 101 because he could "tell funny stories about it".

In October 2019, Brandreth appeared in series 3 of Richard Osman's House of Games, winning two of the five episodes.

Also in 2019, he appeared on series 1 of Celebrity Gogglebox alongside Sheila Hancock. In 2020 and 2021, Brandreth returned for series 2 and 3, alongside Maureen Lipman. In 2022, he appeared in series 4 with Joanna Lumley and Carol Vorderman. In 2023, he returned with Lumley for series 5, as well as Susie Dent.

In 2020, Brandreth and actor Sheila Hancock replaced Timothy West and Prunella Scales in a two-episode series of Great Canal Journeys, travelling down the River Thames. In the first episode West gave the two novice canal boaters a crash course in barging. They navigated the Staffordshire Waterways in 2021 for another two-episode series.

On 16 October 2021, Brandreth appeared alongside Anne Hegerty as a celebrity contestant on the ITV show Beat the Chasers—described as Gogglebox in celebrity guise—in aid of Great Ormond Street Hospital to support Claire Windsor, Countess of Ulster and her fellow clinicians' work. On 24 October 2022, Brandreth appeared on Bargain Hunt: BBC 100th Birthday Special to commemorate the BBC's 100th Anniversary. His team mate was Tony Blackburn.

== Radio ==
Brandreth has presented programmes on London's LBC radio at various times since its launch in 1973. He has frequently appeared on BBC Radio 4's comedy panel game Just a Minute. On several episodes of Radio 4's political programme The Westminster Hour, Brandreth has shared his thoughts on how to make the most of being a government minister. From 2003 to 2005, Brandreth hosted the Radio 4 comedy panel game Whispers.

In 2006, Brandreth appeared in the Radio 4 comedy programme Living with the Enemy, which he co-wrote with comedian Nick Revell and in which they appear as a former Conservative government minister and a former comedian. In 2010, he broadcast a Radio 4 documentary about his great-great-great-grandfather, Benjamin Brandreth, the inventor of a medicine called "Brandreth's Pills". For a period, he was the host of the Radio 4 comedy panel show Wordaholics; the programme first aired on 20 February 2012. He appeared on the Radio 4 programme The Museum of Curiosity in August 2017, to which he donated a button that was once owned by a famous actor.

== Podcasts ==
In April 2019, Brandreth began co-hosting a podcast, Something Rhymes with Purple, alongside lexicographer Susie Dent. The podcast discussed aspects of the English language such as historic or unusual words and their origins, as well as the origins of popular phrases and sayings. The podcast ended in July 2024.

In September 2023, Brandreth began hosting another podcast, Rosebud with Gyles Brandreth, in which he interviews famous people about "their first memories and first experiences". Interviewees include Judi Dench, Björn Ulvaeus, Miriam Margolyes, Keir Starmer, and Bill Wyman.

== Writing ==
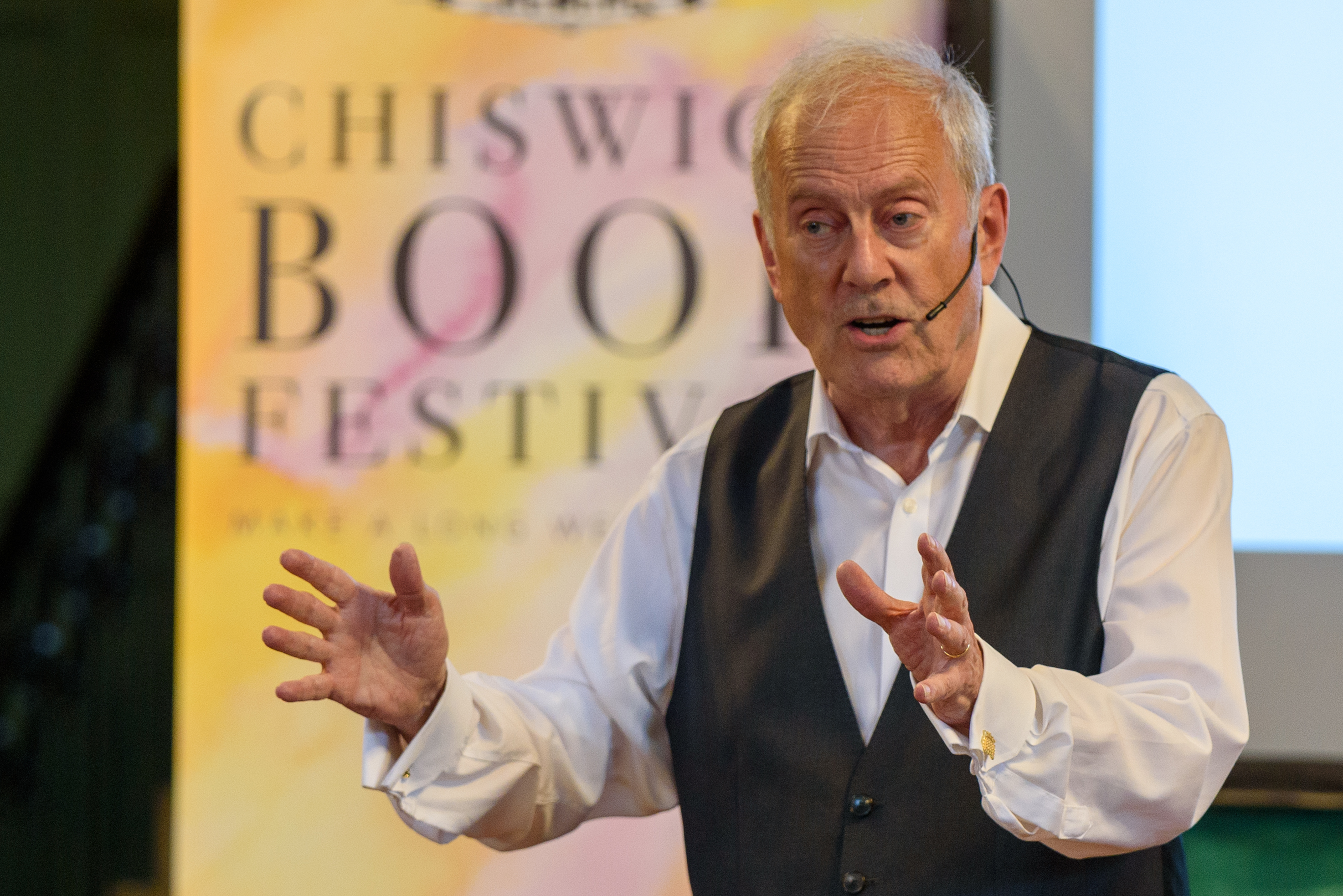
Brandreth at the Chiswick Book Festival

Since the 1970s, Brandreth has written books for adults and children about Scrabble, words, puzzles and jokes; he was also a regular contributor to Games & Puzzles magazine. He wrote an authorised biography of actor John Gielgud, and lipogrammic reworks of Shakespeare. In the 1980s, Brandreth wrote scripts for Dear Ladies, a television programme featuring Hinge & Bracket. Brandreth created the stage show Zipp!, which enjoyed success at the Edinburgh Festival and had a short run in the West End.

In 1999, he published diaries chronicling his days as a politician between 1990 and 1997, called Breaking the Code.

In September 2004, Brandreth's book on the marriage of Queen Elizabeth II and Prince Philip, Duke of Edinburgh, Philip and Elizabeth: Portrait of a Marriage, was published. In July 2005, he published a second book on the royal family, Charles and Camilla: Portrait of a Love Affair, which concerns the three-decade love affair between the then-Prince Charles and Camilla Parker Bowles.

In 2021, following the death of Prince Philip, Duke of Edinburgh, Brandreth wrote: "The Duke showed me great friendliness over 40 years but royalty offer you friendliness, not friendship, and you have to remember the difference".

Brandreth has written a series of seven works of historical fiction called The Oscar Wilde Murder Mysteries, casting Oscar Wilde as working with both Robert Sherard and Arthur Conan Doyle.

Brandreth has written and toured in a number of comedic one-man shows, including The One-to-One Show in 2010–2011, Looking for Happiness in 2013–2014 and Word Power in 2015–2016.

Brandreth has written a book entitled Have You Eaten Grandma?, about the English language and correct grammar.

== Politics ==
Brandreth served as a Conservative MP, representing the City of Chester, from 1992 to 1997. In 1992, he introduced a Plain Language Bill, to simplify language used in contracts, under the Ten Minute Rule. However, it was objected to at Second Reading and was dropped. He then proposed a private member's bill, which became law as the Marriage Act 1994, allowing civil marriages to be solemnized in certain "approved premises". In 1995, he was appointed to junior ministerial office as a lord commissioner of the Treasury, with his role being essentially that of a whip.

Brandreth broadcast reminiscences of his parliamentary career on BBC radio as Brandreth on Office and The Brandreth Rules in 2001, 2003 and 2005.

In August 2014, Brandreth was one of 200 public figures who were signatories to a letter to The Guardian opposing Scottish independence from the UK in the run-up to the 2014 Scottish independence referendum. In May 2016, Brandreth told The Spectator that he was likely to vote Remain in the 2016 United Kingdom European Union membership referendum. In 2019, Brandreth confirmed that, while he had voted Remain, he accepted the referendum result to leave, saying that the government now had to "get Brexit done".

== Gyles & George knitwear ==
Brandreth is known for the colourful, humorous, novelty jumpers he has designed and has worn throughout his career. He has stated on the BBC that "it's all I'm really known for". Collaborating with artist and knitwear designer George Hostler (1939–2018), Brandreth created hundreds of jumper designs that appear in books he and Hostler authored and produced under their knitwear label, Gyles & George.

Brandreth devotes a room in his London home to jumpers, and claims to have one for almost every occasion. To name just a few examples: he has a knitted jumper emblazoned with a green frog that he has worn for appointments with Princes (Philip and Charles); on other royal occasions, he has worn sweaters featuring corgis and crowns. He has appeared on TV to talk about rail strikes with a jumper displaying a steam locomotive, and wore a sweater with the words "The End" on the day Boris Johnson resigned. He also has a Scrabble-themed jumper, which he sports as President of the Association of British Scrabble Players.

To strike a more serious note, he wore lounge suits rather than novelty jumpers when serving in Parliament, though he has stated: "The first time I spoke in the [House of] Commons, I heard John Prescott on the bench opposite me muttering 'woolly jumpers ha ha ha'. He could see I was thrown and he carried on. Eventually, I had to pause and point out to Mr Prescott (the Honourable Member for Kingston upon Hull East) that the joy of a woolly jumper is that you can take it off at will. Whereas the blight of a woolly mind is that you're lumbered with it for life".

In 2020, Brandreth partnered with American designer Jack Carlson to revive the label for the 21st century, with Gyles & George joining Carlson's collective of brands, Blazer Group. They have collaborated to re-release many of Brandreth's original designs, including a jumper with the words "I'm a Luxury" across the front, famously worn by Diana, Princess of Wales, and another featuring the words "What the **** is going on?" (the back reads: "Don't ask me"). They have also released a popular collection of sweaters themed around the signs of the Zodiac.

Aside from Brandreth himself, the brand's models and prominent customers have included Joanna Lumley, Floella Benjamin, Hugh Bonneville, Jane Asher, Elton John, Pete Davidson, Ziwe Fumudoh, Blanca Miro, Dwyane Wade, Keith Richards and Diana, Princess of Wales.

In 2023, the Petersfield Museum opened an exhibition dedicated to Gyles & George and Brandreth's personal collection of jumpers.

== Other activities ==
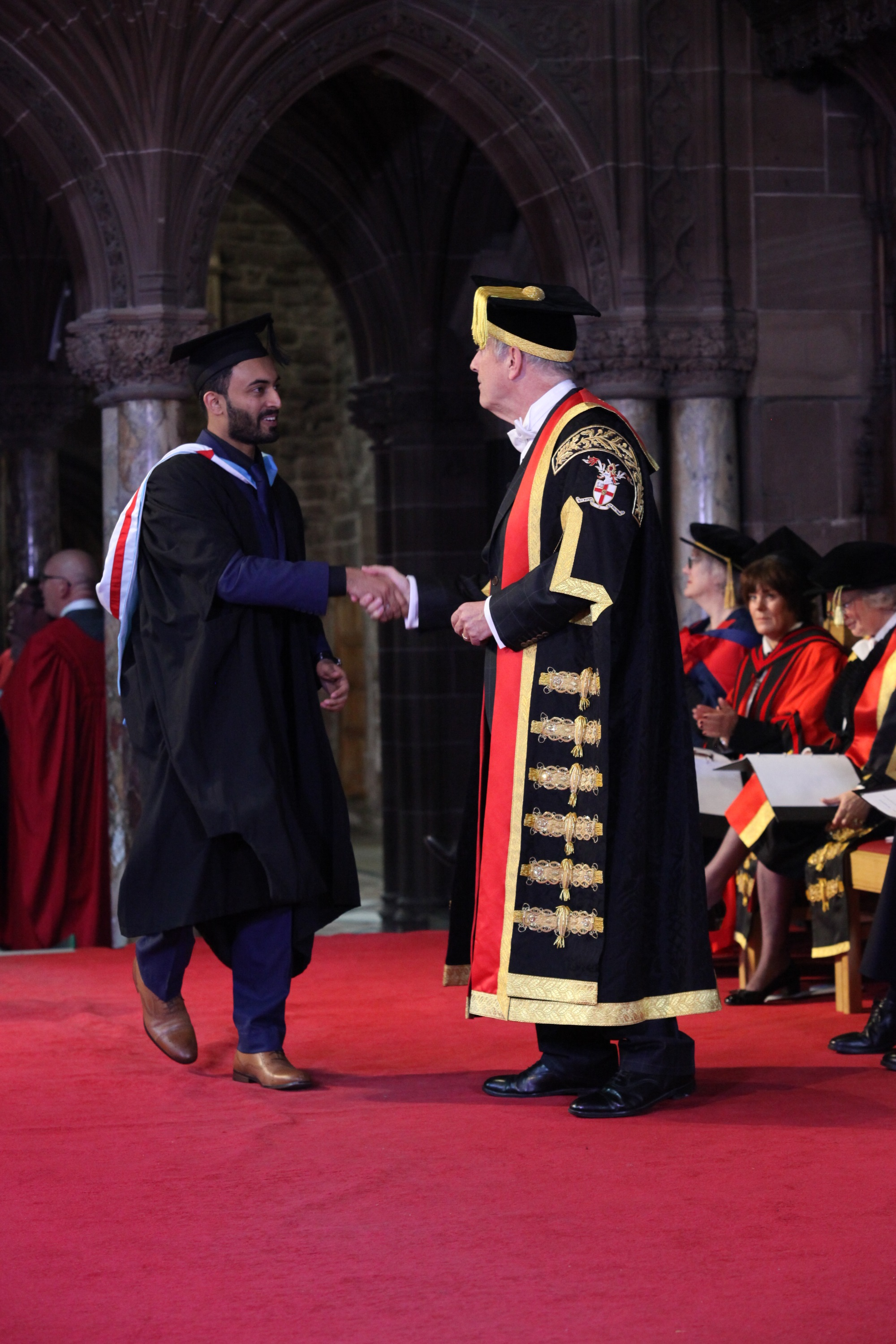
Brandreth as Chancellor of the University of Chester awarding degrees at the 2017 graduation ceremony in Chester Cathedral

Brandreth is a former European Monopoly champion. He was also an Honorary President of the Association of British Scrabble Players, having organised the first British National Scrabble Championship in 1971.

In 1987, Brandreth kissed Cheryl Baker onscreen for three minutes and 33 seconds, longer than the then-record longest onscreen kiss.

Brandreth is an after-dinner speaker and held the world record for the longest continuous after-dinner speech, twelve-and-a-half hours, done as a charity stunt. With his wife, he founded a teddy bear museum at Stratford-upon-Avon, which after 18 years relocated to the Polka Theatre in Wimbledon, London, before moving in 2016 to its current location at Newby Hall, Yorkshire. He is a Patron of the National Piers Society and Vice-President of charity Fields in Trust (formerly the National Playing Fields Association).

In 2014, Brandreth received the honorary degree of Doctor of Letters (Hon DLitt) from the University of Chester. In December 2016, he was named as the University of Chester's chancellor, taking office in March 2017.

Since 2015, Brandreth has served as President of the Oscar Wilde Society, which was founded in 1990.

In August and September 2017, Brandreth, his son Benet and daughter-in-law Kosha Engler staged a very truncated (90 minute, instead of a more usual three hours) production of Hamlet at the Park Theatre in Finsbury Park, London. Directed by Simon Evans and David Aula, Benet Brandreth plays Prince Hamlet, with Gyles and Engler playing another four or five characters each. Brandreth has released a recording of the production on YouTube.

== Personal life ==
Brandreth met Michèle Brown at Oxford. They married at Marylebone Register Office on 8 June 1973, witnessed by actor Simon Cadell, his best friend from school. They have a son and two daughters, and have lived in Barnes, London, since 1986.

Brandreth was a pescatarian in the past. He currently promotes a Mediterranean diet. He stopped drinking alcohol in 1997 to lose weight.

== Selected bibliography ==
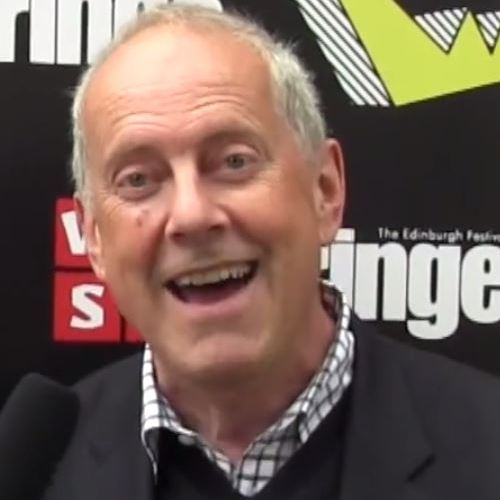
Waffle TV interviewing Brandreth at the Edinburgh Festival Fringe 2013

=== Non-fiction ===
- Created in Captivity (1972), a study of prison reform
- The Funniest Man on Earth (1974), a biography of Dan Leno
- Pears Book of Words, foreword by Robert Burchfield (1979) ISBN 0-7207-1-186-X
- The Joy of Lex: How to Have Fun with 860,341,500 Words (1980), ISBN 0-688-01397-X
- The Complete Home Entertainer (1981) ISBN 0-7091-9145-6, 978-0-7091-9145-2
- Everyman's Indoor Games (1981), ISBN 0-460-04456-7
- The World's Best Indoor Games (1981), ISBN 978-0394524771
- 871 Famous Last Words, and Put-downs, Insults, Squelches, Compliments, Rejoinders, Epigrams, and Epitaphs of Famous People (1982) ISBN 0-5173-8349-7, 978-0-5173-8349-0
- The Book of Mistaikes (1982), ISBN 0-7088-2194-4
- Wordplay (1982), ISBN 0-7278-2017-6, 978-0-7278-2017-4
- John Gielgud: A Celebration (1984) ISBN 0-907-51638-6
- The Scrabble Brand Puzzle Book (1984), ISBN 0-671-50536-X
- The Book of Solo Games (1984), ISBN 091174553X
- A Guide to Playing the Scrabble Brand Crossword Game (1985), ISBN 0-671-50652-8
- Wit Knits: Lively and Original Hand-Knitting Designs (1985), ISBN 978-0-0021-8168-6 (with George Hostler)
- The Great Book of Optical Illusions (1985), ISBN 0-8069-6258-5
- Everyman's Classic Puzzles (1986), ISBN 0-4600-2466-3
- The Scrabble Companion (1988), ISBN 0-09-172698-0 (with Darryl Francis)
- Knitability: Fun Knits for all the Family (1988), ISBN 978-0-0041-1-1988 (with Linda O'Brien)
- World Championship Scrabble (1992), ISBN 0-550-19028-7 (with Darryl Francis)
- Under the Jumper: Autobiographical Excursions (1993). ISBN 0-86051-894-9
- Breaking the Code: Westminster Diaries, May 1990 – May 1997 (1999), ISBN 0-297-64311-8
- Brief Encounters: Meetings with Remarkable People (2001), ISBN 1-902301-95-1
- John Gielgud: An Actor's Life (2001), ISBN 0-7509-2690-2
- The Biggest Kids' Joke Book Ever! (2002), ISBN 0-233-05062-0
- The Joy of Lex: An Amazing and Amusing Z to A and A to Z of Words (2002), ISBN 1-86105-399-1
- The Word Book (2002), ISBN 1-86105-398-3
- Philip and Elizabeth: Portrait of a Marriage (2004), ISBN 0-7126-6103-4
- Charles and Camilla: Portrait of a Love Affair (2005), ISBN 1-84413-845-3
- Something Sensational to Read in the Train (2010), ISBN 978-0719520624
- The 7 Secrets of Happiness (2013) ISBN 978-1780722047
- Word Play (2015) ISBN 978-1-473-62029-2
- Messing About in Quotes (2018) ISBN 978-0-19-881318-7
- Novelty Knits: 35 Fun & Fabulous Jumpers (2019), ISBN 978-0-8578-3-8476 (with Saethryd Brandreth)
- The Oxford Book of Theatrical Anecdotes (2020) ISBN 978-0-19-874958-5
- Philip: The Final Portrait (2021) ISBN 978-1-44-476960-9
- Odd Boy Out (2021) ISBN 978-0-24-148371-8
- Elizabeth: An Intimate Portrait (2022) ISBN 978-0-24-158258-9
- Somewhere, a Boy and a Bear: A. A. Milne and the Creation of 'Winnie-the-Pooh' (2025) ISBN 9781250429902

=== Fiction ===
- Here Comes Golly (1979). ISBN 978-0-7207-1098-4
- Who is Nick Saint? (1996). ISBN 978-0-3168-7979-8
- Venice Midnight (1999). ISBN 0-7515-2658-4
- Oscar Wilde and the Candlelight Murders (2007), (American title: Oscar Wilde and a Death of No Importance). ISBN 978-0-7195-6930-2
- Oscar Wilde and the Ring of Death (2008), (American title: Oscar Wilde and a Game Called Murder). ISBN 978-0719569609
- Oscar Wilde and the Dead Man's Smile (2009). ISBN 978-1416534853
- Oscar Wilde and the Nest of Vipers (2010), (American title: Oscar Wilde and the Vampire Murders). ISBN 978-1-4391-5369-7
- Oscar Wilde and the Vatican Murders (2011). ISBN 978-1-4391-5374-1
- Oscar Wilde and the Murders at Reading Gaol (2012). ISBN 978-1-4391-5376-5
- Jack the Ripper – Case Closed (2017). ISBN 978-1-4721-5232-9, (American title: Oscar Wilde and the Return of Jack the Ripper (2019). ISBN 978-1-64313-021-7)

Parliament of the United Kingdom
Preceded by Peter Morrison	Member of Parliament for the City of Chester; 1992–1997	Succeeded by Christine Russell
Academic offices
Preceded by Gerald Grosvenor	Chancellor of the University of Chester; 2017–present	Incumbent
