= James Cuff =

British biophysicist

Dr. James Andrew Cuff
- Citizenship: United States of America
- Education: Christ Church, Oxford
- Spouse: Michele Clamp
- Scientific career
- Fields: Molecular Biophysics; High Performance Computing
- Workplaces: MIT; Harvard University; Broad Institute; European Bioinformatics Institute; University of Oxford; University of Manchester
- Thesis: Protein Structure Prediction (1999)
- Doctoral advisor: Geoff Barton

James Andrew Cuff, (born Preston, Lancashire) is a British biophysicist. Cuff has held leadership positions at MIT, Harvard University, the Broad Institute, The Wellcome Trust Sanger Institute and the European Bioinformatics Institute.

== Education ==
Cuff holds a PhD in protein structure prediction from the University of Oxford, and holds a Bachelor of Science in Chemistry from The University of Manchester.

== Research ==
Cuff's research investigates genomics, protein structure prediction, bioinformatics and High Performance Computing (HPC). Cuff worked as a part of teams that completed the first simultaneous genome analysis of twenty nine mammals, the refinement of the human gene count, and the first bivalent chromatin structures to be found in embryonic stem cells. In addition, Cuff has contributed to several large-scale bioinformatics and computational biology projects including Ensembl, Jalview, and the first online consensus secondary structure prediction algorithm JPred. He supported the resolution of the mouse, dog and monodelphis genomes and the early ENCODE project.

Based on early work with computer clusters, Cuff has aided with the design and architecture of the Massachusetts Green High Performance Computing Center, a multimillion-dollar data centre project between Harvard University, MIT, Boston University, Northeastern University, and University of Massachusetts. Cuff is also a co-developer on a popular open source authentication method called JAuth.

In 2022, MIT created a new Office of Research Computing and Data and Cuff returned from early retirement as its inaugural Executive Director, continuing his earlier work with the Massachusetts Green High Performance Computing Center.

== Most cited papers ==
- Bernstein BE, Mikkelsen TS, Xie X, Kamal M, Huebert DJ, Cuff J, Fry B, Meissner A, Wernig M, Plath K, Jaenisch R. A bivalent chromatin structure marks key developmental genes in embryonic stem cells. Cell. 2006 Apr 21;125(2):315-26. According to Google Scholar, this article has been cited 5166 times
- Cuff JA, Barton GJ. Application of multiple sequence alignment profiles to improve protein secondary structure prediction. Proteins: Structure, Function, and Bioinformatics. 2000 Aug 15;40(3):502-11. According to Google Scholar, it has been cited 960 times.
- EK, Jaffe DB, Kamal M, Clamp M, Chang JL, Kulbokas EJ, Zody MC, Mauceli E. Genome sequence, comparative analysis and haplotype structure of the domestic dog. Nature. 2005 Dec;438(7069):803-19. According to Google Scholar, it has been cited 2543 times.
- Cuff JA, Clamp ME, Siddiqui AS, Finlay M, Barton GJ. JPred: a consensus secondary structure prediction server. Bioinformatics. 1998 Jan 1;14(10):892-3. According to Google Scholar, it has been cited 1218 times.
- Cuff JA, Barton GJ. Evaluation and improvement of multiple sequence methods for protein secondary structure prediction. Proteins: Structure, Function, and Bioinformatics. 1999 Mar 1;34(4):508-19. According to Google Scholar, it has been cited 776 times.
