= Jelena Vučković =

Serbian-born American physicist

- Education: Caltech
- Known for: Contributions to experimental nano and quantum photonics
- Awards: Zeiss Research Award, Zeiss (2025); Member, National Academy of Sciences (2023); Vannevar Bush Faculty Fellow, US Department of Defense (2022); Mildred Dresselhaus Lecturer, MIT (2021); James P. Gordon Memorial Speaker, Optical Society of America (2020); A. F. Harvey Engineering Research Prize, Institution of Engineering and Technology (2019); Distinguished Scholar, Max Planck Institute of Quantum Optics (MPQ) (2019); Fellow, Institute of Electrical and Electronics Engineers. (2018); Fellow, Optical Society of America (2015); Fellow, American Physical Society (2015)
- Scientific career
- Workplaces: Stanford University
- Thesis: Photonic crystal structures for efficient localization or extraction of light (2002)
- Doctoral advisor: Axel Scherer
- Doctoral students: Hatice Altug, Dirk Englund
- Website: web.stanford.edu/~jela/

Jelena Vučković is a Serbian-born American scientist, and a Jensen Huang Professor of Global Leadership, Professor of Electrical Engineering, and by courtesy of Applied Physics at Stanford University. She served as Fortinet Founders Chair of the Department of Electrical Engineering at Stanford University from August 2021 through June 2023. Vučković leads the Nanoscale and Quantum Photonics (NQP) Lab, and is a faculty member of the Ginzton Lab, PULSE Institute, SIMES Institute, and Bio-X at Stanford. She was the inaugural director of the Q-FARM initiative (Quantum Fundamentals, ARchitecture and Machines). She is a Member of the National Academy of Sciences, an External Scientific Member of the Max Planck Institute of Quantum Optics, and a Fellow of The Optical Society, the American Physical Society and the Institute of Electrical and Electronics Engineers.

Vučković's research interests include nanophotonics, quantum information technologies, quantum optics, photonics inverse design, nonlinear optics, optoelectronics, cavity QED.

Vučković is the Lead editor for Physical Review Applied.

== Early life and education ==
Jelena Vučković was born in Niš, Serbia. Her father was a high school professor. Her mother worked in sales for a big glass factory. She studied at the University of Niš, where she also worked as a Teaching Assistant for two years before moving to Australia. She received her M.S. (1997) and PhD (2002) in Electrical Engineering from the California Institute of Technology (Caltech). In 2002, she was a postdoctoral scholar in the Applied Physics Department at Stanford. She became Assistant Professor in the Electrical Engineering Department in 2003.

== Career and research ==
Vučković is the Jensen Huang Professor in Global Leadership, Professor of Electrical Engineering, and by courtesy of Applied Physics at Stanford University. She is the lead/principal investigator the NQP Lab at Stanford, and is a faculty member of the Ginzton Lab, PULSE, SPRC, SystemX, and Bio-X.

Her PhD advisees include Ilya Fushman (PhD 2008), and she and Fushman were among lead authors on a quantum computing paper published in Nature in 2007 and Science in 2008.

Other PhD advisees include Andrei Faraon (PhD 2009), MIT professor Dirk Englund (PhD 2008), Harvard professor Kiyoul Yang, and Hatice Altug (PhD 2006), professor at the Swiss Federal Institute of Technology Lausanne.

As of 2018, Vuckovic's research areas include: nanophotonics, quantum information, quantum technology, quantum optics, Integrated quantum photonics, photonics inverse design, nonlinear optics, optoelectronics, and cavity QED.

Vučković's lab invented a software suite called Spins. Spins automates the design of arbitrary nanophotonic devices by leveraging gradient-based optimization techniques that can explore a large space of possible designs. The resulting devices have higher efficiencies, smaller footprints, and novel functionalities., Vuckovic is a cofounder and an advisory board member of Spins Photonics Inc, the company commercializing photonics inverse design. Vučković holds 20 patents.

Vučković was the "Fortinet Founders" chair of the Stanford Department of Electrical Engineering from August 2021 – June 2023, and lead researcher of the Nanoscale and Quantum Photonics (NQP) lab.

== Awards and honors ==
- Presidential Early Career Award for Scientists and Engineers (PECASE), (2006)
- Humboldt Prize (2010)
- Marko V. Jaric award for outstanding achievements in physics (2012)
- Hans Fischer Senior Fellow, Institute for Advanced Studies, Technical University of Munich, Germany (2013)
- Fellow, American Physical Society (2015)
- Fellow, The Optical Society (2015)
- Fellow, Institute of Electrical and Electronics Engineers, (2018)
- Distinguished Scholar, Max Planck Institute for Quantum Optics, (2019)
- Recipient, IET A F Harvey Prize, (2019)
- Recipient, James P. Gordon Memorial Speakership, Optica (2020)
- Mildred Dresselhaus Lecturer, Massachusetts Institute of Technology (2021)
- Vannevar Bush Faculty Fellow, United States Department of Defense (2022)
- Member, National Academy of Sciences (2023)
