= CDV3 (gene) =

Human protein-coding gene

Identifiers
- Aliases: CDV3, H41, CDV3 homolog
- External IDs: GeneCards: CDV3

Gene location (Human)
Chr.	Chromosome 3 (human)
Band	3q22.1	Start	133,573,686 bp
Band	3q22.1	End	133,590,261 bp
RNA expression pattern
Bgee	Human / Mouse (ortholog); Top expressed in: parietal pleura; visceral pleura; cartilage tissue; Skeletal muscle tissue of biceps brachii; Skeletal muscle tissue of rectus abdominis; mucosa of sigmoid colon; germinal epithelium; glutes; tendon of biceps brachii; corpus epididymis / n/a; More reference expression data
BioGPS	n/a
Gene ontology
Molecular function	molecular function
Cellular component	cytoplasm; cytosol; plasma membrane; nucleolus
Biological process	cell population proliferation
Sources:Amigo / QuickGO
Orthologs
Databases	NCBI: entry; OMA: entry
Species	Human	Mouse
Entrez	55573	102639170
Ensembl	ENSG00000091527	n/a
UniProt	Q9UKY7	n/a
RefSeq (mRNA)	NM_001134422; NM_001134423; NM_001282762; NM_001282763; NM_001282764 NM_001282765; NM_017548	n/a
RefSeq (protein)	NP_001127894; NP_001127895; NP_001269691; NP_001269692; NP_001269693 NP_001269694; NP_060018	n/a
Location (UCSC)	Chr 3: 133.57 – 133.59 Mb	n/a
PubMed search
- Wikidata
View/Edit Human	View/Edit Mouse

Protein CDV3 homolog also known as carnitine deficiency-associated gene expressed in ventricle 3 is a protein that in humans is encoded by the CDV3 gene.

CDV3 is a biomarker for hepatocellular carcinoma. CDV3 has been considered as a potential target for gene therapy. Related gene families include plasma proteins and predicted intracellular proteins.

== Gene ==
=== Aliases ===
The CDV3 protein is also commonly known as tyrosine-phosphorylated protein 36 (TPP36). TPP36 isoforms have been found to be substrates of Abl tyrosine kinase.

=== Locus ===
The CDV3 gene is on chromosome 3 (3q22.1).

Chromosome location of CDV3 from NCBI Gene.

=== Exons ===
There were variations in the listed number of exons in CDV3 between genetic databases. The number of exons vary based on the isoform in question, with most transcript isoforms having 5 exons.

=== Span ===
The exons of human CDV3 gene's longest transcript isoform span 16,711 bp.

== Transcripts ==
=== Isoforms ===
CDV3 has seven isoforms, and more are continuously added to databases as they are discovered. Currently there are isoforms a-f.

== Protein ==
Molecular weight: 27.3 kD

Protein length: 258 aa

Isoelectric point: 5.89

=== Motifs ===
A SAPS analysis on the human CDV3 protein sequence found one uncharged cluster segment from 28-75 aa. There were no signs of high scoring hydrophobic segments. One high scoring transmembrane segment was found from 28-55 aa. CDV3 was found to have significant maximal spacing from 27-76 aa.

==== Repeats ====
The following repetitive structures were found for the protein.

Aligned matching blocks:

[45-52] AGAAGGGA

[66-73] AGAAGPGA

with superset:

[32-36] AGAAG

[45-49] AGAAG

[ 66- 70] AGAAG

______________________________

[134-137] MEKS

[213-216] MEKS

______________________________

Simple tandem repeat:

[31-43] AAGAA_GSAGGSSG

[44-54] AAGAAGGGAGA

=== Predicted motifs ===
PROSITE found several potential motifs in CDV3.

Motif	Predicted site (base pair location)
Alanine-rich region: 28-77
Glycine-rich region: 33-72
Predicted protein kinase C (PKC) phosphorylation sites	25-27, 107-109, 178-180, 179-181, 201-203, 207-209
Casein kinase ii phosphorylation site	79-82, 107-110, 207-210
Tyrosine kinase phosphorylation site	237-244

=== Predicted secondary structure ===
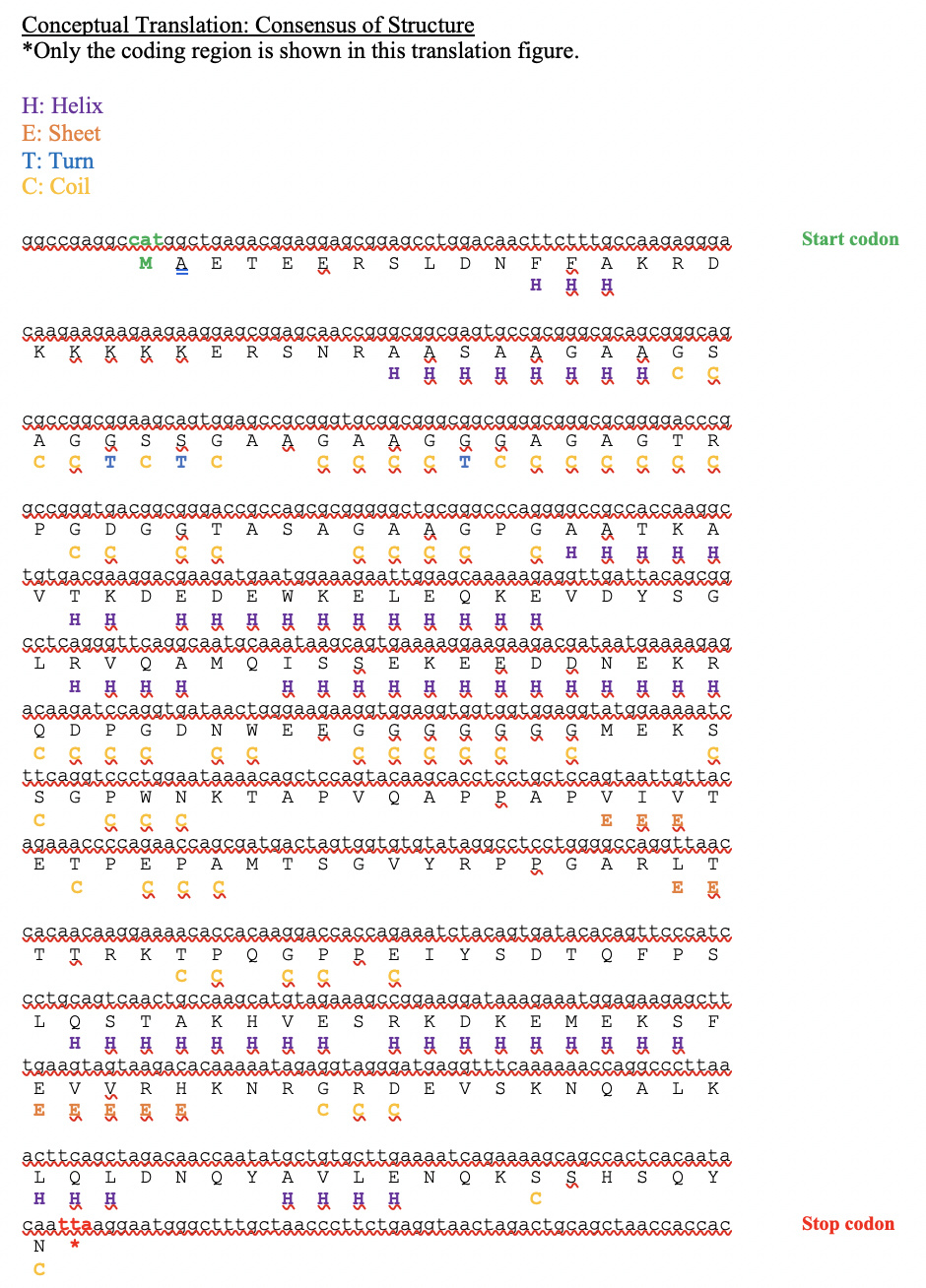
Conceptual translation of the longest CDV3 isoform annotated with CDV3's predicted secondary structure and conserved amino acids.

The following programs were used to develop this figure: JPred, CFSSP, and GOR4. The majority of the CDV3 structure is hypothesized to be alpha helices and random coil.

=== Predicted 3d structure ===
The 3D structure of CDV3 was predicted through amino acid submission to the Zhang Lab and their I-TASSER program.

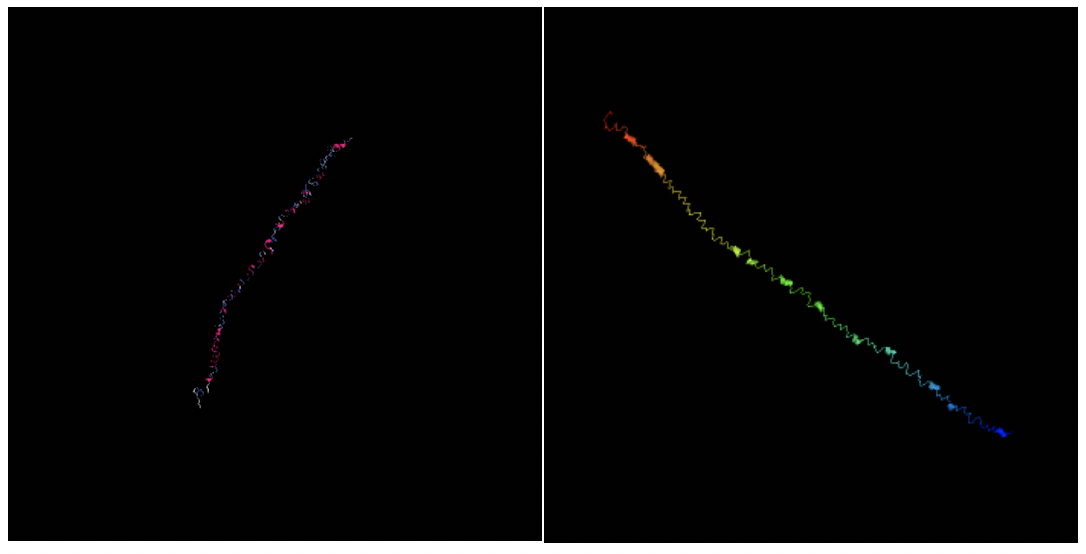
Predicted CDV3 3D structure from I-TASSER.

== Gene regulation ==
=== Promoter ===
There are currently six different predicted promoters based on supporting transcripts. The following promoters were found using Genomatix . Promoter GXP_141972 was chosen for further analysis because of the large number of supporting transcripts, and it was found to be conserved in 14 of 14 orth. loci.

Promoter name	Coordinates	Size	# of supporting transcripts
GXP_141970	133585623 - 133586723	1101	1
GXP_141972	133572563 - 133574180	1618	12
GXP_141973	133587952 - 133589052	1101	1
GXP_6749779	133573434 - 133574748	1315	13
GXP_7542845	133569573 – 133574748	1101	*
GXP_7542846	133583006 - 133584149	1144	*

*No transcript assigned.

=== Expression patterns ===
CDV3 is ubiquitously expressed, and at relatively high levels, in all tissues examined in the humans. Higher expression existed in certain diseases.

==== Gene profile ====
Various experiments showing expression of CDV3 demonstrated different patterns of tissue expression; however, it is concluded that the gene is expressed ubiquitously throughout all tissue types with more expression within tissues involved in the immune system and skeletal muscle tissue.

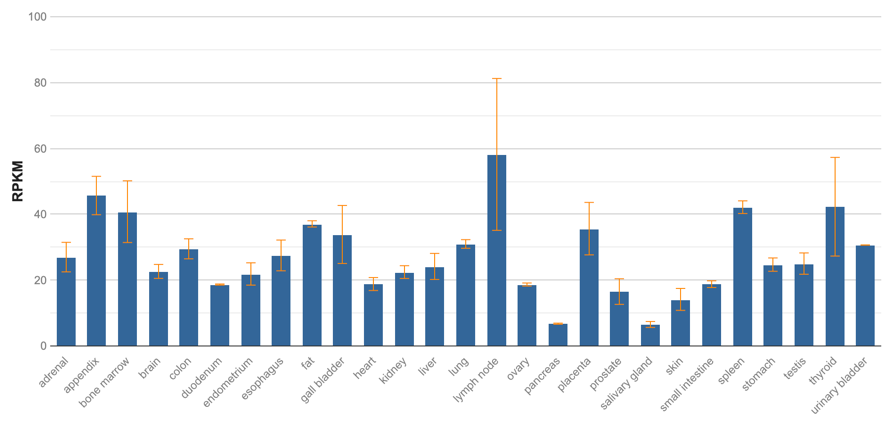
HPA RNA-seq Normal Tissue Expression from NCBI Gene entry on CDV3.

The expression of CDV3 generally decreases throughout fetal development, but expression levels remain high.

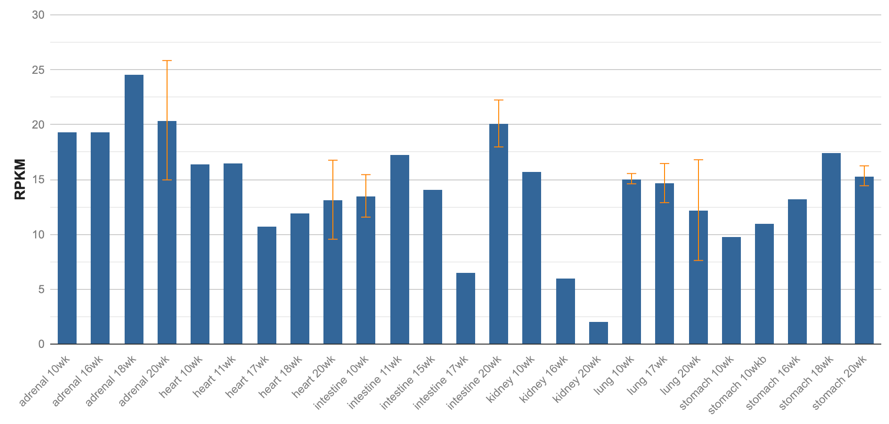
Tissue-specific circular RNA induction during human fetal development from NCBI Gene entry on CDV3.

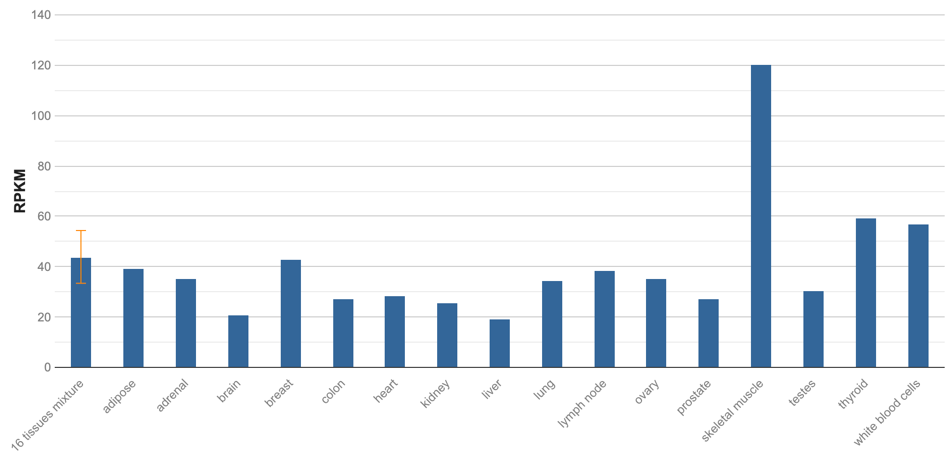
RNA sequencing of total RNA from 20 human tissues from NCBI Gene entry on CDV3.

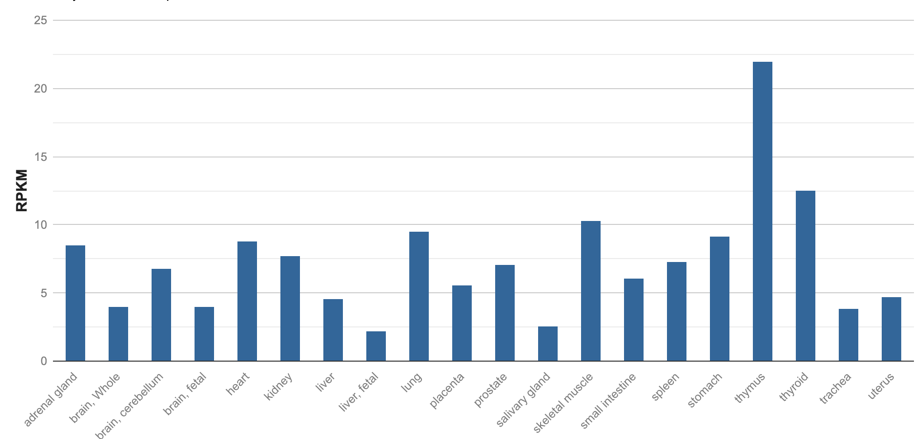
Illumina bodyMap2 transcriptome from NCBI Gene entry on CDV3.

== Protein level regulation ==
A conceptual translation was made from NCBI reference sequence NM_017548.4. Amino acids conserved in at least 70% of vertebrate orthologous proteins are bolded (seen in the section below).

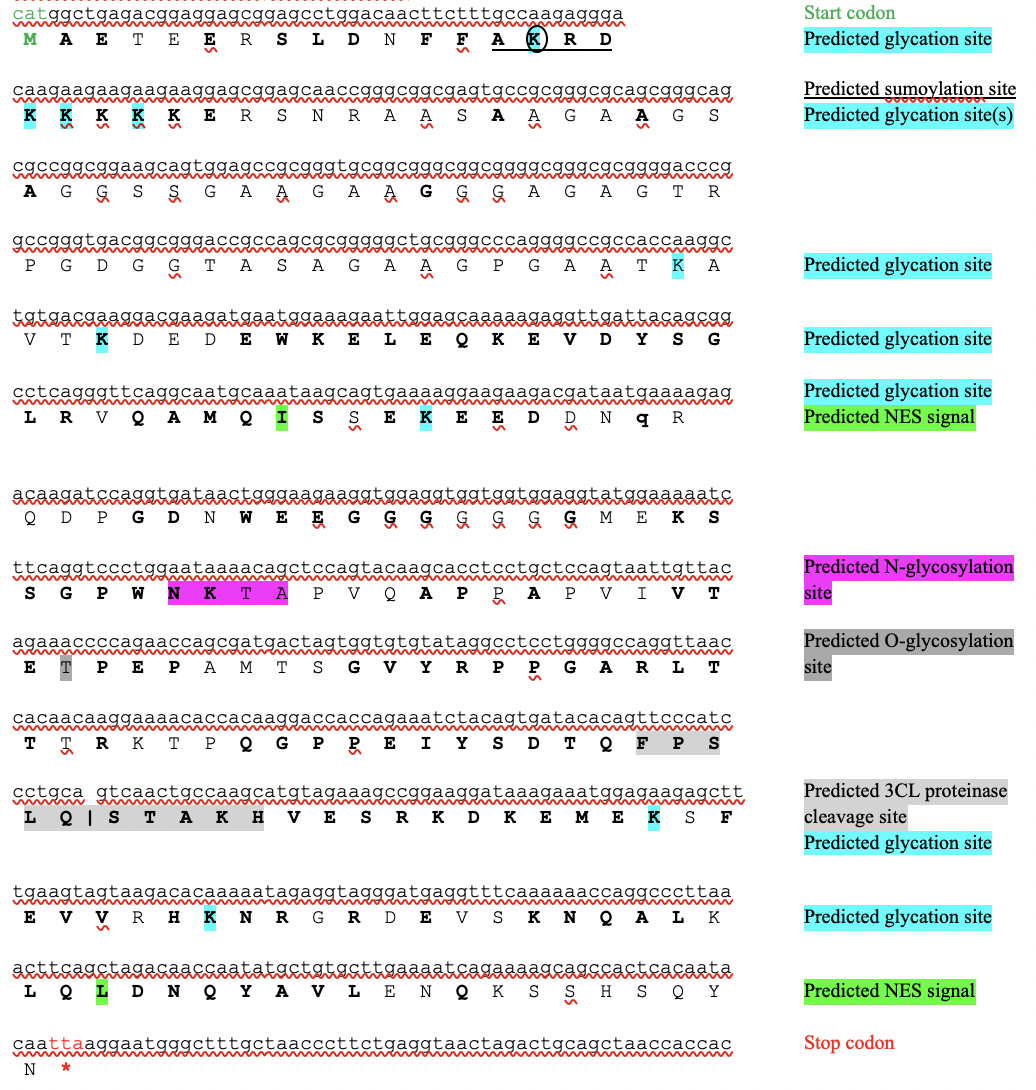
A conceptual translation showing predicted sites of CDV3 protein regulation.

== Evolution ==
=== Orthologs ===
The following orthologs were found through the NCBI database. The date of divergence between species and Homo sapies was determined using TimeTree. The sequence identity and similarity were found using BLAST.

Genus and species	Common name	Taxonomic group	Date of divergence (median time)	Accession number	Sequence length (aa)	Sequence identity	Sequence similar
Homo sapiens	Human	Mammalia	0	Q9UKY7	258	100	100
Macaca mulatta	Rhesus macaque	Mammalia	28.1	AFH33110	257	98	98
Callithrix jacchus	Common marmoset	Mammalia	42.6	JAB08658	257	98	98
Castor canadensis	American beaver	Mammalia	88	JAV41819	265	89	89
Mus musculus	House mouse	Mammalia	89.8	Q4VAA2.2	281	73	79
Lonchura striata domestica	Society finch	Bird	320	OWK55384	248	62	74
Xenopus laevis	African clawed frog	Amphibia	353	NP_001080515	240	58	73
Electrophorus electricus	Electric eel	Fish	432	XP_026860127	230	55	74
Oryzias melastigma	Marine Medaka	Fish	432	XP_024136300	230	50	63
Danio rerio	Zebrafish	Fish	432	NP_997886	236	48	59

=== Paralogs ===
No human paralogs were found for CDV3 GeneCards and GenesLikeMe databases through the Weizmann Institute of Science. There were not any other relevant sources when the Google Search was conducted.

=== Phylogenetic tree ===
A phylogenetic tree was developed from the species listed in the table above using "One Click Mode" on Phylogeny.fr.

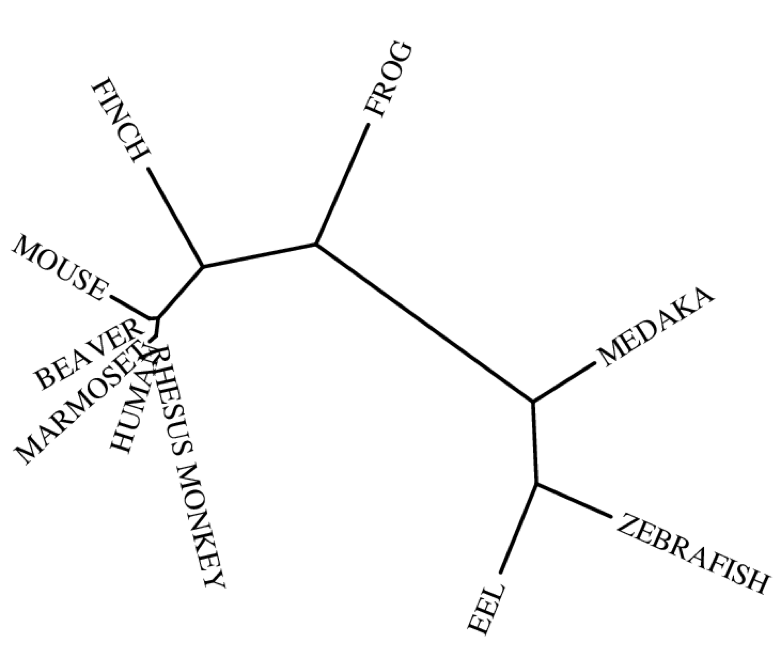
Phylogenetic tree of species with CDV3 orthologs using Phylogeny.fr

== Interacting proteins ==
Interacting protein	Sources supporting the interaction	Function	Common tissues
MYC	IntAct, mentha	Family of regular genes and proto-oncongenes; code for transcription factors; **persistently expressed in cancer**	Uterus, cervix, leukemia, carcinoma
EWSR1	mentha, BioGRID	EWS RNA-binding protein 1; EWS protein function is not fully understood	Brain, lymph, placenta, carcinoma, colon, cervix, liver, ubiquitous
RBM3	mentha, BioGRID	RNA binding motif (RNP1, RNA recognition motif) protein 3	Placenta, carcinoma, T-cell, cervix, liver, colon
U2AF2	mentha, BioGRID	U2 small nuclear RNA auxiliary factor 2; necessary for splicing; non-snRNP protein	Lymph, carcinoma, colon, lymphoblast, cervix, T-cell, liver
ELAVL1	mentha, BioGRID	ELAV like RNA binding protein 1; stabilizes ARE-containing mRNAs; associated with several diseases and cancer	Intestine, cervix, lymphoblast, carcinoma, T-cell, colon, brain, muscle, thymus, ubiquitous
Pr55 (Gag)	mentha, BioGRID, NCBI	Many diverse functions such as assembly and virion maturation; vital to HIV life cycle; cellular biotinylated CDV3 mouse homolog was found to be incorporated into this particle	
PIAS2	NCBI	Encodes inhibitor of activated STAT family; aids in sumoylation of target proteins	

== Clinical significance ==
As earlier in the article, CDV3 has been found to be expressed in patients with various cancers and HIV. CDV3 has also been found to interact with Pr55 in the HIV retrovirus. Without further testing in expression, it is hard to determine how levels alter depending on disease state or the role this gene plays in these illnesses.
