= Dirk Englund =

German physicist and engineer

Dirk Robert Englund
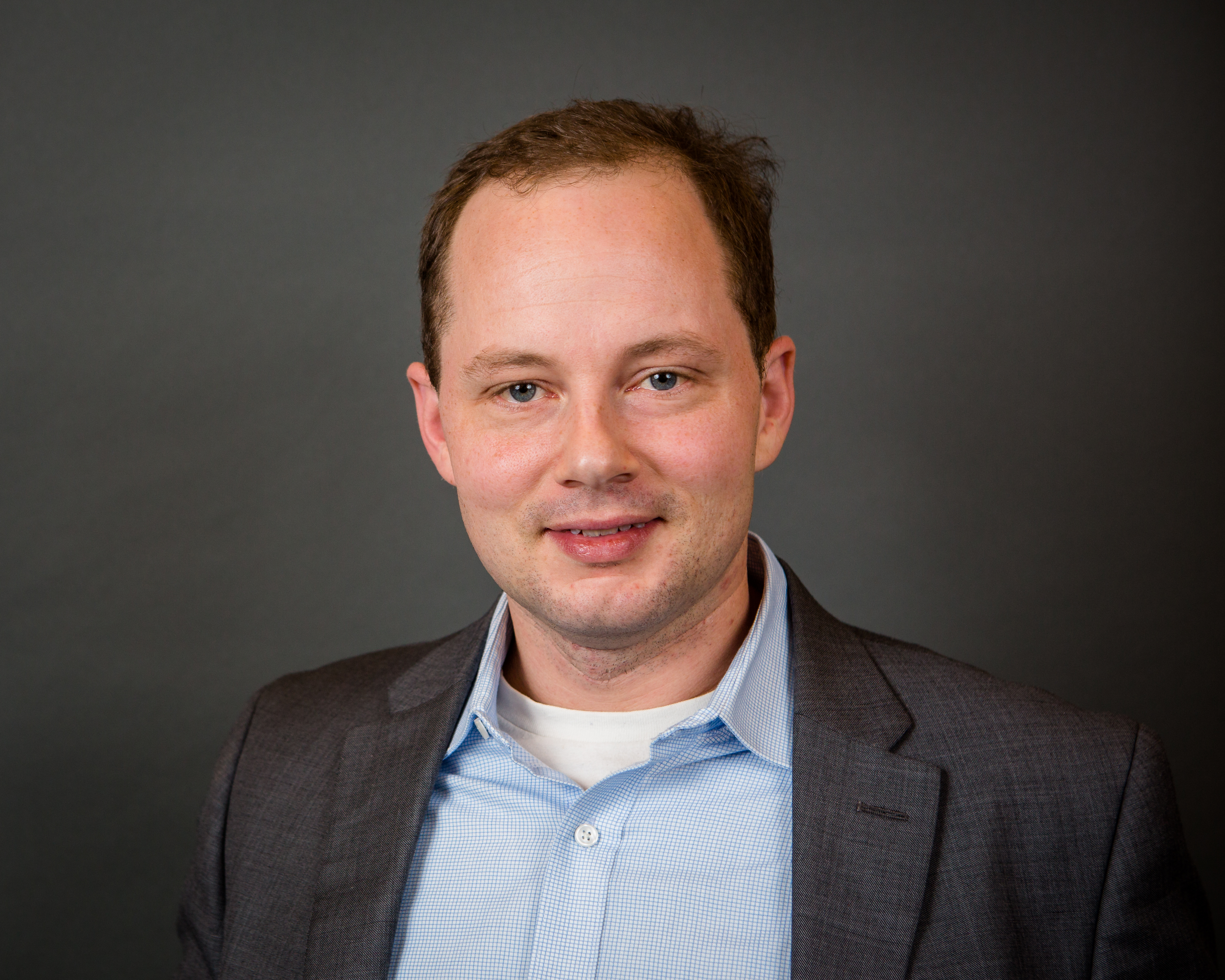
- Born: Germany
- Education: California Institute of Technology, Stanford University
- Awards: Optica Fellow, Humboldt Professorship, Adolph Lomb Medal, IBM Faculty Award
- Scientific career
- Fields: Photonics, Quantum information, Optical computing
- Workplaces: Massachusetts Institute of Technology, Columbia University, NTT Research, Inc.
- Thesis: Photonic crystals for quantum and classical information processing (2008)
- Doctoral advisors: Jelena Vuckovic
- Website: https://qp.mit.edu, https://phi.ntt-research.com/partners/#:~:text=Dirk%20Englund

Dirk Robert Englund is a Professor of Electrical Engineering and Computer Science at the Massachusetts Institute of Technology and academic research partner with the NTT Research Physics and Informatics (PHI) Lab. He is known for his research in quantum photonics and optical computing.

== Biography and education ==
Dirk Robert Englund grew up in Germany and California. He attended the California Institute of Technology, where he majored in physics and received his B.S. in 2002. After spending one year at the Technical University of Eindhoven on a Fulbright scholarship, he returned to the United States to earn his M.S. in electrical engineering and Ph.D. in applied physics from Stanford University in 2008 under the supervision of Jelena Vuckovic. He then completed postdoctoral research in the group of Mikhail Lukin at Harvard University. Dirk Englund is the son of American Assyriologist, Robert Keith Englund.

== Career and research ==
From 2010 to 2013, Englund was an Assistant Professor of Electrical Engineering and of Applied Physics at Columbia University. In 2013, he moved to Massachusetts Institute of Technology, where he is currently a Professor of Electrical Engineering and Computer Science. He is also an NTT Research Physics and Informatics (PHI) Lab Academic Research Partner.

Englund’s research focuses on photonic devices and systems for quantum information technologies and machine learning acceleration. He has contributed to a wide range of topics in photonics including quantum dot light emission in photonic crystals, solid-state quantum memories in nitrogen-vacancy centers in diamond, graphene integration for photodetectors, optical accelerators for machine learning, and programmable photonic circuits for cryogenic environments. In 2022, he and his team demonstrated power-efficient neural network inference on network edge devices using a fiber optic link and telecommunication components.

His work has led to several spin-off companies: DUST Identity is developing diamond nitrogen-vacancy centers for authentication; Lightmatter is developing photonic computing platforms; QuEra Computing is building quantum computers using neutral atoms; and Quantum Network Technologies is developing quantum repeaters for networks.

== Awards ==
Englund has received numerous awards in recognition of his research, including a Humboldt Professorship, the Optica Adolph Lomb Medal, and an IBM Faculty Award. He is an Optica Fellow.
