= QuEra =

Quantum Computing company in Boston, Massachusetts

QuEra Computing Inc.
- Type: Private company
- Industry: Quantum Computing
- Founded: 2018; 8 years ago
- Founders: Mikhail Lukin; Vladan Vuletić; Markus Greiner; Dirk Englund; Nathan Gemelke; John Pena
- Headquarters: Boston, Massachusetts, United States
- Key people: Andy Ory, chief executive officer; Takuya Kitagawa, president; Vladan Vuletić, chief technology officer; Mikhail Lukin, chief scientist; Ed Durkin, chief financial officer; Yuval Boger, chief commercial officer; Nathan Gemelke, chief technology strategist; Dean Bogdanovic, SVP engineering
- Products: Aquila; Bloqade; Gemini; Kirin
- Website: www.quera.com

QuEra Computing Inc. is an American quantum computing company based in Boston, Massachusetts. The company develops quantum computers using neutral atoms based on research conducted at both Harvard University and MIT. QuEra also develops software for simulating systems of Rydberg atoms and finding solutions to combinatorial optimization problems. In 2022, it released its 256-qubit machine Aquila to the public through the Amazon cloud service Braket.

== History ==
QuEra Computing was founded by Mikhail Lukin, Vladan Vuletić, Markus Greiner, Dirk Englund, Nathan Gemelke, and John Pena in 2018.

Prior to QuEra's founding, research into using and controlling neutral atoms had already started in 2015 at Harvard and MIT, culminating in a 51-qubit machine which later led to the development of a 256-qubit machine.

On October 24, 2024, the Massachusetts Green High Performance Computing Center announced a $16 million expansion to its computing campus, planning to build a quantum computing complex. QuEra Computing was announced as a partner in the project.

On June 3, 2025, QuEra opened a 3,500 sq. ft. flagship UK hub in Harwell Science and Innovation Campus’ Tech Foundry. This builds upon QuEra’s existing collaboration with the National Quantum Computing Centre (NQCC) and supports the company’s expansion through the UK and across Europe.

On February 4, 2026, the National Energy Research Scientific Computing Center (NERSC) at Lawrence Berkeley National Lab (Berkeley Lab) called for proposals as part of its Quantum Computing Access at NERSC (QCAN) program to conduct research on QuEra’s Aquila and Gemini. Up to six projects will be selected for the three-month Stage A, to commence in April 2026 to demonstrate the potential to run on real hardware. Aquila teams will be allocated up to 12.5 hours of QPU usage each while Gemini teams will focus on simulation and workflow development instead of hardware usage. Aquila teams that advance to Stage B will be allocated up to 25 hours of additional QPU time each to complete their research, while Gemini teams will be allocated up to 10 hours of QPU time each. If any teams do not advance, their QPU time will be redistributed to advancing teams. Projects will be completed by December 31, 2026.

== Technology ==
=== System architecture and design ===
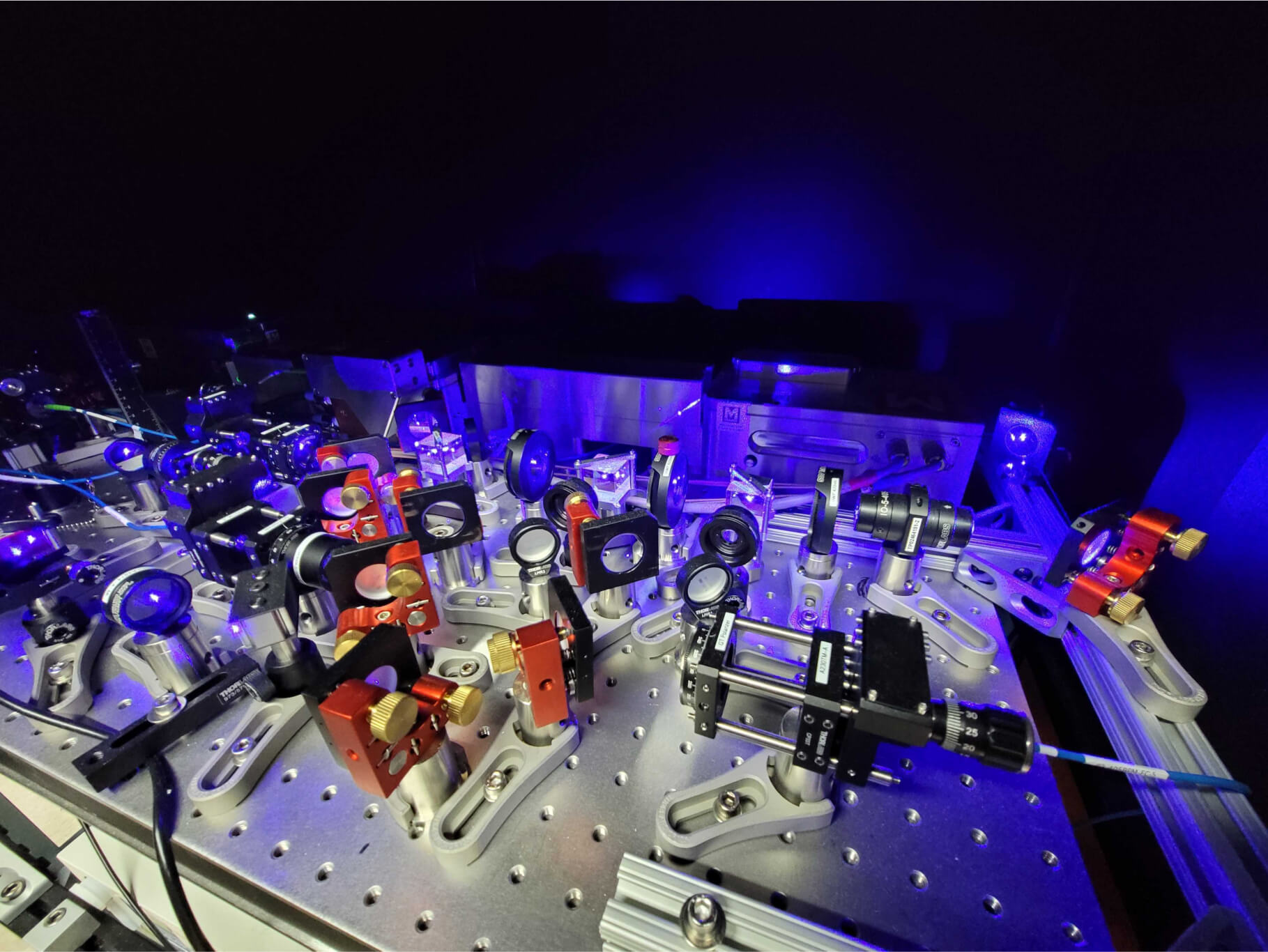
Optical layout of the QuEra Aquila system, showing laser control and atom arrangement using optical tweezers.

QuEra uses neutral atoms based on Rubidium which are controlled and trapped using lasers as its qubits. The company commercializes a neutral atom array developed in Mikhail Lukin’s lab through a licensing agreement with Harvard’s Office of Technology Development for the Lukin group’s patent portfolio. Ultra-cold, suspended rubidium atoms move about and can be entangled mid-computation to perform gates. Logical operations involve the parallel, multiplexed, laser control of the entire groups of atoms that constitute logical qubits.

QuEra was selected by the Defense Advanced Research Projects Agency (DARPA) to participate in Stage B of the Quantum Benchmarking Initiative (QBI), joining ten other leading companies in the quantum computing industry. This selection follows QuEra's successful completion of Stage A, which required participants to outline a path to developing utility-scale quantum computers. The QBI program seeks to assess whether a practical, industrially useful quantum computer can be realized by 2033.

=== Analog computing mode ===
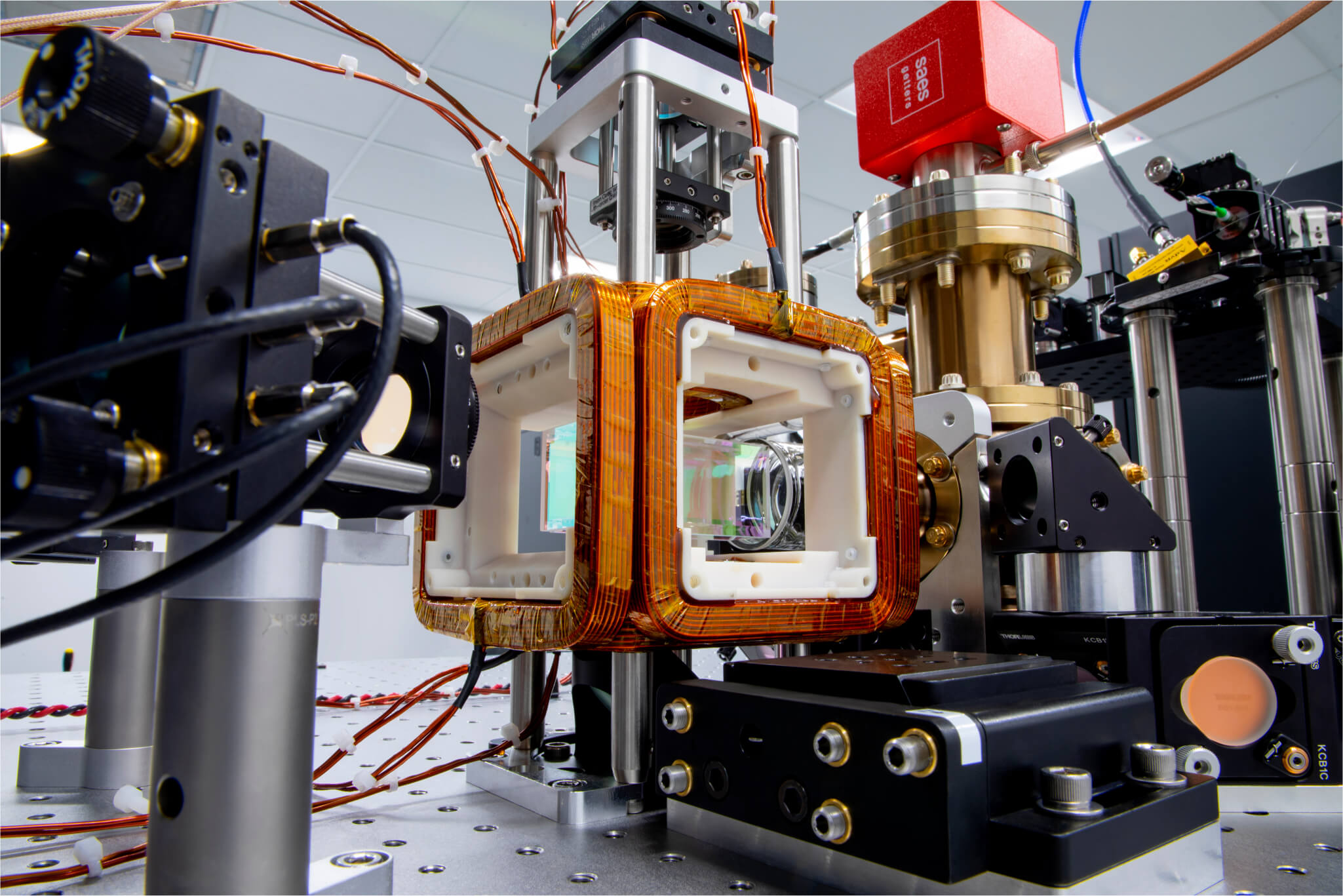
Magneto-optical trap used to cool and confine rubidium atoms prior to arrangement into qubit arrays.

On November 1, 2022, QuEra released its 256-qubit machine Aquila, to the general public through the Amazon cloud service Braket.

QuEra currently supports an analog computing mode that relies on the Rydberg blockade phenomenon and the position of atoms to achieve superposition and entanglement. The analog mode could allow problems such as the Maximum Weight Independent set (graph theory) (MWIS) to be expressed and solved with research from the company to map other problems onto MWIS as well QuEra actively conducts research in Condensed Matter Physics and combinatorial optimization. A QRC Tutorials repository was created on June 10, 2024, providing a set of tutorials for learning quantum reservoir computing (QRC).

=== Digital computing mode ===
On January 9, 2024, QuEra published a three-year roadmap. It showed >256 atoms with 10 logical qubits and transversal gates in 2024, >3,000 atoms with 30 logical qubits and magic state distillation in 2025, and >10,000 atoms with 100 logical qubits in 2026. The logical qubits were defined as having lower error rates than their constituent physical qubits. A cloud-based logical qubit simulator was due in the first half of 2024.

QuEra planned to offer a hybrid analog-digital quantum computer followed by a fully digital gate-based system. The analog Aquila is typically capable of three shots per second, while the digital Gemini is typically capable of one shot per second.

== Products and systems ==
=== Aquila ===
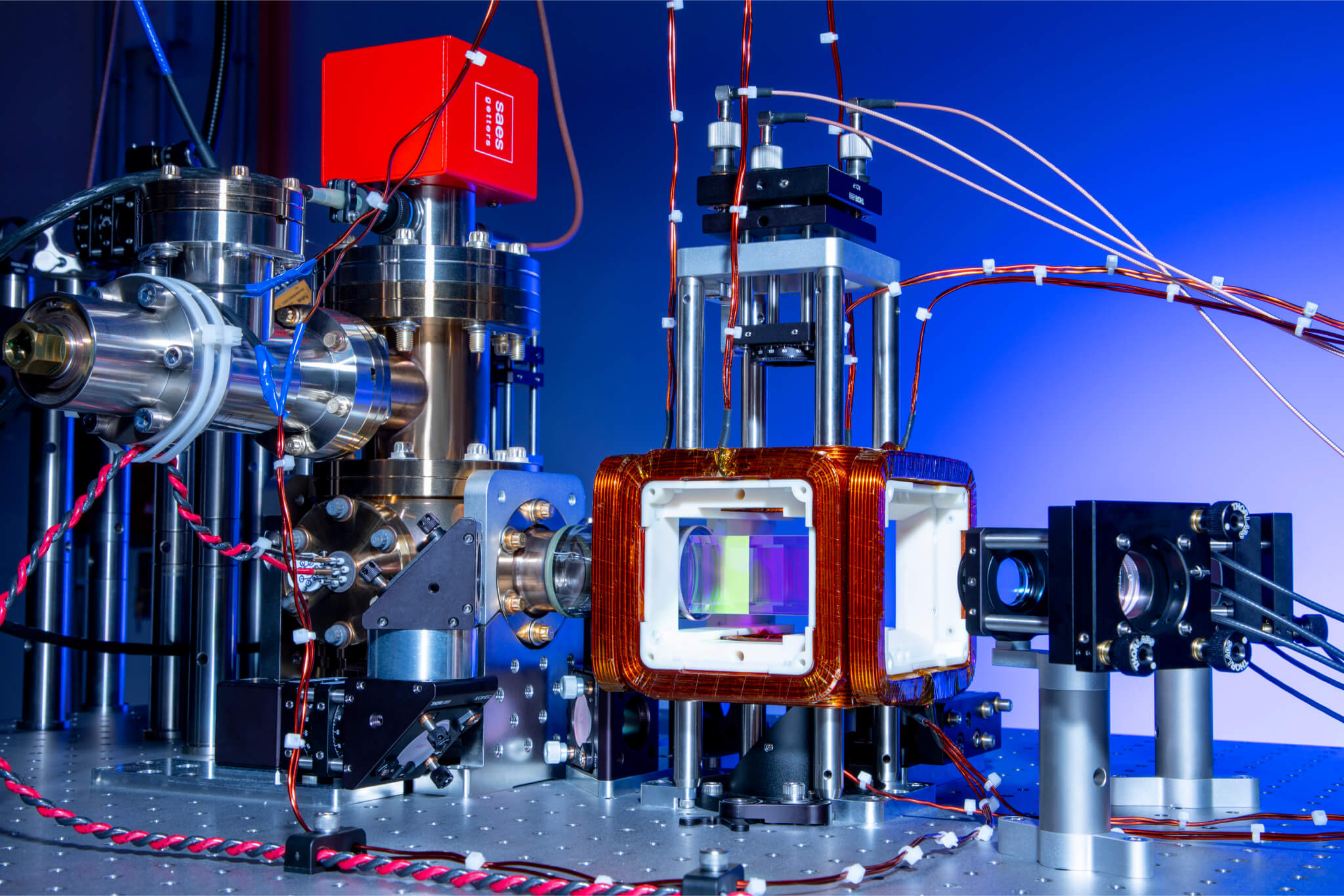
A magneto-optical trap used in QuEra’s Aquila system to cool and confine rubidium atoms before arrangement into qubit arrays.

Aquila is a programmable quantum simulator that uses highly focused lasers to trap and precisely arrange individual ultracold rubidium atoms into two-dimensional arrays of up to 256 qubits. A spatial light modulator shapes an optical two-dimensional wavefront, which transforms light into optical tweezers. A first set of optical tweezers loads atoms into a random arrangement, then a second set moves them into a defect-free antiferromagnetic arrangement in which each atom has the opposite magnetic moment of its neighbors, and then coherent optical beams are used to excite the atoms into Rydberg states. Atomic interactions are used to perform Analog Hamiltonian Simulation (AHS).

=== Gemini ===
Gemini is a 260-atom gate-model quantum computer using 87Rubidium with a dynamic qubit array (DQA™) that allows parallel operations and all-to-all connectivity with room temperature operation. There is a storage zone and an entanglement zone for gate operations. Single-qubit gate fidelity is >99.9% fidelity, two-qubit gate fidelity is >99.2%, and SPAM fidelity is 99.7%. The shot rate is one per second. “Gemini” has been used to demonstrate magic state distillation and is designed for hybrid computing with high-performance computing (HPC) and analog systems.

=== Bloqade ===
Bloqade is QuEra's software stack. Bloqade.jl is an open-source Julia language package for analog quantum computation and simulation on QuEra’s “Aquila.” The repository was created on October 20, 2021. Bloqade Analog is an open-source Python language software development kit (SDK) for “Aquila.” The repository was created on April 18, 2023. Bloqade is an open-source Python language software development kit (SDK) for digital and analog neutral atom quantum computing. The repository was created on January 21, 2025. Bloqade Circuit is an open-source component package of Bloqade containing its circuit eDSLs. The repository was created on April 3, 2025.

=== Kirin ===
Kirin is an open-source Kernel Intermediate Representation Infrastructure for building compilers for embedded domain-specific languages (eDSLs). The repository was created on October 5, 2024.

== Research ==
=== Quantum error correction ===
On December 8, 2023, a Harvard team led by QuEra co-founder Mikhail Lukin published in Nature the demonstration of 48 logical qubits capable of executing hundreds of logical gate operations. The team included QuEra co-founder Markus Greiner and QuEra. The research was supported by the Defense Advanced Research Projects Agency’s (DARPA) Optimization with Noisy Intermediate-Scale Quantum devices program, the National Science Foundation Physics Frontiers Center’s Center for Ultracold Atoms, the Army Research Office, the joint Quantum Institute/NIST, and QuEra.

On November 10, 2025, researchers from Harvard, Caltech, MIT, the Harvard-Smithsonian Center for Astrophysics, NIST/University of Maryland, College Park, and QuEra, published in Nature the demonstration of below-threshold error suppression, logical entanglement, and mid-circuit qubit reuse using surface codes with reconfigurable arrays of up to 448 neutral atoms encoded in up to 96 logical qubits.

=== Neutral-atom system scaling ===
On September 15, 2025, researchers from Harvard and MIT, including QuEra co-founders Mikhail Lukin, Markus Greiner, and Vladan Vuletić published in Nature the demonstration of a coherent 3,000-qubit system with coherent storage and quantum information manipulation. A series of two optical lattice conveyor belts transport atom reservoirs into the science region, where atoms in spin-polarized or coherent superposition states are extracted into optical tweezers at a reloading rate of 300,000 atoms per second. The 30,000+ initialized qubits per second are used to assemble and maintain a 3,000+ atomic array for more than 2 hours. Nearby stored qubits are unaffected.

=== Application and algorithm development ===
In May 2025, it was announced that two of the six research projects advancing to the final phase of Wellcome Leap's Quantum for Bio Challenge involved QuEra. One, in collaboration with Phasecraft and the University of Nottingham, concerns drug discovery targeting myotonic dystrophy. The other, in collaboration with Harvard University and MIT, concerns nuclear magnetic resonance and ligand-protein binding affinity estimation.

On August 5, 2025, QuEra published in the National Library of Medicine “Robust Quantum Reservoir Learning for Molecular Property Prediction” with authors from Deloitte Consulting LLP, Amgen, Technical University of Darmstadt, and Merck Healthcare KGaA. Quantum reservoir computing (QRC) was applied to use molecular descriptors to predict the biological activity of potential drug molecules, finding advantages as dataset sizes decrease and better separability between active and inactive compounds in low-dimensional learned feature spaces.

On September 11, 2025, following the NVentures investment in QuEra, the company’s collaborations with Nvidia were revealed to be: Gemini is integrated with Nvidia’s CUDA-Q software alongside ABCI-Q’s 2,000+ H100 GPUs; QuEra is a founding collaborator at Nvidia's Accelerated Quantum Center in Boston, coupling its hardware with GB200 NVL72 GPU clusters for large-scale simulation and decoder research; and the co-development of Nvidia-trained transformer models for quantum error correction (QEC).

== Deployments and partnerships ==
Unrelated to the aforementioned Quantum Benchmarking Initiative, on October 23, 2023, QuEra was awarded two Defense Advanced Research Projects Agency (DARPA) Imagining Practical Applications for a Quantum Tomorrow (IMPAQT) contracts for quantum algorithms. The first, “Quantum Reservoir Learning using Neutral Atoms and its Applications,” extended a previous quantum machine learning proof-of-concept involving the MNIST handwritten digit dataset. The second, “Error-Corrected Quantum Architectures Based on Transversal Logical Gates,” involved surface codes with the use of transversal logical entangling gates. Five of QuEra’s partners also received DARPA IMPAQT grants for their projects involving QuEra’s Aquila.

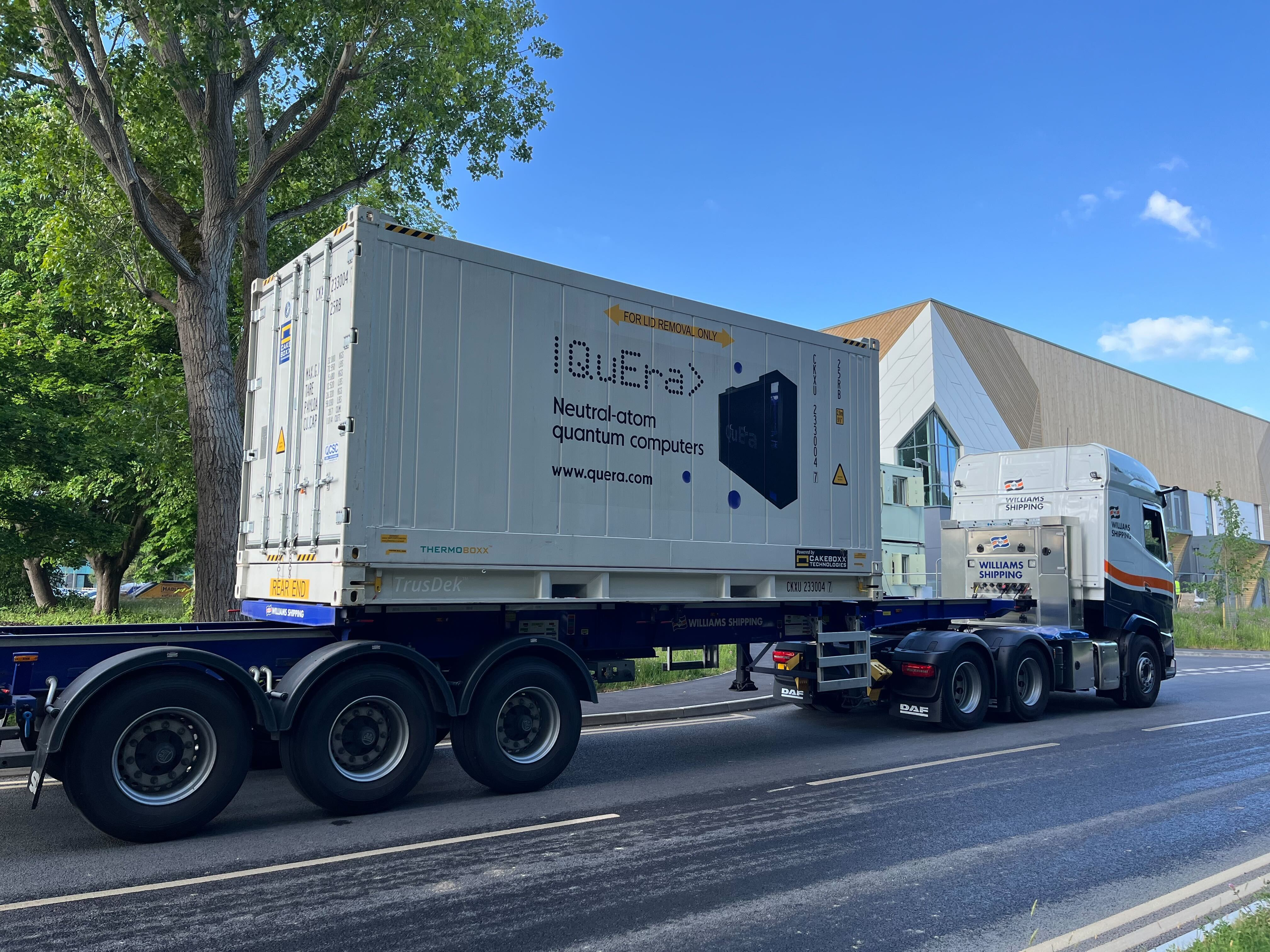
Delivery of a QuEra quantum system to the UK Research and Innovation (UKRI) facility.

On February 5, 2024, QuEra announced that the UK’s National Quantum Computing Centre (NQCC) at Harwell, Oxfordshire, with support from the Small Business Research Initiative (SBRI) framework, would host a qubit shuttling and error correction testbed to be built by QuEra and UK-based collaborators in early 2025.

On April 30, 2024, QuEra was awarded a JPY 6.5B (USD $42M) contract to deliver a computer to Japan’s National Institute of Advanced Industrial Science and Technology (AIST), where it would be installed in 2025 on-premises alongside the ABCI-Q supercomputer to develop a hybrid quantum-classical computing platform. Installation and integration were announced on May 29, 2025, also marking QuEra’s milestone first on-premises deployment.

On August 30, 2024, E4 Computer Engineering announced that it was one of the founding members of the QuEra Quantum Alliance Partner Program. Other organizations have subsequently joined, including Algorithmiq in December 2024, Horizon Quantum in July 2025, Boston Consulting Group’s BCG X AI Science Institute in September 2025, and SDT in November 2025. At the time it joined in July 25, Horizon Quantum announced that it was joining more than 25 organizations then in the alliance.

In February 2025, Deloitte Tohmatsu Group entered into a strategic collaboration with QuEra to accelerate the development of Japan’s quantum industry, including promoting awareness, developing human resources, conducting research, creating use cases, and nurturing startups. It included a capital alliance through Deloitte Tohmatsu Financial Advisory LLC.

In March 2025, QuEra joined Nu Quantum’s Quantum Datacenter Alliance (QDA).

At GTC2025, Nvidia announced that it would be building the Nvidia Accelerated Quantum Research Center (NVAQC) in Boston and that QuEra would be one of the collaborators there.

On November 17, 2025, QuEra announced a collaboration with Dell Technologies to demonstrate a prototype of the integration of quantum computers into datacenters, hybrid classical-quantum computing (HQCC), secure data governance, and low latency at Supercomputing 2025 (SC25). The prototype demonstration would be a Greenberger–Horne–Zeilinger (GHZ) state.

On February 2, 2026, QuEra and Roadrunner Venture Studios announced a $4M strategic partnership to build a quantum testbed with full-time, on-premises QuEra staff at the Roadrunner Quantum Lab (RQL) in Albuquerque, New Mexico. It will be QuEra’s second location in the United States.

== Funding ==
Date	Round	Amount	Post-money valuation	Lead investors	Other investors	Notes
November 17, 2021	–	$17 million	–	–	Rakuten, Day One Ventures, Frontiers Capital, Serguei Beloussov, Paul Maritz	Emerged from stealth with initial funding
February 11, 2025	Series B	$230 million	$1 billion	SoftBank Vision Fund, Google Quantum AI	Valor Equity Partners, QVT Family Office, Safar Partners	Convertible note to convert in next equity round
September 9, 2025	Series B extension	–	–	NVentures (venture arm of Nvidia)	–	Extension of Series B round

== Leadership ==
QuEra was cofounded by Mikhail Lukin, Vladan Vuletić, Markus Greiner, Dirk Englund, Nathan Gemelke, and John Pena.

On July 15, 2024, QuEra announced that Alex Keesling would transition from CEO to an unnamed new role and that the Board of Directors had appointed board member Andy Ory to serve as the acting CEO while the board searched for a replacement. Andy Ory was previously the co-founder and CEO of 128 Technology. Before that, he was at Acme Packet, which was sold in 2013 to Oracle Corporation for $2.1 billion in 2013.

The leadership team includes Andy Ory (chief executive officer), Takuya Kitagawa (president), Vladan Vuletić (chief technology officer), Mikhail Lukin (chief scientist), Ed Durkin (chief financial officer), Yuval Boger (chief commercial officer), Nathan Gemelke (chief technology strategist), and Dean Bogdanovic (SVP engineering). Takuya Kitagawa also serves as Representative Director and President of QuEra Computing Japan, Inc.

== See also ==
- Quantum computing
- Cloud-based quantum computing
- Rebecca Krauthamer
