= Hatice Altug =

Turkish/American bioengineer

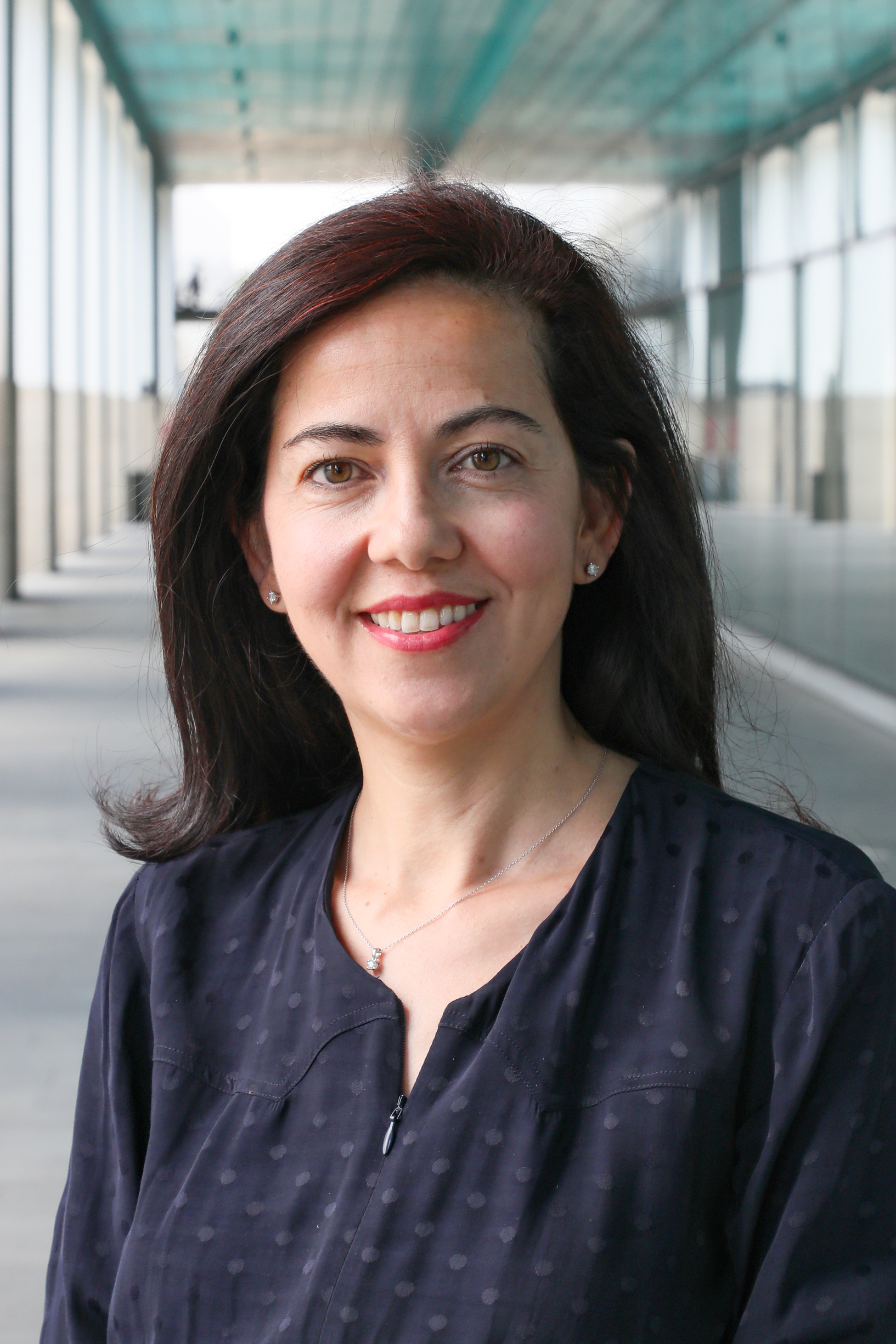
- Hatice Altug in 2020
- Born: 1978 (age 47–48); Antalya, Turkey
- Citizenship: Turkey
- Scientific career
- Fields: Physics; Nanophotonics; Biosensing; Microfluidics; Nanofabrication
- Workplaces: Boston University, École Polytechnique Fédérale de Lausanne (EPFL)

Hatice Altug (Turkish: Altuğ; born 1978) is a Turkish physicist and professor in the Bioengineering Department and head of the Bio-nanophotonic Systems laboratory at École Polytechnique Fédérale de Lausanne (EPFL), in Switzerland. Her research focuses on nanophotonics for biosensing and surface enhanced spectroscopy, integration with microfluidics and nanofabrication, to obtain high sensitivity, label-free characterization of biological material. She has developed low-cost biosensor allowing the identification of viruses such as Ebola that can work in difficult settings and therefore particularly useful in case of pandemics.

Altug was the recipient of United States Presidential Early Career Award for Scientists and Engineers and The Optical Society of America Adolph Lomb Medal. She also received European Research Council Consolidator Award, Office of Naval Research Young Investigator Award, National Science Foundation CAREER Award and Popular Science Magazine Brilliant 10 Award. She is a Fellow of the Optical Society of America.

== Education ==
Altug, who was born in Karamanlı district of Burdur in 1978, completed her high school education in 1996 in Antalya Anatolian High School, Antalya, Turkey. She received her B.Sc. degree in physics in 2000 in Bilkent University (Ankara, Turkey), having been awarded a full scholarship there. In 2007, she was awarded a PhD in applied physics from Stanford University (California, U.S.), under the supervision of Professor Jelena Vučković. During her education at Stanford University, she worked on laser systems and optical instruments.

== Career ==
Altug completed a Postdoctoral Fellowship at the Center for Engineering in Medicine at the Harvard Medical School. From 2007 until 2013, she was first an assistant and later an associate professor of Electrical and Computer Engineering at Boston University.

In 2010, she was awarded the Faculty Early Career Development (CAREER) award by the National Science Foundation. Altug disseminated her findings to the public through Boston’s Museum of Science, local educational programs such as Boston Upward Bound Math and Science, and Boston University’s Summer Challenge program on engineering. At the College of Engineering, she added experimental modules to courses relating to nanotechnology. She was also named one of Popular Science’s “Brilliant 10,” a group of researchers under 40 who made transformational contributions to their fields during 2010.

In 2011, IEEE Photonics Society named Altug as winner of the Young Investigator Award, which recognizes individuals who make outstanding technical contributions to the field of photonics prior to their 35th birthday. She was honored for her groundbreaking achievements in confining and manipulating light at the nanoscale to dramatically improve biosensing capabilities.

Altug was recognized with OSA’s Adolph Lomb Medal in 2012 “for breakthrough contributions on integrated optical nano-biosensor and nanospectroscopy technologies based on nanoplasmonics, nanofluidics, and novel nanofabrication.”

She was also named by President Obama among 94 researchers as a recipient of the 2011 Presidential Early Career Awards for Scientists and Engineers (PECASE), the highest honor bestowed by the United States government on science and engineering professionals in the early stages of their independent research careers. As well as attending the White House ceremony, awardees receive a research grant lasting up to five years. She was awarded for leading the development of a biosensor that uses tiny crystals to manipulate light to detect a virus, a protein, or a cancer cell in a drop of blood.

In 2013, Altug joined Ecole Polytechnique Federale de Lausanne, where she became full professor in 2020.

In 2019, she was awarded the ERC Proof of Concept Grant by the European research council for her project: “Portable Infrared Biochemical Sensor Enabled by Pixelated Dielectric Metasurfaces.”

== Awards and honors ==
- 2021 Fellow of Optica for "pioneering contributions to nano-optics, manipulation of light on-chip, the development of innovative nanobiosensors and sensing techniques, and exemplary contributions to the scientific community and Optica."
- 2020 European Physical Society Emmy Noether Distinction for Women in Physics
- 2019 ERC Proof of Concept Grant
- 2012 Optical Society's Adolph Lomb Medal
- 2011 Presidential Early Career Awards for Scientists and Engineers
- 2011 IEEE Photonics Society Young Investigator Award
- 2010 National Science Foundation Faculty Early Career Development (CAREER) award
