= Jalview =

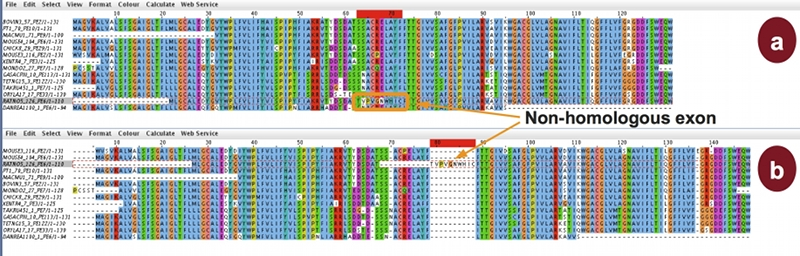
- Developers: Andrew Waterhouse, James Procter, David Martin and Geoff. Barton at the University of Dundee. Original version by Michele Clamp, James Cuff, Stephen Searle, and Geoff. Barton.
- Stable release: 2.11.2 / 10 March 2022; 4 years ago
- Written in: Java
- Operating system: UNIX, Linux, Mac OS X, Microsoft Windows
- Type: Bioinformatics tool
- Licence: GPL
- Website: http://www.jalview.org

Jalview is a piece of bioinformatics software that is used to look at and edit multiple sequence alignments. The program was originally written by Michele Clamp whilst working in Geoff Barton's group at the University of Oxford and European Bioinformatics Institute (EBI). Jalview 2, a re-engineered version produced by Andrew Waterhouse and Jim Procter whilst working in Geoff Barton's group at the School of Life Sciences, University of Dundee, was released in 2005, and its development is supported by the Biotechnology and Biological Sciences Research Council (BBSRC) and Wellcome Trust.

It is used widely by a variety of web servers (e.g. the EBI ClustalW server and the Pfam protein domain database) but is also available as a general purpose alignment editor.

Jalview has a wide range of functions in addition to multiple sequence alignment generation, viewing and editing, including calculating phylogenetic trees and viewing molecular structures. Recent versions of Jalview include features for the analysis of genetic variation from public databases or local Variant Call Format (VCF) files. Jalview connects to many external web services to import data and perform calculations.

== See also ==
- Jpred
