= Geoff Barton (scientist) =

Computational biologist

Geoff Barton FRSE, FRSB
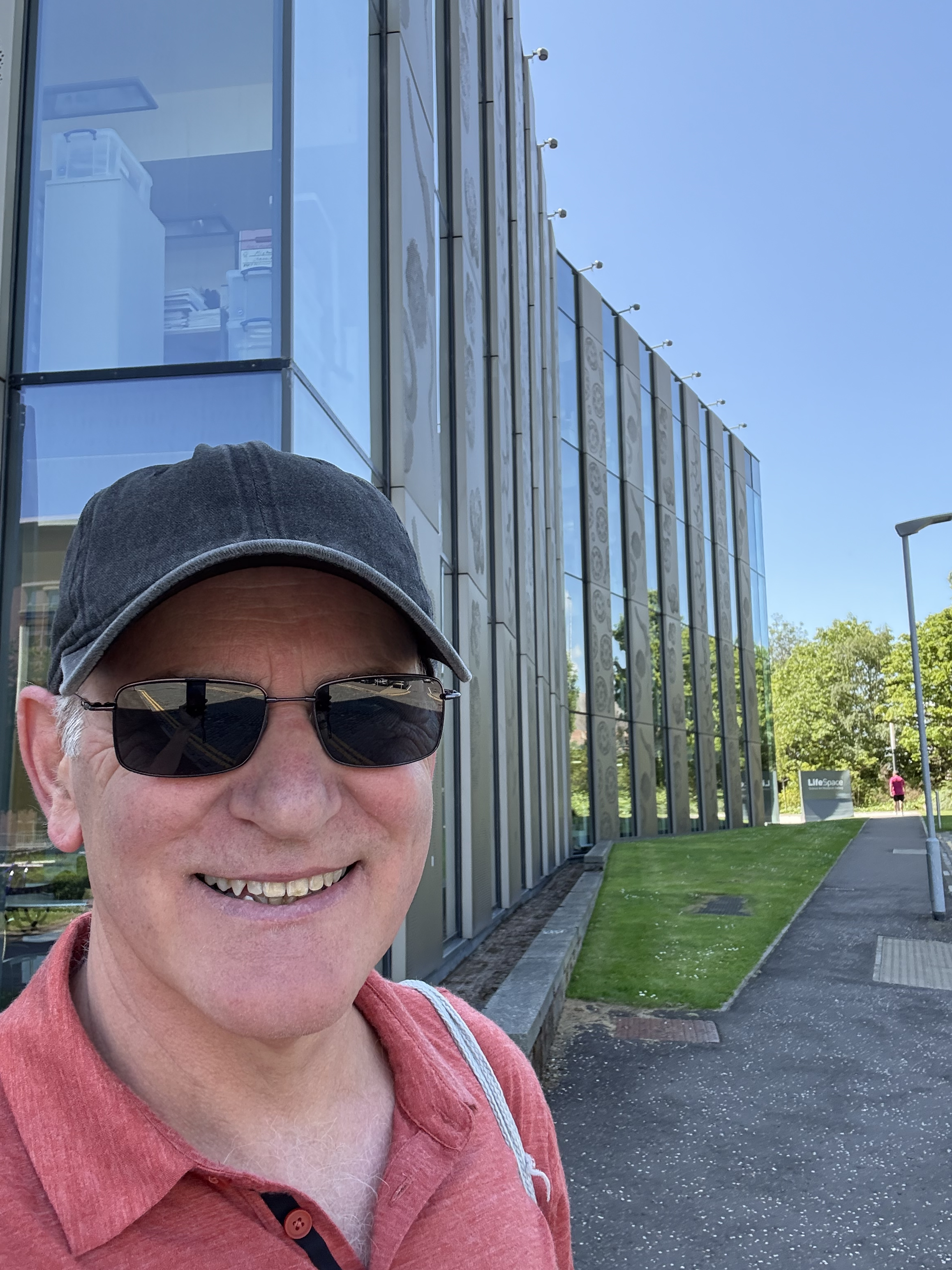
- Barton outside the Discovery Centre, University of Dundee, July 2025
- Born: Geoffrey John Barton; 1 November 1960 (age 65); Glenelg, South Australia
- Citizenship: United Kingdom/Australia
- Education: University of Manchester; Birkbeck, University of London
- Known for: Sequence alignment software, Protein structure prediction, Jalview, JPred
- Scientific career
- Fields: Bioinformatics; Multiple Sequence Alignment; Protein structure prediction; Genetics; Transcriptomics; Machine learning
- Workplaces: University of Dundee; European Bioinformatics Institute; University of Oxford; Imperial Cancer Research Fund
- Thesis: Computer analysis of protein sequence and structure (1987)
- Doctoral advisor: Michael Sternberg
- Website: www.compbio.dundee.ac.uk

Geoffrey ''Geoff'' John Barton (born 1 November 1960) is a computational biologist and Professor of Bioinformatics at the University of Dundee, Scotland, in the UK where he is Head of the Division of Computational Biology in the School of Life Sciences. He is known for his research in computational biology, particularly in the analysis of protein sequences and structures, and for the development of widely used bioinformatics software Jalview. He is also a Fellow of the Royal Society of Edinburgh, Scotland's National Academy.

== Education ==
Barton was educated at Challney High School and Luton Sixth Form College. In 1980 he attended the University of Manchester where he passed the first year of a BSc Honours in Mechanical Engineering before completing a BSc (Hons) in Biochemistry (1984). His final year research project "A Computer programme to aid DNA Sequencing and sequence analysis" tackled the assembly problem for Sanger sequencing on hand read gels. His doctoral thesis in protein structure prediction was supervised by Michael Sternberg at Birkbeck, University of London.

== Career ==
After his Ph.D., Barton was awarded an Imperial Cancer Research Fund (ICRF) Research Fellowship to continue research on protein structure prediction in the Biomedical Computing Unit at the ICRF Laboratories in London. He was then awarded a Royal Society University Research Fellowship in 1989 to establish his group at the University of Oxford where in 1995 he became head of Genome Informatics at the Wellcome Centre for Human Genetics. Barton moved in 1997 to be a Research Team Leader at the European Bioinformatics Institute Cambridge and Head of the Protein Data Bank in Europe before relocating to the University of Dundee in 2001 as Professor of Bioinformatics in the School of Life Sciences. He was initially co-director of the Post-Genomics and Molecular Interactions Centre before becoming Founding Head of the Interdisciplinary Research Division of Computational Biology in 2013.

== Research ==
Barton's research is focused on the development and application of computational tools for the analysis of protein sequences and their three-dimensional structures in the context of evolution to infer structure and function. His work focuses on understanding how DNA changes impact proteins' three-dimensional structure, function, and role in disease. He developed methods for protein multiple sequence alignment, and was an early advocate of benchmarks to assess the accuracy and biological relevance of sequence alignment methods through comparison with alignments based on three-dimensional structures. He has also published benchmarks for RNA-seq and protein ligand binding site prediction.

His group has developed widely cited software tools and techniques: Alscript (multiple sequence alignment formatting), Jalview (data integration and visualisation workbench on multiple sequence alignments), JPred (protein secondary structure prediction), STAMP (alignment of multiple protein three-dimensional structures), and JABAWS (remote execution of software).

Barton established the High Performance Computing facility at the University of Dundee in 2001 and the Division of Computational Biology.

=== Other Interests ===
Barton has released original instrumental music on several streaming platforms. He is also an amateur meteorologist and has maintained the Dundee West End Weather Station since 2002. He was interviewed about the link between bioinformatics and weather forecasting by weather presenter Judith Ralston for the BBC Landward TV show and Stephen Jardine on BBC Radio Scotland.

== Awards and honors ==
- Fellow of the Royal Society of Edinburgh (FRSE), elected 2019
- Fellow of the Royal Society of Biology (FRSB), elected 2011
