= Massachusetts Green High Performance Computing Center =

Intercollegiate computer research center

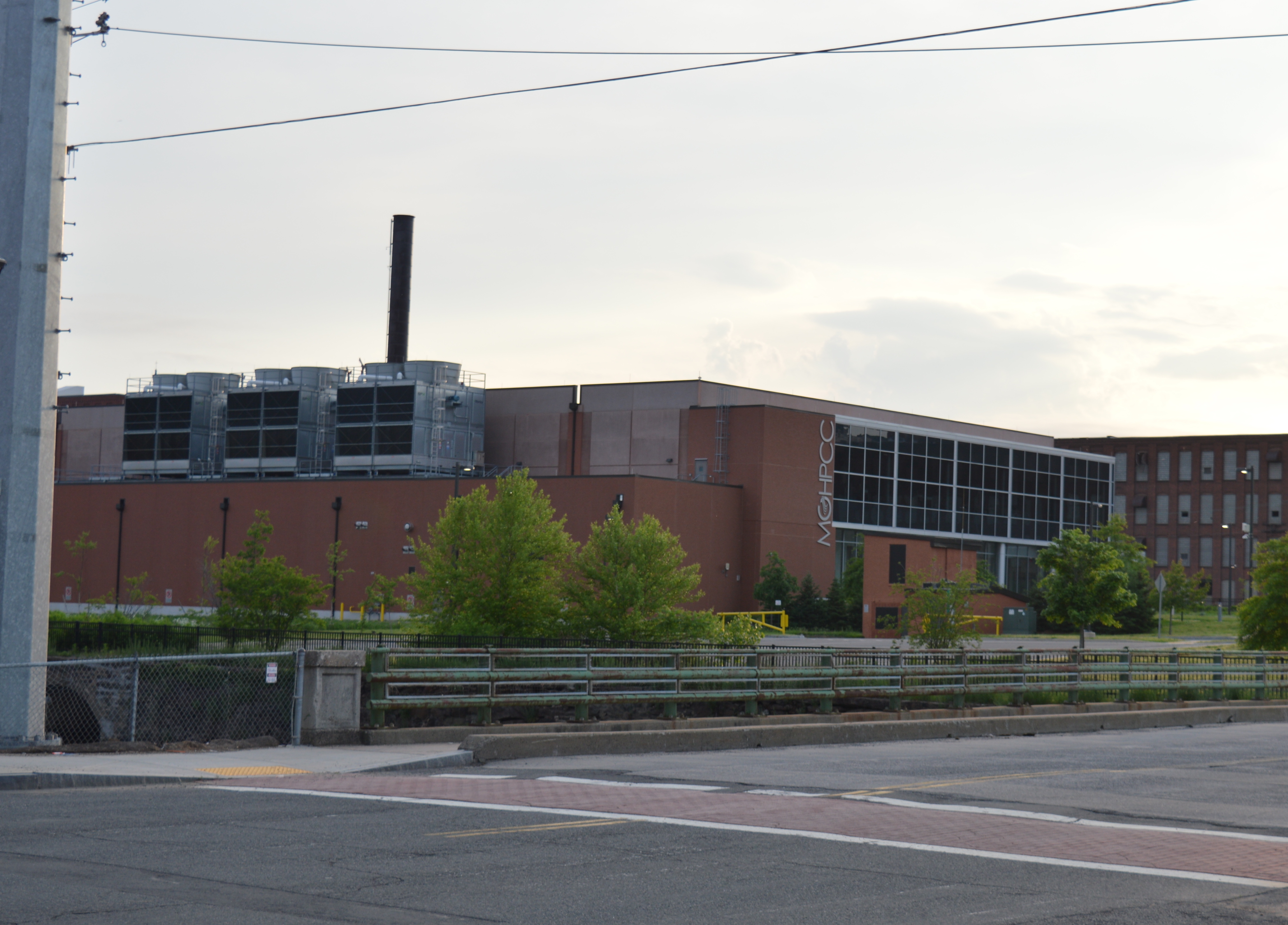
- The main facilities of the MGHPCC
- Established: 2012
- Research type: Multiprogram
- Field of research: Physical science Life science Environmental science Energy science Data science Computational science
- Director: John Goodhue
- Board Chairman: Robert A. Brown (2011–)
- Location: 100 Bigelow Street, Holyoke, MA 01040, Holyoke, Massachusetts, USA; 42°12′9.0756″N 72°36′28.5588″W
- Campus: 8.6 acres
- Affiliations: Commonwealth of Massachusetts; Boston University; Harvard University; Massachusetts Institute of Technology; Northeastern University; University of Massachusetts; Yale University
- Website: www.mghpcc.org

Massachusetts Green High Performance Computing Center (MGHPCC) is an intercollegiate high-performance computing facility located in Holyoke, Massachusetts, connected to that city's municipal fiber grid and powered by Holyoke Gas and Electric via the Holyoke Canal System and Dam. (Note: According to Sharma et al. (2017), 66.7% of its ≈400 annual MWh power consumption came from hydroelectric power provided by Holyoke Gas & Electric in 2017, and including the remaining nuclear, solar, and other carbon-free contracted sources more than 94% of this demand was carbon-neutral.) MGHPCC is a joint venture of Boston University, Harvard, MIT, Northeastern, the University of Massachusetts system, and Yale University; the facility holds the capacity for hundreds of thousands of cores in clusters provided by its affiliates. For example, as of 2016 one cluster used by UMass contained a network of 14,376 cores, both Intel and AMD, and more than 1.1 petabytes of on-site storage on an FDR Infiniband network. The facility maintains capacity for regular expansion, with key partners investing capability upgrades in the current building and more than 4 acres of additional undeveloped space.

== History ==
The Center was first planned in early 2009 in joint discussions between MIT and UMass, with UMass President Jack M. Wilson being a key proponent of the project, and its eventual founding chair. Boston University, Northeastern, and Harvard joined the planning process soon thereafter. Holyoke was selected as the location on June 11, 2009. The specific site was announced on August 9, 2010; a century ago the site had housed a textile mill. Ground was broken on October 5, 2011. The topping off ceremony occurred on November 29, 2011. The facility was completed in November 2012.

== Funding ==
Funding for the construction of the facility came first and foremost from the five university partners. The state of Massachusetts pledged $25 million toward associated costs. Additional support came from Cisco Systems, and EMC Corporation. The U.S. Department of Commerce spent $2.1 million on hydroelectric infrastructure improvements to support the center and similar businesses in the city's Innovation District.

== Infrastructure ==
During the construction of the MGHPCC, partner institutions constructed a link to a point of presence in Chicopee, connecting Holyoke's extensive city fiber network, seen here, to a regional fiber optic communications pathway

Holyoke Gas and Electric partnered with the consortium to do the site selection and to contract for the provision of green power from their hydroelectric facilities. Between 2011-2013, Holyoke Gas and Electric constructed the new North Canal Substation located on Water Street which provides the electrical service for the computer center via two dedicated 34.5 kV feeders directly from the substation's 34.5 kV bus. The MGHPCC shares the 34.5 kV bus exclusively with the Hadley Falls Hydro Electric station, the largest of HG&E's hydro facilities, which creates a direct power path to the computing center from the Hadley Falls plant. Two 115 kV/34.5 kV transformers at the substation connect the bus to the transmission system and provide electricity from the grid to the computing center when the hydro plant is offline or generating less power than the computing center is using. These transformers also function to deliver excess power to the grid when the Hadley Falls station is producing more output than what the computing center is using.

Holyoke's municipal fiber optic network would also play a decisive role in the location of the computing center, and with its construction, a dedicated link 10 gbps was built for the facility's educational affiliates on specialized networks such as the Internet2 consortium.

== Research ==
The MGHPCC facilities have been used for a wide variety of applications including, but not limited to, advanced iterative methods for modeling molecular geometry, the behavior of stellar wind, ecological resilience of renewable energy systems, and neural circuitry. The facility also serves as a data processing center for a commercial and academic partnership hosted by Boston University known as Mass Open Cloud, a collaborative project to create a novel decentralized public cloud based on the Open Cloud eXchange model.

=== Expansion ===
On October 24th 2024, MGHPCC announced a $16 million expansion to its computing campus, planning to build a quantum computing complex. The project is being built with its Boston-based partner, QuEra Computing.
