= Marko V. Jaric =

Serbian-American physicist

Marko V. Jarić (Марко Вукобрат Јарић; March 17, 1952 in Belgrade, Serbia – October 25, 1997 in College Station, Texas) was a Serbian-American physicist. He served as visiting professor at Montana State University and Harvard University, and full professor at Texas A&M University

Jarić was a leading researcher in the field of Quasi-Crystals authoring and editing four influential books. An annual award was established in his name, known as the "Serbian Nobel Prize," for excellence in physics by a Serbian born physicist.
