= Jpred =

Jpred v.4 is the latest version of the JPred Protein Secondary Structure Prediction Server which provides predictions based on the Jnet algorithm, one of the most accurate methods for secondary structure prediction, that has existed since initial work by James Cuff starting in 1998 over many different versions.

Jpred predicts the secondary structure of proteins (e.g. Alpha_helix, Coiled_coil and Beta_sheet) by algorithmic first principles, and neural networks from a protein sequence letter code. The techniques used in Jpred v1 are now deployed today in sophisticated software such as AlphaFold.

The Jpred service was initially created, and has continued to be supported in the UK for over 28 years because in 1998, predicting protein secondary structure relied on 100's of strange, obscure and individual unix commands. In 1998, the early World_Wide_Web finally allowed the design of Jpred to perform interactive consensus predictions (now called mixtures of experts) to be easy to access for any researcher in any biological laboratory.

In addition to protein secondary structure, JPred also makes predictions of solvent accessibility and coiled-coil regions. The JPred service runs up to 134 000 jobs per month and has carried out over 2 million predictions in total for users in 179 countries.

== JPred 2 ==
The static HTML pages of JPred 2 are still available for reference.

== JPred 3 ==
The JPred v3 followed on from previous versions of JPred developed and maintained by James Cuff and Jonathan Barber (see JPred References). This release added new functionality and fixed many bugs. The highlights are:

- New, friendlier user interface
- Retrained and optimised version of Jnet (v2) - mean secondary structure prediction accuracy of >81%
- Batch submission of jobs
- Better error checking of input sequences/alignments
- Predictions now (optionally) returned via e-mail
- Users may provide their own query names for each submission
- JPred now makes a prediction even when there are no PSI-BLAST hits to the query
- PS/PDF output now incorporates all the predictions

== JPred 4 ==
The current version of JPred (v4) has the following improvements and updates incorporated:

- Retrained on the latest UniRef90 and SCOPe/ASTRAL version of Jnet (v2.3.1) - mean secondary structure prediction accuracy of >82%.
- Upgraded the Web Server to the latest technologies (Bootstrap framework, JavaScript) and updating the web pages – improving the design and usability through implementing responsive technologies.
- Added RESTful API and mass-submission and results retrieval scripts - resulting in peak throughput above 20,000 predictions per day.
- Added prediction jobs monitoring tools.
- Upgraded the results reporting – both, on the web-site, and through the optional email summary reports: improved batch submission, added results summary preview through Jalview results visualization summary in SVG and adding full multiple sequence alignments into the reports.
- Improved help-pages, incorporating tool-tips, and adding one-page step-by-step tutorials.

Sequence residues are categorised or assigned to one of the secondary structure elements, such as alpha-helix, beta-sheet and coiled-coil.

Jnet uses two neural networks for its prediction. The first network is fed with a window of 17 residues over each amino acid in the alignment plus a conservation number. It uses a hidden layer of nine nodes and has three output nodes, one for each secondary structure element. The second network is fed with a window of 19 residues (the result of first network) plus the conservation number. It has a hidden layer with nine nodes and has three output nodes.

== See also ==
- PSIPRED
- List of protein structure prediction software
