= 21st Century Breakdown World Tour =

2009–10 concert tour by Green Day

- World tour by Green Day
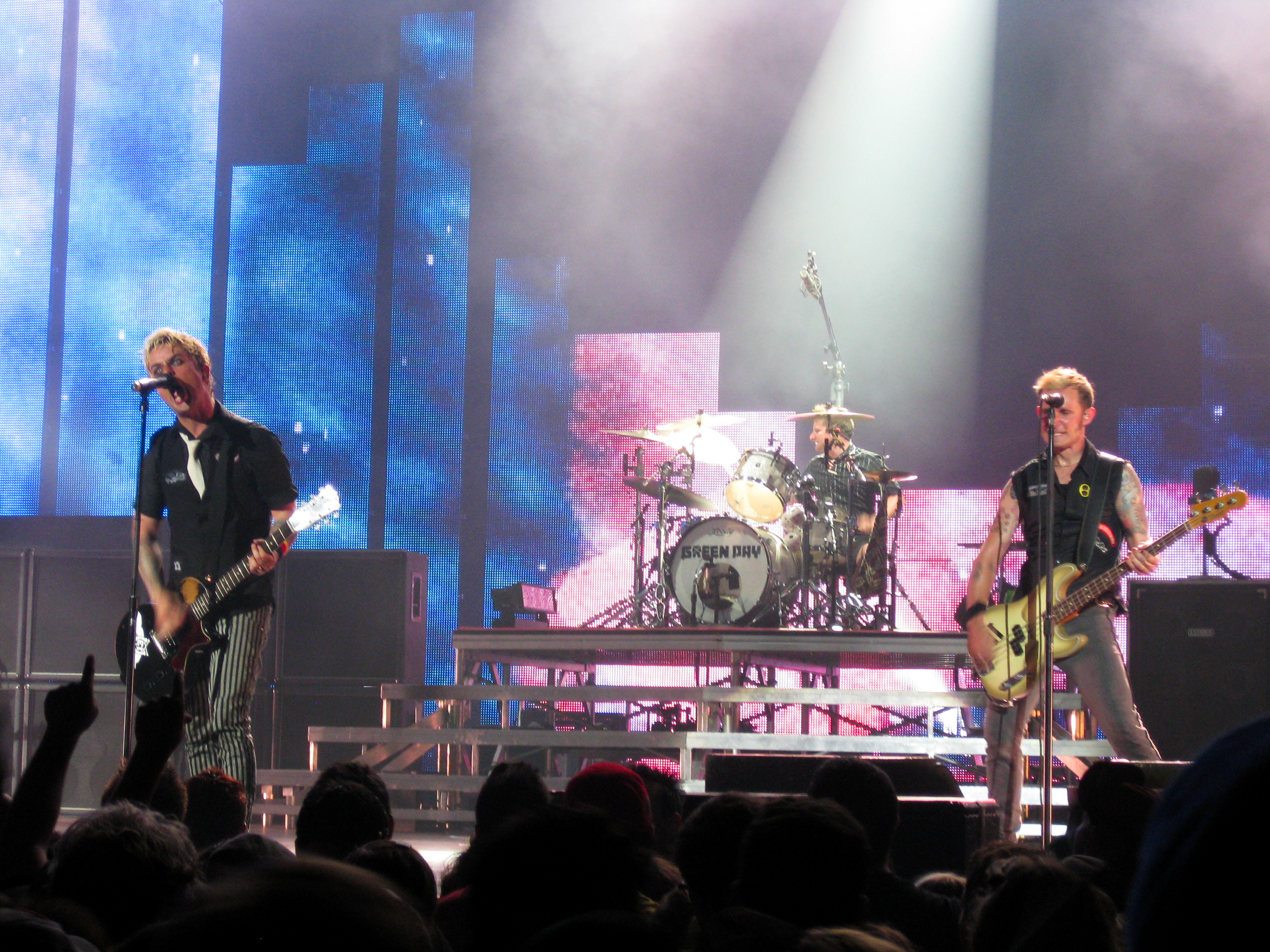
- Green Day performing at the Susquehanna Bank Center in Camden, New Jersey, U.S. on August 3, 2010.
- Location: Europe; Latin America; South America; Oceania; Asia
- Associated album: 21st Century Breakdown
- Start date: July 3, 2009
- End date: October 29, 2010
- Legs: 7
- No. of shows: 132

Green Day concert chronology
- American Idiot World Tour (2004–05); 21st Century Breakdown World Tour (2009–10); 99 Revolutions Tour (2013)

21st Century Breakdown World Tour was a headlining concert tour by American rock band Green Day in support of the group's eighth studio album, 21st Century Breakdown, which was released in May 2009.

The tour began with an eight-week leg throughout North America, kicking off in Seattle in July 2009 and culminating in Los Angeles in late August. The tour in the U.S had 11 stadium shows, making it the most stadiums played in Green Day's entire career until the Hella Mega Tour in 2021. The tour grossed about $64 million. A European leg followed, beginning in Lisbon in late September and wrapping up mid-November in Turin, Italy.

In December 2009, the group toured Australia and New Zealand, followed by Asian dates in January 2010. The group subsequently returned to Europe for a second leg of dates, beginning in late May 2010 with a headline appearance at the Pinkpop Festival in the Netherlands and two stadium shows in the United Kingdom. The tour ended with an appearance at the Rock Werchter festival in Werchter, Belgium in early July. A scheduled performance at the Heineken Jammin' Festival in Venice, Italy on July 4, 2010, was cancelled due to poor weather.

During their performances of "Longview", frontman Billie Joe Armstrong sprayed the front rows with water cannons, shot T-shirts into the crowd and pulled people onstage to sing with the band.

In March 2010, a second North American leg was announced, beginning in Camden, New Jersey, in early August. A final leg of Central and South America followed in October.

A collection of recorded songs from throughout the tour and a bonus DVD of Green Day playing at the Saitama Super Arena in Japan are available on the live album Awesome as Fuck.

== Setlist ==
Typical setlist during the tour.

1. "Song of the Century"
2. "21st Century Breakdown"
3. "Know Your Enemy"
4. "East Jesus Nowhere"
5. "Holiday"
6. "The Static Age"
7. "Before the Lobotomy"
8. "Give Me Novacaine"
9. "Are We the Waiting"
10. "St. Jimmy"
11. "Boulevard of Broken Dreams"
12. "Hitchin' a Ride"
13. "Welcome to Paradise"
14. "When I Come Around"
15. "Brain Stew"
16. "Jaded"
17. "Longview"
18. "Basket Case"
19. "She"
20. "King for a Day"
21. "Shout" (The Isley Brothers cover)
22. "21 Guns"
23. "American Eulogy: Modern World / Mass Hysteria"
24. "Minority"

Encore

25. "American Idiot"
26. "Jesus of Suburbia"
27. "Last Night on Earth"

Encore 2

28. "Wake Me Up When September Ends"
29. "Good Riddance (Time of Your Life)"

== Tour dates ==
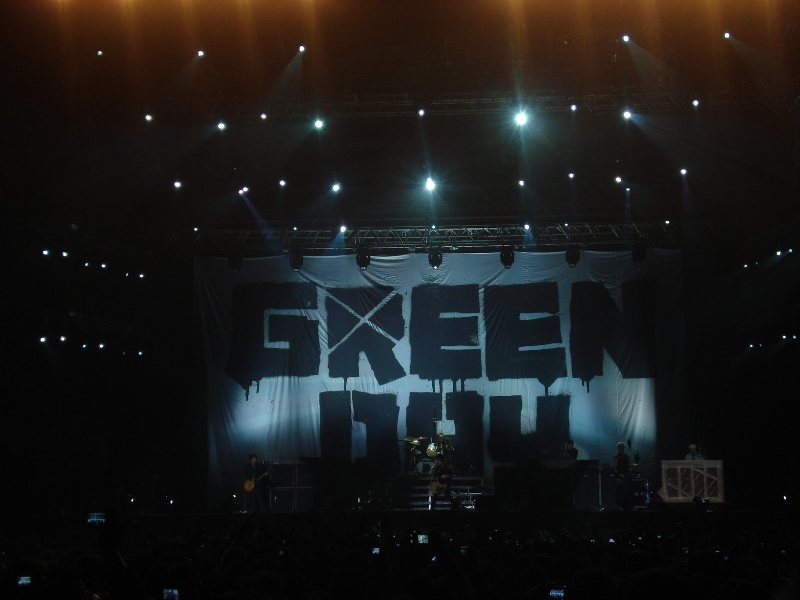
21st Century Breakdown world tour at Estadio San Marcos in Lima, Peru

List of 2009 concerts
Date	City	Country	Venue	Opening acts
July 3, 2009	Seattle	United States	KeyArena	The Bravery
July 4, 2009	Vancouver	Canada	General Motors Place	The Bravery
July 6, 2009	Edmonton	Canada	Rexall Place	The Bravery
July 7, 2009	Saskatoon	Canada	Credit Union Centre	The Bravery
July 9, 2009	Winnipeg	Canada	MTS Centre	The Bravery
July 10, 2009	Fargo	United States	Fargodome	The Bravery
July 11, 2009	Minneapolis	United States	Target Center	The Bravery
July 13, 2009	Chicago	United States	United Center	The Bravery
July 14, 2009	Auburn Hills	United States	The Palace of Auburn Hills	The Bravery
July 16, 2009	Hamilton	Canada	Copps Coliseum	The Bravery
July 17, 2009	Ottawa	Canada	Scotiabank Place	The Bravery
July 18, 2009	Montreal	Canada	Bell Centre	The Bravery
July 20, 2009	Boston	United States	TD Garden	The Bravery
July 21, 2009	Philadelphia	United States	Wachovia Spectrum	The Bravery
July 22, 2009	Pittsburgh	United States	Mellon Arena	—N/a
July 24, 2009	Hartford	United States	XL Center	—N/a
July 25, 2009	Albany	United States	Times Union Center	—N/a
July 27, 2009	New York City	United States	Madison Square Garden	Kaiser Chiefs
July 28, 2009	New York City	United States	Madison Square Garden	Kaiser Chiefs
July 29, 2009	Washington, D.C.	United States	Verizon Center	Kaiser Chiefs
July 31, 2009	Nashville	United States	Sommet Center	Kaiser Chiefs
August 1, 2009	Duluth	United States	Arena at Gwinnett Center	Kaiser Chiefs
August 3, 2009	Tampa	United States	St. Pete Times Forum	Kaiser Chiefs
August 4, 2009	Miami	United States	American Airlines Arena	Kaiser Chiefs
August 5, 2009	Orlando	United States	Amway Arena	Kaiser Chiefs
August 7, 2009	New Orleans	United States	New Orleans Arena	Kaiser Chiefs
August 8, 2009	Houston	United States	Toyota Center	Franz Ferdinand
August 9, 2009	San Antonio	United States	AT&T Center	Franz Ferdinand
August 11, 2009	St. Louis	United States	Scottrade Center	Franz Ferdinand
August 12, 2009	Kansas City	United States	Sprint Center	Franz Ferdinand
August 13, 2009	Omaha	United States	Qwest Center	Franz Ferdinand
August 15, 2009	Denver	United States	Pepsi Center	Franz Ferdinand
August 16, 2009	Salt Lake City	United States	Energy Solutions Arena	Franz Ferdinand
August 18, 2009	San Jose	United States	HP Pavilion	Franz Ferdinand
August 20, 2009	San Diego	United States	Viejas Arena	Franz Ferdinand
August 21, 2009	Las Vegas	United States	Mandalay Bay Events Center	Franz Ferdinand
August 22, 2009	Phoenix	United States	US Airways Center	Franz Ferdinand
August 24, 2009	Sacramento	United States	ARCO Arena	Franz Ferdinand
August 25, 2009	Inglewood	United States	The Forum	Franz Ferdinand
September 28, 2009	Lisbon	Portugal	Pavilhão Atlântico	Prima Donna
September 29, 2009	Madrid	Spain	Palacio de Deportes	Prima Donna
October 1, 2009	Barcelona	Spain	Palau Sant Jordi	Prima Donna
October 2, 2009	Toulouse	France	Le Zénith	Prima Donna
October 4, 2009	Paris	France	Palais Omnisports Bercy	Prima Donna
October 5, 2009	Cologne	Germany	Lanxess Arena	Prima Donna
October 7, 2009	Berlin	Germany	O_{2} World	Prima Donna
October 8, 2009	Hamburg	Germany	Color Line Arena	Prima Donna
October 9, 2009	Copenhagen	Denmark	Forum	Prima Donna
October 11, 2009	Stockholm	Sweden	Ericsson Globe	Prima Donna
October 12, 2009	Oslo	Norway	Oslo Spektrum	Prima Donna; John Olav Nilsen & Gjengen
October 14, 2009	Dortmund	Germany	Westfalenhallen	Prima Donna
October 16, 2009	Rotterdam	Netherlands	Ahoy	Prima Donna
October 17, 2009	Antwerp	Belgium	Sportpaleis	Prima Donna
October 19, 2009	Glasgow	Scotland	SECC	Prima Donna
October 20, 2009	Belfast	Northern Ireland	Odyssey Arena	Prima Donna
October 21, 2009	Dublin	Ireland	The O_{2}	Prima Donna
October 23, 2009	London	England	The O_{2} Arena	Prima Donna
October 24, 2009	London	England	The O_{2} Arena	Prima Donna
October 26, 2009	Sheffield	England	Sheffield Arena	Prima Donna
October 27, 2009	Birmingham	England	LG Arena	Prima Donna
October 28, 2009	Birmingham	England	LG Arena	Prima Donna
October 30, 2009	Manchester	England	Evening News Arena	Prima Donna; Foxboro Hot Tubs
October 31, 2009	Manchester	England	Evening News Arena	Prima Donna; Foxboro Hot Tubs
November 1, 2009	London	England	Wembley Arena	Prima Donna
November 3, 2009	Munich	Germany	Olympiahalle	Prima Donna
November 6, 2009	Vienna	Austria	Wiener Stadthalle	Prima Donna
November 8, 2009	Zürich	Switzerland	Hallenstadion	Prima Donna
November 10, 2009	Milan	Italy	Mediolanum Forum	Prima Donna
November 11, 2009	Bologna	Italy	Futurshow Station	Prima Donna
November 12, 2009	Turin	Italy	PalaOlimpico	Prima Donna
December 4, 2009	Perth	Australia	Burswood Dome	Jet
December 6, 2009	Adelaide	Australia	Adelaide Entertainment Centre	Jet
December 8, 2009	Brisbane	Australia	Brisbane Entertainment Centre	Jet
December 9, 2009	Brisbane	Australia	Brisbane Entertainment Centre	Jet
December 11, 2009	Sydney	Australia	Acer Arena	Jet
December 12, 2009	Sydney	Australia	Acer Arena	Jet
December 14, 2009	Melbourne	Australia	Rod Laver Arena	Jet
December 16, 2009	Melbourne	Australia	Rod Laver Arena	Jet
December 18, 2009	Auckland	New Zealand	Vector Arena	Calling All Cars
December 19, 2009	Auckland	New Zealand	Vector Arena	Calling All Cars

List of 2010 concerts
Date	City	Country	Venue	Opening acts
January 12, 2010	Bangkok	Thailand	Impact Arena	Prima Donna
January 14, 2010	Singapore	Singapore	Singapore Indoor Stadium	Prima Donna
January 16, 2010	Hong Kong	Hong Kong	AsiaWorld-Expo	Prima Donna
January 18, 2010	Seoul	South Korea	Olympic Gymnastics Arena	Prima Donna
January 21, 2010	Osaka	Japan	Osaka-jō Hall	Prima Donna
January 23, 2010	Saitama	Japan	Saitama Super Arena	Prima Donna
January 24, 2010	Saitama	Japan	Saitama Super Arena	Prima Donna
January 25, 2010	Nagoya	Japan	Nippon Gaishi Hall	Prima Donna
May 29, 2010	Landgraaf	Netherlands	Pinkpop Festival	—N/a
May 30, 2010	Hanover	Germany	TUI Arena	Donots
June 2, 2010	Skive	Denmark	Skive Festival	—N/a
June 4, 2010	Oslo	Norway	Ullevaal Stadion	Joan Jett and the Blackhearts
June 5, 2010	Gothenburg	Sweden	Ullevi Stadion	Joan Jett and the Blackhearts; Johnossi
June 8, 2010	Helsinki	Finland	Kyläsaari	Joan Jett and the Blackhearts; The Hives
June 11, 2010	Munich	Germany	Olympia-Reitstadion	Joan Jett and the Blackhearts; Donots
June 12, 2010	Nickelsdorf	Austria	Nova Rock Festival	Joan Jett and the Blackhearts
June 16, 2010	Manchester	England	Old Trafford Cricket Ground	Joan Jett and the Blackhearts; Frank Turner
June 19, 2010	London	England	Wembley Stadium	Joan Jett and the Blackhearts; Frank Turner
June 21, 2010	Glasgow	Scotland	Scottish Exhibition and Conference Centre	Joan Jett and the Blackhearts
June 23, 2010	Dublin	Ireland	Marlay Park	Joan Jett and the Blackhearts; Paramore
June 26, 2010	Paris	France	Parc des Princes	Paramore; Billy Talent
June 29, 2010	Prague	Czech Republic	Vystaviste Holesovice	Billy Talent; The Pooh
July 1, 2010	Mainz	Germany	Messepark	Rise Against; Donots
July 2, 2010	Werchter	Belgium	Rock Werchter Festival	—N/a
August 3, 2010	Camden	United States	Susquehanna Bank Center	AFI
August 5, 2010	Darien	United States	Darien Lake Performing Arts Center	AFI
August 7, 2010	Chicago	United States	Lollapalooza Festival	AFI
August 9, 2010	Alpharetta	United States	Verizon Wireless Amphitheatre	AFI
August 11, 2010	Bristow	United States	Jiffy Lube Live	AFI
August 12, 2010	Hartford	United States	Comcast Theatre	AFI
August 14, 2010	Holmdel	United States	PNC Bank Arts Center	AFI
August 16, 2010	Mansfield	United States	Comcast Center	AFI
August 18, 2010	Toronto	Canada	Molson Canadian Amphitheatre	AFI
August 20, 2010	Quebec City	Canada	L'Agora du Vieux-Port	AFI
August 21, 2010	Montreal	Canada	Quai Jacques-Cartier	AFI
August 23, 2010	Clarkston	United States	DTE Energy Music Theatre	AFI
August 26, 2010	Dallas	United States	SuperPages.com Center	AFI
August 28, 2010	Greenwood Village	United States	Comfort Dental Amphitheatre	AFI
August 30, 2010	Phoenix	United States	Cricket Wireless Pavilion	AFI
August 31, 2010	Irvine	United States	Verizon Wireless Amphitheatre	AFI
September 2, 2010	Chula Vista	United States	Cricket Wireless Amphitheatre	AFI
September 4, 2010	Mountain View	United States	Shoreline Amphitheatre	AFI
October 8, 2010	Caracas	Venezuela	Estadio de Fútbol de la Universidad Simón Bolívar	Lado B
October 10, 2010	Cajicá	Colombia	Nem-Catacoa Festival	Don Tetto
October 13, 2010	Porto Alegre	Brazil	Gigantinho	Superguidis
October 15, 2010	Rio de Janeiro	Brazil	HSBC Arena	—N/a
October 17, 2010	Brasília	Brazil	Ginásio Nilson Nelson	Tiro Williams
October 20, 2010	São Paulo	Brazil	Arena Anhembi	Nevilton
October 22, 2010	Buenos Aires	Argentina	Pepsi Music Festival, Costanera Sur	Massacre
October 24, 2010	Santiago	Chile	Estadio Bicentenario de La Florida	Attaque 77
October 26, 2010	Lima	Peru	Estadio Universidad San Marcos	Vaselina
October 29, 2010	San José	Costa Rica	Estadio Ricardo Saprissa Aymá	—N/a

=== Cancelled tour dates ===
- July 4, 2010 – Heineken Jammin' Festival in Venice, Italy (cancelled due to bad weather)
