= Awesome as Fuck =

Live album by Green Day
- Released: March 22, 2011
- Recorded: 2009–2010
- Venues: Saitama Super Arena, Saitama
- Genre: Punk rock
- Length: 146:56 (CD + DVD or Blu Ray)
- Label: Reprise
- Producer: Green Day

Green Day chronology
American Idiot: The Original Broadway Cast Recording (2010)	Awesome as Fuck (2011)	Oh Love E.P. (2012)

Singles from Awesome as Fuck
- 1. "Cigarettes and Valentines (Live)" Released: February 21, 2011 (promo); 2. "21 Guns (Live)" Released: 2011 (promo)

Awesome as Fuck (marketed as Awesome as F**k, Awesome as ****, or Awesome: Live) is a live album by American rock band Green Day, released on March 22, 2011, by Reprise Records. The album is composed of tracks recorded during Green Day's 2009–10 21st Century Breakdown World Tour in support of their eighth studio album, 21st Century Breakdown (2009). It includes a DVD of a concert recorded at the Saitama Super Arena in Saitama, Japan. It is also available in Blu-ray.

== Reception ==
Professional ratings
Aggregate scores
Source	Rating
Metacritic	64/100
Review scores
Source	Rating
Allmusic	3/5 stars
The A.V. Club	B
Consequence of Sound	C+
Entertainment Weekly	C
Kerrang!	3/5 stars
Mojo	2/5 stars
PopMatters	6/10 stars
Q	3/5 stars
Rolling Stone	3.5/5 stars
Sputnikmusic	2/5

At Metacritic, which assigns a normalized rating out of 100 to reviews from mainstream publications, the album received an average score of 64, which indicates "generally favorable reviews". Stephen Thomas Erlewine of Allmusic remarked that Awesome as Fuck "satisfies without surprising [...] The set list is a good mix that leans heavily on Green Day's new millennium standards and the bandmembers never sound tired playing: they hit their marks with enthusiasm, which is enough to make Awesome as F**k fun, if not quite a live album for the ages." David Fricke of Rolling Stone commented "This set is a contagious account of the power-fun streak that still runs through the band even after the two punk operas [...] Billie Joe Armstrong thoroughly enjoys his spotlight: shouting, cursing and letting audiences take whole verses of 'American Idiot' and 'Good Riddance.' And drummer Tré Cool is way up in the mix, channeling the Clash's Topper Headon and the Who's Keith Moon with precise demonic glee."

Chris Conaton of PopMatters said that the album "has a bit of the odor of a record-company stopgap about it", noting the five-year gap between the band's last two studio albums, American Idiot (2004) and 21st Century Breakdown (2009), that was filled by the live album and DVD Bullet in a Bible (2005). He noted that the band was "at least trying to do something different" with this second live album: Bullet in a Bible's album and video documented a single two-night stand in England, while Awesome as Fuck's album draws from sixteen different concerts around the world and the video is taken from a single show. He also remarked that the album's track list contains "treats for longtime fans" in the form of "some of the band's lesser singles and even some deep album tracks"—including the previously unreleased "Cigarettes and Valentines" and the older tracks "Burnout", "Going to Pasalacqua", "J.A.R.", and "Who Wrote Holden Caulfield?"—saying "It's this quintet of songs that really sets Awesome as F**k apart and gives it a kick as a live set." He criticized the fact that hearing the songs played live was not that different from hearing the studio recordings, calling them "generally the same beyond Armstrong telling the crowd to sing this part or that" and remarking that Green Day's arena show is "a wonderful experience in person, but it understandably loses something in the translation to CD and DVD."

== Track listing ==
=== Album ===
All lyrics are written by Billie Joe Armstrong except where noted; all music is composed by Green Day (Armstrong, Mike Dirnt, and Tré Cool) except where noted.

No.	Title	Location	Length
1.	"21st Century Breakdown"	Wembley Stadium, London, England (June 19, 2010)	5:51
2.	"Know Your Enemy"	Old Trafford Cricket Ground, Manchester, England (June 16, 2010)	4:50
3.	"East Jesus Nowhere"	Scottish Exhibition and Conference Centre, Glasgow, Scotland (June 21, 2010)	5:09
4.	"Holiday"	Marlay Park, Dublin, Republic of Ireland (June 23, 2010)	4:16
5.	"¡Viva la Gloria!"	SuperPages.com Center, Dallas, Texas, United States (August 26, 2010)	4:12
6.	"Cigarettes and Valentines"	Cricket Wireless Pavilion, Phoenix, Arizona, United States (August 30, 2010)	2:44
7.	"Burnout"	Verizon Wireless Amphitheater, Irvine, California, United States (August 31, 2010)	2:16
8.	"Going to Pasalacqua" (music by Armstrong, Dirnt, and John Kiffmeyer)	Cricket Wireless Amphitheatre, Chula Vista, California, United States (September 2, 2010)	4:02
9.	"J.A.R. (Jason Andrew Relva)" (lyrics by Dirnt)	DTE Energy Music Theatre, Clarkston, Michigan, United States (August 23, 2010)	2:44
10.	"Who Wrote Holden Caulfield?"	Madison Square Garden, New York, New York, United States (July 28, 2009)	3:22
11.	"Geek Stink Breath"	Saitama Super Arena, Chūō-ku, Saitama, Saitama Prefecture, Japan (January 23, 2010)	2:07
12.	"When I Come Around"	O2 World, Berlin, Germany (October 7, 2009)	3:11
13.	"She"	Brisbane Entertainment Centre, Brisbane, Queensland, Australia (December 8, 2009)	2:40
14.	"21 Guns"	Shoreline Amphitheatre, Mountain View, California, United States (September 4, 2010)	5:56
15.	"American Idiot"	Quai Jacques-Cartier, Montreal, Quebec, Canada (August 21, 2010)	4:23
16.	"Wake Me Up When September Ends"	Pannonia Fields II, Nickelsdorf, Burgenland, Austria (June 12, 2010)	3:11
17.	"Good Riddance (Time of Your Life)"	Pannonia Fields II, Nickelsdorf, Burgenland, Austria (June 12, 2010)	3:00
Total length:			63:46

Deluxe edition bonus tracks
No.	Title	Location	Length
18.	"Letterbomb"	Cricket Wireless Amphitheatre, Chula Vista, California, United States (September 2, 2010)	4:34
19.	"Christie Road"	XL Center, Hartford, Connecticut, United States (July 24, 2009)	4:01
Total length:			72:21

iTunes deluxe edition bonus tracks
No.	Title	Location	Length
20.	"Paper Lanterns / 2,000 Light Years Away" ("Paper Lanterns" music by Armstrong, Dirnt, and Kiffmeyer "2,000 Light Years Away" music composed by Green Day, Jesse Michaels, Pete Rypins and Dave "E.C." Henwood)	Verizon Wireless Amphitheatre, Alpharetta, Georgia, United States (August 9, 2010)	6:00
Total length:			78:21

=== Video ===
All lyrics are written by Billie Joe Armstrong except where noted; all music is composed by Green Day (Armstrong, Mike Dirnt, and Tré Cool) except where noted.

Live at the Saitama Super Arena, Chūō-ku, Saitama, Saitama Prefecture, Japan on January 23 & 24, 2010
No.	Title	Length
1.	"21st Century Breakdown"
2.	"Know Your Enemy"
3.	"East Jesus Nowhere"
4.	"Holiday"
5.	"The Static Age"
6.	"¡Viva la Gloria!"
7.	"Boulevard of Broken Dreams"
8.	"Burnout"
9.	"Geek Stink Breath"
10.	"Welcome to Paradise"
11.	"When I Come Around"
12.	"My Generation" (music and lyrics by Pete Townshend, originally performed by The Who)
13.	"She"
14.	"21 Guns"
15.	"American Eulogy"
16.	"Jesus of Suburbia"
17.	"Good Riddance (Time of Your Life)"

Live at the Cricket Wireless Pavilion, Phoenix, Arizona on August 30, 2010
No.	Title	Length
18.	"Cigarettes and Valentines"

80 Mins Approx.

== Personnel ==
=== Band ===
- Billie Joe Armstrong – lead vocals, guitar
- Mike Dirnt – bass guitar, backing vocals, co-lead vocals on Jesus of Suburbia and American Eulogy
- Tré Cool – drums

=== Additional musicians ===
- Jason White – guitars, backing vocals
- Jason Freese – keyboards, horns, backing vocals
- Jeff Matika – guitar, backing vocals

=== Production ===
==== Album ====
- Chris Dugan – mix engineer
- Ted Jensen – mastering
- Kevin Lemoine – recording engineer
- Brad Kobylckzak – recording engineer
- Mike Manning – assistant engineer
- Kumar Butler – assistant engineer
- Sergio Almonte – assistant engineer
- Nick Tresko – assistant engineer
- Ben Hirschfield – assistant engineer

==== Video ====
- Chris Dugan – director
- Bill Berg-Hillinger – director, editor, colorist
- Ryan Cooke – additional editor
- Michael Mastrangelo – additional editor
- Carl Jordan – additional editor
- Tammy Berg – additional editor
- Bill Butterfield – additional editor
- Chris Johnston – post-audio mixing
- David May – post producer
- Justin Lomax – editor of "Cigarettes and Valentines"
- Shane Ruggieri – colorist of "Cigarettes and Valentines"

==== Artwork ====
- Chris Bilheimer – art direction
- Chris Dugan – photography

== Charts ==
Weekly chart performance for Awesome as Fuck
Chart (2011)	Peak position
Argentinean Albums (CAPIF)	1
Australian Albums (ARIA)	69
Australian Music DVD (ARIA)	1
Austrian Albums (Ö3 Austria)	8
Belgian Albums (Ultratop Flanders)	19
Belgian Albums (Ultratop Wallonia)	20
Canadian Albums (Billboard)	12
Danish Albums (Hitlisten)	17
Dutch Albums (Album Top 100)	9
Finnish Albums (Suomen virallinen lista)	20
French Albums (SNEP)	16
German Albums (Offizielle Top 100)	5
Greek Albums (IFPI Greece)	9
Hungarian Albums (Mahasz)	12
Irish Albums (IRMA)	9
Italian Albums (FIMI)	4
Japanese Albums (Oricon)	11
Mexican Albums (AMPROFON)	12
Norwegian Albums (VG-lista)	4
Polish Albums (ZPAV)	17
Portuguese Albums (AFP)	8
Scottish Albums (Official Charts)	9
Spanish Albums (Promusicae)	5
Swedish Albums (Sverigetopplistan)	9
Swiss Albums (Schweizer Hitparade)	11
UK Albums (Official Charts)	14
UK Rock & Metal Albums (Official Charts)	1
US Billboard 200	14
US Top Rock Albums (Billboard)	4

== Certifications and sales ==
Certifications and sales for Awesome as Fuck (album)
Region	Certification	Certified units/sales
United Kingdom (BPI)	Gold	100,000^{‡}
^{‡} Sales+streaming figures based on certification alone.

Certifications and sales for Awesome as Fuck (video album)
Region	Certification	Certified units/sales
Germany (BVMI)	Gold	25,000^{^}
^{^} Shipments figures based on certification alone.
