= American Idiot (disambiguation) =

American Idiot is a 2004 album by Green Day.

American Idiot may also refer to:

- "American Idiot" (song), a song from the album
- American Idiot (musical), a musical based on the album
  - American Idiot: The Original Broadway Cast Recording, the cast recording of the musical

== See also ==
- American Idiots, a 2013 comedy film with Caroline D'Amore
