= Last Night on Earth: Live in Tokyo =

2009 album by Green Day

EP / live album by Green Day
- Released: November 11, 2009
- Recorded: May 28, 2009
- Venue: Akasaka BLITZ, Tokyo, Japan
- Genre: Punk rock; pop punk; alternative rock
- Length: 27:48
- Label: Reprise

Green Day chronology
21st Century Breakdown (2009)	Last Night on Earth: Live in Tokyo (2009)	American Idiot: The Original Broadway Cast Recording (2010)

Last Night on Earth: Live in Tokyo is a live EP by the American rock band Green Day, recorded live at the Akasaka BLITZ, Tokyo, Japan on May 28, 2009. It was released in Japan and iTunes on November 11, 2009, and was later released as an import in other countries on December 1, 2009. The EP got to No. 31 in Japan on the Oricon Weekly Charts and got to number 197 on the Billboard Top 200. Only two songs ("Basket Case" and "Geek Stink Breath") from the live EP were not from 21st Century Breakdown. Although titled after "Last Night on Earth" from 21st Century Breakdown, the song is not featured on this extended play or on the setlist of the venue.

== Track listing ==
All lyrics are written by Billie Joe Armstrong; all music is composed by Green Day.

No.	Title	Length
1.	"21st Century Breakdown"	6:16
2.	"Know Your Enemy" (Japan only)	3:57
3.	"Last of the American Girls"	3:54
4.	"21 Guns"	5:02
5.	"American Eulogy" (A. "Mass Hysteria" / B. "Modern World")	3:32
6.	"Basket Case"	3:03
7.	"Geek Stink Breath"	2:04

== Personnel ==
- Billie Joe Armstrong –lead vocals, guitar, piano
- Mike Dirnt – bass guitar, backing vocals; lead vocals on "Modern World" (section in "American Eulogy")
- Tré Cool – drums, percussion
