= Chris Dugan =

American drummer

- Born: May 11, 1973 (age 53)
- Genres: Punk rock, pop-punk
- Occupations: Audio engineer; cinematographer; record producer; musician; singer
- Instruments: Drums; keyboards
- Years active: 1996–present
- Labels: Lookout!; Adeline; Recess; Reprise
- Member of: The Network; The Coverups

Chris Dugan (born May 11, 1973) is an American audio engineer, cinematographer, record producer, musician, and singer, best known as the drummer of the Effection and as an audio engineer for Green Day. In 2018, along with Green Day members Billie Joe Armstrong and Mike Dirnt, guitarist Jason White, and tour manager Bill Schneider, he formed the Coverups, for which he plays drums.

== History ==
Dugan began his musical pursuits as a drummer. Needing to be resourceful, he learned to do basic recordings for his high school bands. Engineering was an instinctual progression and it was the purist recording styles of the '60s and '70s that really inspired him. In 1996, he opened Nu-Tone Studios in Pittsburg, California, with fellow engineer Willie Samuels, renting space from local Studio 880 in Oakland. Nu-Tone quickly became an indie band favorite, drawing the local rock scene and labels like Lookout!, Adeline, and Alternative Tentacles. In 2002, Dugan began engineering for Green Day at Jingletown Recording. In 2003, the Effection, with Dugan as the band's drummer, released the album Soundtrack to a Moment via Adeline Records. In 2009, he won his first Grammy with Green Day's 21st Century Breakdown for Best Rock Album.

Dugan currently resides in Oakland, California with his wife, Mari Tanaka, and their 2 daughters.

== Projects ==
Dugan has worked with bands such as U2, Iggy Pop, Green Day, and Smash Mouth. He has also worked with producers Rob Cavallo, Butch Vig, Bob Ezrin, and Jeff Saltzman. In 2009, he won the Grammy for Best Rock Album of the Year for engineering Green Day’s 21st Century Breakdown. In 2010, he won the Grammy for Best Musical Show Album for engineering Green Day’s American Idiot: The Original Broadway Cast Recording.

== Partial discography ==
Year	Artist	Release	Producer	Engineer	Mixing
2024	Pinhead Gunpowder	Unt		Yes	Yes
2024	The Dopamines	80/20	Yes	Yes	Yes
2024	Green Day	"Saviors"		Yes	
2024	Liily	MORE (single)			Yes
2023	The Gaslight Anthem	History Books (Expanded Edition)			Yes
2022	Charger	Warhorse	Yes	Yes	Yes
2022	Weezer	SZNZ: Autumn			Yes
2021	The Wallflowers	Exit Wounds			Yes
2020	Alanis Morissette	Such Pretty Forks In The Road			Yes
2020	Matt Nathanson	Live in Paradise: Boston			Yes
2020	Green Day	Father of All...	Yes	Yes	Yes
2018	Swingin' Utters	Peace and Love	Yes	Yes	Yes
2016	Green Day	Revolution Radio		Yes	
2014	Green Day	Demolicious		Yes	Yes
2014	Swingin' Utters	Fistful Of Hollow	Yes	Yes	Yes
2013	Billie Joe Armstrong & Norah Jones	Foreverly		Yes	Yes
2012	Green Day	¡Uno!		Yes	
2012	Green Day	¡Dos!		Yes	
2012	Green Day	¡Tré!		Yes	
2011	Green Day	Awesome As Fuck			Yes
2010	American Idiot Broadway Cast & Green Day	American Idiot – Original Broadway Cast Recording		Yes	
2009	Green Day	21st Century Breakdown		Yes	
2009	Green Day	Last Night on Earth: Live in Tokyo			Yes
2008	Foxboro Hot Tubs	Stop Drop and Roll!!!		Yes	Yes
2007	Lillix	Inside The Hollow		Yes	
2006	U2 and Green Day	The Saints Are Coming		Yes	
2006	Smash Mouth	Summer Girl			Yes
2004	Green Day	American Idiot		Yes	
2004	Lars Frederiksen & the Bastards	Viking		Yes	
2003	The Network	Money Money 2020		Yes	Yes
2003	Iggy Pop	Skull Ring		Yes	Yes
2002	The Enemies	Seize The Day	Yes	Yes	Yes
2002	The Frustrators	Achtung Jackass		Yes	Yes

== Other work ==
- 2009 – Video: – Green Day – "East Jesus Nowhere" – Director, Camera, Photography
- 2012 – Video: – Green Day – Awesome As Fuck – Director
