= American Idiot (musical) =

Musical based on the Green Day album

- Broadway promotional poster
- Music: Green Day
- Lyrics: Billie Joe Armstrong
- Book: Billie Joe Armstrong; Michael Mayer
- Basis: American Idiot by Green Day
- Premiere: September 4, 2009: Berkeley Repertory Theatre, Berkeley
- Productions: 2009 Berkeley; 2010 Broadway; 2011 First US tour 2012 First UK and Ireland tour 2012 Second US tour 2013 Third US tour 2015 West End; 2016 Second UK tour 2019 Third UK tour
- Awards: Grammy Award for Best Musical Show Album

American Idiot is a sung-through rock musical based on the 2004 concept album of the same name by rock band Green Day. After a run at the Berkeley Repertory Theatre in 2009, the show moved to the St. James Theatre on Broadway. Previews began on March 24, 2010, and the musical officially opened on April 20, 2010. The show closed on April 24, 2011, after 422 performances. While Green Day did not appear in the production, vocalist/guitarist Billie Joe Armstrong performed the role of St. Jimmy occasionally throughout the run.

The story, expanded from that of the album by Armstrong and director Michael Mayer, centers on three disaffected young men, Johnny, Will, and Tunny. Johnny and Tunny flee a stifling suburban lifestyle and parental restrictions, while Will stays at home to work out his relationship with his pregnant girlfriend, Heather. The former pair look for meaning in life and try out the freedom and excitement of the city. Tunny quickly gives up on life in the city, joins the military and is shipped off to war. Johnny turns to drugs and finds a part of himself that he grows to dislike, has a relationship and experiences lost love.

The book was written by Armstrong and director Michael Mayer. The music was composed by Green Day and the lyrics were by Armstrong. The score included all the songs from the band's original American Idiot album, as well as additional Green Day songs from the 2009 concept album 21st Century Breakdown, and "When It's Time", a song originally only released as a single in Britain.

The musical won two Tony Awards: Best Scenic Design of a Musical for Christine Jones and Best Lighting Design of a Musical for Kevin Adams. It also received a nomination for Best Musical. In 2011, its Broadway cast recording won a Grammy Award for Best Musical Show Album.

== Plot ==
Set in the early 2000s, the musical opens with a group of suburban youths living unhappily in "Jingletown, USA". Fed up with the state of the union, the company explodes in frustration during "American Idiot". One of the youths, Johnny, begins to tell his story in "Jesus of Suburbia", revealing he comes from a broken home and feels dissatisfied with the world. He soon goes to commiserate with his friend Will, and a third friend, Tunny, joins the two at Will's house. As they party and get drunk they run out of beer, prompting them to pick up more at the local 7-Eleven. Tunny exposes the do-nothing go-nowhere quicksand of their lives in the "City of the Damned". Realizing they are not going anywhere, Johnny challenges his friends to start caring about their lives and everything around them ("I Don't Care"). Will's girlfriend, Heather, finds out that she is pregnant with Will's child, and expresses her conflicting feelings in "Dearly Beloved". Johnny borrows money and buys bus tickets to the city for the three young men, eager to escape suburbia. Before the boys are able to leave, Heather tells Will of her pregnancy. With no other choice, he tells his friends he must stay at home in "Tales of Another Broken Home". Johnny and Tunny depart for the city with a group of other jaded youths ("Holiday").

Johnny's dreams and expectations of the city have fallen short so far, and he walks around the city to establish more of a bond with it. While wandering the streets alone, he pines for a woman he sees in an apartment window ("Boulevard of Broken Dreams"). While Tunny finds it hard to adjust to urban life, he spends his time watching television and is seduced by advertisements featuring America's favorite son, an attractive and masculine all-American sex symbol. He becomes convinced that the favorite son is everything he wants to be as well. The favorite son is revealed to be an American soldier ("Favorite Son"). Believing that joining the military will give Tunny the purpose he believed Johnny and the city would give him, Tunny enlists ("Are We the Waiting").

Back in the city, a frustrated Johnny manifests a rebellious drug-dealing alter ego called St. Jimmy, who is the carefree punk Johnny has always wanted to be. Johnny takes party drugs for the first time during "St. Jimmy". His new-found courage thanks to St. Jimmy and the drugs allow Johnny to make a successful move on the girl in the window. Two weeks later, Johnny admits he has injected heroin for the first time and spends the night with the girl he saw in the window, whom he calls "Whatsername". Back in Jingletown, Will sits on the couch drinking beer as Heather's pregnancy progresses. Meanwhile, Tunny is deployed to a war zone, and is shot and wounded. Will and Tunny beg for relief in "Give Me Novacaine".

Johnny is smitten with Whatsername and they go to a club together to celebrate, but St. Jimmy has other plans for them in "Last of the American Girls / She's a Rebel". St. Jimmy hands Johnny heroin and Johnny pressures Whatsername into injecting with him. St. Jimmy sets the mood, Whatsername expresses her trust in Johnny, and Heather pledges her love to her newborn baby in "Last Night on Earth".

Will is increasingly neglectful as Heather devotes herself to caring for their baby. Heather has had enough of Will's pot-and-alcohol-fuelled apathy. Despite Will's protestations, she takes the baby and walks out ("Too Much, Too Soon"). At around the same time, lying in a bed in an army hospital surrounded by fellow injured soldiers, Tunny falls victim to the hopelessness he has seen during wartime ("Before the Lobotomy"). Tunny hallucinates while on medication and imagines he and his nurse engaging in a balletic aerial dance ("Extraordinary Girl"). He quickly falls in love with her. His hallucination disappears, and he's left with his fellow soldiers in agony ("Before the Lobotomy (Reprise)").

Back in the city, Johnny refuses some dope from Jimmy and instead chooses to reveal the depth of his love for Whatsername as she sleeps ("When It's Time"). His relationship with Whatsername threatens the very existence of St. Jimmy, and so Jimmy forces Johnny to become increasingly erratic, and amidst hallucinations and paranoid delusions, Johnny threatens Whatsername and then himself with a knife ("Know Your Enemy"). Whatsername attempts to convince Johnny to get help, while the Extraordinary Girl tends to Tunny's physical and emotional wounds as it is revealed that Tunny is now an amputee, and Heather and her baby are far away from Will who sits alone on his couch ("21 Guns"). Jimmy makes Johnny leave a note for Whatsername, saying he has chosen St. Jimmy and drugs over her. Angry and done, Whatsername tells Johnny that he is not the "Jesus of Suburbia" and reveals that St. Jimmy is nothing more than "a figment of [his] father's rage and [his] mother's love" ("Letterbomb"). She leaves him and his unwillingness to acknowledge his issues behind.

Hurt by Whatsername's departure, Johnny longs for better days ahead, Tunny longs for home, and Will longs for all the things he's lost ("Wake Me Up When September Ends"). St. Jimmy appears and makes one last attempt to get Johnny's attention, but Johnny has made the conscious decision to end his self destruction, resulting in the metaphorical suicide of St. Jimmy ("The Death of St. Jimmy"). Johnny cleans up and gets a desk job but realizes there is no place for him there or in the city ("East 12th St."). Will, all alone with his television, bemoans his outcast state ("Nobody Likes You"). Will imagines Heather appearing with her new show-off rockstar boyfriend who is much cooler than Will ("Rock and Roll Girlfriend"). Sick of staying on his couch, Will heads to the 7-Eleven and, surprisingly, finds Johnny there. Johnny had sold his guitar for a bus ticket home. Tunny also appears at the 7-Eleven, having returned from deployment with the Extraordinary Girl. Johnny becomes furious with Tunny for leaving him in the city, but quickly forgives him, and the three friends embrace. Tunny introduces his friends to the Extraordinary Girl. Heather and her rockstar boyfriend arrive in style, and in an uneasy truce, she allows Will to hold their baby. Other friends show up to greet the three men they haven't seen in a year ("We're Coming Home Again"). One year later, Johnny laments that he lost the love of his life, but he accepts that he can live with the struggle between rage and love that has defined his life. With this acceptance comes the possibility of hope ("Whatsername").

After the cast takes their bows, the curtain rises to reveal the entire company with guitars, and they perform "Good Riddance (Time of Your Life)". Each performance of this song was recorded and given to the audience as a free digital download.

== Characters and cast members ==
The principal cast members of the major productions of American Idiot.

Character	Berkeley	Broadway	West End
Character	2009	2010	2015
Johnny	John Gallagher Jr.	John Gallagher Jr.	Aaron Sidwell
Johnny	The main protagonist of the story. On his picaresque journey, he experiences nihilism, drug abuse, and lost love.		
Tunny	Matt Caplan	Stark Sands	Alexis Gerred
Tunny	Johnny's friend. He accompanies Johnny to the city, but soon joins the military and is sent to war. Tunny suffers serious injuries and loses a leg. During his rehabilitation, he falls in love with his nurse, and she returns home with him.		
Will	Michael Esper	Michael Esper	Steve Rushton
Will	Johnny's friend. He plans to leave town with the group until his girlfriend, Heather, reveals that she is pregnant with his child. Will stays at home in an alcohol-and drug-infused depression.		
St. Jimmy	Tony Vincent	Tony Vincent	Lucas Rush
St. Jimmy	An adventurous drug dealer who is eventually revealed to be a drug-addled manifestation of Johnny's id. He was occasionally portrayed by Green Day's lead singer and guitarist Billie Joe Armstrong.		
Whatsername	Rebecca Naomi Jones	Rebecca Naomi Jones	Amelia Lily
Whatsername	An attractive young woman who accompanies Johnny on his journey. She eventually realizes that their relationship is destructive and leaves him.		
Heather	Mary Faber	Mary Faber	Natasha Barnes
Heather	Will's pregnant girlfriend. She leaves Will and begins a relationship with a rock and roll boyfriend, eventually leading a life of glamour in stark contrast with Will's depression.		
The Extraordinary Girl	Christina Sajous	Christina Sajous	Raquel Jones
The Extraordinary Girl	Tunny's rehab nurse. The two fall in love.		
The Favorite Son	Joshua Henry	Joshua Henry	Ross William Wild
The Favorite Son	An American soldier televised in advertisements.		

== Background ==
In 2000, Green Day released the album Warning. Village Voice music critic Robert Christgau compared Warning to the band's previous album (Nimrod), and noted that "[Billie Joe Armstrong is] abandoning the first person. He's assuming fictional personas. And he's creating for himself the voice of a thinking left-liberal." Christgau also detected "a faint whiff" of the work of the theatrical composer/lyricist team of Kurt Weill and Bertolt Brecht. The trend of writing in the third person came to fruition with Green Day's next studio album, American Idiot in 2004. The first new song Green Day wrote was the single "American Idiot".

One day, bassist Mike Dirnt was in the studio recording a 30-second song by himself. Armstrong decided that he wanted to do the same, and drummer Tré Cool followed suit. Armstrong recalled, "It started getting more serious as we tried to outdo one another. We kept connecting these little half-minute bits until we had something." This musical suite became "Homecoming", and the group subsequently wrote another suite, "Jesus of Suburbia".

Green Day made the record an album-long conceptual piece, which was a response to the realities of the post-9/11 era. The band took inspiration from the concept albums by The Who, sources in the musical theater repertoire like The Rocky Horror Show and West Side Story, and the concept album-come-stage musical Jesus Christ Superstar. Armstrong also said the band intended "that it would be staged or we'd create a film or something... we were thinking in terms that it kind of felt like scoring a movie."

Director Michael Mayer heard the album and expressed an interest in adapting it for the stage. When he approached the band regarding a collaboration, they agreed to work with him. The band also gave Mayer a wide latitude for his adaptation after seeing his earlier work in Spring Awakening. Though additional songs were included from the Green Day catalogue, Mayer added very little dialogue to the show. He felt instead that the music and lyrics were expressive enough on their own, and even removed some of the dialogue that was part of the Berkeley production before the show moved to Broadway.

== Production history ==
=== Berkeley (2009) ===
The musical premiered at the Berkeley Repertory Theatre. Previews began on September 4, 2009, and the official opening was on September 15, 2009. After becoming the top-grossing show in the theatre's history, the producers extended the limited run twice to November 15, 2009. The cast included John Gallagher Jr. as Johnny, Matt Caplan as Tunny, Michael Esper as Will, Tony Vincent as St. Jimmy, Rebecca Naomi Jones as Whatsername, Mary Faber as Heather, and Christina Sajous as the Extraordinary Girl.

=== Broadway (2010–2011) ===
The musical transferred to the St. James Theatre on Broadway, with previews beginning on March 24, 2010. It officially opened on April 20, 2010. The cast for the Berkeley Repertory production was retained for the Broadway production with the exception of Caplan, who was replaced by Stark Sands. It was rumored that the show cost between $8 million and $10 million to produce. After six months of performances, the show was "still a ways off from possibly turning a profit" according to a New York Times report. As a part of the promotion for the show, the cast performed "21 Guns" at the 52nd Annual Grammy Awards on January 31, 2010, with Green Day.

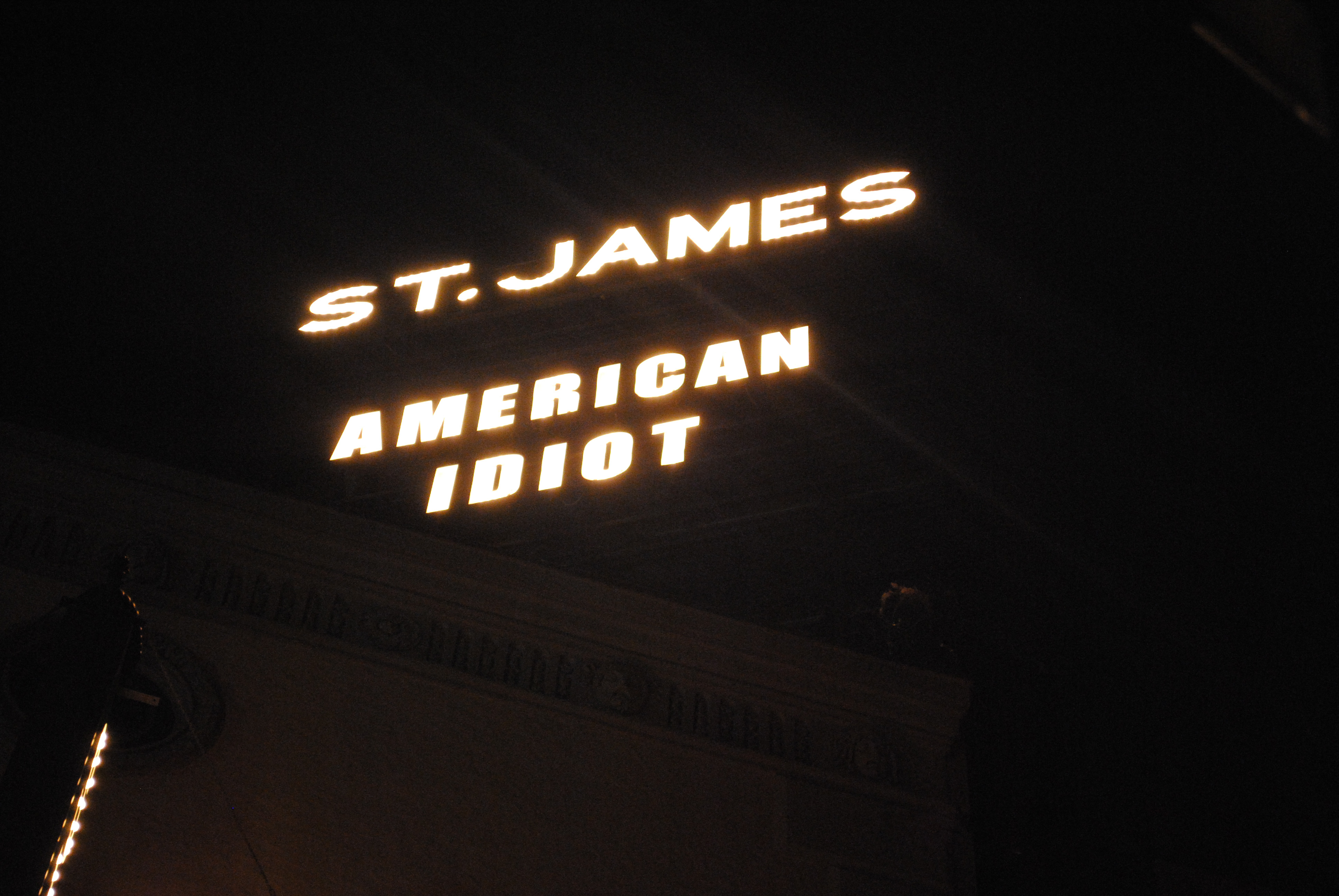
The marquee above the St. James Theatre after the 350th performance of American Idiot

Tom Kitt was the music supervisor and orchestrator for both the Berkeley and Broadway productions. The lead producers for the show were Ira Pittelman and Tom Hulce. Vivek Tiwary was another producer. The creative team for the show was largely the same as for the musical adaptation of Spring Awakening: director Michael Mayer, scenic designer Christine Jones, and lighting designer Kevin Adams. Steven Hoggett was the choreographer, Andrea Lauer was the costume designer, and Brian Ronan was the sound designer.

Green Day's Billie Joe Armstrong played the role of St. Jimmy from September 28 to October 3, 2010. Ticket sales for the week Armstrong performed were up 77%, average ticket prices increased 22%, and gross sales increased 127% from the previous week's totals. The singer-songwriter filled in for Tony Vincent, who took time off for personal matters. Armstrong made another 50 appearances as St. Jimmy between January 1 and February 27, 2011. Melissa Etheridge played the part of St. Jimmy on Broadway from February 1–6, 2011, and Davey Havok took the role from March 1–15, 2011.

Following Armstrong's departure from the cast, the show experienced weak sales. The Broadway production closed on April 24, 2011, after 27 previews and 421 performances. Armstrong returned to the role of St. Jimmy for the final three weeks. The show's cast recording won the 2011 Grammy Award for Best Musical Show Album at the 53rd Annual Grammy Awards.

=== International Tour (2011–2014) ===
American Idiot toured North America beginning on December 28, 2011, in Toronto, Ontario, Canada. The original national tour cast included Van Hughes reprising his role as Johnny, Jake Epstein as Will, Scott J. Campbell as Tunny, Leslie McDonel as Heather, Gabrielle McClinton as Whatsername, Nicci Claspell as The Extraordinary Girl, and Broadway alumnus Joshua Kobak as St. Jimmy. The tour closed on July 8, 2012, at the Orpheum Theatre in San Francisco, California.

A UK and Ireland tour visited Manchester, Southampton, Cardiff, Edinburgh, Glasgow, Dublin, Birmingham, and London later in 2012. The cast included Alex Nee as Johnny, Casey O'Farrell as Will, Thomas Hettrick as Tunny, Kennedy Caughell as Heather, Alyssa DiPalma as Whatsername, Jenna Rubaii as The Extraordinary Girl, and Trent Saunders as St. Jimmy. It started on October 9, 2012, in Southampton and ended on December 16, 2012, at Hammersmith Apollo in London. A second US tour began performances in Norfolk, Virginia on January 25, 2013, with the UK touring cast. It ended in Las Vegas, Nevada on June 16, 2013.

On August 7, 2013, American Idiot made its debut in Tokyo, Japan, and a few weeks later on September 5, it made its South Korean debut in Seoul. Sean Michael Murray took over the role of Johnny, Mariah MacFarlane took over as Heather, and Daniel C. Jackson took over as St. Jimmy.

A non-Equity third US national tour cast included Jared Nepute as Johnny, Casey O'Farrell as Will, Dan Tracy as Tunny, Mariah MacFarlane as Heather, Olivia Puckett as Whatsername, Taylor Jones as Extraordinary Girl, and Daniel C. Jackson as St. Jimmy. On January 16, 2014, Carson Higgins, who had been part of the previous non-Equity/UK tour, took over the role of St. Jimmy after Daniel C. Jackson left the show.

=== Malmö (2015) ===
American Idiot's Scandinavian premiere at the Malmö Opera from February to April 2015 was a new production of the musical. It was the first official production not to be directed by Michael Mayer. The songs were performed in English but the dialogue was spoken in Swedish.

=== West End (2015, 2016) ===
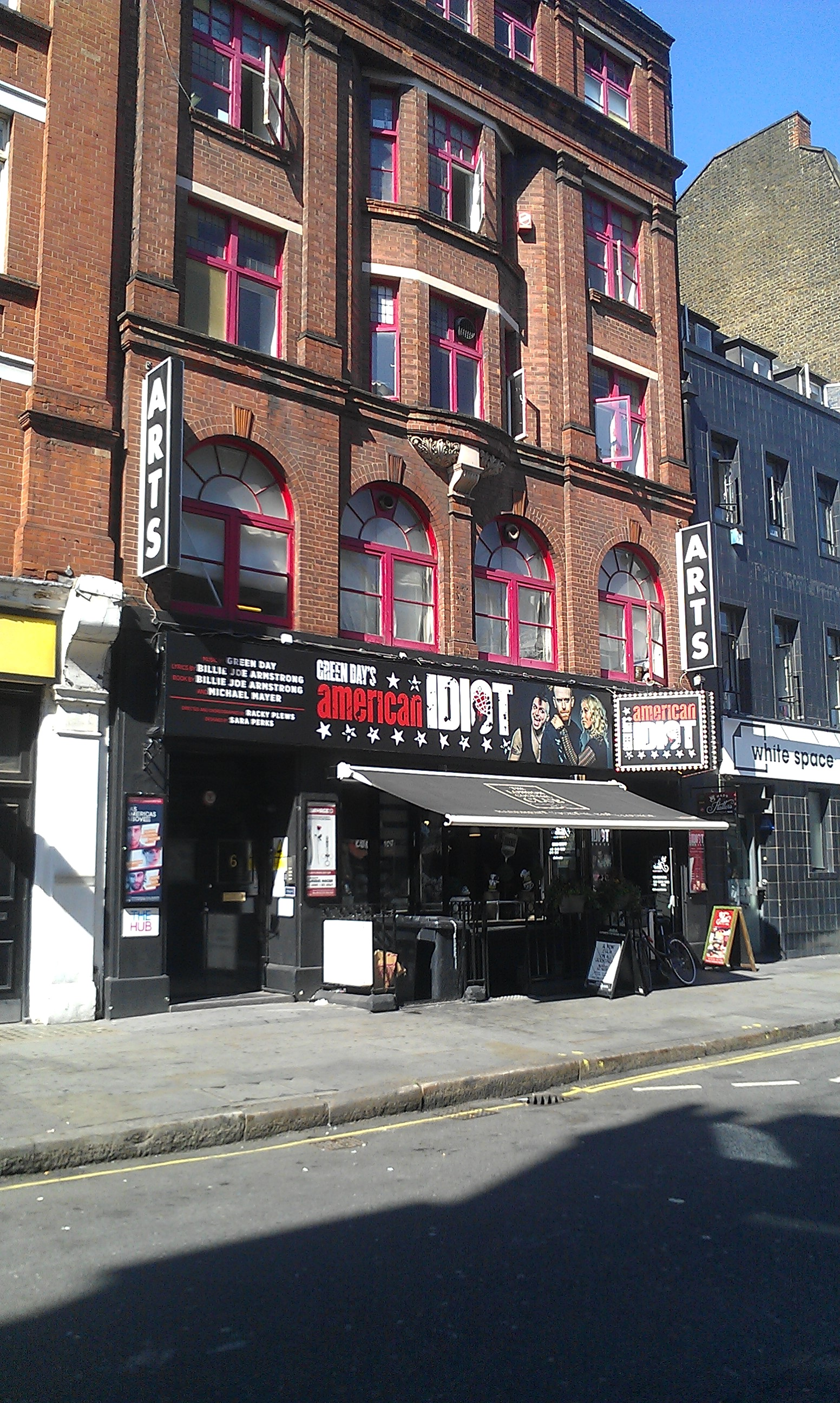
The musical at the Arts Theatre in London

A production opened in 2015 at the Arts Theatre in the West End. The cast included Amelia Lily as Whatsername, Aaron Sidwell as Johnny, Alexis Gerred as Tunny, Steve Rushton as Will and Lucas Rush as St. Jimmy The show was produced by Sell a Door Theatre Company and directed and choreographed by Racky Plews

It was announced in April 2016 that the production would return to the Arts Theatre for the summer of 2016 after a UK tour concluding in Belfast in early July 2016. Matt Thorpe played Johnny in the early stages of the tour until Newton Faulkner became available. In the West End, Newton Faulkner continued to play Johnny. Matt Thorpe made a few further guest appearances as Johnny before taking over the role of Will from Steve Rushton.

=== San Jose (2016) ===
A production was completed in San Jose by City Lights Theatre Company. It ran from July 14 to August 21, but was extended by an extra week.

=== Vancouver (2016) ===
A production by Fighting Chance Productions ran from July 28 to August 27 alongside the theatre company's production of Heathers at Granville Island's Waterfront Theatre. This was the Western Canadian premiere of American Idiot.

=== Brisbane (2017) ===
American Idiot had its Australian debut at the Queensland Performing Arts Centre from February 23 to March 12. The role of St. Jimmy was shared between Australian rock musicians Chris Cheney (The Living End), and Phil Jamieson (Grinspoon).

=== Frankfurt (2018) ===
On January 17, 2018, the first German production of American Idiot opened at the renowned rock concert venue Batschkapp in Frankfurt. The production, mounted by the startup company Off-Musical Frankfurt, was directed by Thomas Helmut Heep. The creative team also consisted of Ludwig Mond (choreographer) and Dean Wilmington (musical director). The lyrics were translated into German by Titus Hoffmann. The production garnered positive reviews, with Jens Alsbach from Musicalzentrale saying that it "sets new standards for musical theatre in Germany".

=== Australian Tour (2018) ===
Following the success of the musical's 2017 run in Brisbane, it returned for a second season in 2018, touring around Australia. Performances took place in Sydney, Adelaide, Perth, and Melbourne before returning to Brisbane and then ending in Darwin. The role of St. Jimmy was shared between Australian rock musicians Phil Jamieson (Grinspoon), Sarah McLeod (The Superjesus) and Adalita Srsen (Magic Dirt).

=== Morristown (2019) ===
From February 8 through February 17, Encore Theatrical Company presented a limited 6 show engagement; the production was hailed by audiences and critics alike and featured aerial sequences staged by Jason Whicker (aerial choreographer from the original Berkeley Rep production) and On the Fly Productions.

=== United Kingdom (2019) ===
The 10th anniversary tour was planned for the United Kingdom. The cast includes Tom Milner as Johnny, Joshua Dowen as Tunny, Samuel Pope as Will, Luke Friend as St. Jimmy, Sam Lavery as Whatsername.

=== Plzeň (2020) ===
The first Czech production of American Idiot premiered on February 15, 2020, at Plzeň's J. K. Tyl Theatre Small Scene. Actors Pavel Klimenda and Lukáš Ondruš were nominated for Thalia Awards 2020 for their performances in roles of Johnny and Tunny respectively.

=== Deaf West (2024) ===
An "ASL-infused revival" by Deaf West Theatre premiered at the Mark Taper Forum in October 2024, the first show in the venue since it announced a pause in operations. It starred Daniel Durant and Mason Alexander Park. Charles McNulty, theatre critic for the Los Angeles Times, said in a largely negative review that while he thought that using American Idiot to reopen the Forum was "perfect timing", the production was "dated" and suffered from several issues regarding staging, casting, and choreography.

== Musical numbers/tracklisting ==
The show features all 13 songs from the album American Idiot, five songs from 21st Century Breakdown, and four from other sources. The show also features an onstage band.

Song	Characters	Source
"American Idiot"	Company	American Idiot
"Jesus of Suburbia"	"Jesus of Suburbia" – Johnny and Will; "City of the Damned" – Tunny, Johnny, Will, & Company; "I Don't Care" – Johnny, Will, Tunny, & Company; "Dearly Beloved" – Heather & Men; "Tales of Another Broken Home" – Johnny, Will, Tunny, Heather, & Company	American Idiot
"Holiday"	Johnny, Tunny, Theo, & Company	American Idiot
"Boulevard of Broken Dreams"	Johnny, Whatsername, Tunny, & Men	American Idiot
"Favorite Son"	Favorite Son & Women	B-side
"Are We the Waiting"	Tunny, Favorite Son, & Company	American Idiot
"St. Jimmy"	Johnny, Declan, Theo, St. Jimmy, & Company	American Idiot
"Give Me Novacaine"	Will, Tunny, & Company	American Idiot
"Last of the American Girls/She's a Rebel"	Johnny, Whatsername, Gerard, Chase, St. Jimmy, & Company	21st Century Breakdown/American Idiot
"Last Night on Earth"	St. Jimmy, Whatsername, Heather, & Company	21st Century Breakdown
"Too Much Too Soon"	Theo, Alysha, Will, & Heather	B-side
"Before the Lobotomy"	Tunny, Joshua, Ben, & Chase	21st Century Breakdown
"Extraordinary Girl"	Extraordinary Girl, Tunny, & Company	American Idiot
"Before the Lobotomy (Reprise)"	Tunny, Joshua, Ben, & Chase	21st Century Breakdown
"When It's Time"	Johnny	previously unreleased
"Know Your Enemy"	St. Jimmy, Will, Johnny, & Company	21st Century Breakdown
"21 Guns"	Whatsername, Extraordinary Girl, Heather, Tunny, Johnny, Will, & Company	21st Century Breakdown
"Letterbomb"	Whatsername & Women	American Idiot
"Wake Me Up When September Ends"	Johnny, Will, Tunny, & Company	American Idiot
"Homecoming"	"The Death of St. Jimmy" – St. Jimmy & Johnny; "East 12th St." – Johnny, Theo, Gerard, & Company; "Nobody Likes You" – Will & Company; "Rock and Roll Girlfriend" – Heather, Will, & Company; "We're Coming Home Again" – Johnny, Tunny, Will, & Company	American Idiot
"Whatsername"	Johnny & Company	American Idiot
"Good Riddance (Time of Your Life)"	Company (Curtain call)	Nimrod

Green Day re-released the single "21 Guns" with the musical cast on Spinner.com on December 3, 2009. This version features Billie Joe Armstrong, together with Christina Sajous, Rebecca Naomi Jones, Mary Faber, and Stark Sands, with back-up from the rest of American Idiot cast. Another version was released with John Gallagher Jr., Michael Esper, and Sands singing the parts that Armstrong had previously sung. Green Day and the cast of the musical also performed the song at the 52nd Annual Grammy Awards on January 31, 2010.

The original cast recording of the musical was released on April 20, 2010. The cast album includes all the songs featured in the musical plus a brand new recording of "When It's Time" by Green Day. The album won Best Musical Theater Album at the 53rd Annual Grammy Awards.

== Critical reception ==
Reviews for the Berkeley Repertory Theatre production were mixed. Charles McNulty of the Los Angeles Times called the show "kinetically entertaining in a way that intentionally reflects the shallow, media-saturated culture the album rails against". Karen D'Souza of San Jose Mercury News called the production "a thrashing collage of songs fused together with hypnotic movement and eye-popping visuals" and thought the show "as compelling as it is abstract [and] channels the grungy spirit of punk while also plucking at the heartstrings." However, Jim Harrington of the Oakland Tribune compared the show unfavorably to the original album, writing: "[what] once was a fine Gouda, has been prepackaged as Velveeta", and continued sarcastically, "In other words, it should do big business on Broadway." Charles Isherwood of The New York Times commented that the show contained "characters who lack much in the way of emotional depth or specificity, and plotlines that are simple to the point of crudity" but also felt that "the show possesses a stimulating energy and a vision of wasted youth that holds us in its grip."

Isherwood's review for the Broadway production was enthusiastic. He called the show "a pulsating portrait of wasted youth that invokes all the standard genre conventions... only to transcend them through the power of its music and the artistry of its execution, the show is as invigorating and ultimately as moving as anything I've seen on Broadway this season. Or maybe for a few seasons past." Jed Gottlieb of the Boston Herald enjoyed the premise of the show but found that "the music and message suffer in a setting where the audience is politely, soberly seated". Michael Kuchwara of the Associated Press found the show to be "visually striking [and] musically adventurous", but noted that "the show has the barest wisp of a story and minimal character development". Paul Kolnik in USA Today enjoyed the contradiction that Green Day's "massively popular, starkly disenchanted album ... would be the feel-good musical of the season". Time magazine's Richard Zoglin opined that the score "is as pure a specimen of contemporary punk rock as Broadway has yet encountered [yet] there's enough variety.... Where the show fall short is as a fully developed narrative." He concluded that "American Idiot, despite its earnest huffing and puffing, remains little more than an annotated rock concert.... Still, [it] deserves at least two cheers – for its irresistible musical energy and for opening fresh vistas for that odd couple, rock and Broadway." Peter Travers from Rolling Stone wrote, "Though American Idiot carries echoes of such rock musicals as Tommy, Hair, Rent and Spring Awakening, it cuts its own path to the heart. You won't know what hit you. American Idiot knows no limits — it's a global knockout."

Reviews of the West End production were generally positive. Rachel Ward of The Telegraph gave it four out of five stars, calling the show "90 minutes of uninterrupted chaos". Kate Stanbury from Official London Theatre summarized, "Chaotic, intense and pulsating with legendary Green Day hits, a trip to this Tony Award-winning musical may just give you the time of your life." Paul Taylor of The Independent also gave four out of five stars, praising director and choreographer Racky Plews for making "a sharp-witted version that throbs with some of the energy of a rock gig (if minus the feeling of unpredictability) while being shrewdly calibrated to suit the intimacy of the 350-seater Arts Theatre."

== Awards and nominations ==
American Idiot won a total of five awards. At a meeting of the Tony Administration Committee on April 30, 2010, the score of American Idiot was deemed ineligible for a Tony Award for Best Original Score nomination because less than 50% of it was written for the stage production.

=== Broadway production ===
Year	Award Ceremony	Category	Nominee	Result	Ref
2010	Drama League Awards	Distinguished Production of a Musical	Billie Joe Armstrong and Michael Mayer (book); Billie Joe Armstrong (lyrics); Green Day (music)	Nominated	
2010	Drama League Awards	Distinguished Performance	John Gallagher Jr.	Nominated	
2010	Drama League Awards	Distinguished Performance	Tony Vincent	Nominated	
2010	Outer Critics Circle Awards	Outstanding New Broadway Musical		Nominated	
2010	Outer Critics Circle Awards	Outstanding Lighting Design (Play or Musical)	Kevin Adams	Won	
2010	Drama Desk Awards	Outstanding Musical		Nominated	
2010	Drama Desk Awards	Outstanding Director of a Musical	Michael Mayer	Won	
2010	Drama Desk Awards	Outstanding Orchestrations	Tom Kitt	Nominated	
2010	Tony Awards	Best Musical		Nominated	
2010	Tony Awards	Best Scenic Design of a Musical	Christine Jones	Won	
2010	Tony Awards	Best Lighting Design of a Musical	Kevin Adams	Won	
2011	Grammy Awards	Best Musical Show Album	Billie Joe Armstrong (producer); Chris Dugan & Chris Lord-Alge (engineers/mixers)	Won	

=== Brisbane production ===
Year	Award Ceremony	Category	Nominee	Result	Ref
2017	Helpmann Awards	Best Female Actor in a Supporting Role in a Musical	Phoebe Panaretos	Nominated	
2017	Helpmann Awards	Best Lighting Design	Matt Marshall	Nominated	

== Broadway attendances, performances, and gross receipts ==
The following is a month-by-month breakdown of sales, attendance, and performance data for the production at the 1,709-capacity St. James Theatre.

Time period	Attendance	Gross sales	Average Paid Admission	Percent of Capacity	References
March 24 – April 4, 2010 (12 previews)	16,879	$1,312,033	$77.73	82.3%	
April 5 – May 2, 2010 (14 previews, 16 performances)	38,195	$2,591,496	$67.85	74.5%	
May 3 – June 6, 2010 (40 performances)	47,371	$3,898,058	$82.29	69.3%	
June 7 – July 4, 2010 (31 performances)	36,876	$3,082,501	$83.59	69.6%	
July 5 – August 1, 2010 (32 performances)	39,793	$3,199,187	$80.40	72.8%	
August 2 – September 5, 2010 (40 performances)	45,125	$3,535,540	$78.35	66.0%	
September 6 – October 3, 2010 (31 performances)	36,363	$2,491,234	$68.51	68.6%	
October 4 – 31, 2010 (32 performances)	28,202	$1,983,404	$70.33	51.6%	
November 1 – December 5, 2010 (40 performances)	33,334	$2,452,032	$73.56	48.8%	
December 6, 2010 – January 2, 2011 (32 performances)	33,694	$2,694,839	$79.98	61.6%	
January 3 – February 6, 2011 (40 performances)	47,347	$3,912,616	$82.64	69.3%	
February 7 – March 6, 2011 (32 performances)	43,148	$3,818,799	$88.50	78.9%	
March 7 – April 3, 2011 (32 performances)	32,498	$1,912,847	$58.86	59.4%	
April 4–24, 2011 (24 performances)	31,898	$2,913,465	$91.34	77.8%	
Totals
422 performances, 26 previews	510,723	$39,798,051	$77.92	66.7%	

== Documentary ==
On January 23, 2012, it was announced that a documentary showing Armstrong's journey from punk rock to Broadway was to be released. Called Broadway Idiot and showing a lot of behind-the-scenes of the musical production, the movie was directed by Doug Hamilton, veteran television journalist for CBS News' 60 Minutes and PBS documentaries such as Nova, Frontline and American Masters. A trailer was released on January 30, 2013. The documentary premiered at the South by Southwest Film Festival on March 15, 2013. On October 11, 2013, it was released in some theaters and on video on demand by FilmBuff.

Film review aggregator Rotten Tomatoes reports that 64% of critics gave the film a positive review based on 22 reviews, with an average score of 5.8/10. On Metacritic, which assigns a normalised rating out of 100 based on reviews from critics, the film has a score of 51 (citing "mixed or average reviews") based on 14 reviews.

== Cancelled film adaptation ==
In April 2011, production company Playtone optioned the musical to develop a film version, and Universal Pictures began initial negotiations to distribute it. Michael Mayer, who directed the Broadway production, was named as director. Dustin Lance Black was initially hired to adapt the musical. Billie Joe Armstrong was asked to star as St. Jimmy, and the film was proposed for a 2013 release. Armstrong later posted on his Twitter account that he had not "totally committed" to the role but was interested in it.

In July 2013, at a screening of Broadway Idiot, Mayer reported that the film adaptation was still happening, but production had not been scheduled due to "Hollywood bullshit". In March 2014, playwright Rolin Jones told the Hartford Courant that he was writing a new screenplay for the film. Comparing it to the musical, Jones said, "The idea is to get it a little dirtier and a little nastier and translate it into visual terms. There's not going to be a lot of dialogue and it probably should be a little shorter, too. After that, it just takes its 'movie time' in getting done". He expected to finish the script by the end of the month.

In October 2016, in an interview with NME, Armstrong revealed that the film was now being made at HBO and the script was getting rewrites. He confirmed he would reprise his Broadway role as St. Jimmy. In November 2016, Armstrong stated that the film was "going to be a lot different from the musical. It's kind of, more surreal but I think there's going to be parts of it that might offend people – which is good. I think it's a good time to offend people. I think there's just going to be a lot of imagery that we couldn't pull off in the musical in the stage version. You know, I don't want to give away too much, but it will be shocking in a way which makes you think."

In February 2020, Billie Joe Armstrong revealed to NME that plans for a film adaptation of the stage musical had been "pretty much scrapped", without providing any more details as to the reason.
