= American Idiot: The Original Broadway Cast Recording =

Cast recording by Cast of American Idiot and Green Day
- Released: April 20, 2010
- Recorded: November 2009 – January 2010
- Studio: Electric Lady Studios (New York City)
- Genres: Punk rock; alternative rock; pop punk; musical
- Length: 82:10
- Label: Reprise
- Producer: Green Day

Green Day chronology
Last Night on Earth: Live in Tokyo (2009)	American Idiot: The Original Broadway Cast Recording (2010)	Awesome as Fuck (2011)

Singles from American Idiot: The Original Broadway Cast Recording
- 1. "21 Guns" Released: December 3, 2009; 2. "When It's Time" Released: June 11, 2010

American Idiot: The Original Broadway Cast Recording is an album by the cast of American Idiot and Green Day. In September 2009, American Idiot began its run in the Berkeley Repertory Theatre, California. After two extensions, it was transferred to the St. James Theatre on Broadway. The first single from the album, "21 Guns", was released on December 3, 2009. The album also includes "When It's Time", a previously unreleased song written by Billie Joe Armstrong. Two versions of it appear on the album, one by the cast and one by Green Day. It was originally released on mtv.com on April 13, 2010, and was released on CD on April 20, 2010. A vinyl version of the album was released on July 13, 2010. The album debuted at number 43 on the Billboard 200, becoming one of the highest-charting musical soundtracks. The album won Best Musical Show Album at the 53rd Annual Grammy Awards. Shortly after the album's release, another album featuring 13 songs from the album was released as American Idiot: Selections from the Original Broadway Cast Recording. The recording features performances by the Broadway cast alongside members of Green Day. The album documents the musical's adaptation of songs from Green Day's 2004 studio album American Idiot.

== Track listing ==
All lyrics are written by Billie Joe Armstrong, except where noted; all music is composed by Billie Joe Armstrong, Mike Dirnt and Tré Cool, arranged by Tom Kitt.

No.	Title	Performed by	Length
1.	"American Idiot"	Cast of American Idiot	3:05
2.	"Jesus of Suburbia"; I. "Jesus of Suburbia"; II. "City of the Damned"; III. "I Don't Care"; IV. "Dearly Beloved"; V. "Tales of Another Broken Home"	John Gallagher Jr., Michael Esper, Stark Sands, Mary Faber & Company	9:07
3.	"Holiday"	John Gallagher Jr., Stark Sands, Theo Stockman & Company	4:07
4.	"Boulevard of Broken Dreams"	John Gallagher Jr., Rebecca Naomi Jones, Stark Sands & Company	4:22
5.	"Favorite Son"	Joshua Henry, Mary Faber & Company	2:40
6.	"Are We the Waiting"	Stark Sands, Joshua Henry & Company	2:53
7.	"St. Jimmy"	John Gallagher Jr., Declan Bennett, Theo Stockman, Tony Vincent & Company	2:46
8.	"Give Me Novacaine"	Michael Esper, Stark Sands & Company	3:33
9.	"Last of the American Girls/She's a Rebel"	John Gallagher Jr., Gerard Canonico, Rebecca Naomi Jones, Tony Vincent & Company	2:22
10.	"Last Night on Earth"	Tony Vincent, Rebecca Naomi Jones, Mary Faber & Company	4:16
11.	"Too Much Too Soon"	Theo Stockman, Michael Esper, Mary Faber & Alysha Umphress	2:40
12.	"Before the Lobotomy"	Stark Sands, Chase Peacock, Joshua Henry & Ben Thompson	1:40
13.	"Extraordinary Girl"	Christina Sajous, Stark Sands & Company	3:27
14.	"Before the Lobotomy (Reprise)"	Stark Sands, Chase Peacock, Joshua Henry & Ben Thompson	1:14
15.	"When It's Time"	John Gallagher Jr.	2:40
16.	"Know Your Enemy"	Tony Vincent, Michael Esper, John Gallagher Jr. & Company	2:07
17.	"21 Guns (Green Day, David Bowie)"	Rebecca Naomi Jones, John Gallagher Jr. & Company	4:45
18.	"Letterbomb"	Rebecca Naomi Jones, Mary Faber, Christina Sajous & Company	3:24
19.	"Wake Me Up When September Ends"	John Gallagher Jr., Michael Esper, Stark Sands & Company	4:46
20.	"Homecoming"; I. "The Death of St. Jimmy"; II. "East 12th St."; III. "Nobody Likes You" (Dirnt); IV. "Rock and Roll Girlfriend" (Cool); V. "We're Coming Home Again"	Tony Vincent, John Gallagher Jr., Theo Stockman & Company	9:39
21.	"Whatsername"	John Gallagher Jr.	4:05
22.	"When It's Time" (Green Day version)	Green Day	3:23

Tracks are split into two discs, although there is no mention of this on the sleeve as tracks are written consecutively as tracks 1 to 22. Despite being the curtain call of the show, "Good Riddance (Time of Your Life)" is not featured on the album.

=== American Idiot: Selections from the Original Broadway Cast Recording ===
1. "American Idiot" – 3:05
2. "Holiday" – 4:07
3. "Boulevard of Broken Dreams" – 4:22
4. "St. Jimmy" – 2:46
5. "Give Me Novacaine" – 3:33
6. "Last of the American Girls/She's a Rebel" – 2:22
7. "Last Night on Earth" – 4:16
8. "21 Guns" – 4:45
9. "Letterbomb" – 3:24
10. "Wake Me Up When September Ends" – 4:46
11. "Homecoming"
  I. "The Death of St. Jimmy"
  II. "East 12th St."
  III. "Nobody Likes You"
  IV. "Rock and Roll Girlfriend"
  V. "We're Coming Home Again" – 9:39
12. "Whatsername" – 4:05
13. "When It's Time" (Green Day version) – 3:23

== Reception ==
Professional ratings
Review scores
Source	Rating
Allmusic	4/5 stars

As did the Original American Idiot album, it was generally well received.

== Personnel ==
=== Musicians ===
Band

- Billie Joe Armstrong – vocals, guitar, piano
- Mike Dirnt – bass
- Tré Cool – drums, percussion
- Tom Kitt – arrangements, orchestration
- Carmel Dean – piano, synthesizer, accordion
- Kathy Marshall – violin
- Erin Benim – viola
- Rachel Turner Houk – cello
- Trey Files – percussion
- Alec Berlin; John Gallagher Jr.; Michael Esper; Stark Sands; Joshua Henry; Gerard Canonico – guitar

=== Musical cast ===
Main parts

- John Gallagher Jr. (Johnny)
- Michael Esper (Will)
- Stark Sands (Tunny)
- Tony Vincent (St. Jimmy/Jimmy)
- Rebecca Naomi Jones (Whatsername)
- Mary Faber (Heather)
- Christina Sajous (The Extraordinary Girl)
- Joshua Henry (Favorite Son)
- Theo Stockman (The Representative of Jingletown/ "Too Much Too Soon" Male Soloist)
- Alysha Umphress ("Too Much Too Soon" Female Soloist)

Ensemble

- Declan Bennett
- Andrew Call
- Gerard Canonico
- Miguel Cervantes
- Van Hughes
- Brian Charles Johnson
- Joshua Kobak
- Lorin Latarro
- Omar Lopez-Cepero
- Leslie McDonel
- Chase Peacock
- Ben Thompson
- Alysha Umphress
- Aspen Vincent
- Libby Winters

=== Crew ===
Production

- Billie Joe Armstrong – producer
- Michael Mayer – director
- Chris Lord-Alge – mixing engineer
- Adam Fair – additional engineering
- Chris Dugan – engineer
- Brad Kobylczak – additional engineering
- Ian Shea; Lee Bothwick; Denny Muller – assistant engineers
- Ted Jensen – mastering

Artwork

- Chris Bilheimer – art design
- Doug Hamilton; Kevin Berne – photography

== Chart positions ==
Chart (2010)	Peak Position
Billboard 200	43
Billboard Top Cast Albums	1
Austria Albums Top 75	15
Greece Albums Chart	32
Italian FIMI top 100	48
Swedish Albums Chart	46
German Albums Chart	70

== See also ==
- American Idiot (musical)
