= Song of the Century =

Song of the Century may refer to:

- Song of the Century (Green Day song)
- Songs of the Century, a list
