= Olivia Puckett =

American actress (born 1991)

- Born: 1991 (age 34–35)
- Education: Wagner College
- Occupation: Actress

Olivia Puckett (born 1991) is an American actress.

== Life and career ==
Puckett grew up in San Diego and began singing when she was young. She graduated from Wagner College in New York in 2013. She was cast out of college as Whatsername in a touring production of American Idiot. In July 2018, she replaced Laura Dreyfuss in the role of Zoe Murphy in the Broadway production of Dear Evan Hansen. She has played the dual roles of Peggy Schuyler and Maria Reynolds in a touring production of Hamilton.
