= Last of the American Girls =

Single by Green Day

from the album 21st Century Breakdown
- Released: March 22, 2010
- Recorded: 2008
- Genre: Pop-punk
- Length: 3:51
- Label: Reprise
- Composer: Green Day
- Lyricist: Billie Joe Armstrong
- Producers: Butch Vig; Green Day

Green Day singles chronology
| "21st Century Breakdown" (2009) | "Last of the American Girls" (2010) | "When It's Time" (2010) |

Music video
- "Last of the American Girls" on YouTube

Audio sample
- file; help

"Last of the American Girls" is a song by American rock band Green Day. The song is the tenth track from their eighth studio album 21st Century Breakdown (2009) Written by the band and produced by Butch Vig, the song was released as the album's fifth and final single on March 22, 2010.

A music video for the track was released on April 1, 2010. The song peaked at number 26 on the US Alternative Airplay chart.

== Background and composition ==
The band premiered "Last of the American Girls" during a secret show at the Fox Oakland Theatre on April 14, 2009, alongside other songs which would appear on 21st Century Breakdown.

"Last of the American Girls" is a pop-punk song in the key of B major, described as being reminiscent of songs from Dookie (1994) and American Idiot (2004). The song is considered by critics to be similar to the college rock-style of Tom Petty and the Heartbreakers, especially to their song "American Girl". The song also contains harmonies reminiscent of the Beach Boys. According to Armstrong, "Last of the American Girls" was initially inspired by his wife, before he incorporated his own beliefs into the lyrics. Lyrically, the song describes a female rebel who is paranoid and partakes in conspiracy theories. The song advances the story of 21st Century Breakdown through expanding on the idealistic and politically driven personality of the character Gloria.

== Music video ==
The set for the music video, which consists of furniture strewn in a desert, was compared to an "apartment without walls"

The music video for "Last of the American Girls" was directed by Marc Webb, who also directed other music videos from 21st Century Breakdown. It stars Lisa Stelly reprising her role as Gloria from the music video for "21 Guns". The video shows a bored Gloria in a desert landscape strewn with furniture performing mundane activities like watching television and washing dishes while being followed by a pair of dancing blond twins. Towards the end, Gloria causes a shooting target to burst and a car to explode by "firing" a finger gun. Shots of the band performing the song in the desert are interspersed throughout the video.

The music video has been commended for its theatrical nature, with Daniel Kreps of Rolling Stone comparing the video to that of "Telephone".

== Critical reception ==
"Last of the American Girls" received mostly positive reception from critics. Rob Sheffield of Rolling Stone wrote that the song "comes on as a fabulous left-wing love song to a rebel girl", while Chad Childers of Loudwire commented that the song was "among the album's better deeper cuts".

== Legacy ==
"Last of the American Girls" appears in American Idiot, a jukebox musical based on songs by Green Day, combined with the song "She's a Rebel". It is one of the few songs in the musical to originate from 21st Century Breakdown, as opposed to being from the album American Idiot itself.

The song was released as downloadable content for the Rock Band series.

== Credits and personnel ==
- Songwriting: Billie Joe Armstrong, Mike Dirnt, and Tré Cool
- Production: Butch Vig and Green Day

== Track listing ==
Promo CD single
| No. | Title | Length |
|---|---|---|
| 1. | "Last of the American Girls" | 3:51 |

CD maxi
| No. | Title | Length |
|---|---|---|
| 1. | "Last of the American Girls" | 3:53 |
| 2. | "Know Your Enemy" (Live at the Fox Theatre, Oakland, California on April 14, 2009) | 4:49 |
| 3. | "21st Century Breakdown" (Studio 880 Sessions) | 5:06 |
| Total length: | | 13:08 |

Digital download
| No. | Title | Length |
|---|---|---|
| 1. | "Last of the American Girls" | 3:51 |

== Chart performance ==
| Chart (2010) | Peak position |
|---|---|
| Austria (Ö3 Austria Top 40) | 29 |
| Germany (GfK) | 45 |
| Hungary (Mahasz) | 16 |
| Netherlands (Dutch Top 40 Tipparade) | 4 |
| U.S. Billboard Rock Songs | 34 |
| U.S. Billboard Alternative Songs | 26 |
