= East Jesus Nowhere =

Single by Green Day

from the album 21st Century Breakdown
- Released: October 19, 2009
- Recorded: 2008
- Genre: Punk rock
- Length: 4:35
- Label: Reprise
- Composer: Green Day
- Lyricist: Billie Joe Armstrong
- Producers: Butch Vig; Green Day

Green Day singles chronology
"21 Guns" (2009)	"East Jesus Nowhere" (2009)	"21st Century Breakdown" (2009)

Music video
- "East Jesus Nowhere" on YouTube

"East Jesus Nowhere" is a song by American rock band Green Day. The single was released on October 19, 2009, as the third single and eighth track from their eighth album 21st Century Breakdown.

== Song meaning ==
The song critiques fundamentalist religion and was written by singer/guitarist Billie Joe Armstrong after bassist Mike Dirnt attended a church service where a friend's baby was baptized. The title is derived from a phrase used in the 2007 film Juno, in which the character uses it to refer to a particularly remote location.

== Music video ==
The music video, released on September 17, 2009, features a montage of live concert footage and images from their 21st Century Breakdown World Tour. The video was directed by Chris Dugan and M. Douglas Silverstein.

== Chart performance ==
Chart (2009)	Peak position
Canada Hot 100 (Billboard)	71
UK Rock & Metal (OCC)	10
US Alternative Airplay (Billboard)	17
US Hot Rock & Alternative Songs (Billboard)	24
US Mainstream Rock (Billboard)	35

== Personnel ==
- Billie Joe Armstrong – lead vocals, guitar
- Mike Dirnt – bass guitar, backing vocals
- Tré Cool – drums, percussion
