= 21st Century Breakdown (song) =

Single by Green Day

from the album 21st Century Breakdown
- Released: December 21, 2009
- Recorded: 2008–2009 at Ocean Way Recording, Hollywood, California; Studio 880, Oakland, California; Jel Studios, Newport Beach, California; Costa Mesa Studios, Costa Mesa, California
- Genre: Arena rock; hard rock
- Length: 5:09 (album); 4:41 (radio/video)
- Label: Reprise
- Composer: Green Day
- Lyricist: Billie Joe Armstrong
- Producers: Butch Vig; Green Day

Green Day singles chronology
"East Jesus Nowhere" (2009)	"21st Century Breakdown" (2009)	"Last of the American Girls" (2010)

Music video
- "21st Century Breakdown" on YouTube

"21st Century Breakdown" is a song by American rock band Green Day from their album of the same name. Billie Joe Armstrong composed the song, which is mainly based on his personal life and musical influences. The song was released as the fourth single from the album on December 21, 2009.

== Background and composition ==
Much of the song was written about the personal life of its writer, Armstrong. According to David Fricke of Rolling Stone, its opening lyrics "Born into Nixon, I was raised in hell" refer to Armstrong's birth year of 1972, while "We are the class of the class of '13" references his eldest son Joseph's high school graduation year of 2013. Later in the song, lyrics begin to reference the song's musical influences: "Last one born / but first one to run" is an allusion to Bruce Springsteen's Born to Run, while "I never made it as a working class hero" is a reference to the John Lennon song "Working Class Hero", which the band had previously released a cover of.

Spin suggested that the song's guitar usage is similar to that of The Edge.

== Release and reception ==
On September 10, 2009, Green Day's official site announced that the song would be the band's next single. However, on September 25, Green Day instead said that "East Jesus Nowhere" would be released next and offered a release date of October 19. On October 21, the band again asserted that "21st Century Breakdown" would be released as a single and gave a release date of December 21.

Reception to the song has been mainly positive. Spin thought that it was "Green Day's most epic song yet". AbsolutePunk stated that the song "bursts forth with resilient aplomb". Adam Downer of Sputnikmusic called the track "heavily indebted to The Who [and] Queen".

== Music video ==
The music video for "21st Century Breakdown" was directed by Marc Webb. It premiered on-air and online October 19, 2009, on MTV and a number of its subsidiary websites. It starts off with a wall with the spray-painted woman and man from the album art of 21st Century Breakdown. After they kiss, the first chord strikes. The video is animated in graffiti until the final thirty seconds, when the graffiti version of Armstrong transitions into the real Armstrong and the video concludes in live action.

== Track listing ==
All lyrics are written by Billie Joe Armstrong; all music is composed by Green Day.

No.	Title	Length
1.	"21st Century Breakdown"	5:09
2.	"Last of the American Girls" (live at Studio 880, Oakland, California)	3:54
Total length:		9:03

== Charts ==
Chart (2009)	Peak position
France (SNEP)	41
Germany (GfK)	71
Japan Hot 100 (Billboard)	17

== Personnel ==
- Billie Joe Armstrong – lead vocals, guitar, piano
- Mike Dirnt – bass guitar, backing vocals
- Tré Cool – drums, percussion
