= American Idiot (song) =

2004 single by Green Day

Single by Green Day

from the album American Idiot
- B-side: "Too Much Too Soon"
- Released: August 6, 2004
- Genre: Punk rock; pop-punk
- Length: 2:54
- Label: Reprise
- Composer: Green Day
- Lyricist: Billie Joe Armstrong
- Producers: Rob Cavallo; Green Day

Green Day singles chronology
"Waiting" (2001)	"American Idiot" (2004)	"Boulevard of Broken Dreams" (2004)

Music video
- "American Idiot" on YouTube

"American Idiot" is a protest song by the American rock band Green Day. The first single released from the album American Idiot, the song received positive reviews by critics and was nominated for four 2005 Grammy Awards: Record of the Year, Best Rock Performance by a Duo or Group with Vocal, Best Rock Song, and Best Music Video.

== Background ==
One of the two explicitly political songs on the album (the other being fellow single "Holiday"), "American Idiot" says that mass media has orchestrated paranoia and idiocy among the public. Citing cable news coverage of the Iraq War, Billie Joe Armstrong recalled, "They had all these Geraldo-like journalists in the tanks with the soldiers, getting the play-by-play." He felt with that, American news crossed the line from journalism to reality television, showcasing violent footage intercut with advertisements. Armstrong went on to write the song after hearing the Lynyrd Skynyrd song "That's How I Like It" on his car radio. "It was like, 'I'm proud to be a redneck' and I was like, 'oh my God, why would you be proud of something like that?' This is exactly what I'm against." Songwriter Mike Dirnt felt many people would be insulted by the track until they realized that, rather than it being a finger-pointing song of anger, it could be viewed as a "call for individuality". The song emphasizes strong language, juxtaposing the words "faggot" and "America", to create what he imagined would be a voice for the disenfranchised.

In a 2004 interview with Q Magazine, the three members of Green Day discussed the idea of flag desecration in relation to their song, with Armstrong and Dirnt being the most supportive: "It means nothing to me. Let's burn the fucking thing."

== Composition ==
"American Idiot"
A 15-second sample of "American Idiot"

"American Idiot" is written in the key of A♭ major. It is composed of four chords, the I-IV-♭VII-IV-I-♭VII progression, while the chorus and solo share the IV-I-V-I progression. The song is classified as a punk rock and pop-punk song. The musical style has been cited as a mix of the melodic punk of Social Distortion and the hard rock of Joan Jett. Armstrong plays a 1956 Les Paul Junior on the song, switching to a reissued 1959 flame-top Les Paul for the double-tracked guitar solo. Armstrong was initially reluctant to pursue recording a solo, fearing it to be corny. He eventually decided to record the solo, as he hoped for the album to be "about being 15 and rocking out in front of a mirror." The song's format and cadence was influenced by the Midnight Oil song "US Forces", which Armstrong was introduced to through his wife.

== Release ==
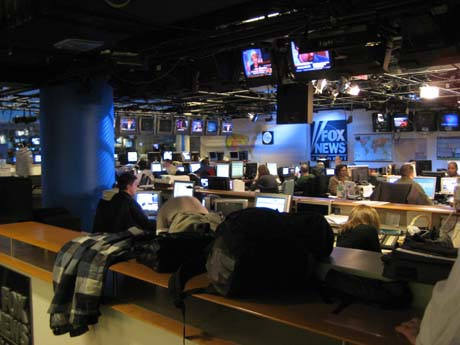
Billie Joe Armstrong touches on the idea that mainstream media has caused paranoia among the American public in a post-9/11 world. Armstrong also suggests that these same media outlets are brainwashing their viewers through propaganda and subliminal messaging.

Released in 2004, the single peaked at number 61 on the Billboard Hot 100, becoming Green Day's first Billboard Hot 100 chart entry. The appearance of "American Idiot" on the US singles charts occurred just prior to Billboard's inclusion of Internet download purchases into their Billboard Hot 100 chart data, which would have made a significant difference in the song's peak had it benefited from the new chart tabulation system. "American Idiot" became Green Day's first top-five single in the United Kingdom, peaking at number 3, and it debuted at number 1 in Canada, their only #1 single there. In Australia, the song reached number 7 was ranked number 22 on Triple J's Hottest 100 of 2004. Green Day performed the song at the 2005 Grammy Awards. "American Idiot" has sold 1,371,000 copies as of July 2010.

Ian Winwood of Kerrang! said that "Green Day did for their generation, and their country, what the Sex Pistols did for the United Kingdom in 1977, for a nation sick with love for a parasitical royal family."

=== Live version ===
Green Day's 2011 live album Awesome as Fuck contained a live rendition of the song, featuring an extended guitar solo, recorded in Montreal, Quebec, Canada, on the 21st Century Breakdown World Tour. It was also featured in their 2005 live album Bullet in a Bible, set at Milton Keynes Bowl.

== Music video ==
The music video for "American Idiot" shows the band playing in a warehouse against a green American flag (a reference to the name of the band), which only has 48 stars. In the middle of the video, the band is seen playing at different speeds (fast, slow-motion, and normal speed). During the bridge, the stripes of the flag melt onto the floor. The band is then sprayed by a green liquid from amplifiers next to the flag. At the end, the band drop their instruments and leave. The song's video was directed by Samuel Bayer. At MTV's Video Music Awards, the video won the Viewer's Choice Award and was also nominated for Best Art Direction.

== Accolades ==
"American Idiot" was ranked the number 47 Single of the Decade by Rolling Stone magazine in 2009. VH1 also placed the song at number 13 on its Top 100 Songs of the 2000s in 2011. Rolling Stone ranked it number 432 of The 500 Greatest Songs of All Time in 2010, the only Green Day song on the list. The song is certified Gold in the United Kingdom for sales of 400,000.

== Use as a protest song ==
In advance of Donald Trump's visit to the UK in July 2018, a campaign to get "American Idiot" to the top of the UK song charts was launched. On the Official UK Charts dated July 13, 2018, the song re-entered the UK Singles Chart at 25 and the UK Singles Downloads Chart at number 2.

Amid Trump's presidential run in 2016, Billie Joe Armstrong began changing the lyric "the subliminal, mind-fuck America" to "the subliminal mind-Trump America" during live performances of "American Idiot", and in 2019, he added another change, shifting "I'm not a part of a redneck agenda" to "I'm not a part of a MAGA agenda". Armstrong has been strongly critical of Donald Trump, comparing him to Adolf Hitler. The lyrical variation received renewed popular attention following Green Day's televised performance at New Year's Rockin' Eve 2024. They also performed this same lyrical variation at Coachella 2025. The band modified the same lyrics to "I'm not part of an Elon agenda" at a concert in South Africa.

== Track listings ==
Europe single (CD 1)
No.	Title	Length
1.	"American Idiot"	2:54
2.	"Too Much Too Soon"	3:33

Europe single (CD 2)
No.	Title	Length
1.	"American Idiot"	2:54
2.	"Shoplifter"	1:52
3.	"Governator" (lyrics written by Mike Dirnt)	2:31

7-inch picture disc

Side A
No.	Title	Length
1.	"American Idiot"	2:54

Side B
No.	Title	Length
1.	"Too Much Too Soon"	3:33

DVD Single
No.	Title	Length
1.	"American Idiot" (music video)	3:02
2.	"American Idiot" (live at the Grammy Awards in 2005)	3:17

== Personnel ==
Personnel are adapted from the American Idiot single liner notes.

- Billie Joe Armstrong – lead vocals, guitar; backing vocals on "Governator"
- Mike Dirnt – bass, backing vocals; lead vocals on "Governator"
- Tré Cool – drums

Production

- Rob Cavallo; Green Day – producers
- Chris Dugan; Doug McKean – engineer
- Brian "Dr. Vibb" Vibberts; Greg "Stimie" Burns; Jimmy Hoyson; Joe Brown; Dmitar "Dim-e" Krnjaic; Reto Peter – assistant engineers
- Chris Lord-Alge – mixing
- Ted Jensen – mastering
- Chris Bilheimer – cover art

== Charts ==
=== Weekly charts ===
2004–2005 weekly chart performance for "American Idiot"
Chart (2004–2005)	Peak position
Australia (ARIA)	7
Austria (Ö3 Austria Top 40)	18
Canada (Nielsen SoundScan)	1
Canada Rock Top 30 (Radio & Records)	5
Croatia (HRT)	4
Czech Republic (IFPI)	38
Europe (Eurochart Hot 100)	10
Germany (GfK)	28
Ireland (IRMA)	12
Italy (FIMI)	13
Netherlands (Dutch Tipparade 40)	4
Netherlands (Single Top 100)	37
New Zealand (Recorded Music NZ)	7
Scottish Singles Sales (Official Charts)	3
Sweden (Sverigetopplistan)	18
Switzerland (Schweizer Hitparade)	75
UK Singles (Official Charts)	3
UK Rock & Metal (Official Charts)	1
US Billboard Hot 100	61
US Alternative Airplay (Billboard)	1
US Mainstream Rock Airplay (Billboard)	5

2018 weekly chart performance for "American Idiot"
Chart (2018)	Peak position
Scottish Singles Sales (Official Charts)	2
UK Singles (Official Charts)	25
UK Rock & Metal (Official Charts)	1
US Hot Rock & Alternative Songs (Billboard)	23

2026 weekly chart performance for "American Idiot"
Chart (2026)	Peak position
US Hot Rock & Alternative Songs (Billboard)	17

=== Year-end charts ===
2004 year-end chart performance for "American Idiot"
Chart (2004)	Position
Australia (ARIA)	57
UK Singles (OCC)	95
US Mainstream Rock Tracks (Billboard)	40
US Modern Rock Tracks (Billboard)	24

2005 year-end chart performance for "American Idiot"
Chart (2005)	Position
US Modern Rock Tracks (Billboard)	67

== Certifications ==
Certifications and sales for "American Idiot"
Region	Certification	Certified units/sales
Australia (ARIA)	Gold	35,000^{^}
Canada (Music Canada)	5× Platinum	400,000^{‡}
Denmark (IFPI Danmark)	Platinum	90,000^{‡}
Germany (BVMI)	Platinum	600,000^{‡}
Italy (FIMI)	Platinum	50,000^{‡}
Japan (RIAJ)	Gold	100,000^{*}
New Zealand (RMNZ)	3× Platinum	90,000^{‡}
Spain (Promusicae)	Platinum	60,000^{‡}
United Kingdom (BPI)	3× Platinum	1,800,000^{‡}
United States (RIAA)	Gold	500,000^{*}
^{*} Sales figures based on certification alone.^{^} Shipments figures based on certification alone.^{‡} Sales+streaming figures based on certification alone.

== Release history ==
Release dates and formats for "American Idiot"
Region	Date	Format(s)	Label(s)	Ref.
United States	August 6, 2004	Active rock; alternative radio	Reprise	
United States	August 6, 2004	Digital download	Reprise	
Germany	August 6, 2004	Digital download	Reprise	
United Kingdom	August 6, 2004	Digital download	Reprise	
United Kingdom	September 13, 2004	CD	Reprise	

== 5 Seconds of Summer version ==
"American Idiot"

Song by 5 Seconds of Summer
- A-side: "Amnesia"
- Released: June 11, 2014
- Length: 3:57
- Label: Capitol; Hi or Hey
- Songwriter: Billie Joe Armstrong
- Producer: John Feldmann

Australian pop rock band 5 Seconds of Summer covered the song and released it on June 11, 2014. The song was released as part of Kerrang!'s tribute album to American Idiot, marking the record's 10-year anniversary. It was also included as a B-side on the Amnesia single. The band performed the track live on The Howard Stern Show.

=== Critical reception ===
The cover was met with mostly positive reviews from music critics. Haley Blum of USA Today called the track "pretty good". She stated, "The guys, who play their own instruments [...] produce a pretty faithful rendition of the track." Fuse.tv remarked, "The cover is fairly faithful, but it does have 5SOS flair." Michelle McGahan of PopCrush praised the band's harmonies on the track. Carolyn Menyes of Music Times gave a less positive review, criticizing the band's use of autotune and vocal distortion that "make this song sound not quite as biting as the Green Day version" and the track's overproduction.

=== Charts ===
Weekly chart performance for "American Idiot"
Chart (2014)	Peak position
Australia (ARIA)	89

== See also ==
- List of anti-war songs
