= 21st Century Breakdown =

Studio album by Green Day
- Released: May 15, 2009
- Recorded: January 2008 – April 2009
- Studios: Ocean Way Recording, Hollywood; Studio 880, Oakland, California; Jel Studios, Newport Beach, California; Costa Mesa Studios, Costa Mesa, California
- Genres: Punk rock; pop-punk; arena rock; power pop; alternative rock
- Length: 69:17
- Labels: Reprise; Warner Bros.
- Producers: Butch Vig; Green Day

Green Day chronology
Bullet in a Bible (2005)	21st Century Breakdown (2009)	Last Night on Earth: Live in Tokyo (2009)

Green Day studio chronology
American Idiot (2004)	21st Century Breakdown (2009)	¡Uno! (2012)

Singles from 21st Century Breakdown
- 1. "Know Your Enemy" Released: April 16, 2009; 2. "21 Guns" Released: May 25, 2009; 3. "East Jesus Nowhere" Released: October 19, 2009; 4. "21st Century Breakdown" Released: December 21, 2009; 5. "Last of the American Girls" Released: March 22, 2010

21st Century Breakdown is the eighth studio album by the American rock band Green Day, released on May 15, 2009, through Reprise Records. Green Day commenced work on the record in January 2006 and forty-five songs were written by vocalist and guitarist Billie Joe Armstrong by October 2007, but the band members did not enter studio work until January 2008.

21st Century Breakdown is a concept album and rock opera, much like their previous album American Idiot (2004). According to the band, the album is a rumination of "the era in which we live as we question and try to make sense of the selfish manipulation going on around us". The singles "Know Your Enemy" and "21 Guns" exemplify the themes of alienation and politically motivated anger present in the record.

To handle the record, they turned to producer Butch Vig, best known for producing Nirvana's Nevermind (1991). Critical response to 21st Century Breakdown was positive, though it was generally seen as inferior to American Idiot upon release. The record achieved Green Day's best chart performance to date, reaching number one on the album charts of various countries, including the United States Billboard 200, the European Top 100 Albums, and the United Kingdom Albums Chart. The album won the Grammy Award for Best Rock Album at the 52nd Grammy Awards on January 31, 2010. As of December 2010, 21st Century Breakdown has sold 1,050,000 copies in the United States and more than 4 million worldwide. At a runtime of 69 minutes and 16 seconds, it is Green Day’s longest studio album to date.

As the band's first album since 2004's American Idiot, the five-year hiatus marked the longest gap between studio albums in the band's history.

== Writing and recording ==
Green Day began to write new songs for what would become 21st Century Breakdown in January 2006 after touring extensively in 2005 in support of their seventh studio album American Idiot. At the time, frontman Billie Joe Armstrong stated: "We'll start with silence, and that's how we'll be able to find the inspiration to find another record." The band did not release any details of the writing and recording process until October 2007, when Armstrong said in an interview with Rolling Stone that he had written "something like 45 songs". The band members worked on the primitive conceptual stages of the album at their rehearsal studio in Oakland, California. Little was revealed on the themes or musical style of the album, but Armstrong stated: "I want to dig into who I am and what I'm feeling at this moment – which is middle-aged." He added that many of the 45 songs were written on piano instead of guitar.

Green Day began the recording process for 21st Century Breakdown in January 2008. Later that year, it was confirmed that the band worked with producer Butch Vig. The album was recorded with Vig throughout 2008 and into early 2009 at four locations in California: Ocean Way Recording in Hollywood, Studio 880 in Oakland, Jel Studios in Newport Beach, and Costa Mesa Studios in Costa Mesa. While recording in Hollywood, the band members bought cheap turntables from Amoeba Music and listened to many vinyl records for inspiration, including albums by the Beat and the Plimsouls. Armstrong cited as inspiration the music of the Kinks' Ray Davies, the Pretty Things' S.F. Sorrow, the Doors' The Doors and Strange Days, and Meat Loaf's Bat Out of Hell. Drummer Tré Cool noted the influence of Eddie Cochran and the Creation on Armstrong's writing. David Bowie is credited as a songwriter on the song "21 Guns" to avoid a potential plagiarism lawsuit, as the melody of the chorus is similar to the Bowie-penned "All the Young Dudes".

While writing at his home studio, Armstrong worked on a cover of the Who's 1966 mini-opera "A Quick One, While He's Away"; Green Day recorded a full-band version of the song during the album sessions. Vig noted that frustrations would sometimes cause delays in the recording process for 21st Century Breakdown. Armstrong kept his lyrics closely guarded and intentionally mixed his demos so that the vocals were low in the mix and thus unintelligible to the other band members. It was not until late 2008 that he chose to share his words with Cool, Vig, and bassist Mike Dirnt by sitting down with them and reading the entire album's lyrics aloud in order. The band members made the finishing touches on the album in early April 2009 and claimed that its release would lead to a "kind of... post-partum depression".

== Themes and composition ==
I look at Christian and Gloria, and it's me. Gloria is one side: this person trying to hold on to this sense of belief, still trying to do good. Whereas Christian is deep into his own demons and victimizing himself over that.

— Billie Joe Armstrong, on the link between the two main protagonists of 21st Century Breakdown and himself

21st Century Breakdown continues the rock opera style of its predecessor, American Idiot. The album is set in Detroit, Michigan and is divided into three acts: "Heroes and Cons", "Charlatans and Saints", and "Horseshoes and Handgrenades". Its loose narrative follows a young couple named Christian and Gloria through the challenges present in the U.S. following the presidency of George W. Bush. Bassist Mike Dirnt has compared the relationships between the songs to those in Bruce Springsteen's Born to Run, saying that the themes are not as tightly interwoven as in a concept album, but that they are still connected. Many of the record's themes and lyrics are drawn from Armstrong's personal life and he sings in the first-person narrative style about abandonment and vengeance in "Before the Lobotomy", "Christian's Inferno", and "Peacemaker". Rolling Stone noted that the album is "the most personal, emotionally convulsive record Armstrong has ever written".

The title track's opening lyric "Born into Nixon, I was raised in hell" references Armstrong's birth year of 1972, while "We are the class of '13" references the fact that his eldest son, Joseph, would graduate from high school in 2013. Dirnt has expressed his belief that "Last of the American Girls" was written about Armstrong's wife Adrienne, who he claimed is steadfast in her beliefs and assertively defends them, as is the topic of the girl in the record. Armstrong has cited his "disconnected" childhood—he was raised by his five older siblings after their father's death, while their mother worked graveyard shifts as a waitress—as the roots of the discontent expressed on 21st Century Breakdown. "East Jesus Nowhere" rebukes fundamentalist religion and was written after Armstrong attended a church service where a friend's baby was baptized.

Musically, 21st Century Breakdown is similar to the punk rock style of American Idiot, but many critics have claimed that Green Day's traditional sound has evolved in the five years, with 21st Century Breakdown incorporating new influences such as heavier, louder pop rock and arena rock on an epic scale. Rob Sheffield of Rolling Stone indicated that the album provides ballads that are Green Day's most polished; he claimed that the band "combine punk-thrash with their newfound love of classic-rock grandiosity". MTV compared the material to that of classic rockers like the Who, while Spin called the title track "Green Day's most epic song yet". Cool has remarked: "It's important to us that we're still looked at as a punk band. It was our religion, our higher education". However, he also noted that Armstrong had delved into the past in writing 21st Century Breakdown, gleaning inspiration from the artists who shaped rock music. Armstrong himself has stated: "Ground zero for me is still punk rock. I like painting an ugly picture. I get something uplifting out of singing some of the most horrifying shit you can sing about. It's just my DNA."

With a running time of almost 70 minutes, 21st Century Breakdown is Green Day's longest album to date.

Critics have labeled 21st Century Breakdown as pop-punk, punk rock, power pop, arena rock, post-punk, alternative rock, and pop rock. Additionally, Loudwire stated that the album represented scene music.

== Promotion and release ==
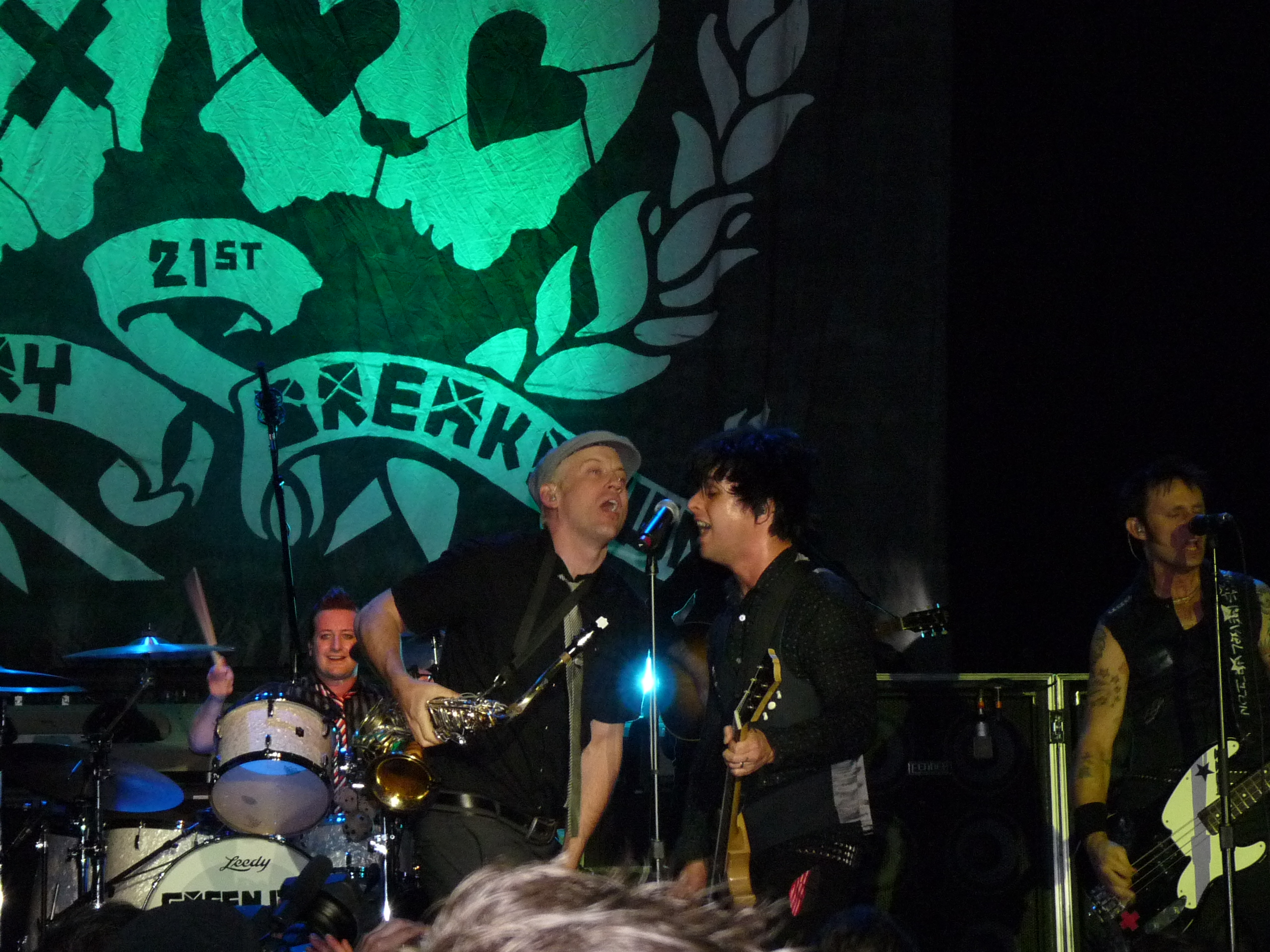
Green Day performing in a 21st Century Breakdown showcase concert at the Kesselhaus, Berlin, May 7, 2009

Green Day commenced work on the record in January 2006. The writing and recording process spanned three years and four California recording studios, and it was finished in April 2009. On February 9, 2009, Green Day announced the album title and that the record would be split into three acts: "Heroes and Cons", "Charlatans and Saints", and "Horseshoes and Handgrenades". On March 17, a teaser trailer for 21st Century Breakdown was posted on the band's website. The international release date of May 15 was announced on March 25. In early April 2009, Green Day premiered "Know Your Enemy" on television; a portion of the song was used as introductory music to the 2009 NCAA men's basketball tournament championship game. The band first performed 21st Century Breakdown in full during a string of California club shows in April 2009. At each show, concertgoers were given programs containing all of the album's lyrics. The first single, "Know Your Enemy", was released on April 16, 2009, and soon after the world premiere of the song's music video occurred on April 24 on the MTV UK website.

21st Century Breakdown was released internationally on May 15, 2009, through Reprise Records. The special edition vinyl version was limited to 3,000 copies and consisted of three 10" records, one for each of the album's "acts", a CD copy of the album, a 60-page art booklet, and a code for the digital download of the full album. The album artwork process was led by Chris Bilheimer and is based on a work from artist Sixten, who confirmed that the couple on the cover were "just friends of a friend at a party in Eskilstuna, Sweden" and explained that a mutual friend snapped a picture of the pair kissing. He added: "I love their passion, and just had to make a stencil out of it to spread the love." The cover art was noted for a marked similarity with that of Blur's 2003 album Think Tank, itself a stencil by artist Banksy, except that one had the couple wearing diving helmets. Green Day showcased a collection of similarly themed art, called "The Art of Rock", at an art exhibition in London between October 23 and November 1, 2009. The "kissing couple" on the cover later was re-created in the music video for "21 Guns".

The record debuted at number one on the Billboard 200 in the U.S., where it sold 215,000 copies in its first week, which was a shortened three days. In its second week, 21st Century Breakdown moved an additional 166,000 copies, sliding to number 2. In its third week, it sold 76,000 copies. 21st Century Breakdown slid down to number five in its fourth week but achieved the coveted Gold status for sales of 500,000 copies in the same week. The album remained at number one on the Billboard Top Rock Albums chart for three weeks. In the United Kingdom, the album debuted at No. 1, selling 79,770 copies in its first week and it has sold over 600,000 copies to date. In Canada, the album debuted at No. 1 on the Canadian Albums Chart, selling 30,000 copies in its first week. The album debuted at the top of sales charts in twenty four total countries, including a peak of number one on the European Top 100 Albums. 21st Century Breakdown was only released in a Parental Advisory version containing explicit lyrics and content; Walmart refuses to sell albums with a Parental Advisory sticker and requested that Green Day release a censored edition. The band members responded by stating: "There's nothing dirty about our record... They want artists to censor their records in order to be carried in there. We just said no. We've never done it before. You feel like you're in 1953 or something." The second single, "21 Guns", was released to radio stations on May 25. The band embarked on a world tour in July 2009; the North American leg lasted through September and the European leg ended in November. "East Jesus Nowhere" was released as the album's third single on October 19, 2009.

== Reception and legacy ==
Professional ratings
Aggregate scores
Source	Rating
AnyDecentMusic?	5.4/10
Metacritic	70/100
Review scores
Source	Rating
AllMusic	3.5/5 stars
The A.V. Club	B+
Entertainment Weekly	B
The Guardian	3/5 stars
Los Angeles Times	3.5/4 stars
MSN Music (Consumer Guide)	C
NME	4/5 stars
Pitchfork	4.8/10
Rolling Stone	4.5/5 stars
Spin	3/5 stars

Reception to 21st Century Breakdown has been generally favorable, according to aggregating website Metacritic, which reported a rating of 70/100 based on 30 critical reviews. Dan Silver of The Observer awarded the record four stars out of five and likened it to both Bruce Springsteen's music and the avant-garde writing of Chuck Palahniuk. Rolling Stone's David Fricke called 21st Century Breakdown "a compound bomb of classic-rock ecstasy, no-mercy punk assault and pop-song wiles; it's like the Clash's London Calling, The Who's Quadrophenia and Hüsker Dü's Zen Arcade all compressed into 18 songs". Dan Cairns of The Times concluded: "Lyrically, it may succeed in capturing the contradictions, vulnerabilities and longing for harmony that thrum through Armstrong, Dirnt and Cool, their country, and humanity as a whole. But its real triumph, in an age of trimming, of market testing, of self-censorship and lowest common denominators, is not simply to aim insanely high, but to make it to the summit."

Criticism centered on the concept of the record; BBC's Chris Jones said that it is "griping vaguely against 'authority'" and that "too many buzz words obscure incisive meaning". Steve Kandell of Spin wrote that the humor of American Idiot was "sorely missed" and that the energy of the album seemed "directionless". The Guardian's Alexis Petridis indicated that "the storyline becomes impossible to follow". Robert Christgau of MSN Music panned the album, reserving particular distaste for the multiple songs that heavily utilize dynamics, before concluding, "I don't like right-wing Christianists either. But as every oppressed teen in the right-wing orbit knows full well, they're not as garbled and simplistic as Armstrong's anthems insist." Adam Downer of Sputnikmusic was even less receptive, calling the album "more conceptually vague/ridiculous than American Idiot", and going on to say that it "spirals out of control in its own heroic glory and never regains focus, thus ending with a product that Green Day couldn't afford to produce: an average record". Slant Magazine claims that "an uncanny sense of familiarity hangs over too much of the album. The melodies of several tracks suggest ghosts of older Green Day songs." Kyle Ryan at The A.V. Club gave the album a B+, noting it as "going [even] bolder" than American Idiot. Ryan also declared "21st Century Breakdown reinforces what American Idiot first revealed: Green Day should never be underestimated."

In 2023, Paul Brannigan of Louder included the album on his list of "10 terrible punk albums with one classic song", stating the opinion that the lead single was the album's only good track. He wrote: "Green Day aimed to make another Big Statement, but choked on their own ambition, delivering an over-long three act collection sagging with overblown, relentlessly mediocre material."

=== Accolades ===
Publication	Country	Accolade	Year	Rank
Rolling Stone	United States	Best Albums of 2009	2009	5
Kerrang!	United Kingdom	Reader's Choice: Best 50 Albums of the 21st Century	2009	17
Rhapsody	United States	The 25 Best Albums of 2009	2009	16

=== Album awards ===
Year	Ceremony	Award	Result
2009	Grammy Awards	Best Rock Album	Won
2009	Teen Choice Awards	Music Album Group	Nominated
2009	TMF Awards	Best International Album	Nominated
2009	Kerrang! Awards	Best Album	Nominated
2010	MTV Video Music Awards Japan	Album of the Year	Nominated
2010	NME Awards	Best Album	Nominated
2010	NME Awards	Worst Album	Nominated

== Track listing ==
All lyrics are written by Billie Joe Armstrong; all music is composed by Green Day (Billie Joe Armstrong, Mike Dirnt, Tré Cool); "21 Guns" credits David Bowie as additional songwriter.

Act I: Heroes and Cons
No.	Title	Length
1.	"Song of the Century"	0:57
2.	"21st Century Breakdown"	5:09
3.	"Know Your Enemy"	3:11
4.	"¡Viva la Gloria!"	3:31
5.	"Before the Lobotomy"	4:37
6.	"Christian's Inferno"	3:07
7.	"Last Night on Earth"	3:56

Act II: Charlatans and Saints
No.	Title	Length
8.	"East Jesus Nowhere"	4:35
9.	"Peacemaker"	3:24
10.	"Last of the American Girls"	3:51
11.	"Murder City"	2:54
12.	"¿Viva la Gloria? (Little Girl)"	3:48
13.	"Restless Heart Syndrome"	4:21

Act III: Horseshoes and Handgrenades
No.	Title	Length
14.	"Horseshoes and Handgrenades"	3:14
15.	"The Static Age"	4:16
16.	"21 Guns"	5:21
17.	"American Eulogy" (A. "Mass Hysteria" / B. "Modern World")	4:26
18.	"See the Light"	4:35
Total length:		69:17

All lyrics are written by Billie Joe Armstrong; all music is composed by Green Day, except where noted.

Amazon.com MP3 version bonus tracks
No.	Title	Length
19.	"Burnout" (Live in St. Petersburg, FL at Jannus Landing on March 11, 1994)	2:21
Total length:		71:34

iTunes deluxe edition bonus tracks
No.	Title	Writer(s)	Length
19.	"A Quick One, While He's Away" (originally performed by the Who)	Pete Townshend	7:59
20.	"Another State of Mind" (originally performed by Social Distortion)	Mike Ness	2:46
Total length:			79:18

iTunes pre-order edition bonus tracks
No.	Title	Writer(s)	Length
21.	"That's All Right" (originally performed by Elvis Presley)	Arthur Crudup	2:01
22.	"Like a Rolling Stone" (originally performed by Bob Dylan)	Bob Dylan	6:10
Total length:			87:29

Japanese edition bonus track
No.	Title	Length
19.	"Lights Out"	2:16
Total length:		71:25

Rhapsody version bonus tracks
No.	Title	Length
19.	"Know Your Enemy" (live)	4:47
20.	"The Static Age" (live)	4:30
Total length:		77:90

Target version bonus CD (Live in Japan)
No.	Title	Length
1.	"American Idiot" (live)	4:18
2.	"Jesus of Suburbia" (live)	9:22
3.	"Holiday" (live)	4:34
4.	"Are We the Waiting" (live)	2:49
5.	"St. Jimmy" (live)	2:58
6.	"Boulevard of Broken Dreams" (live)	4:41
Total length:		29:08

Japanese bonus DVD
No.	Title	Length
1.	"Know Your Enemy" (live at Abbey Road)	3:08
2.	"East Jesus Nowhere" (live at Abbey Road)	4:17
3.	"St. Jimmy" (live at Abbey Road)	2:53
4.	"21 Guns" (live at Abbey Road)	5:32
5.	"American Idiot" (live at Abbey Road)	3:48
6.	"Know Your Enemy" (music video)	3:13
7.	"21 Guns" (music video)	5:25
8.	"21st Century Breakdown" (music video)	4:49

== Personnel ==
Credits taken from 21st Century Breakdown liner notes.

Green Day

- Billie Joe Armstrong – lead vocals, guitar, piano
- Mike Dirnt – bass, backing vocals; lead vocals on "Modern World" (section in "American Eulogy")
- Tré Cool – drums, percussion

Additional musicians

- Jason Freese – piano
- Tom Kitt – string arrangements
- Patrick Warren – string conducting

Production

- Butch Vig – producer
- Chris Lord-Alge – mix engineer
- Chris Dugan – engineer
- Keith Armstrong – assistant engineer
- Nik Karpen – assistant engineer
- Wesley Seidman – assistant engineer
- Brad Kobylczak – additional engineering
- Joe McGrath – additional engineering
- Andrew Schubert – additional engineering
- Brad Townshend – additional engineering
- Ted Jensen – mastering

Artwork

- Chris Bilheimer – design, photography, stencils
- Andrew Black – stencils
- Micah Chong – stencils
- David Cooper – stencils
- Marina Chavez – back cover photo

== Release history ==
Region	Date	Label	Format	Catalog
World	May 15, 2009	Warner Music	Digital download	—
United States	May 15, 2009	Reprise	CD, double LP	517153
United Kingdom	May 15, 2009	Warner Music	CD	9362-49802-1
Europe	May 15, 2009	Warner Music	CD	9362-49802-1
Australia	May 15, 2009	Warner Music	CD	9362498021
Australia	May 15, 2009	Warner Music	Deluxe CD	9362497777
Australia	May 29, 2009	Warner Music	LP	9362497853
Japan	May 15, 2009	Warner Music Japan	CD	WPCR-13377
Japan	January 20, 2010	Warner Music Japan	CD+DVD (Japan Tour Edition)	WPZR-30361
Japan	July 11, 2012	Warner Music Japan	CD (Japan Edition)	WPCR-75691
Japan	September 26, 2012	Warner Music Japan	SHM-CD	WPCR-14540

== Charts ==
=== Weekly charts ===
Weekly chart performance for 21st Century Breakdown
Chart (2009–10)	Peak position
Australian Albums (ARIA)	2
Austrian Albums (Ö3 Austria)	1
Belgian Albums (Ultratop Flanders)	1
Belgian Albums (Ultratop Wallonia)	3
Canadian Albums (Billboard)	1
Czech Albums (ČNS IFPI)	1
Danish Albums (Hitlisten)	1
Dutch Albums (Album Top 100)	4
European Top 100 Albums (Billboard)	1
Finnish Albums (Suomen virallinen lista)	3
French Albums (SNEP)	1
German Albums (Offizielle Top 100)	1
Hungarian Albums (MAHASZ)	4
Irish Albums (IRMA)	2
Italian Albums (FIMI)	1
Japan Hot Albums (Billboard Japan)	1
Japanese Albums (Oricon)	1
Mexican Albums (Top 100 Mexico)	3
New Zealand Albums (RMNZ)	1
Norwegian Albums (VG-lista)	1
Polish Albums (ZPAV)	6
Portuguese Albums (AFP)	2
Slovenian Albums (IFPI)	2
South African Albums (RISA)	8
Spanish Albums (Promusicae)	1
Swedish Albums (Sverigetopplistan)	1
Swiss Albums (Schweizer Hitparade)	1
UK Albums (Official Charts)	1
UK Rock & Metal Albums (Official Charts)	1
US Billboard 200	1
US Top Alternative Albums (Billboard)	1
US Top Rock Albums (Billboard)	1
US Indie Store Album Sales (Billboard)	1

=== Year-end charts ===
2009 year-end chart performance for 21st Century Breakdown
Chart (2009)	Position
Australian Albums (ARIA)	19
Austrian Albums (Ö3 Austria)	8
Belgian Albums (Ultratop Flanders)	41
Belgian Alternative Albums (Ultratop Flanders)	20
Belgian Albums (Ultratop Wallonia)	53
Canadian Albums (Billboard)	19
Danish Albums (Hitlisten)	46
Dutch Albums (Album Top 100)	66
European Top 100 Albums (Billboard)	11
Finnish Albums (Suomen virallinen lista)	7
French Albums (SNEP)	33
German Albums (Offizielle Top 100)	9
Italian Albums (FIMI)	26
Japanese Albums (Oricon)	34
Mexican Albums (Top 100 Mexico)	63
New Zealand Albums (RMNZ)	13
Swedish Albums (Sverigetopplistan)	20
Swedish Albums & Compilations (Sverigetopplistan)	25
Swiss Albums (Schweizer Hitparade)	4
UK Albums (OCC)	35
US Alternative Albums (Billboard)	6
US Billboard 200	25
US Top Rock Albums (Billboard)	7

2010 year-end chart performance for 21st Century Breakdown
Chart (2010)	Position
Austrian Albums (Ö3 Austria)	30
French Albums (SNEP)	166

== Certifications ==
Certifications and sales for 21st Century Breakdown
Region	Certification	Certified units/sales
Argentina (CAPIF)	Gold	20,000^{^}
Australia (ARIA)	Platinum	70,000^{^}
Austria (IFPI Austria)	Platinum	20,000^{*}
Belgium (BRMA)	Gold	15,000^{*}
Brazil (Pro-Música Brasil)	Gold	30,000^{*}
Canada (Music Canada)	2× Platinum	160,000^{^}
Denmark (IFPI Danmark)	Platinum	30,000^{^}
Finland (Musiikkituottajat)	Gold	16,386
France (SNEP)	Platinum	100,000^{*}
GCC (IFPI Middle East)	Platinum	6,000^{*}
Germany (BVMI)	3× Gold	300,000^{^}
Ireland (IRMA)	Platinum	15,000^{^}
Italy (FIMI)	Platinum	70,000^{*}
Japan (RIAJ)	Gold	100,000^{^}
New Zealand (RMNZ)	2× Platinum	30,000^{‡}
Norway (IFPI Norway)	Gold	15,000^{*}
Sweden (GLF)	Gold	20,000^{^}
Switzerland (IFPI Switzerland)	Platinum	30,000^{^}
United Kingdom (BPI)	Platinum	300,000^{^}
United States (RIAA)	Platinum	1,050,000
Summaries
Europe (IFPI)	Platinum	1,000,000^{*}
^{*} Sales figures based on certification alone.^{^} Shipments figures based on certification alone.^{‡} Sales+streaming figures based on certification alone.

== Notes ==
- Fricke, David (May 28, 2009). "Green Day Fights On". Rolling Stone. pp. 48–50.
