= 21 Guns (song) =

2009 single by Green Day

Single by Green Day

from the album 21st Century Breakdown
- B-side: "Favorite Son"
- Released: May 26, 2009 (radio/digital download); July 14, 2009 (CD single)
- Genre: Arena rock; pop-punk; power pop
- Length: 5:21
- Label: Reprise
- Composers: Green Day; David Bowie
- Lyricist: Billie Joe Armstrong
- Producers: Butch Vig; Green Day

Green Day singles chronology
| "Know Your Enemy" (2009) | "21 Guns" (2009) | "East Jesus Nowhere" (2009) |

Music video
- "21 Guns" on YouTube

"21 Guns" is a song by American rock band Green Day. It was released as the second single from their eighth studio album, 21st Century Breakdown (2009), and serves as the sixteenth track from the album. The single was released through Reprise Records on May 26, 2009, on radio and digital download and July 14, 2009, as a CD single.

The song has been a commercial success on the Billboard Hot 100 chart, peaking at No. 22, becoming their highest-charting single since "Wake Me Up When September Ends" in 2005. To date, it is their last top 40 hit in the United States. The song is also featured on the soundtrack of the film Transformers: Revenge of the Fallen, being one of the songs played during the end credits of the film.

It was nominated for a Grammy for Best Rock Performance by a Duo or Group with Vocal and Best Rock Song in 2010.

== Background and composition ==
"21 Guns"
A 30-second sample of "21 Guns"

"21 Guns" addresses the topic of patriotism. Frontman and chief songwriter Billie Joe Armstrong told Q, in May 2009: "It brings up 21st Century Breakdown in a lot of ways, and the 21-gun salute for someone that's fallen, but done in an arena rock 'n' roll sort of way."

According to Q, the song is "a mammoth power ballad with a chorus like Mott the Hoople's 'All the Young Dudes'". William Goodman from Spin agreed, also comparing the song to "All the Young Dudes". Entertainment Weekly's Simon Vozick-Levinson described it as a "sensitive arena rock cut that made us think of Toto's 'Africa'. While the chorus sounded more like ELO's 'Telephone Line.' A Rolling Stone article commented that it "has a dash of 'Boulevard of Broken Dreams' to it". Spin's Goodman agreed, writing: "This track covers a lot of territory in its five minutes, from a solo acoustic guitar (reminiscent of 'Boulevard of Broken Dreams') to Brian May-worthy electric riffage. But the chorus holds the killer hook, [because] Armstrong hits highs with his voice in a thrilling moment."

The song has been labeled by critics as arena rock, pop-punk, and power pop. David Bowie is credited as a songwriter on the song to avoid a potential plagiarism lawsuit, as the melody of the chorus is similar to the Bowie-penned "All the Young Dudes".

== Critical reception ==
The song has received critical acclaim. Chris Fallon writing for AbsolutePunk commented that "it is arguably the album's highlight, presenting an anti-war ballad that is both monumentally enduring and also sophisticated protest." James Montgomery of MTV News described it as "a cell-phones-in-the-air anthem, starting with more sharply strummed acoustic guitars". Colin Moriarty from IGN wrote that the track is "perhaps the best song on the album as a whole, a multi-faceted song with a pretty poignant message to boot".

Jordan Richardson of Blogcritics commented: "It's the album’s anti-war hymn, reaching heroic heights with a sleek sort of sappiness that fits flawlessly. The range and sentiment may dishearten those looking for a little more Dookie from their Green Day, but I’ve never heard Billie Joe sound so good and so earnest as he pulls his frail voice upwards to knock out some stunning high notes." Mayer Nissim gave the song three out of five stars, writing: "It combines verses reminiscent of Neil Young's 'Heart of Gold' with big power-pop chord changes and choruses that soar in all the right places. The jerky charm of the band's earlier work may be missing, but there's still lots to enjoy here."

== Chart performance ==
The song debuted at No. 55 on the Billboard Hot 100, peaking at No. 22 (becoming their highest-peaking song since the 2005 hit "Wake Me Up When September Ends", and their second-to-last single to debut on the chart, as after 'Oh Love', all of their subsequent tracks have failed to chart), and No. 81 on the Canadian Hot 100, reaching No. 15. It reached No. 3 on the Alternative Songs chart and No. 17 on the Hot Mainstream Rock Tracks chart. It also reached No. 7 on the Billboard Pop Songs chart. On the Australian ARIA Singles Chart, the song peaked at No. 14. On the UK Singles Chart, it debuted at No. 100 and rose to No. 36, and as of 2021, remains their last UK Top 40 hit. In New Zealand, the song debuted at No. 23 and peaked at No. 3 in its seventh week on the chart, giving it the highest peak of any Green Day song there. In New Zealand, it was certified Platinum after 13 weeks on the chart, selling over 15,000 copies. It was certified Platinum by the RIAA. The single was also certified Platinum in Italy.

== Release and media appearance ==
"21 Guns" was released to modern punk radio stations on May 25, 2009, although it had already been played on some radio stations, such as KROQ in Los Angeles and 101.9 in New York City. In the radio edit, the song is over forty seconds shorter than the album version due to the bridge being shortened and the intro being taken out. The CD single and clear 7" single were released on July 14, 2009.

The song is featured heavily in Transformers: Revenge of the Fallen and appears on the soundtrack, which was released on June 12, 2009. It was released as downloadable content for the music video game series Rock Band on July 7, 2009, along with the songs "East Jesus Nowhere" and "Know Your Enemy".

The song was featured in episode 6 of The Vampire Diaries.

A live version was also released on 21 Guns Live EP in September 2009.

== Music video ==
A music video was directed by Marc Webb and filmed in Los Angeles on June 6, 2009. It premiered on MySpace on Monday, June 22, 2009, at midnight EDT. A shorter version of the video also exists, which is set to the radio edit of the song.

It is the third Green Day video to feature touring guitarist Jason White performing with the band, following "Wake Me Up When September Ends" and "Working Class Hero". He is also seen briefly in the music videos for "When I Come Around" and "Jesus of Suburbia", but is not performing with the band.

After spending the previous week at number 3, the video peaked at number one on VH1 Top 20 Countdown on August 22, 2009, and again on September 19, 2009. It also won Best Rock Video (Green Day), Best Direction (Marc Webb) and Best Cinematography (Jonathan Sela) for the 2009 MTV Video Music Awards.

The video takes place with the band and the album's two protagonists Christian (Josh Boswell) and Gloria (Lisa Stelly) taking refuge in a white room after robbing a bank. The police arrive outside the room and open fire through the window, to the couple's terror. As bullets rain through the room, the band continues playing. Gloria picks up the phone and throws it into a fish tank. As the bullets continue to fly and tear apart the room, Christian and Gloria become calm and walk toward each other, unharmed by the bullets. They embrace and kiss as the room goes dark, recreating the 21st Century Breakdown cover art. As the song ends, the room lights up again, and they are still uninjured. After the room lights up, there are various shots of destruction in the room, including a shot of some of the writing on the walls. The writing includes an excerpt of the lyrics to "21 Guns", as well as those of the song "See the Light" which is the final song on the album. The video may represent the meaning of the song in the story.

== Musical cast version ==
"21 Guns"

Single by Green Day and the cast of American Idiot

from the album American Idiot: The Original Broadway Cast Recording
- B-side: "Like a Rolling Stone"
- Released: December 3, 2009
- Recorded: 2009
- Genre: Alternative rock
- Length: 4:41
- Label: Reprise
- Songwriters: Green Day, David Bowie
- Producer: Green Day

Green Day and the cast of American Idiot singles chronology
| "21 Guns" (2009) | "When It's Time" (2010) |

Green Day has recorded two versions of "21 Guns" with the cast of American Idiot. The recording was produced by Billie Joe Armstrong. The recording with Armstrong singing the male solo parts was released on December 3, 2009, to Spinner.com and also released for digital download on December 22, 2009. The video was released February 1, 2010.

The second version of the song with the cast of American Idiot features Stark Sands, John Gallagher Jr., and Michael Esper singing their respective solos instead of Armstrong.

It was performed with Armstrong singing lead male vocals at the 52nd Grammy Awards.

== Live EP ==
21 Guns Live EP

EP by Green Day
- Released: September 4, 2009
- Recorded: July 25, 2009, Albany, New York; and July 28, 2009 Madison Square Garden, New York City
- Genres: Pop punk; punk rock; alternative rock
- Length: 17:52
- Label: Reprise
- Producer: Green Day

Green Day released a live EP for the song including live performances of "Welcome to Paradise", "Brain Stew/Jaded" and "F.O.D." recorded live in Albany, New York and Madison Square Garden. This EP was released on the Australian iTunes store, Amazon UK, and Napster.

== Track listing ==
- Original version:

Digital download/Maxi CD
| No. | Title | Length |
|---|---|---|
| 1. | "21 Guns" | 5:21 |
| 2. | "Favorite Son" (Green Day's contribution to the Rock Against Bush Vol. 2 compilation) | 2:13 |
| 3. | "21 Guns" (Studio 880 version) | 5:17 |

CD single/7" single
| No. | Title | Length |
|---|---|---|
| 1. | "21 Guns" | 5:21 |
| 2. | "Favorite Son" (From "Rock Against Bush Vol. 2") | 2:13 |

Promo CD
| No. | Title | Length |
|---|---|---|
| 1. | "21 Guns" (Radio Edit) | 4:37 |

- Musical cast version:

Digital download/CD single
| No. | Title | Length |
|---|---|---|
| 1. | "21 Guns" (Green Day with the cast of American Idiot version) | 4:41 |

21 Guns EP
| No. | Title | Length |
|---|---|---|
| 1. | "21 Guns" (Green Day with the cast of American Idiot version) | 4:41 |
| 2. | "21 Guns" (Original version) | 5:21 |
| 3. | "21 Guns" (live at Akasaka Blitz, Tokyo on May 28, 2009) | 5:01 |

- Live EP:

21 Guns Live EP
| No. | Title | Length |
|---|---|---|
| 1. | "21 Guns" (live in Albany, New York, 2009) | 5:45 |
| 2. | "Welcome to Paradise" (live in Albany, New York, 2009) | 3:45 |
| 3. | "Brain Stew/Jaded" (live in Albany, New York, 2009) | 5:33 |
| 4. | "F.O.D." (live in Madison Square Garden, New York, 2009) | 2:50 |

== Personnel ==
- Billie Joe Armstrong – lead vocals, acoustic and electric guitars, piano
- Mike Dirnt – bass guitar and backing vocals
- Tré Cool – drums and percussion
- Jason Freese – piano
- Butch Vig – production

== Charts ==
=== Weekly charts ===
| Chart (2009–10) | Peak position |
|---|---|
| Australia (ARIA) | 14 |
| Austria (Ö3 Austria Top 40) | 10 |
| Belgium (Ultratop 50 Flanders) | 38 |
| Belgium (Ultratop 50 Wallonia) | 19 |
| Canada Hot 100 (Billboard) | 15 |
| Canada CHR/Top 40 (Billboard) | 48 |
| Canada Hot AC (Billboard) | 23 |
| Canada Rock (Billboard) | 8 |
| Denmark (Tracklisten) | 37 |
| Euro Digital Song Sales (Billboard) | 17 |
| Germany (GfK) | 13 |
| Hungary (Editors' Choice Top 40) | 38 |
| Ireland (IRMA) | 21 |
| Israel (Media Forest) | 3 |
| Italy (FIMI) | 15 |
| Netherlands (Dutch Top 40) | 21 |
| Netherlands (Single Top 100) | 89 |
| New Zealand (Recorded Music NZ) | 3 |
| Scottish Singles Sales (Official Charts) | 5 |
| Spain (Promusicae) | 17 |
| Sweden (Sverigetopplistan) | 8 |
| Switzerland (Schweizer Hitparade) | 13 |
| UK Singles (OCC) | 36 |
| US Billboard Hot 100 | 22 |
| US Adult Pop Airplay (Billboard) | 9 |
| US Alternative Airplay (Billboard) | 3 |
| US Mainstream Rock (Billboard) | 17 |
| US Pop Airplay (Billboard) | 30 |

=== Year-end charts ===
| Chart (2009) | Position |
|---|---|
| Australia (ARIA) | 72 |
| Austria (Ö3 Austria Top 40) | 69 |
| Canada (Canadian Hot 100) | 66 |
| Germany (Official German Charts) | 72 |
| Italy (FIMI) | 75 |
| New Zealand (Recorded Music NZ) | 38 |
| Sweden (Sverigetopplistan) | 37 |
| Switzerland (Schweizer Hitparade) | 60 |
| Taiwan (Yearly Singles Top 100) | 57 |
| US Billboard Hot 100 | 78 |
| US Adult Pop Airplay (Billboard) | 29 |
| US Alternative Airplay (Billboard) | 23 |

| Chart (2010) | Position |
|---|---|
| Austria (Ö3 Austria Top 40) | 56 |

== Certifications ==
| Region | Certification | Certified units/sales |
|---|---|---|
| Australia (ARIA) | Gold | 35,000^{^} |
| Austria (IFPI Austria) | Gold | 15,000^{*} |
| Denmark (IFPI Danmark) | Gold | 45,000^{‡} |
| Italy (FIMI) | Platinum | 20,000^{*} |
| New Zealand (RMNZ) | 2× Platinum | 60,000^{‡} |
| Spain (Promusicae) | Gold | 30,000^{‡} |
| United Kingdom (BPI) | Platinum | 600,000^{‡} |
| United States (RIAA) | Platinum | 1,000,000^{*} |
^{*} Sales figures based on certification alone.^{^} Shipments figures based on certification alone.^{‡} Sales+streaming figures based on certification alone.

== Release history ==
Release dates and formats for "21 Guns"
| Region | Date | Format | Label(s) | Ref. |
|---|---|---|---|---|
| United States | June 15, 2009 | Mainstream airplay | Reprise | |

== See also ==
- List of anti-war songs
