= Know Your Enemy (Green Day song) =

2009 single by Green Day

Single by Green Day

from the album 21st Century Breakdown
- B-side: "Lights Out"; "Hearts Collide"
- Released: April 16, 2009
- Recorded: September 1, 2008
- Genre: Punk rock; pop-punk
- Length: 3:11
- Label: Reprise
- Composer: Green Day
- Lyricist: Billie Joe Armstrong
- Producers: Butch Vig; Green Day

Green Day singles chronology
"The Simpsons Theme" (2007)	"Know Your Enemy" (2009)	"21 Guns" (2009)

Music video
- "Know Your Enemy" on YouTube

"Know Your Enemy" is a protest song by American rock band Green Day. It is the third track on their eighth album, 21st Century Breakdown, and it was released as the lead single through Reprise Records on April 16, 2009, and the group's first single since "Jesus of Suburbia", released 4 years earlier. Billboard described the song as being lyrically "just as politically charged as last time (on American Idiot)", having a "Modern Rock radio-ready chorus", whilst the song's producer Butch Vig "brings enough punk sheen for mass appeal". It was the first, and one of only three songs, to top the Rock Songs, Alternative Songs and Mainstream Rock Tracks Billboard charts at the same time. "Know Your Enemy" has been certified Gold by the RIAA and has sold 798,000 copies as of August 2010.

== Release and reception ==
A snippet of "Know Your Enemy" was released onto Green Day's official website on April 6, 2009. 21st Century Breakdown was later released on May 15, with "Know Your Enemy" as the third song on the standard track list. It was issued as a single on April 16, being the first single released from the album. Peter Gaston of Spin referred to it as sounding "like an out-take from the Dookie sessions". About.com's Bill Lamb said the song was "standard issue Green Day", "not a stroke of genius" and "not on par with their last album", but said it was a "great appetizer" for one of the most eagerly awaited albums of 2009. Pitchfork Media described the track as having "pedantic stiffness" and "nothing more than a rote protest song preaching to the converted". Rolling Stone called the song one of the highlights of the album, praising the punk-oriented sound and calling it one of the "Clash-size bootboy chants" [from the album]. Billboard said that "The lead single from the band's new release, 21st Century Breakdown, finds the group just as politically charged as last time", but also said that "While the subject matter is broad and may be missed by some, 'Enemy' has enough charm to amp up the airwaves until (21st Century) Breakdown is released." Billie Joe Armstrong told Q, "It’s a rallying song. It’s about liberating yourself from a lot of bullshit that you see on TV."

During their 21st Century Breakdown tour show in Minneapolis on July 11, 2009, Billie Joe Armstrong told the crowd that the song had been recorded on the first day of the Republican National Convention in Saint Paul, Minnesota.

== Commercial performance ==
In the United States, "Know Your Enemy" topped the Hot Rock & Alternative Songs chart the week of June 20, 2009. It also went on to peak at number 28 on the Billboard Hot 100 and 36 on the Adult Pop Airplay charts. On July 13, the Recording Industry Association of America (RIAA) certified the song gold. In Canada, "Know Your Enemy" reached number 1 on the Canada Rock chart, and additionally peaked at number 5 and 38 on both the Canadian Hot 100 and CHR/Top 40 charts respectively.

In Europe, the song peaked at number 21 on the UK singles chart for three consecutive weeks. The British Phonographic Industry (BPI) certified "Know Your Enemy" silver on August 27, 2021. On individual national charts, it reached number 20 on the Australia singles chart, 1 on the Czech Republic Airplay chart, 14 in Germany, 17 in Italy, and 11 in both Austria and Ireland. Recorded Music NZ (RMNZ) certified the song gold on October 15, 2015. Additionally, "Know Your Enemy" peaked at number 10 in Sweden, number 16 in Switzerland, 17 in Norway, and 13 in New Zealand. "Know Your Enemy" has also charted on the Scottish Singles chart at number 3, 62 and 6 on the Dutch Top 40 and the Dutch Top 100 charts respectively, and 34 in Denmark.

== Usage in media ==
"Know Your Enemy" was used as the theme song for WWE SmackDown since the show's debut on Syfy from 2010 to 2012.

It is also played at New Orleans Saints and Green Bay Packers games when the away team comes out of the locker room.

FC Halifax Town also use this as their walk out song when playing at home.

The song is also featured on the Awesome as Fuck live album.

The song appears in Shaun White Skateboarding and NHL 10.

It became available as a downloadable song for the music video game Rock Band on July 7, 2009, along with the songs "East Jesus Nowhere" and "21 Guns".

It has been used in the trailers for movies The Spy Next Door and Free Birds as well as being used to promote Comcast and the Wimbledon on ESPN.

== Music video ==
The music video was directed by Motion Theory's Mathew Cullen (who helmed the video for Weezer's "Pork and Beans" in 2008), and it premiered on MTV and other stations across the globe on April 24, 2009. In the video, the band is performing at night on a stage in a field surrounded by a barbed wire fence. Shots of the band are also frequently seen through night vision closed-circuit cameras that surround the field, as well as on helicopters that patrol the area with searchlights. The final chorus of the song shows fire burning behind the silhouettes of the band members. The video was shot in Downtown Los Angeles.

== Personnel ==
- Billie Joe Armstrong - guitar, lead vocals
- Mike Dirnt - bass guitar, backing vocals
- Tré Cool - drums, percussion

== Charts ==
=== Weekly charts ===
Weekly chart performance for "Know Your Enemy"
Chart (2009)	Peak position
Australia (ARIA)	20
Austria (Ö3 Austria Top 40)	11
Belgium (Ultratop 50 Flanders)	26
Belgium (Ultratop 50 Wallonia)	34
Canada Hot 100 (Billboard)	5
Canada CHR/Top 40	38
Canada Hot 100	1
Czech Republic Airplay (ČNS IFPI)	1
Denmark (Tracklisten)	34
Euro Digital Song Sales (Billboard)	20
Germany (GfK)	14
Ireland (IRMA)	11
Italy (FIMI)	17
Netherlands (Dutch Top 40 Tipparade)	6
Netherlands (Single Top 100)	62
New Zealand (Recorded Music NZ)	13
Norway (VG-lista)	17
Scottish Singles Sales (Official Charts)	3
Sweden (Sverigetopplistan)	10
Switzerland (Schweizer Hitparade)	16
UK Singles (Official Charts)	21
US Billboard Hot 100	28
US Adult Pop Airplay (Billboard)	36
US Hot Rock & Alternative Songs (Billboard)	1

=== Year-end charts ===
Year-end chart performance for "Know Your Enemy"
Chart (2009)	Position
Austria (Ö3 Austria Top 40)	61
Canada (Canadian Hot 100)	72
Japan Adult Contemporary (Billboard)	23
US Hot Rock Songs (Billboard)	10

== Certifications ==
Certifications and sales for "Know Your Enemy"
Region	Certification	Certified units/sales
New Zealand (RMNZ)	Gold	7,500^{*}
United Kingdom (BPI)	Silver	200,000^{‡}
United States (RIAA)	Gold	500,000^{^}
^{*} Sales figures based on certification alone.^{^} Shipments figures based on certification alone.^{‡} Sales+streaming figures based on certification alone.
