= Bobby Sox =

2024 single by Green Day

Single by Green Day

from the album Saviors
- Released: January 19, 2024
- Recorded: 2023
- Studio: RAK, London
- Genre: Pop-punk; power pop
- Length: 3:45
- Label: Reprise; Warner
- Songwriters: Billie Joe Armstrong; Mike Dirnt; Tré Cool
- Producers: Rob Cavallo; Green Day

Green Day singles chronology
"One Eyed Bastard" (2024)	"Bobby Sox" (2024)	"Smash It Like Belushi" (2025)

Music video
- "Bobby Sox" on YouTube

"Bobby Sox" is a song by the American rock band Green Day from their fourteenth studio album, Saviors (2024). Released as the album's fifth single, the song was originally written by Billie Joe Armstrong as a love song to his wife, but its lyrics evolved to instead reflect his bisexuality, with Armstrong calling it "the '90s song that we never wrote". It is a pop-punk and power pop song that features similarities to the styles of the Pixies and Weezer.

An accompanying music video for the song, directed by Brendan Walker and Ryan Baxley, was released on January 19, 2024. Shot at a backyard party, the music video finished the string of music videos by being the only one shot fully in color, starting from that of "The American Dream is Killing Me", which was entirely in black-and-white.

"Bobby Sox" received a generally positive reception from music critics, who praised its catchiness and declared it a "bisexual anthem". One critic considered the song's queer-affirming lyrics to be a "bigger blow to the 'MAGA agenda'", while another saw it as relating to people from various sides of life.

Commercially, "Bobby Sox" peaked at number four on the US Rock & Alternative Airplay chart, while appearing on the US Hot Rock & Alternative Songs and single charts from the UK, Canada, and New Zealand. The song was included in the setlist of The Saviors Tour, the concert tour in support of Saviors. It was also included on the soundtrack of the short skate film Monsters & Saviors and released to modern rock radio.

== Background and release ==
Saviors, Green Day's fourteenth studio album, was conceived when Billie Joe Armstrong reconnected with producer Rob Cavallo, who had previously worked with the band on their albums Dookie (1994) and American Idiot (2004). The band subsequently went to RAK Studios in London to make the album, after learning that Liam Gallagher had recorded his 2022 studio album, C'mon You Know, there. Armstrong originally wrote "Bobby Sox" as a love song to his wife, featuring the line "Do you wanna be my girlfriend?", but decided to switch "girlfriend" with "boyfriend" between verses to reflect his bisexuality.

"Bobby Sox" was first announced as the third song on Saviors on November 20, 2023, and was released alongside the album on January 19, 2024, through Reprise and Warner Records. The same day, the song was released as the fifth single on Saviors, alongside its music video. "Bobby Sox" later soundtracked the short skate film Monsters & Saviors, released on August 14, alongside "Longview" and "American Idiot". The song was also released to modern rock radio on September 17.

== Composition and lyrics ==
"Bobby Sox"
A 22.5-second sample of "Bobby Sox", featuring the end of the first chorus and the beginning of the second verse. Armstrong switches from singing "girlfriend" to "boyfriend" between the segments, reflecting his bisexuality.

"Bobby Sox" is a "fuzzed-out" pop-punk and power pop song, with Armstrong calling it "the '90s song that we never wrote". Jon Pareles of The New York Times called the song an "outright homage to Pixies", while various critics drew stylistic comparisons between "Bobby Sox" and songs by Weezer. (Note: Attributed to Andrew Sacher of BrooklynVegan, Emma Swann of DIY, Mark Beaumont of Louder Sound, and Tatiana Tenreyro of Spin.) The song begins with a quiet verse, before building up to a "big, thunderous hard rock chorus". During the chorus, Armstrong sings with a "half-screaming" vocal delivery compared to that of Chester Bennington, while the backing vocals sing a "sugary" falsetto riff.

Lyrically, "Bobby Sox" is a love song where Armstrong "sings to prospective partners". According to Armstrong, the lyric "Do you want to be my girlfriend?" stemmed from a "sweet nothing" which he frequently tells his wife; however, between the first and second verse, Armstrong instead sings "Do you want to be my boyfriend?", both to "play the character of the woman" within the song, and to reflect his bisexuality.

== Critical reception ==
"Bobby Sox" received generally positive reviews from music critics, with Kelly Scanlon of Far Out concluding that the song "enjoys the romantic ambience of its own words while speaking to people from all walks of life". Both Chris Conaton of PopMatters and Andrew Sacher of BrooklynVegan praised the song's catchiness; Conaton further praised Armstrong's "surprisingly intense" vocal performance, while Sacher commented that the song's queer-affirming lyrics were "an even bigger blow to the ‘MAGA agenda'" than some of the band's previous, more directly political songs. Both Stephen Daw of Billboard and Jason Brow of Us Weekly declared the song a "bisexual anthem", while Leah Thomas of Cosmopolitan compared "Bobby Sox" to the television series Heartstopper, and called it one of the best love songs of 2024. Bria McNeal included "Bobby Sox" in her list of the 15 Best Summer Songs of 2024.

== Commercial performance ==
Commercially, "Bobby Sox" peaked at number four on the US Rock & Alternative Airplay chart, which entered on the week of October 5, 2024, and made its peak position on the week of February 1, 2025, remaining in the chart for twenty weeks. The song also debuted and peaked at number 48 on the US Hot Rock & Alternative Songs chart on the week of February 3, 2024.

Internationally, "Bobby Sox" peaked at number 18 on both the Canada Modern Rock and New Zealand Hot Singles charts. The song on the former chart remained for teen weeks prior to its peak position. The song also peaked at number 23 on the UK Rock & Metal Singles chart on the week of January 26, 2024. In the year-end charts of 2025, "Bobby Sox" ranked at number twenty on the US Rock & Alternative Airplay chart and number 62 on the Canada Modern Rock chart.

== Music video ==
=== Background and concept ===
Tré Cool and Mike Dirnt simultaneously kiss Armstrong's cheeks in the music video, reflecting on the song's celebration of love and bisexuality.

The music video for "Bobby Sox" was directed by Brendan Walker and Ryan Baxley, who have also directed the music videos of the previous singles off Saviors. Baxley explained how the music video for "Bobby Sox" is the last in a cycle, starting from that of "The American Dream is Killing Me", which was entirely in black-and-white. The subsequent music videos for "Look Ma, No Brains!" and "Dilemma" then began to incorporate flashes of pink and full color shots, despite primarily being in black-and-white, before the music video of "Bobby Sox" ended this progression by being shot in full color.

Armstrong noted that the music video for "Bobby Sox" was recorded at an actual backyard party, with the band playing a short set before recording began. He commented that the music video was intended to reflect the desire for people to reconnect, following the isolation of COVID-19 lockdowns, and called it one of his favorite videos because it "just felt very real". Baxley further explained how the music video represented the band's love of music and their fans. The music video was released on January 19, 2024, on the band's YouTube channel.

=== Synopsis ===
The music video features Green Day playing the song in a backyard during a "daylight rager". The video includes interspersed shots, some seemingly recorded on "shaky camcorder footage", of crowd members kissing, receiving tattoos, and singing along with the band. The video contains various punk musicians making cameos, including Anaiah Muhammad of Zulu, Lucia and Mila De La Garza of the Linda Lindas, and Violet Mayugba of Destroy Boys. Towards the end of the video, there is a "rapid-fire montage of kisses", including a shot of Tré Cool and Mike Dirnt simultaneously kissing Armstrong's cheeks.

== Live performances ==
On January 18, 2024, Green Day debuted "Bobby Sox", alongside other songs from Saviors, at their show at Irving Plaza as part of the Small Stages Series by SiriusXM. On April 2, 2024, the band played the song during the iHeartRadio Music Awards, alongside "Basket Case"; Armstrong wore a hot pink suit, while Dirnt and Cool were dressed in black. The following day, the band played "Bobby Sox" at the Fillmore, during a charity concert for the "United Nations Right Here, Right Now Global Climate Alliance".

"Bobby Sox" was included in the setlist of The Saviors Tour (2024–25), the concert tour in support of Saviors. On July 26, 2024, Green Day played the song at Rumsey Playfield in Central Park Mall, as part of Good Morning America's Summer Concert Series. The band later played "Bobby Sox" on September 16, with a recording of the song being broadcast on Jimmy Kimmel Live! that night.

== Credits and personnel ==
Personnel taken from Saviors liner notes.

Green Day

- Billie Joe Armstrong – lead vocals, guitar
- Mike Dirnt – bass, backing vocals
- Tré Cool – drums, percussion

Additional personnel

- Rob Cavallo – producer
- Green Day – producers
- Chris Lord-Alge – mixing

== Charts ==
=== Weekly charts ===
Weekly chart performance for "Bobby Sox"
Chart (2024–2025)	Peak position
Canada Modern Rock (Billboard)	18
New Zealand Hot Singles (RMNZ)	18
UK Rock & Metal (Official Charts)	23
US Hot Rock & Alternative Songs (Billboard)	48
US Rock & Alternative Airplay (Billboard)	4

=== Year-end charts ===
Year-end chart performance for "Bobby Sox"
Chart (2025)	Position
Canada Modern Rock (Billboard)	62
US Rock & Alternative Airplay (Billboard)	20

== Release history ==
Release history for "Bobby Sox"
Region	Date	Format(s)	Label	Ref.
United States	September 17, 2024	Modern rock radio	Warner; Crush	
