= Hose (disambiguation) =

A hose is a flexible hollow tube designed to carry fluids from one location to another.

Hose may also refer to:

== Places ==
- Hose, Leicestershire, England
- Hose Mountains, a mountain range in central Sarawak, Malaysia

== Other uses ==
- Hose (surname)
- The Ho Chi Minh Stock Exchange
- HOSE, a term used for playing a mixed game of poker consisting of four different poker games
- Hose (band), "artcore" band from the 1980s
- Hose (album), an album by Hose
- Hose (clothing)
  - Boothose
  - Pantyhose

== See also ==
- Ho (disambiguation)
- Hoser (disambiguation)
- Rubber hose (disambiguation)
