= Hose (surname) =

- Language: English

Origin
- Meaning: "Spur of the land"; "brambles", "thorns"
- Region of origin: Leicestershire, England

Hose is a surname originating from England. It is a topographical name from the Middle English, "hose", "huse" meaning "brambles", "thorns". Derived from Old English "hos", plural of "hoh" meaning "spur of the land" (literally "heel"), a habitational name from a place in Leicestershire.

Notable people with the surname include:

- Adam Hose (born 1992), English cricketer
- Brutil Hosé (born 1979), Dutch footballer
- Charles Hose (1863–1929), British ethnologist
- Edgar Hose (1867–1943), English field hockey player
- Edward Shaw Hose (1871–1946), British colonial administrator
- Ella Hose (born 2005), Australian Paralympic athlete
- Frank Hose (1920–1992), Australian rules footballer
- George Hose (1838–1922), Anglican clergyman
- Henry Hose (fl. 1236–1241), Anglo-Norman noble
- Humphrey Hose (born 1947), Venezuelan tennis player
- John Hose (1928–2016), British trade union leader
- Josh Hose (born 1986), Australian wheelchair rugby player
- Katja Hose (born 1980), Computer scientist
- Martin Hose (born 1961), German classical philologist
- Michael Hose (born 1984), German politician
- Peter Hose (1881–1925), American police officer
- Sam Hose (c. 1875 – 1899), African American worker lynched in 1899
- Simon Hose (born 1967), Australian rules footballer
- Walter Hose (1875–1965), Canadian Royal Navy officer

== See also ==
- Hose (disambiguation)
