= The Saviors Tour =

2024–25 concert tour by Green Day

- Tour by Green Day
- Promotional poster for the tour in North America
- Location: Africa; Asia; Europe; North America; Oceania; South America
- Associated albums: Saviors; Dookie; American Idiot
- Start date: May 30, 2024
- End date: September 30, 2025
- Legs: 7
- No. of shows: 88
- Supporting acts: AFI; Bad Nerves; Donots; Fokofpolisiekar; The Hives; The Interrupters; The Linda Lindas; Nothing but Thieves; The Offspring; Rancid; The Smashing Pumpkins; Private Function; Wunderhorse; Hot Milk

Green Day concert chronology
- Hella Mega Tour (2021–22); The Saviors Tour (2024–25)

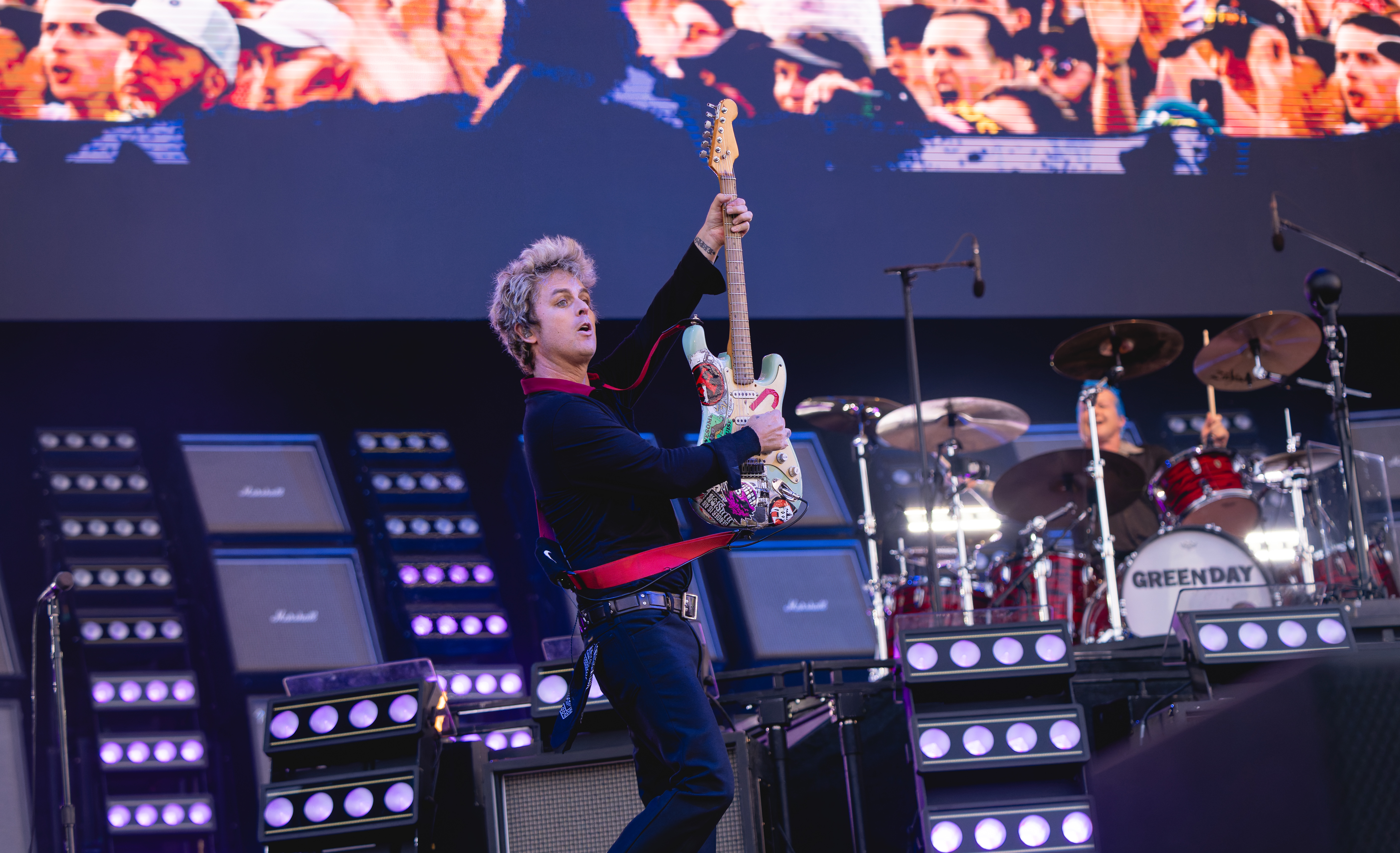
Green Day performing at the Isle of Wight Festival in 2024.

The Saviors Tour was a concert tour by American rock band Green Day in support of the group's fourteenth studio album Saviors. The tour was announced on November 2, 2023, and began on May 30, 2024, at Monte do Gozo in Santiago de Compostela, Spain. The tour concluded on September 30, 2025, at the Yaamava' Resort & Casino in San Bernardino, United States.

The Saviors Tour also celebrated the 30th and 20th anniversaries of their albums Dookie (1994) and American Idiot (2004), respectively. The band performed both albums in their entirety on each date of the tour, except on festival appearances.

== Set lists ==
=== 2024 ===
The following set list was obtained from the concert held on July 29, 2024, at the Nationals Park in Washington, D.C., United States. It does not represent all concerts for the duration of the tour.

Act I

1. "The American Dream Is Killing Me"

Dookie

2. "Burnout"
3. "Having a Blast"
4. "Chump"
5. "Longview"
6. "Welcome to Paradise"
7. "Pulling Teeth"
8. "Basket Case"
9. "She"
10. "Sassafras Roots"
11. "When I Come Around"
12. "Coming Clean"
13. "Emenius Sleepus"
14. "In the End"
15. "F.O.D."
16. "All by Myself" (with orchestral arrangement)

Act II

17. "Know Your Enemy"
18. "Look Ma, No Brains!"
19. "One Eyed Bastard"
20. "Dilemma"
21. "Minority"
22. "Brain Stew"

American Idiot

23. "American Idiot"
24. "Jesus of Suburbia"
25. "Holiday"
26. "Boulevard of Broken Dreams"
27. "Are We the Waiting"
28. "St. Jimmy"
29. "Give Me Novacaine"
30. "She's a Rebel"
31. "Extraordinary Girl"
32. "Letterbomb"
33. "Wake Me Up When September Ends"
34. "Homecoming"
35. "Whatsername"

Encore

36. "Bobby Sox"
37. "Good Riddance (Time of Your Life)"

=== 2025 ===
The following set list was obtained from the concert held on January 19, 2025, at the FNB Stadium in Johannesburg, South Africa, part of the Calabash South Africa festival. It does not represent all concerts for the duration of the tour.

1. "The American Dream Is Killing Me"
2. "Basket Case"
3. "Longview"
4. "Welcome to Paradise"
5. "She"
6. "When I Come Around"
7. "Know Your Enemy"
8. "Hitchin' a Ride"
9. "Dilemma"
10. "21 Guns"
11. "Minority"
12. "Brain Stew"
13. "American Idiot"
14. "Holiday"
15. "Boulevard of Broken Dreams"
16. "Are We the Waiting"
17. "St. Jimmy"
18. "Give Me Novacaine"
19. "Letterbomb"
20. "Wake Me Up When September Ends"
21. "Jesus of Suburbia"
22. "Bobby Sox"
23. "Last Night on Earth"
24. "Good Riddance (Time of Your Life)"

=== Alterations ===
- During the show in San Francisco on September 20, 2024, "Suzie Chapstick" was performed.
- During the show in San Diego on September 28, 2024, "1981" was performed.

== Tour dates ==
List of 2024 concerts, showing date, city, country, venue and opening acts
Date	City	Country	Venue	Opening act(s)
May 30 (Note: The concert in Santiago de Compostela on May 30, 2024, was part of the O Son do Camiño.)	Santiago de Compostela	Spain	Monte do Gozo	—N/a
June 1 (Note: The concert in Madrid on June 1, 2024, was part of the Festival Río Babel.)	Madrid	Spain	Caja Mágica	—N/a
June 5	Décines-Charpieu (Note: Promoted as Lyon.)	France	LDLC Arena	The Interrupters
June 7 (Note: The concert in Nuremberg on June 7, 2024, was part of the Rock im Park.)	Nuremberg	Germany	Zeppelinfeld	—N/a
June 8 (Note: The concert in Nürburg on June 8, 2024, was part of the Rock am Ring.)	Nürburg	Germany	Nürburgring	—N/a
June 10	Berlin	Germany	Waldbühne	Donots
June 11	Hamburg	Germany	Trabrennbahn Bahrenfeld	Donots
June 13 (Note: The concert in Nickelsdorf on June 13, 2024, was part of the Nova Rock Festival.)	Nickelsdorf	Austria	Pannonia Fields	—N/a
June 15 (Note: The concert in Interlaken on June 15, 2024, was part of the Greenfield Festival.)	Interlaken	Switzerland	Interlaken Air Base	—N/a
June 16 (Note: The concert in Milan on June 16, 2024, was part of the IDays Festival.)	Milan	Italy	Ippodromo La Maura	—N/a
June 18	Paris	France	Accor Arena	The Interrupters
June 19	Arnhem	Netherlands	GelreDome	The Hives; The Interrupters
June 21	Manchester	England	Emirates Old Trafford	Nothing but Thieves; Maid of Ace
June 23 (Note: The concert in Newport on June 23, 2024, was part of the Isle of Wight Festival.)	Newport	England	Seaclose Park	—N/a
June 25	Glasgow	Scotland	Bellahouston Park	Nothing but Thieves; Maid of Ace
June 27	Dublin	Ireland	Marlay Park	Nothing but Thieves; Maid of Ace
June 29	London	England	Wembley Stadium	Nothing but Thieves; Maid of Ace
July 29	Washington D.C	United States	Nationals Park	The Smashing Pumpkins; Rancid; The Linda Lindas
August 1	Toronto	Canada	Rogers Centre	The Smashing Pumpkins; Rancid; The Linda Lindas
August 3 (Note: The concert in Montréal on August 3, 2024, was a part of the Osheaga Festival.)	Montréal	Canada	Parc Jean-Drapeau	—N/a
August 5	New York City	United States	Citi Field	The Smashing Pumpkins; Rancid; The Linda Lindas
August 7	Boston	United States	Fenway Park	The Smashing Pumpkins; Rancid; The Linda Lindas
August 9	Philadelphia	United States	Citizens Bank Park	The Smashing Pumpkins; Rancid; The Linda Lindas
August 13	Chicago	United States	Wrigley Field	The Smashing Pumpkins; Rancid; The Linda Lindas
August 15	Maryland Heights	United States	Hollywood Casino Amphiteatre	Rancid; The Linda Lindas
August 17	Minneapolis	United States	Target Field	The Smashing Pumpkins; Rancid; The Linda Lindas
August 20	Bonner Springs (Note: Promoted as Kansas City.)	United States	Azura Amphitheatre	Rancid; The Linda Lindas
August 22	Cincinnati	United States	Great American Ball Park	The Smashing Pumpkins; Rancid; The Linda Lindas
August 24	Milwaukee	United States	American Family Field	The Smashing Pumpkins; Rancid; The Linda Lindas
August 26	Charlotte	United States	PNC Music Pavilion	Rancid; The Linda Lindas
August 28	Cumberland (Note: Promoted as Atlanta.)	United States	Truist Park	The Smashing Pumpkins; Rancid; The Linda Lindas; The Paradox
August 30	Nashville	United States	Geodis Park	The Smashing Pumpkins; Rancid; The Linda Lindas
September 1	Pittsburgh	United States	PNC Park	The Smashing Pumpkins; Rancid; The Linda Lindas
September 2 (Note: Originally scheduled for August 10, 2024, but was rescheduled because Billie Joe Armstrong lost his voice.)	Hershey	United States	Hersheypark Stadium	The Smashing Pumpkins; Rancid; The Linda Lindas
September 4	Detroit	United States	Comerica Park	The Smashing Pumpkins; Rancid; The Linda Lindas
September 7	Denver	United States	Coors Field	The Smashing Pumpkins; Rancid; The Linda Lindas
September 10	Austin	United States	Germania Insurance Amphitheater	Rancid; The Linda Lindas
September 11	Arlington	United States	Globe Life Field	The Smashing Pumpkins; Rancid; The Linda Lindas
September 14	Inglewood (Note: Promoted as Los Angeles.)	United States	SoFi Stadium	The Smashing Pumpkins; Rancid; The Linda Lindas
September 18	Phoenix	United States	Chase Field	The Smashing Pumpkins; Rancid; The Linda Lindas
September 20	San Francisco	United States	Oracle Park	The Smashing Pumpkins; Rancid; The Linda Lindas
September 23	Seattle	United States	T-Mobile Park	The Smashing Pumpkins; Rancid; The Linda Lindas
September 25	Portland	United States	Providence Park	The Smashing Pumpkins; Rancid; The Linda Lindas
September 28	San Diego	United States	Petco Park	The Smashing Pumpkins; Rancid; The Linda Lindas
November 15 (Note: The concert in Mexico City on November 15, 2024, was a part of the Corona Capital music festival.)	Mexico City	Mexico	Autódromo Hermanos Rodríguez	—N/a

List of 2025 concerts, showing date, city, country, venue and opening acts
Date	City	Country	Venue	Opening act(s)
January 19 (Note: The concerts in Nasrec on January 19, and in Cape Town on January 23, 2025, were a part of the Calabash South Africa.)	Nasrec (Note: Promoted as Johannesburg.)	South Africa	FNB Stadium	The Offspring; Fokofpolisiekar
January 23	Cape Town	South Africa	DHL Stadium	The Offspring; Fokofpolisiekar
January 27	Dubai	United Arab Emirates	Expo City	The Offspring
January 30 (Note: The concert in Inglewood on January 30, 2025, was a part of the FireAid.)	Inglewood	United States	Kia Forum	—N/a
February 9	Macau		Galaxy Arena	—N/a
February 12	Pak Kret (Note: Promoted as Bangkok.)	Thailand	IMPACT Arena	—N/a
February 15 (Note: The concert in Jakarta on February 15, 2025, was part of the Hammersonic Festival.)	Jakarta	Indonesia	Carnaval Ancol	Rebellion Rose
February 18	Kuala Lumpur	Malaysia	National Hockey Stadium	—N/a
February 21	Osaka	Japan	Osaka-jo Hall	Aburina Town
February 23	Nagoya	Japan	Nagoya International Exhibition Hall	Otoboke Beaver
February 25	Yokohama	Japan	Yokohama Arena	Otoboke Beaver
February 26	Yokohama	Japan	Yokohama Arena	Otoboke Beaver
March 1	Melbourne	Australia	Marvel Stadium	AFI; Private Function
March 3	Sydney	Australia	ENGIE Stadium	AFI; Private Function
March 8 (Note: The concert in Mumbai on March 8, 2025, was part of the Lollapalooza India.)	Mumbai	India	Mahalaxmi Racecourse	—N/a
April 4 (Note: The concert in Monterrey on April 4, 2025, was part of the Pa'l Norte.)	Monterrey	Mexico	Parque Fundidora	—N/a
April 12 (Note: The concerts in Indio on April 12 and 19, 2025, were part of the Coachella.)	Indio	United States	Empire Polo Club	—N/a
April 19	Indio	United States	Empire Polo Club	—N/a
May 16 (Note: The concerts in Daytona Beach on May 16, 2025, was part of the Welcome to Rockville.)	Daytona Beach	United States	Daytona International Speedway	—N/a
May 23 (Note: The concerts in Napa on May 23, 2025, was part of the BottleRock Napa Valley.)	Napa	United States	Napa Valley Expo	—N/a
June 13 (Note: The concert in Leicestershire on June 13, 2025, was part of the Download Festival.)	Leicestershire	England	Donington Park	—N/a
June 15 (Note: The concert in Florence on June 15, 2025, was part of the Firenze Rocks.)	Florence	Italy	Visarno Arena	—N/a
June 17	Vienna	Austria	Wiener Stadthalle	Wunderhorse
June 18	Vienna	Austria	Wiener Stadthalle	Wunderhorse
June 20 (Note: The concert in Neuhausen ob Eck on June 20, 2025, was part of the Southside Festival.)	Neuhausen ob Eck	Germany	Neuhausen ob Eck Airfield	—N/a
June 22 (Note: The concert in Scheeßel on June 22, 2025, was part of the Hurricane Festival.)	Scheeßel	Germany	Eichenring	—N/a
June 24 (Note: The concert in Stockholm on June 24, 2025, was part of the STHLM Fields.)	Stockholm	Sweden	Gärdets Sports Fields	—N/a
June 26 (Note: The concert in Oslo on June 26, 2025, was part of the Tons of Rock festival.)	Oslo	Norway	Ekebergsletta	—N/a
June 28 (Note: The concert in Odense on June 28, 2025, was part of the Tinderbox Festival.)	Odense	Denmark	Tusindårsskoven	—N/a
June 30 (Note: The concert in Luxembourg on June 30, 2025, was part of the Luxexpo Open Air series of concerts.)	Luxembourg	Luxembourg	Luxexpo The Box	—N/a
July 2	Amsterdam	Netherlands	Ziggo Dome	Hot Milk
July 4 (Note: The concert in Werchter on July 4, 2025, was part of the Rock Werchter.)	Werchter	Belgium	Werchter Festivalpark	—N/a
July 6 (Note: The concert in Athens on July 6, 2025, was part of the Ejekt festival.)	Athens	Greece	Athens Olympic Sports Complex	—N/a
July 18 (Note: The concert in Ottawa on July 18, 2025, was part of the Ottawa Bluesfest.)	Ottawa	Canada	LeBreton Flats	—N/a
July 20 (Note: The concert in St. Paul on July 20, 2025, was part of the Minnesota Yacht Club festival.)	St. Paul	United States	Harriet Island	—N/a
August 24	Bogotá	Colombia	Vive Claro	Bad Nerves
August 27	Lima	Peru	Estadio Universidad San Marcos	Bad Nerves
August 30	Santiago	Chile	Parque Estadio Nacional	Bad Nerves; BBS Paranoicos
September 3	Buenos Aires	Argentina	Huracán Stadium	Bad Nerves; 2 Minutos
September 7 (Note: The concert in São Paulo on September 7, 2025, was a part of The Town.)	São Paulo	Brazil	Autódromo de Interlagos	—N/a
September 12	Curitiba	Brazil	Arena da Baixada	Bad Nerves
September 15	Asunción	Paraguay	Jockey Club	Bad Nerves
September 21 (Note: The concert in Chicago on September 21, 2025, was a part of the Riot Fest.)	Chicago	United States	Douglass Park	—N/a
September 26 (Note: The concert in Ocean City on September 26, 2025, was a part of the Oceans Calling Festival.)	Ocean City	United States	Ocean City Inlet Beach	—N/a
September 28 (Note: The concert in Dana Point on September 28, 2025, was a part of the Ohana Festival.)	Dana Point	United States	Doheny State Beach	—N/a
September 30	San Bernardino	United States	Yaamava' Theatre	—N/a

== Cancelled shows ==
List of cancelled concerts, showing date, city, country, venue and reason
Date	City	Country	Venue	Reason
March 5, 2025	Gold Coast	Australia	Cbus Super Stadium	Cyclone Alfred
September 9, 2025	Rio de Janeiro	Brazil	Estádio Nilton Santos	Scheduling conflicts

== Personnel ==
Personnel adapted from different sources.

Green Day:

- Billie Joe Armstrong – lead vocals, guitar
- Tré Cool – drums, backing vocals
- Mike Dirnt – bass, backing vocals

Touring musicians:

- Kevin Preston – guitar, backing vocals
- Jason White – guitar, backing vocals
- Coley O'Toole – keyboards, backing vocals (May 30 – August 13, 2024)
- Jason Freese – keyboards, piano, saxophone, accordion, backing vocals (August 15, 2024 – present)

Tour production:

- Brendan Walter – creative director
- Sooner Routhier – production designer
- Corinne Merolla – production designer
- Matthew Geasey – technical designer
- Dane Kick – LX programming
- Joe Lott – LX programming
- Fragment 9 – content design, content programming
- SRND Studio – content design
- Aron Altmark – notch design
- Jackson Gallagher – content programming
- Allison Ciccarelli – creative producer
- Dulce Martin-Breum – creative producer
- Niccolo Cascino – business manager
- Scott Nagelberg – management
- Chris Dugan – management
- Bill Schneider – management
- Tait Towers – staging, automation
- Airworks – inflatables
- Upstaging – lighting
- Patrick Eaton – video
- 8th Day Sound – audio
- Pyrotek Special Effects - SFX
- Marshall – props
- Stuart Merser – server
- Chris Littleton – tour manager
- Jamie Stephens – assistant tour manager
- Amanda Forbes – tour manager assistant
- Jason Zito – production manager
- Kate Buckner – production coordinator
- Amanda Martinez – production assistant
- Alli Harvey – dressing room coordinator
- Hannah Kinkead – wardrobe
- Ethan Merfy – stage manager
- Barb Pinnow – automation
- Thomas Nasarro - SFX tech
- Janessa Macintosh - SFX tech
- Josh Hedge – SFX Crew Chief
- Kenn MacDonald – SFX Operator
- Tommy Horton Jr – lighting designer
- Devin Turner – video operation
- Ray Gwilliams – media servers
- Darren Montague – video director
- Sam Castaneda - Director of Personal Security
- A.J. Schlegel - Personal Security
- Devin Slaughter - Personal Security
- Brian Mersis - Personal Security
- Mike Faello - Director of Venue Security
- Mark Mitchell - Venue Security
- Don Volkenburg - Venue Security

== See also ==
- List of Billboard Boxscore number-one concert series of the 2020s
