= Janiva Ellis =

American artist (born 1987)

- Born: 1987 (age 38–39); Oakland, California, U.S.
- Education: California College of the Arts
- Known for: Painting

Janiva Ellis (born 1987) is an American painter based in Brooklyn, NY and Los Angeles, CA. Ellis creates figurative paintings that explore the African-American female experience, while incorporating her journey of self-identity within the Black community.

== Early life and education ==
Born in Oakland, California, Ellis is biracial. Her mother is white, and her father is black. She was raised by her mother and moved to Hawaii at the age of 7, moving between the islands of Kauai and Oahu. From the age of 10 to 16, she lived in Kauai. She started painting at age 10, and was mentored by Tammy Day, a 20-year-old black woman. Hawaii has a small Black population, and Ellis' work investigates the complex racial dynamic of her upbringing and the biracial origins of her identity.

Ellis studied painting at the California College of the Arts in San Francisco, graduating in 2012.

== Professional onset ==
Upon graduating in 2012, Ellis took a pause from the art world and returned to Hawaii. Ellis did not find any inspiration from the New York art scene, nor companions of the same ethnic background. This was a big loss for Ellis's self identity and reasons why she left Hawaii to begin with. After taking a few years to find herself, Ellis returned to New York in 2017 with a new outlook on her upbringing and a sense of self identity being both black and white.

In one of Ellis's recent works, The Angles, held at the Hammer Vault Gallery, in Los Angeles, California, she relates her experience of feeling confusion and chaos of the self and the beauty of when one finds the self and accepts what is to be in the work. Critic Aram Moshayedi writes, "Decay and loss permeateThe Angels, yet the intimate experience of looking closely and allowing oneself to succumb to the painting’s wrapping embrace reveals moments of flourish and signs of life amidst the debris."

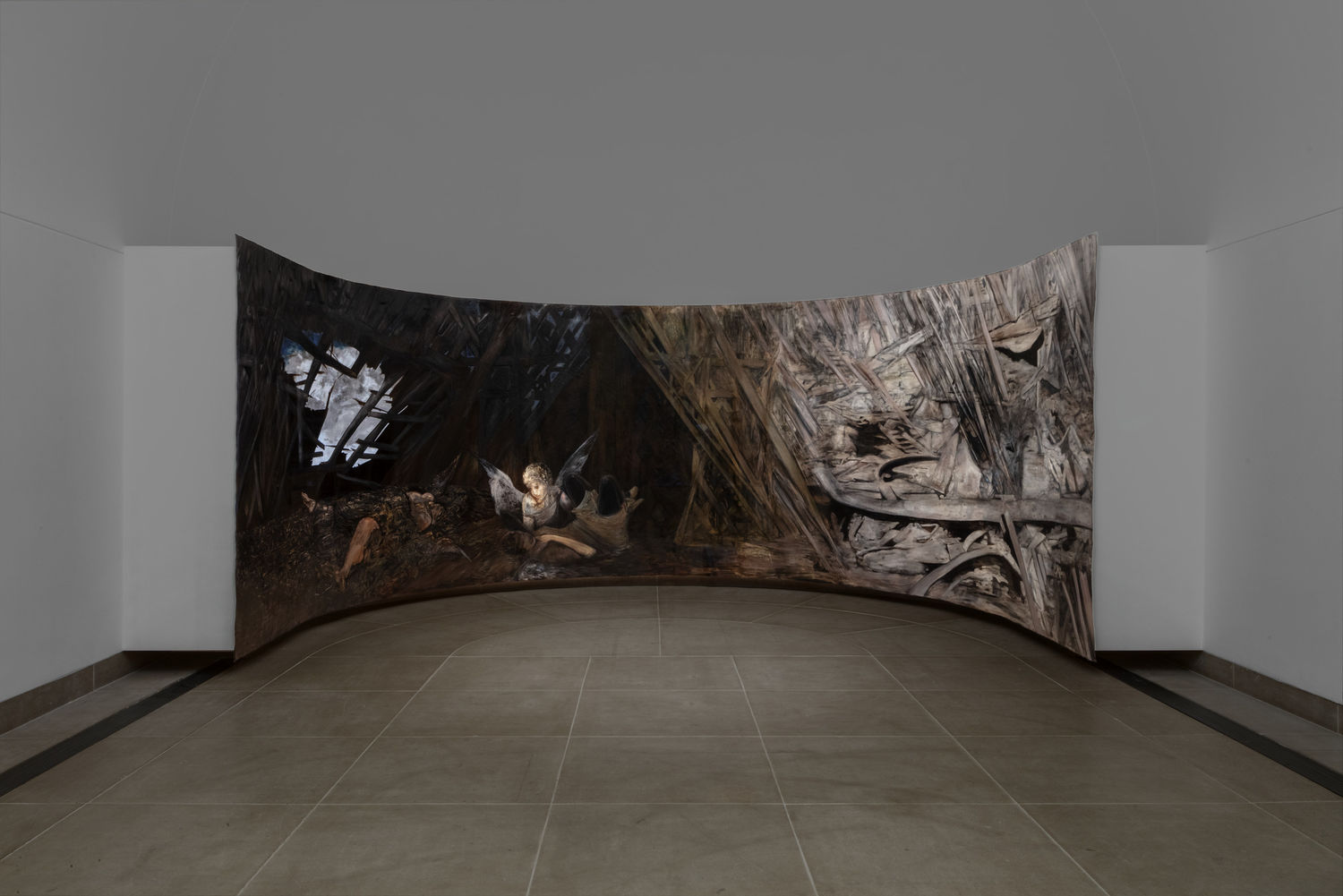
Janiva Ellis, The Angles, Hammer Projects (2022), Oil on Canvas

== Artistic practice ==
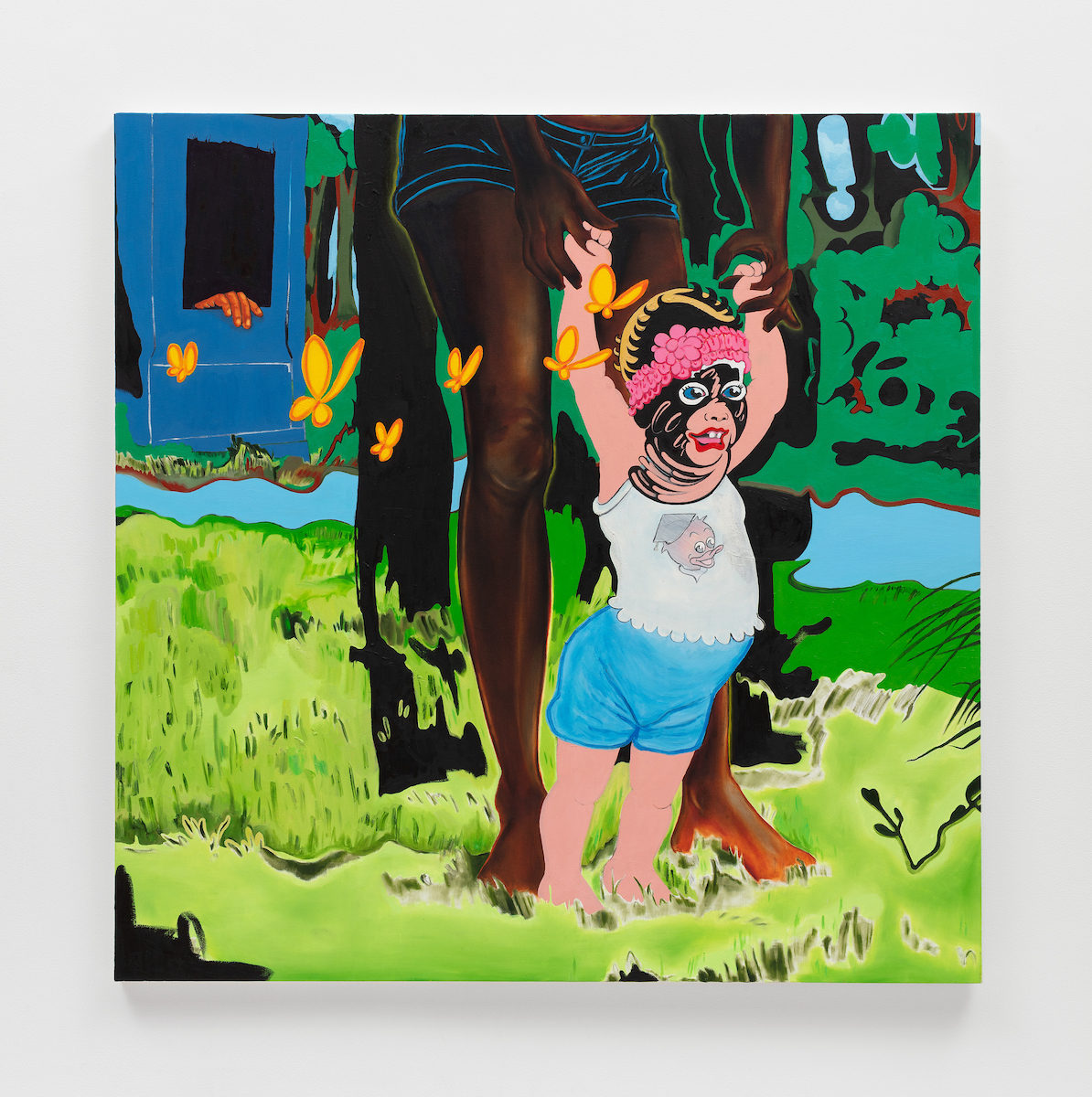
Janiva Ellis, "Doubt-Guardian", 2018, Oil on Canvas

Ellis describes her paintings as, “not only an attempt to communicate to nonblack women my experience, but also to call to other black women, ‘Do you feel this, too?’” Critic Rachel Corbett has commended Ellis for the psychoanalytic tension in her paintings, stating "The calm country landscapes in the background of Ellis’s paintings clash with her psychologically tormented subjects, who are often tyrannized by cartoon characters." Occasionally, Ellis's paintings incorporate religious symbology; such as lambs or angels, referencing the canon of religious painting. In each of her works Ellis continues to share her story incorporating different parts of her self identity. In 2017, Ellis presented "Lick Shot" at 47 Canal, her first solo show in New York City. In 2018, Ellis participated in the New Museum Triennial - “Songs for Sabotage.” Then in 2019 Ellis was included in the Whitney Biennial curated by Rujeko Hockley and Jane Panetta. In the 2025 exhibition "Fear Corroded Ape," her work was presented at Harvard University's Carpenter Center for the Visual Arts.

== Art career ==
- 2017 - "You Catch More Flies With Arsenic Than Honey” - Club Pro, Los Angeles, California
- 2017 - "Cabin Fever" - BBQLA, Los Angeles California
- 2017 - "Lick Shot” - 47 Canal, New York City
- 2017 - "Prick Up Your Ears” - Karma International, Los Angeles, California
- 2018 - “Painting: Now & Forever, Part III” - Greene Naftali, New York City
- 2018 - Triennial: “Songs for Sabotage” - New Museum, New York City
- 2018 - "Keebler’s Revenge" -The American Academy of Arts and Letters, New York City
- 2019 - Whitney Biennial 2019, Whitney Museum of American Art, New York City
- 2021 - "Janiva Ellis: Rats" - Institute of Contemporary Art, Miami
- 2022 - "The Angles" - Hammer Vault Gallery, Los Angeles, California
- 2025 - "Fear Corroded Ape" - Harvard University's Carpenter Center for the Visual Arts

== Awards ==
- Rema Hort Mann Foundation Grant, 2018
- Stanley Hollander Award, 2018
