= Saviors (album) =

Studio album by Green Day
- Released: January 19, 2024
- Recorded: 2021–2023
- Studios: RAK (London); United Recordings (Los Angeles)
- Genres: Punk rock; power pop; pop-punk; alternative rock
- Length: 46:02
- Label: Reprise
- Producers: Rob Cavallo; Green Day

Green Day chronology
BBC Sessions (2021)	Saviors (2024)	Nimrods Original Soundtrack (2026)

Green Day studio chronology
Father of All Motherfuckers (2020)	Saviors (2024)

Singles from Saviors
- 1. "The American Dream Is Killing Me" Released: October 24, 2023; 2. "Look Ma, No Brains!" Released: November 2, 2023; 3. "Dilemma" Released: December 7, 2023; 4. "One Eyed Bastard" Released: January 5, 2024; 5. "Bobby Sox" Released: January 19, 2024

Singles from Saviors (Édition de Luxe)
- 1. "Smash It Like Belushi" Released: April 9, 2025; 2. "Ballyhoo" Released: May 2, 2025

Saviors is the fourteenth studio album by the American rock band Green Day, released on January 19, 2024, through Reprise Records. It received generally positive reviews from critics. The album was promoted through five singles: "The American Dream Is Killing Me", "Look Ma, No Brains!", "Dilemma", "One Eyed Bastard" and "Bobby Sox". The band embarked on the Saviors Tour, a global concert series in support of the album, with 87 shows in six continents.

Saviors was nominated at the 67th Annual Grammy Awards for Best Rock Album.

== Background and promotion ==
In an interview with Zane Lowe on Beats 1, Billie Joe Armstrong stated that seven songs had not made it to their last album, Father of All Motherfuckers (2020), which was produced by Butch Walker, and was met with mixed reviews. Later, it was confirmed that long-time friend of the band Rob Cavallo would be producing the album. Cavallo had worked with them on most of their previous albums, including Dookie (1994), and American Idiot (2004), although they had not worked together for almost 10 years, by 2022, since the release of ¡Tré! (2012).

In February 2021, one year after the previous album's release, "Here Comes the Shock", a song produced by Butch Walker, debuted as part of the band's two-year deal with the NHL. Another standalone song, "Pollyanna", self-produced by the band, was released in May 2021, to celebrate the Hella Mega Tour, which had been postponed due to the COVID-19 pandemic. In November 2021, the band released another song, titled "Holy Toledo!", which was also produced by Walker, and was used in the soundtrack of the 2021 film Mark, Mary & Some Other People.

Saviors was recorded in London, England, and Los Angeles, California. Early reports claimed that their forthcoming record would be titled 1972, signifying the year all three members were born. The band would post teasers on social media, pointing that the album's name would in fact be that. The first of them dates back to December 2021, more than two years before the album was eventually released, now named Saviors.

Prior to the album's release, the band played "1981" during their live performance at Festival d'été de Québec on July 16, 2023. The band announced the album on October 24, 2023, and released its lead single "The American Dream Is Killing Me" alongside its music video. While it was the first track written for the album, it was kept in a box for a while, according to Billie Joe Armstrong, who revealed that once they recorded it, they immediately decided to release the song as the lead single. The track constitutes "a look at the way the traditional American Dream doesn't work for a lot of people" but hurts them instead. Until its release the band would post clips of the music video and snippets of the lyrics in the single's promo website (www.theamericandreamiskillingme.com). The song was played live for the first time, along with another song from the album titled "Look Ma, No Brains!" at the When We Were Young festival in Las Vegas, Nevada. On November 4, 2023, the band played "1981" again during a live show at the Bataclan in Paris, France.

On the same day, the track list was leaked on Banquet Records, a UK record store, before later being confirmed by Warner Music's site. The length of the songs on the tracklist was leaked by Qobuz. The second single, "Look Ma, No Brains!", was released on November 2, 2023. Armstrong stated in an interview with Amazon Prime, that it was his favorite track off the album and one of the greatest punk songs he'd ever written. One month later, on December 4, 2023, the band announced "Dilemma" as the album's third single. It came out on December 7, 2023, along with a Christmas themed music video. On New Year's Eve, Green Day performed the song live for the first time on the television special Dick Clark's New Year's Rockin' Eve. They also performed "American Idiot", where Armstrong replaced the line "I'm not a part of a redneck agenda" with "I'm not a part of the MAGA agenda", a reference to Donald Trump's "Make America Great Again" slogan, in criticism of the (then) former US president.

The album's fourth single, "One Eyed Bastard", was released on January 5, 2024, alongside an animated video. On the evening of January 16, 2024, the band appeared in a surprise performance in the 47th–50th Streets–Rockefeller Center station of the New York subway system, with late-night host Jimmy Fallon joining them on tambourine to help draw attention to the upcoming album and tour, and played several songs including "Look Ma, No Brains!", "Basket Case", and "American Idiot". Armstrong also left space to let the subway crowd sing out the song's revised line "I'm not a part of the MAGA agenda". The album, along with a music video for "Bobby Sox", came out on January 19, 2024. A music video for "Corvette Summer" was released on July 23, 2024.

On January 13, 2024, six days before the album released, the band held listening parties for the album in various independent record stores across the world.

Green Day completed legs of the Saviors Tour through North America and Europe in the summer and autumn of 2024. Nothing but Thieves, the Hives, the Interrupters, Donots and Maid of Ace were announced as openers on the European leg starting in May. The Smashing Pumpkins, Rancid, and the Linda Lindas served the same role on the North American leg of the tour, which began in July and concluded in September. The tour also included various festival performances and a shorter second European leg, as well as performances in Asia, Australia, South Africa slated for late 2024 and 2025. The band performed their albums Dookie and American Idiot in their entirety, celebrating their 30th and 20th anniversaries, respectively.

On April 9, 2025, Green Day announced the deluxe edition of Saviors, titled in French Saviors (Édition De Luxe), with "Smash It Like Belushi" released as the first single. "Ballyhoo" was released as the second single of Saviors deluxe on May 2, 2025. The deluxe edition, and an official music video for "One Eyed Bastard", were both released on May 23, 2025.

A music video for "Suzie Chapstick" was released on October 30, 2025.

== Cover art ==
The album cover is an edited version of a photo taken in 1978 by Chris Steele-Perkins at a riot during the Troubles in Northern Ireland. It depicts a youth named Paul Kennedy, holding a stone and shrugging, on the Falls Road, Belfast in front of a moving car with a burning garbage pile in the background. In the final version, the young man's face was altered to have a more smiling look.

== Critical reception ==
Professional ratings
Aggregate scores
Source	Rating
Metacritic	73/100
Review scores
Source	Rating
AllMusic	3.5/5 stars
Clash	7/10
DIY	5/5 stars
Kerrang!	4/5
LouderSound	4/5 stars
NME	4/5 stars
Pitchfork	5.1/10
The Skinny	4/5 stars
Uncut	7/10
Wall of Sound	7.5/10

Saviors received a score of 73 out of 100 on review aggregator Metacritic based on 21 critics' reviews, indicating "generally favorable" reception. DIY's Emma Swann called the album "an outstanding record that showcases that same still unrivalled ability to incorporate biting social commentary within perfect, three-minute pop (punk) songs." NME's Andrew Trendell called it Green Day's best album since American Idiot as well as "an act of defiance met with a shrug; a band saying, 'We're still here and we're still fucked'". Uncut wrote that the band "unleash 15 compact, primarily pro forma bangers". Reviewing the album for AllMusic, senior editor Stephen Thomas Erlewine noted that "Green Day sound exactly like what they are: rock & roll lifers settling into middle age, irritated by some shifts in culture but still finding sustenance in the music they've loved for decades." and concluded that, "Age may dampen Green Day's roar, but it has also heightened their songcraft, and that's reason enough to give Saviors time to let its hooks sink in. "

On November 8, 2024, Saviors was nominated for Best Rock Album at the 67th Annual Grammy Awards, which took place on February 2, 2025. Green Day picked up further nominations in Best Rock Song for "Dilemma", and in Best Rock Performance for "The American Dream is Killing Me". These are the first Grammy nominations Green Day have received since ¡Cuatro! (2013) was nominated for Best Music Film in 2014.

Loudwire ranked it as the 10th best rock album of 2024.

== Commercial performance ==
Saviors debuted at number four on the Billboard 200 with 49,000 album-equivalent units including 39,000 pure album sales, 9,500 streaming equivalent units and 500 track equivalent albums. An additional 7,000 traditional albums (CD, vinyl, cassette and digital downloads) were sold in the second week, 6,000 copies were sold in the third week. In its first week, 10,390 copies of the album were sold through independent record stores. These sales were not included in the Billboard 200. As of April 2024, the album has sold 108,000 album-equivalent units in the United States, and racking up almost 200,000 worldwide.

The album debuted at number one in the UK with 31,361 album-equivalent units, including 1,493 units from digital downloads, 3,369 from sales-equivalent streams.

== Track listing ==
All lyrics are written by Billie Joe Armstrong; all music is composed by Billie Joe Armstrong, Mike Dirnt, and Tré Cool.

Saviors track listing
No.	Title	Length
1.	"The American Dream Is Killing Me"	3:06
2.	"Look Ma, No Brains!"	2:03
3.	"Bobby Sox"	3:44
4.	"One Eyed Bastard"	2:52
5.	"Dilemma"	3:18
6.	"1981"	2:09
7.	"Goodnight Adeline"	2:56
8.	"Coma City"	3:28
9.	"Corvette Summer"	3:02
10.	"Suzie Chapstick"	3:16
11.	"Strange Days Are Here to Stay"	3:05
12.	"Living in the'20s"	2:06
13.	"Father to a Son"	3:54
14.	"Saviors"	2:55
15.	"Fancy Sauce"	4:01
Total length:		45:55

Japanese edition bonus track
No.	Title	Length
16.	"Fever" ( (Note: "Fever" is track 23 on Japanese version of Saviors (Édition De Luxe)))	2:23
Total length:		48:26

Saviors (édition de luxe) track listing
No.	Title	Length
16.	"Smash It Like Belushi"	2:49
17.	"Stay Young"	4:10
18.	"Fuck Off"	2:03
19.	"Ballyhoo"	2:46
20.	"Suzie Chapstick" (acoustic)	3:01
21.	"Father to a Son" (acoustic)	3:53
22.	"Underdog"	2:14
Total length:		66:50

Saviors (édition de luxe) - June 6, 2025 digital re-issue track listing
No.	Title	Length
23.	"Fuck Off" (Fidlar Alt Mix)	2:09
Total length:		68:59

Saviors (édition de luxe) - August 29, 2025 digital re-issue track listing
No.	Title	Length
24.	"One Eyed Bastard" (Live in Amsterdam)	3:06
Total length:		72:05

== Personnel ==
Green Day

- Billie Joe Armstrong – lead vocals, guitars, production
- Mike Dirnt – bass, backing vocals, production
- Tré Cool – drums, percussion, production

Additional musicians

- Rob Cavallo – additional guitar on "Suzie Chapstick" and "Saviors", additional piano on "Suzie Chapstick", string and horn arrangements on "The American Dream Is Killing Me"
- Butch Walker – acoustic guitar on "Goodnight Adeline"
- David Campbell – string and horn arrangements, conducting on "The American Dream Is Killing Me" and "Father to a Son"

Production

- Rob Cavallo – producer (all tracks)
- Chris Lord-Alge – mixing
- Ted Jensen – mastering
- Chris Dugan – engineering, mixing on "Fever"
- Greyson Smith – editing
- Butch Walker – additional engineering (all tracks), producer on "Fever"
- Mark Aguilar – additional engineering
- Brian Judd – mixing assistance
- Duncan Fuller – engineering assistance
- Jacob Spitzer – engineering assistance
- Scott Moore – engineering assistance
- Nathaniel Mela – drum technician
- Andrew Hans Buscher – guitar technician

Artwork

- Chris Steele-Perkins – artwork
- Emma America – photography
- Alice Baxley – photography
- Ryan Baxley – graphic design
- Brendan Walter – graphic design
- Alex Tenta – graphic design

== Charts ==
=== Weekly charts ===
Weekly chart performance for Saviors
Chart (2024)	Peak position
Australian Albums (ARIA)	2
Austrian Albums (Ö3 Austria)	2
Belgian Albums (Ultratop Flanders)	6
Belgian Albums (Ultratop Wallonia)	5
Canadian Albums (Billboard)	4
Croatian International Albums (HDU)	1
Czech Albums (ČNS IFPI)	44
Danish Vinyl Albums (Hitlisten)	1
Dutch Albums (Album Top 100)	6
Finnish Albums (Suomen virallinen lista)	26
French Albums (SNEP)	7
German Albums (Offizielle Top 100)	2
Hungarian Albums (MAHASZ)	1
Irish Albums (Official Charts)	2
Italian Albums (FIMI)	5
Japanese Albums (Oricon)	14
Japanese Combined Albums (Oricon)	17
Japanese Hot Albums (Billboard Japan)	10
Japanese Rock Albums (Oricon)	3
New Zealand Albums (RMNZ)	6
Polish Albums (ZPAV)	27
Portuguese Albums (AFP)	7
Scottish Albums (Official Charts)	1
Spanish Albums (Promusicae)	8
Swedish Albums (Sverigetopplistan)	46
Swiss Albums (Schweizer Hitparade)	3
Swiss Albums (Romandie)	1
UK Albums (Official Charts)	1
UK Rock & Metal Albums (Official Charts)	1
US Billboard 200	4
US Top Alternative Albums (Billboard)	1
US Top Rock Albums (Billboard)	1

=== Year-end charts ===
Year-end chart performance for Saviors
Chart (2024)	Position
Croatian International Albums (HDU)	9
UK CD Albums (OCC)	16
UK Vinyl Albums (OCC)	32
US Top Alternative Albums (Billboard)	39
US Top Rock Albums (Billboard)	75

== Certifications ==
Certifications for Saviors
Region	Certification	Certified units/sales
United Kingdom (BPI)	Silver	60,000^{‡}
^{‡} Sales+streaming figures based on certification alone.

== Release history ==
Release history and formats for Saviors
Region	Date	Format	Version	Label
Various	January 19, 2024	Digital download; streaming; LP; CD; cassette	Standard	Reprise
Various	May 23, 2025	Digital download; streaming; LP; CD	Édition de luxe	Reprise
