= Dilemma (Green Day song) =

Single by Green Day

from the album Saviors
- Released: December 7, 2023
- Studio: RAK, London
- Genre: Punk rock; pop-punk; power pop
- Length: 3:18
- Label: Reprise
- Composers: Billie Joe Armstrong; Mike Dirnt; Tré Cool
- Lyricist: Billie Joe Armstrong
- Producers: Rob Cavallo; Green Day

Green Day singles chronology
"Look Ma, No Brains!" (2023)	"Dilemma" (2023)	"One Eyed Bastard" (2024)

Music video
- "Dilemma" on YouTube

"Dilemma" is a song by American rock band Green Day from their fourteenth studio album, Saviors (2024). The fifth song on the album, "Dilemma" is a punk rock song which has been stylistically compared to power pop and '50s rock. The song is lyrically inspired by frontman Billie Joe Armstrong's struggles with alcohol addiction and mental health.

"Dilemma" was first released on December 7, 2023, as the third single from Saviors. The accompanying music video for the song, directed by Ryan Baxley, begins with an intoxicated Armstrong having what seems to be a fun night out, before revealing the actual "uglier" events from the night. "Dilemma" received acclaim from music critics, with multiple declaring it as a standout track on Saviors. The song is included in the setlist of The Saviors Tour, the ongoing concert tour in support of Saviors. "Dilemma" topped the US Rock & Alternative Airplay and the Canada Rock charts, and was nominated for Best Rock Song at the 67th Annual Grammy Awards.

== Background and release ==
"Dilemma" was inspired by frontman Billie Joe Armstrong's struggles with alcoholism. Following an onstage meltdown during the 2012 iHeartRadio Music Festival, Armstrong first entered rehab for his alcohol addiction; however, after five years of sobriety, he noted how he gradually began to drink excessively again, and struggled to receive help due to loneliness and feeling unable to receive help through organizations like Alcoholics Anonymous due to being a celebrity. Armstrong noted on The Howard Stern Show how he wrote the song while drinking, and has called it one of the most honest songs he had ever written.

Alongside other songs from Saviors, "Dilemma" was recorded at RAK Studios in London after the band learned that Liam Gallagher recorded his studio album C'mon You Know there. The band teased the single release on December 4, 2023, through a "festive" social media post featuring a photo booth image strip and the text "A Very Green Day Holiday!" On December 7, "Dilemma" was made available for digital download and streaming as the third single off Saviors, and an accompanying music video was simultaneously released to the band's YouTube channel.

== Composition and lyrics ==
"Dilemma"
A 19-second sample of "Dilemma". The song's introduction consists of Armstrong singing over a "nostalgic-sounding" chord progression played on an electric guitar, before a drum hits and the song takes on a heavier sound.

"Dilemma" is a "punk bossa nova" song which stylistically draws from power pop, doo-wop, and '50s rock. The song begins with a slow, "nostalgic-sounding" introduction containing only an electric guitar for instrumentation. Afterwards, the introduction finishes with an open cadence, before a drum hits and the song transitions into a heavier sound more reminiscent of "classic Green Day". Dana Poland of Slant commented on the song's "bright, Beach Boys-esque guitar tones", which complemented its "bursts of pop-punk energy". Marko Djurdjić of Exclaim! stylistically compared "Dilemma" to songs by the Menzingers, while Kory Grow of Rolling Stone noted that the song was likely inspired by Ramones.

Lyrically, "Dilemma" focuses on Armstrong's struggles with alcoholism and mental health. Armstrong explained that the lyric "I was sober, now I'm drunk again" from the chorus could be seen as both a celebratory statement for having gotten drunk, or as a representation of "someone that's fallen". Armstrong also acknowledged how the first line of the song, "Welcome to my problems, it's not an invitation", was designed to be self-pitying akin to a Facebook post, but commented that people should interpret the lyric how they want.

== Reception ==
=== Critical response ===
"Dilemma" received acclaim from music critics, with Far Out's Kelly Scanlon calling it a "punk anthem destined to infiltrate your mind for weeks, if not months". Tom Breihan of Stereogum praised the composition of "Dilemma" for being "fun" and "catchy", while Kory Grow of Rolling Stone called the song a "plaintive, swinging rocker". The song's lyrics have also received positive reviews, with The Independent's Helen Brown calling "Dilemma" an "enjoyably self-pitying whinge" and BrooklynVegan's Andrew Sacher calling the lyrics some of the "most impacting" on Saviors. Multiple critics regarded "Dilemma" as a standout on Saviors, (Note: Attributed to Jon Pareles of The New York Times, Madison Walters of New Noise Magazine, Mark Richardson of The Wall Street Journal, and Michael Gallucci of Ultimate Classic Rock.) with Madison Walters of New Noise Magazine going as far as to declare it "one of the best songs Green Day has ever released".

==== Accolades ====
Nominations for "Dilemma"
Award	Category	Result	Ref.
2025 Grammy Awards	Best Rock Song	Nominated	

=== Commercial performance ===
On April 6, 2024, "Dilemma" topped Billboard's Rock & Alternative Airplay chart, making it the eighth song by the band to do so. "Dilemma" also individually topped Billboard's Mainstream Rock Airplay chart and Alternative Airplay chart on April 27 and May 4 respectively, becoming the ninth and thirteenth song by the band to do so. Outside the United States, "Dilemma" also topped the Canada Rock chart, and charted in New Zealand, Germany, and the Czech Republic.

== Music video ==
The music video for "Dilemma", directed by Ryan Baxley, was released on December 7, 2023, to coincide with the single release. The video begins in black-and-white, with Armstrong waking up on a floor and remembering a night out at a bar and a Christmas party. However, towards the end of the video, it changes to full color and reveals that, in reality, the events of that night were much "uglier". According to Baxley, the video represents the "personal, honest side" of the band, and is the third video in a cycle where color was gradually introduced – the video for "The American Dream Is Killing Me" was entirely in black-and-white, while that of "Look Ma, No Brains!" was black-and-white with pink accents. The music video for "Dilemma" was nominated for Best Rock Video at the 2024 MTV Video Music Awards, losing to the music video for "Human" by Lenny Kravitz.

== Live performances ==
Green Day played the live debut of "Dilemma" during their performance as part of the 2024 edition of Dick Clark's New Year's Rockin' Eve. The band then performed an acoustic version of "Dilemma" on January 16, 2024, in a New York City subway station with Jimmy Fallon, as part of a segment for The Tonight Show Starring Jimmy Fallon; while the performance did not air, it was uploaded to the show's YouTube channel on January 18. The song was included in the setlist of their January 18, 2024, show at Irving Plaza, as part of the Small Stages Series by SiriusXM. On April 3, 2024, the band played the song at the Fillmore during a charity concert for the United Nations Right Here, Right Now Global Climate Alliance.

"Dilemma" is included in the setlist of the Saviors Tour, the ongoing concert tour in support of Saviors which began on May 30, 2024. On July 26, 2024, the band played "Dilemma" during their appearance on Good Morning America's televised "Summer Concert Series". The band also played the song during their appearance on the American Music Awards 50th Anniversary Special on October 6, 2024.

== Credits and personnel ==
Personnel taken from Saviors liner notes.

Green Day

- Billie Joe Armstrong – lead vocals, guitar
- Mike Dirnt – bass, backing vocals
- Tré Cool – drums, percussion

Additional personnel

- Rob Cavallo – producer
- Green Day – producers
- Chris Lord-Alge – mixing

== Charts ==
=== Weekly charts ===
Chart performance for "Dilemma"
Chart (2024)	Peak position
Canada Rock (Billboard)	1
Czech Republic Airplay (ČNS IFPI)	45
Germany Airplay (TopHit)	37
New Zealand Hot Singles (RMNZ)	25
US Hot Rock & Alternative Songs (Billboard)	32
US Rock & Alternative Airplay (Billboard)	1

=== Year-end charts ===
Year-end chart performance for "Dilemma"
Chart (2024)	Position
US Rock Airplay (Billboard)	3

Year-end chart performance for "Dilemma"
Chart (2025)	Position
Canada Mainstream Rock (Billboard)	57

== Release history ==
Release history for "Dilemma"
Region	Date	Format(s)	Label	Ref.
Various	December 7, 2023	Digital download; streaming	Reprise	
United States	January 23, 2024	Modern rock radio	Warner	
