= Africans in Hawaii =

Hawaii residents or citizens of African descent

Pōpolo
Total population
- 52,069 (4.0%, 2010) 29,307 (2.3%, African alone, 2010)

Regions with significant populations

Languages
- English, Portuguese, Spanish, French, Hawaiian (rarely)

Religion
- Christianity

Related ethnic groups
- Cape Verdean, African American, Afro-Caribbean, Afro-Asians

The Africans in Hawaiʻi, also known as Pōpolo in Hawaiian, constitute 4% of the islands' population, including those partially Black, and 2.3% of Hawaiʻi residents are of African American, Afro-Caribbean, or African immigrant descent alone. Hawaiʻi's Black population is mostly concentrated in the Greater Honolulu area, especially near military installations. There is also a sizable Cape Verdean American population, and there are some Hispanic people, namely Puerto Ricans.

== Etymology ==
"Pōpolo" (cognate to Māori: poroporo) means blackberry in Hawaiian referring to the black nightshade, it can also be used to describe a lobelia or a pokeberry. Pōpolo became used to describe the dark skin of African people from an analogy to the color of its berries.

== History ==
=== 19th century ===
The first Africans to visit Hawaiʻi were deckhands on merchant and whaling ships, and came from Cape Verde, the United States (African Americans), and the Caribbean (West Indians). Some of these early Africans, Caribbeans, and Black Americans ended their maritime careers and settled in Hawaiʻi. A number of them were successful musicians, business men, and respected royal government officials in the Kingdom of Hawaiʻi.

Throughout the 1800s, there were a few prominent Black Americans in Hawaiian society. One was Anthony D. Allen (1774–1835), an ex-slave. He came to Hawaiʻi in 1810 as a whaler and eventually became a steward of Kamehameha I. By 1820, Anthony owned twelve houses and a farm, and ran a local boarding house, bowling alley, and hospital. The first two leaders of the Royal Hawaiian Band under Kamehameha III: Oliver and George Washington Hyatt (1815–1870) were also African-Americans. A former slave who accompanied the American Protestant missionaries to Hawaiʻi, Betsey Stockton started the first mission school in Lāhainā open to the common people.

Prior to independence in 1975, many Cape Verdeans emigrated to Hawaiʻi from drought-stricken Portuguese Cape Verde, formerly an overseas province of Portugal. Because these people arrived using their Portuguese passports, they were registered as Portuguese immigrants by the authorities.

Following the Emancipation Proclamation in 1863, the Hawaiian government became interested in the prospect of contracting freed slaves for labor in Hawaiʻi. The thought of the four million slaves suddenly thrust onto the open market prompted Hawaiian Foreign Minister Robert Crichton Wyllie to write to a prominent friend in Boston, "We could perhaps admit with advantage to ourselves, say 20,000 freed Negroes, pay them the wages and give them the treatment of free men." Although nothing came out of it due to the inability of President Abraham Lincoln to enforce the law in the South.

=== 20th century ===
By 1910 there were still only 695 Africans in Hawaiʻi, of whom 537 were multiracial. Following the Overthrow of the Hawaiian Monarchy by White plantation elites, an unofficial race-class system was established with "Whites" at the top, "Browns" in the middle, and "Yellows" at the bottom. Fortunately for the Africans, their dark skin categorized them as "Brown" people, a category mostly comprising Hawaiians and other Polynesians. This allowed them to ascend to the working and middle classes. Since annexation, the immigration barriers were lifted and attempts were made to bring laborers of African descent from Tennessee, Mississippi, and Alabama to Hawaiʻi to work the sugarcane plantations. Since the logistics of getting Africans to Hawaiʻi proved too difficult to make them a practical source of labor, only 300 made the journey. Many did not stay on plantations after their contracts expired, finding Hawaiʻi's plantation life deplorable. Although they considered themselves better off returning to the plantations of the Southern United States, most could not afford the cost of leaving Hawaiʻi. Despite the horrid conditions at the bottom of society, most Africans were acquainted with the Western world either from life in the United States or in Colonial Africa. As Hawaiʻi was Americanized during the Territorial period, Africans could identify opportunities that went unnoticed by other groups not acquainted with the Western system. Many skilled African-Americans immigrated to escape the racism on the mainland and not be denied work in their trade or profession. Although racial hostilities existed with Whites, Whites were a minority. Alice A. Ball earned her master's degree at the University of Hawaiʻi and taught there as a chemistry instructor. She discovered the Ball's Method, a symptomatic treatment for leprosy that bears her namesake. One of the most iconic figures was Hawaiʻi-born Peter Hose (1881–1925) known as the "Hula Cop" joined the Honolulu Police Department becoming the first police officer of African ancestry in Hawaiʻi, where he served for 18 years.

=== World Wars ===
With the onset of World War I, 200 members of the 25th Infantry Regiment were stationed in Hawaiʻi to avert racial tensions, being that Hawaiʻi had a predominantly non-white population.

During World War II the military drew African-Americans to Hawaiʻi. 600 ship workers and thousands of soldiers arrived. The West Loch Disaster occurred on May 21, 1944, when the LST-353’s cargo of ammunition and fuel ignited, killing 163; several of the dead were African-Americans. Subsequent wars in Asia continued to bring African-Americans through Hawaiʻi. The result of military movement was that many returned to live in Hawaiʻi after leaving the service.

=== Post-War immigration ===
After World War II, many residents of color in Hawaiʻi were educated by the G.I. bill belligerent towards the racial stratification. Several African Americans including Frank M. Davis were able to relate to the plight of the Black race on the US continent and participated in the "Bloodless Revolution" that overthrew the rule of Hawaiʻi's White minority and the race-class structure of the Territory.

== Notable people ==
- Barack H. Obama, former U.S. President
