= Look Ma, No Brains! =

Single by Green Day

from the album Saviors
- A-side: "The American Dream Is Killing Me" (7" vinyl)
- Released: November 2, 2023
- Genre: Punk rock; pop-punk
- Length: 2:03
- Label: Reprise
- Composers: Billie Joe Armstrong; Mike Dirnt; Tré Cool
- Lyricist: Billie Joe Armstrong
- Producers: Rob Cavallo; Green Day

Green Day singles chronology
"The American Dream Is Killing Me" (2023)	"Look Ma, No Brains!" (2023)	"Dilemma" (2023)

Music video
- "Look Ma, No Brains" on YouTube

"Look Ma, No Brains!" is a song by American rock band Green Day, released as the second single of their fourteenth studio album, Saviors (2024). Written by the band and produced by Rob Cavallo, the lyrics take the perspective of a "hapless rube" who "spirals into chaos". The song was premiered on October 22, 2023, during the When We Were Young festival, and was released for digital download and streaming on November 2, 2023, alongside an accompanying music video. "Look Ma, No Brains!" received generally positive reviews from critics, who called the song a return to the band's roots but criticized its lyrics.

== Background and release ==
Saviors, the band's fourteenth studio album, was conceived when Billie Joe Armstrong reconnected with producer Rob Cavallo, who had previously worked with the band on their albums Dookie (1994) and American Idiot (2004). The band subsequently went to RAK Studios in London to make the album, after learning that Liam Gallagher had recorded his 2022 studio album, C'mon You Know, there. Armstrong recalled "Look Ma, No Brains!" being the third song written for Saviors, after the title track and "Goodnight Adeline".

"Look Ma, No Brains!" was first released on October 21, 2023, during the When We Were Young festival, on 7-inch vinyl as the B-side to "The American Dream Is Killing Me". Later that year, on November 2, 2023, the song officially became available for digital download and streaming as the second single from Saviors. An accompanying music video, directed by Brendan Walter and Ryan Baxley, was released on the same day on YouTube; primarily in black and white with flashes of pink, it features the band playing for a nurse and a "catatonic-looking patient".

== Composition and lyrics ==
"Look Ma, No Brains!" is a "fast-paced" and "angsty" punk rock and pop-punk song. The "chirpy" instrumentation consists of "pounding" drums and a "steady yet feverish" electric guitar which plays a "near-hardcore" riff, culminating in a "gorgeously melodic" chorus. The song has been stylistically compared to the Ramones and previous works by the band.

Lyrically, "Look Ma, No Brains!" takes the perspective of a "hapless rube who thinks only about what will happen in the next five minutes", while they "blindly accept their spiral into chaos". A.D. Amorosi of Variety suggested that the lyrics "poke fun at a system that awards gold stars to its least-deserving souls", while Kelly Scanlon of Far Out interpreted the song as being about "embracing uniqueness despite constantly being bombarded by society's ideals". Emma Swann of DIY noted how the song "appears to mock the 'slacker' aesthetic" which the band once epitomized, with the song containing references to "I'm With Stupid" t-shirts and the 1996 film Trainspotting.

== Critical reception ==
"Look Ma, No Brains!" received generally positive reviews from music critics, who praised the song as being a return to the band's roots. Luke Winstanley of Clash described the song as "completely unfiltered, classic Green Day", while Maria Sherman of AP called the song a "return to [the band's] jubilant absurdity". Alistair Lawrence of Louder also praised the song, saying it "delivers the breezy neurosis of their best material". Andrew Trendell of NME noted "Look Ma, No Brains!" could "arguably fit on any Green Day album", while the staff of Spin declared that the song was "right at home in the band's catalog".

Sydney Bucksbaum of Entertainment Weekly praised the lyrics of "Look Ma, No Brains!", writing that they contained the "angst that skyrocketed [the band] to fame in the early '90s". However, Helen Brown of The Independent questioned the song's "immature streak", calling the song's lyrics "weird" with respect to the band's age. Dana Poland of Slant similarly criticized the song's lyrics, saying they "toe the line between charmingly irreverent and cringe-worthy". Arrielle Gordon of Pitchfork singled out the lyrics "Slam-danced on my face again" and "Rude boy going comatose", denouncing them as "punk Mad Libs".

== Live performances ==
Green Day debuted "Look Ma, No Brains!" during their appearance at the When We Were Young festival on October 22, 2023. The band played the song on October 26, 2023, as part of their Amazon Music Live setlist. On January 16, 2024, the band performed an acoustic version of "Look Ma, No Brains!" in a New York City subway station with Jimmy Fallon as part of a segment for The Tonight Show Starring Jimmy Fallon; while the performance did not air, it was uploaded to the show's YouTube channel on January 18. The song was included in the setlist of their January 18, 2024, show at Irving Plaza, as part of the Small Stages Series by SiriusXM. On April 3, 2024, the band played the song at the Fillmore during a charity concert for the United Nations Right Here, Right Now Global Climate Alliance.

"Look Ma, No Brains!" is included in the setlist of The Saviors Tour, the ongoing concert tour in support of Saviors that began on May 30, 2024. On July 26, 2024, Green Day played a part of "Look Ma, No Brains!" as part of Good Morning America's televised "Summer Concert Series".

== Credits and personnel ==
Personnel taken from Saviors liner notes.

Green Day

- Billie Joe Armstrong – lead vocals, guitar
- Mike Dirnt – bass, backing vocals
- Tré Cool – drums, percussion

Additional personnel

- Rob Cavallo – producer
- Green Day – producers
- Chris Lord-Alge – mixing

== Charts ==
Chart performance for "Look Ma, No Brains!"
Chart (2024)	Peak position
Czech Republic Rock (IFPI)	15
Germany Airplay (TopHit)	69
New Zealand Hot Singles (RMNZ)	37
Poland Airplay (TopHit)	187
