= Rubber (disambiguation) =

Rubber or natural rubber is a latex material, mainly from the Para rubber tree.

Rubber may also refer to:

== In science and industry ==
- Synthetic rubber, general term for many types of man-made rubbers
- Latex, emulsions from various plants, and the major raw material in the production of natural rubber
- Elastomers, or elastic (rubbery) polymers, particularly man-made rubbers

== In arts and entertainment ==
- Rubber (1936 film), a Dutch film
- Rubber (1938 film), a German film directed by Eduard von Borsody
- Rubber (2010 film), a French film
- Rubber (Gilby Clarke album), 1998
- Rubber (novel), a 1990 Indian Tamil novel by Jeyamohan
- Rubber, a name adopted by the band Harem Scarem from 1999–2001
- Rubber (Harem Scarem album), 1999
- Rubbers, a 2014 Singaporean comedy film
- "Rubberz", a 2026 song by Fenix Flexin and Purps on the Beat

== In recreation and sports ==
- Table tennis rubber, rubber used on the racket of a table tennis racket
- Rubber, Rubber bridge or a two 100-point games in contract bridge
- In baseball, a slab from which the pitcher throws, or at times, the pitcher's mound itself
- In cricket, an individual game in a series of matches
- In tennis, an individual game in a series of matches

== Other uses ==
- Condom, in American slang
- Eraser, in British and Australian English
- Galoshes (rubber boots), in British English

== See also ==
- Rubber hose (disambiguation)
