= Rubber hose =

Rubber hose or Rubberhose may refer to:

- A hose, a flexible hollow tube
- Rubber hose animation, the first animation style that became standardized in the American animation industry
- Rubberhose (file system), a deniable encryption archive containing multiple file systems whose existence can only be verified using the appropriate cryptographic key
- Rubber-hose cryptanalysis, a euphemism for the extraction of cryptographic secrets from a person by coercion or torture

== See also ==
- Rubber (disambiguation)
- Hose (disambiguation)
