= Hose (band) =

American garage punk band

Hose is an "artcore" and garage punk band from the 1980s founded by producer and Def Jam creator Rick Rubin. Hose's 12-inch EP was the first recording released with the Def Jam logo.

== The Founding ==
Founded in 1981 by guitarist Rick Rubin, bassist Warren Bell, drummer Joel Horne, and lead singer Rick Rosen, this early "artcore" band was often touted as the East Coast's answer to Flipper. The band's slow-paced, blues-influenced sound was mostly designed and produced by Rubin, who embodied the best of the era's DIY attitude that continued on to his later career as a top record producer and rock tastemaker. The first recording was a 12-inch EP (or SLP for "short long play") produced in a dorm activity room with a basic "boombox" and a single microphone. The initial release featured a jacket with Rubin's interpretation of a Mondrian-inspired design that held to his production idea that bass and drums provided structure and guitars and vocals added color to a song. The record mixed originals with slowed-down covers of pop soul tunes like Hot Chocolate's "You Sexy Thing", and Rick James' "Superfreak". Early shows by Hose saw neophyte bassist Bell playing in a seated position, an Electrolux vacuum mic'ed offstage to add white noise, and singer Rosen aggressively entering the audience. Both the band and album received critical praise from reviewer Robert Christgau.

== Changes ==
The amicable departure of Rick Rosen brought dorm-friend Mike Espindle into the vocalist slot in 1982, and his larger-than-life stage presence and growling vocals infused Hose's live shows with a rowdier vibe. Autumn Goft replaced Joel Horne on drums; a skilled, practiced drummer, Goft brought a solid, slightly Bonham-like off-beat to the band's back end. During this period, Hose recorded a 7-inch single that became Def Jam's official first recording. On the vinyl: "Mobo," a cover of an obscure French disco song, "Girls," a 20-second hardcore thrash, and "Zoo," a dumbed-down version of the folk song "We're All Going to the Zoo Tomorrow." The single was, again, produced by Rubin (this time in a Long Island City studio) and was released with gouged etchings by Espindle in the center instead of a label and was shipped in a brown paper bag with stickers. NME ran a positive review of the single soon after its release. Bassists during this time shifted between Bell, dorm-friends Steve Williams and Tony Scheitinger, and a pick-up bassist for a San Francisco tour simply known as "Sweet." The band also played and toured heavily at this time, sharing the stage with the likes of Hüsker Dü, the Meat Puppets, the Butthole Surfers, the Circle Jerks, Red Kross, and MDC.

== End of days ==
The budding enterprise of Def Jam and the demands of the fledgling label slowly took Rubin away from performing music, although he did try to include Hose in the fabled deal Def Jam made with Columbia Records. Columbia passed on Hose, but picked up projects like the Beastie Boys and other rap-related acts. The band recorded its final songs, "Down by the River" and a cover of Led Zeppelin's "How Many More Times?" as part of Touch and Go Records' "God's Favorite Dog" compilation (which included bands like Happy Flowers, Big Black and the Butthole Surfers). The songs were recorded with Steve Ett, who would become Rubin's go-to-guy for producing, in what would later become Chung King House of Metal studios made famous by the Beastie Boys and other acts. Hose's last performance together was at Irving Plaza in 1986 with the Butthole Surfers with Rubin, Goft, Espindle and Williams.

== Members ==
=== Original ===
- Rick Rubin – guitar
- Warren Bell – bass
- Joel Horne – drums
- Rick Rosen – vocals

=== Additional ===
- Autumn Goft – drums
- Steve Williams – bass
- Tony Scheitinger – bass
- "Sweet" – bass
- Mike Espindle – vocals

== Discography ==
- 1982: Hose (EP)
- 1983: Mobo (single)
