= Crown Jewel (2025) =

WWE premium live event

- Promotional poster featuring various WWE wrestlers
- Promotion: WWE
- Brand(s): Raw; SmackDown
- Date: October 11, 2025
- City: Perth, Western Australia, Australia
- Venue: RAC Arena
- Attendance: 13,683

WWE event chronology
← Previous; NXT No Mercy	Next → NXT Halloween Havoc

WWE in Australia chronology
← Previous; Elimination Chamber	Next → Wrestlepalooza

Crown Jewel chronology
← Previous; 2024	Next → 2026

The 2025 Crown Jewel, also promoted as Crown Jewel: Perth, was a professional wrestling premium live event (PLE) produced by the American company WWE, held for wrestlers from the promotion's main roster brands, Raw and SmackDown. It was the seventh Crown Jewel and took place on Saturday, October 11, 2025, at the RAC Arena in Perth, Western Australia, Australia, airing live at 8:00 p.m. Australian Eastern Time (8:00 a.m. Eastern Time). The event was centered around the men's and women's Crown Jewel Championship matches, which featured the respective men's and women's world champions of Raw and SmackDown against each other to determine the better champions.

This was the first and only Crown Jewel held outside of Saudi Arabia, as all previous events were held in the country's capital of Riyadh, with Crown Jewel returning to the city in 2026. Like many of WWE's events, however, it was still sponsored by Saudi Arabia's General Entertainment Authority via Riyadh Season. This was the first Crown Jewel to broadcast on ESPN Unlimited in the United States and on Netflix in most international markets. This would also be the final Crown Jewel on the WWE Network in any country as the last few countries that were still on the service due to pre-existing contracts merged under Netflix on April 1, 2026. It was also the final Crown Jewel to air on Disney+ in the Philippines and Abema in Japan before they too merged under Netflix on January 1 and October 1, 2026, respectively. The event also featured John Cena's final PLE appearance in Australia and outside the United States as an in-ring performer due to his retirement from professional wrestling at the end of 2025.

Five matches were contested at the event. The main event was the 2025 Men's Crown Jewel Championship match, which was won by Raw's World Heavyweight Champion Seth Rollins, who defeated SmackDown's Undisputed WWE Champion Cody Rhodes. The 2025 Women's Crown Jewel Championship match saw Raw's Women's World Champion Stephanie Vaquer defeat SmackDown's WWE Women's Champion Tiffany Stratton. In the other matches on the card, John Cena defeated AJ Styles, who had announced his own retirement plans on the Crown Jewel: Perth Kickoff show the day before, Iyo Sky and Australia native Rhea Ripley defeated The Kabuki Warriors (Asuka and Kairi Sane) in a tag team match, and in the opening bout, Australia native Bronson Reed defeated Roman Reigns in an Australian Street Fight.

The event received generally positive reviews, with the Cena vs. Styles bout being universally acclaimed by fans and critics alike, while the main event and the tag team match were also praised.

== Production ==
=== Background ===
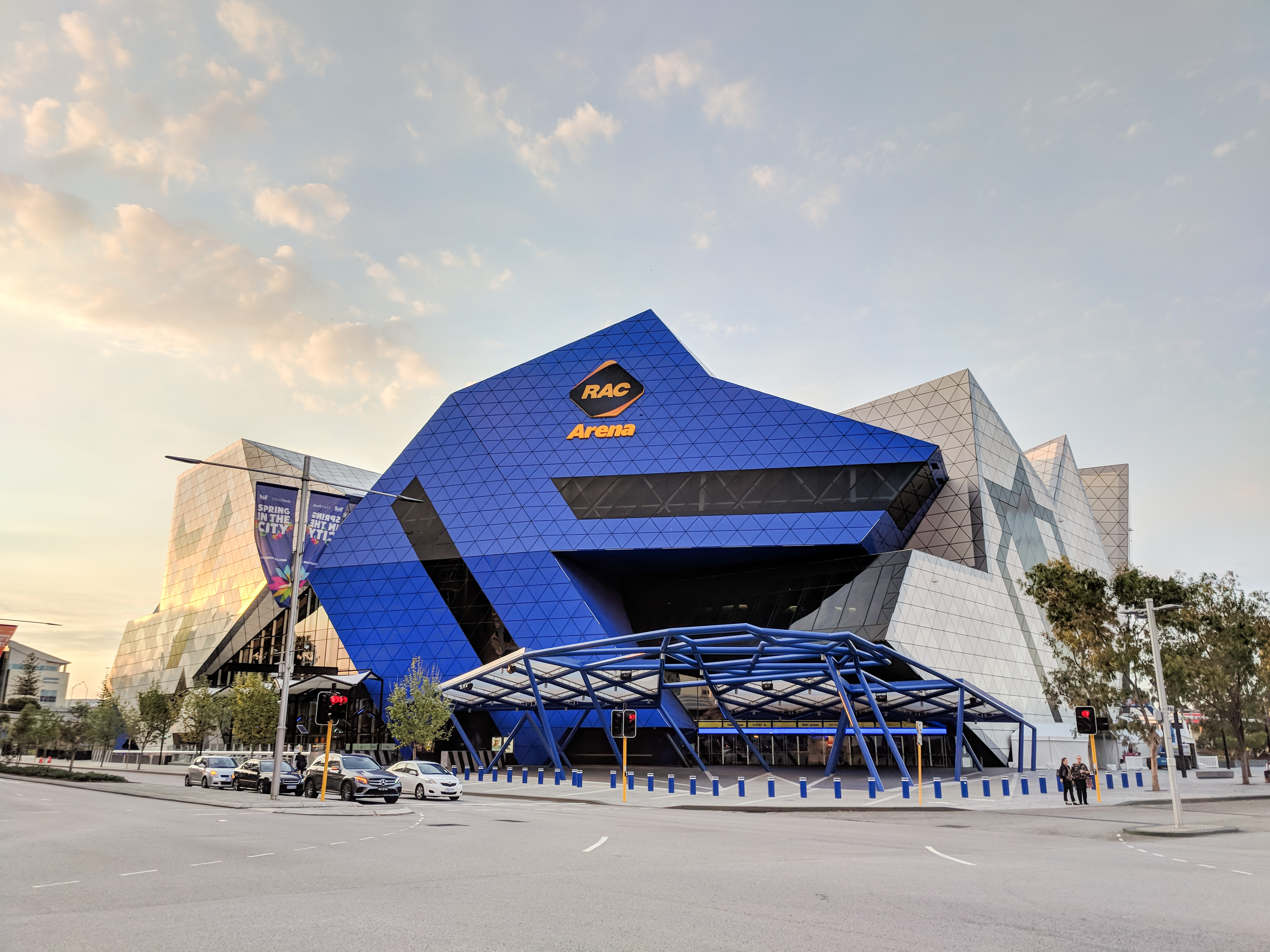
The seventh Crown Jewel was held at the RAC Arena in Perth, Western Australia, Australia, which was the first and only Crown Jewel held outside of Riyadh, Saudi Arabia.

Crown Jewel is a professional wrestling premium live event (PLE) produced by the American promotion WWE since 2018, typically held in late October–early November. It has been held every year since, except in 2020 due to the COVID-19 pandemic. Fom its inception, it was the main recurring event that took place in Riyadh, Saudi Arabia as part of a 10-year partnership with the country in support of Saudi Vision 2030, Saudi Arabia's social and economic reform program, and it was held as part of the annual Riyadh Season festivities, which began in 2019. Beginning with the 2024 event, Crown Jewel became centered around the men's and women's Crown Jewel Championship matches, held between the respective men's and women's world champions of WWE's Raw and SmackDown brand divisions to determine the better champions.

In February 2025, following the success of the 2024 Elimination Chamber, which was held in Perth, Western Australia, WWE announced that the company would be returning to Australia sometime in 2025 for a takeover weekend that would include a PLE and tapings of Monday Night Raw and Friday Night SmackDown. As a result of the Royal Rumble in January 2026 being scheduled for Saudi Arabia's 2025–2026 Riyadh Season, on May 2, 2025, the Australian PLE was announced as the seventh Crown Jewel, scheduled for Perth at the RAC Arena on Saturday, October 11, 2025, marking the first Crown Jewel to not be held in Saudi Arabia. The event was in turn promoted as Crown Jewel: Perth with SmackDown also confirmed for October 10 and Raw on October 13 at the same venue. The official theme song of the event was "One Eyed Bastard" by Green Day.

=== Broadcast outlets ===
The PLE was broadcast on traditional pay-per-view (PPV) outlets worldwide. It was also available to livestream on ESPN Unlimited in the United States, SuperSport in Sub-Saharan Africa, Disney+ in the Philippines, Abema in Japan, Netflix in most other international markets, and the WWE Network in a select few countries that had not yet transferred to Netflix due to pre-existing contracts. This marked the first Crown Jewel to livestream on Netflix following the WWE Network's merger under the service in January 2025 in those areas, and to livestream on ESPN's app in the United States, as WWE's contract with Peacock to air main roster PLEs expired at the conclusion of Clash in Paris in August. With the event being held in Australia, it aired live at 8:00 p.m. Australian Eastern Time (8:00 a.m. Eastern Time).

=== Storylines ===
The event included five matches that resulted from scripted storylines. Results were predetermined by WWE's writers on the Raw and SmackDown brands, while storylines were produced on WWE's weekly television shows, Monday Night Raw and Friday Night SmackDown.

At Wrestlepalooza, 2024 Men's Crown Jewel Champion Cody Rhodes retained SmackDown's Undisputed WWE Championship. During the post-event show, he was confronted by Raw's World Heavyweight Champion Seth Rollins. With neither having a scheduled title defense before Crown Jewel, this set up the 2025 Men's Crown Jewel Championship match, which WWE Chief Content Officer Paul "Triple H" Levesque subsequently confirmed. Also at Wrestlepalooza, Stephanie Vaquer won Raw's Women's World Championship, while on the September 26 episode of SmackDown, Tiffany Stratton retained SmackDown's WWE Women's Championship, thus confirming the 2025 Women's Crown Jewel Championship match.

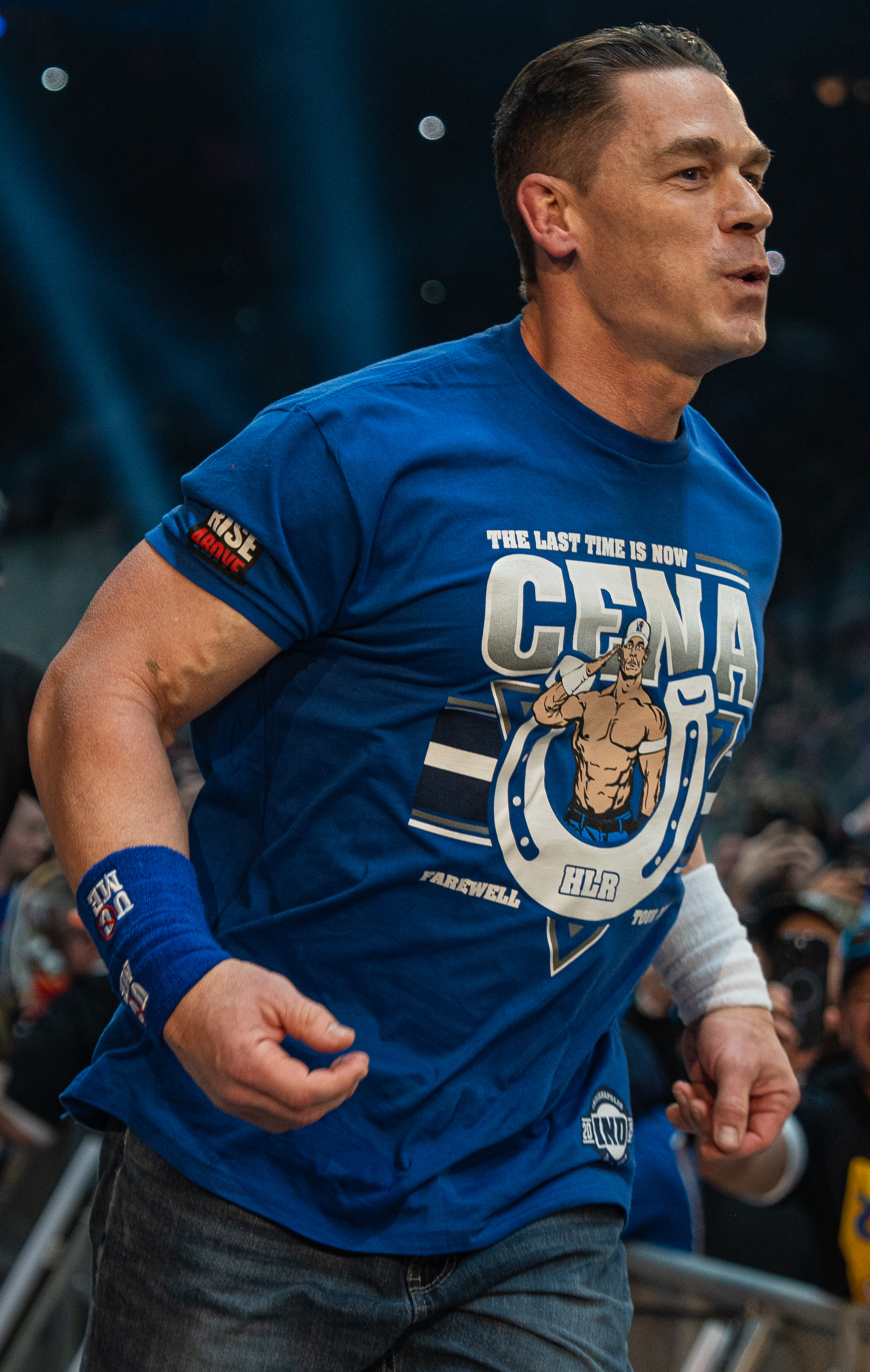
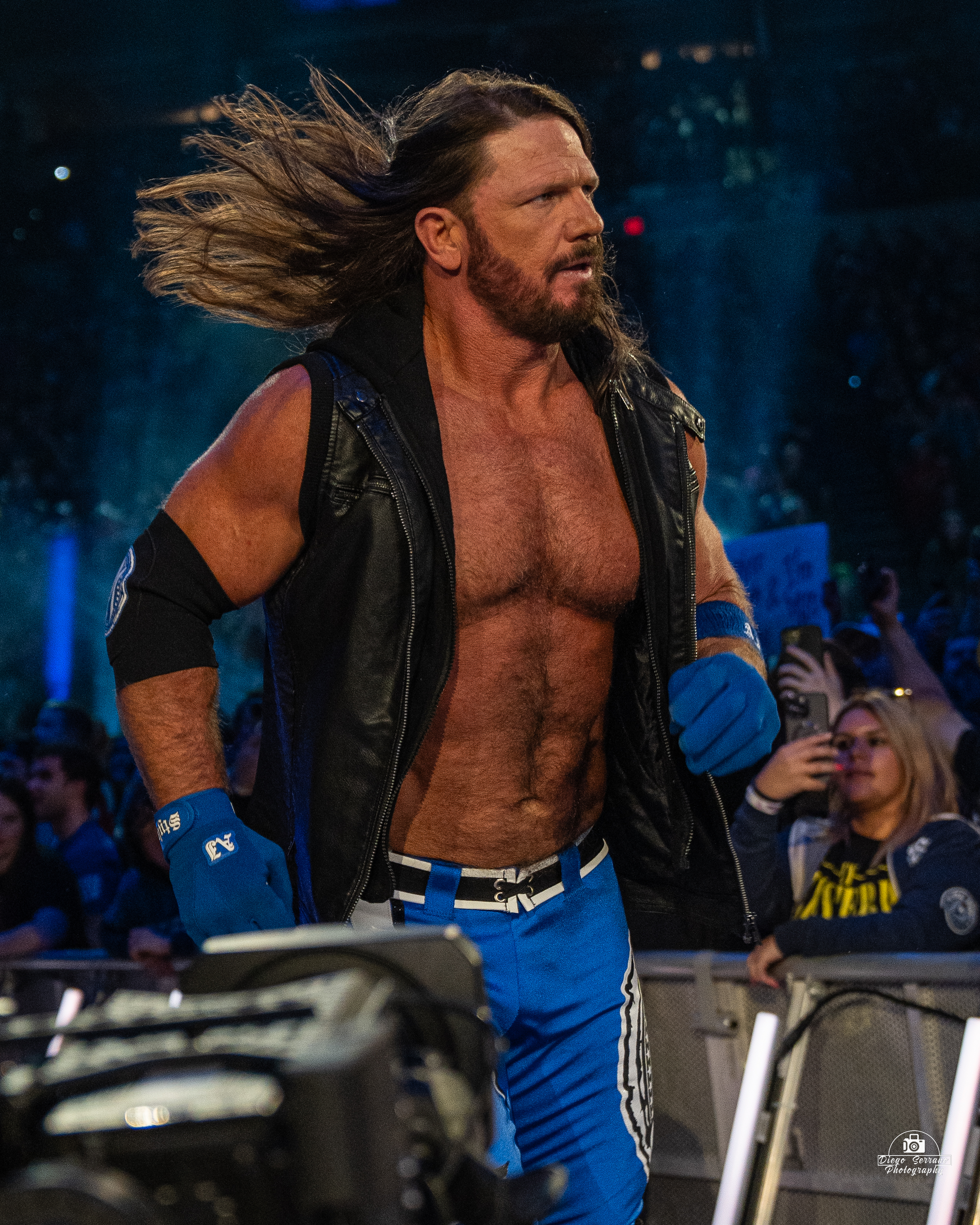
John Cena wrestled AJ Styles in their last match against each other.

In a promo prior to his match at Clash in Paris, John Cena listed wrestlers he wanted to face before his retirement from in-ring competition at the end of 2025, which included former rival AJ Styles. Following his loss at Wrestlepalooza, Cena posted on X about having a match against Styles, which Styles responded, saying he wanted the match as well. Triple H subsequently confirmed a match between them for Crown Jewel. According to Fightful Select, the match was built over social media because Cena had no scheduled TV dates before Crown Jewel.

At Night 2 of SummerSlam, Rhea Ripley and Iyo Sky competed for the Women's World Championship, though neither won. Afterwards, Ripley and Sky maintained a friendly relationship, much to the dismay of Sky's former Damage CTRL stablemates The Kabuki Warriors (Asuka and Kairi Sane), but more specifically Asuka, who confronted Sky multiple times, claiming that Sky should end her friendship with Ripley. At Wrestlepalooza, Sky was scheduled to face Stephanie Vaquer for the vacant title, where Asuka stated that she and Sane would help her win, but Sky declined their help; Sky subsequently lost the match. Two nights later on Raw, Asuka confronted Vaquer, stating that Sky should have won the title instead. Ripley then interrupted her, stating that she was tired of Asuka's behavior. This led to a match between Ripley and Asuka being scheduled for later that night, but before that, Sky asked Ripley to call off the match, which Ripley declined, and stated that Sky should be careful with Asuka, which infuriated Sky. Later, Ripley defeated Asuka. Following the match, Asuka spat mist on Ripley before Sky made the save. However, Asuka performed a spinning backfist on Sky, betraying her. After that, Asuka and a conflicted Sane attacked Sky and Ripley. On the following episode, Ripley called out The Kabuki Warriors, with Sky appearing instead. Sky then stated that Ripley was right about Asuka and Sane, but stated they were family and she still loved them. The Kabuki Warriors then appeared on the titantron, and Asuka said that she would forgive Sky if she apologized to her. Sky then left, only for The Kabuki Warriors to attack Ripley, prompting Sky to intervene. Asuka then spat mist on Sky before continuing the attack on Ripley. Later that night, Sane tried to convince Sky to apologize to Asuka, which Sky refused and told Sane to leave her alone. Sky subsequently revealed to Ripley that after speaking with Raw General Manager Adam Pearce, she and Ripley, in the latter's home country of Australia, would face The Kabuki Warriors in a tag team match at Crown Jewel.

Since early 2025, Roman Reigns was in a rivalry against longtime rival Seth Rollins, who subsequently allied with Paul Heyman at WrestleMania 41, with Heyman betraying Reigns. They subsequently would ally themselves with Bron Breakker and Bronson Reed, forming The Vision. At Night 1 of SummerSlam, Reigns and his cousin Jey Uso defeated Reed and Breakker in a tag team match, and a month later at Clash in Paris, Reigns defeated Reed. After the victory, Reigns applied a Guillotine choke to Heyman, but Breakker and Reed launched a brutal attack on Reigns, ultimately sending him out on a stretcher. Almost a month later on the September 29 episode of Raw, Reigns returned, helping The Usos (Jey and Jimmy Uso) defeat Breakker and Reed in a tornado tag team match. On the following episode, Reigns was interrupted by Reed and Heyman. Reigns then challenged Reed to fight him at that moment, but Heyman stopped Reed from doing so. Heyman then challenged Reigns to face Reed in an Australian Street Fight at Crown Jewel, in Reed's home country of Australia, which Reigns accepted.

== Event ==
Other on-screen personnel
Role:	Name:
English commentators	Michael Cole
English commentators	Wade Barrett
Spanish commentators	Marcelo Rodriguez
Spanish commentators	Jerry Soto
Ring announcer	Alicia Taylor
Referees	Shawn Bennett
Referees	Jessika Carr
Referees	Dan Engler
Referees	Eddie Orengo
Referees	Ryan Tran
Interviewer	Cathy Kelley
Pre-show panel	Michael Cole
Pre-show panel	Wade Barrett
Pre-show panel	Jackie Redmond
Pre-show panel	Big E
Pre-show panel	Peter Rosenberg

=== Preliminary matches ===
The PLE began with the Australian Street Fight between Roman Reigns and Australian-native Bronson Reed (accompanied by Paul Heyman). Reigns dominated Reed early on, using various weapons including rugby balls, a cricket bat and cricket balls and demanding the crowd to "acknowledge him" before introducing a table. Reed gained control by attacking Reigns with steel steps and a chair, landing several near-falls before missing multiple high-risk moves. Bron Breakker interfered, spearing Reigns and, alongside Reed, delivering a Shield-style powerbomb through the announce table. The Usos (Jimmy Uso and Jey Uso) then appeared to aid Reigns, attacking Breakker and Reed, but were eventually overpowered. A miscommunication led to Jey accidentally spearing Reigns through a table, allowing Reed to hit a Tsunami for the victory. After the match, Reigns reprimanded The Usos for interfering, stating he wanted to prove he could win without help, and told them he did not want to see them until Christmas. The segment ended with Jimmy and Jey arguing in the ring.

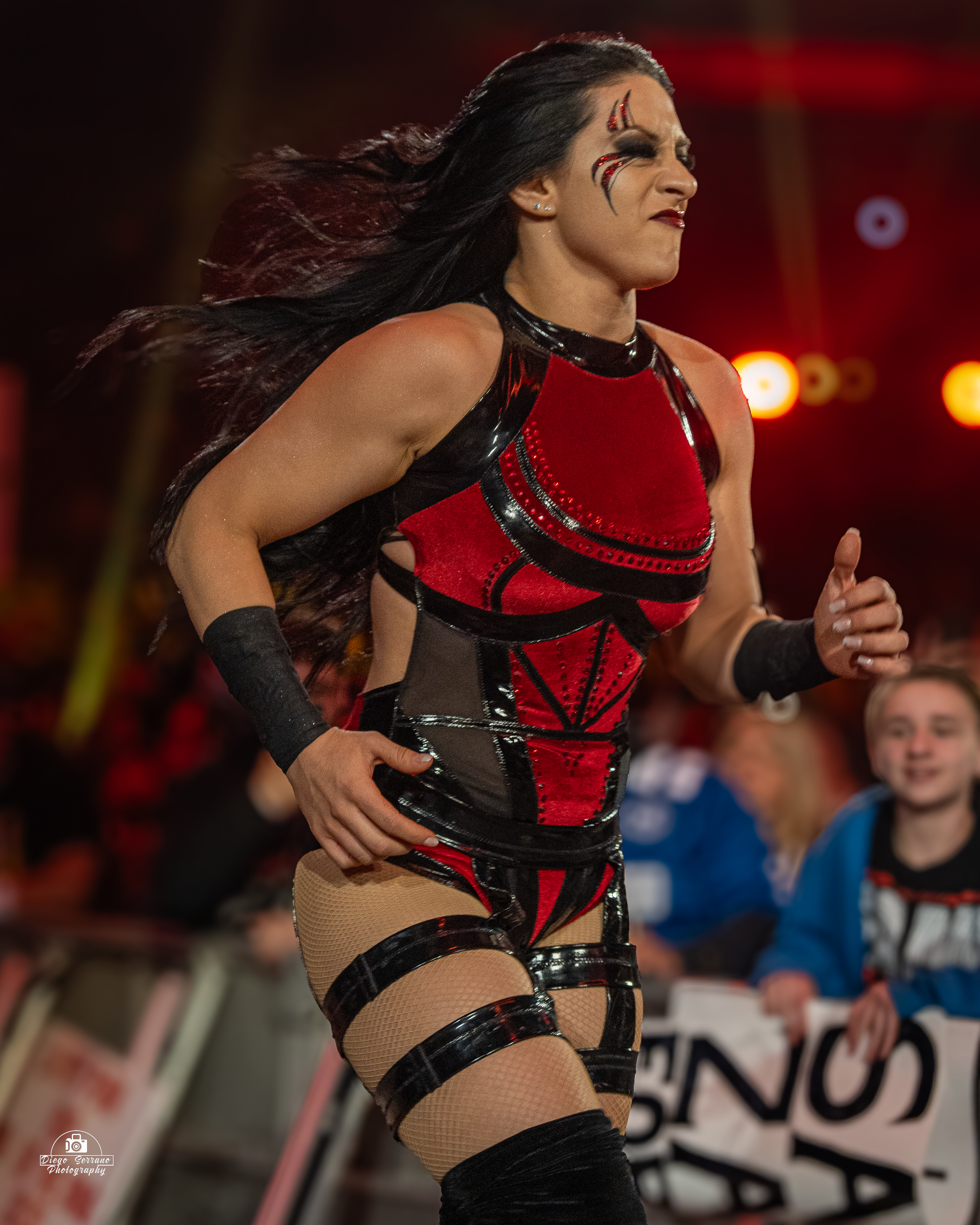
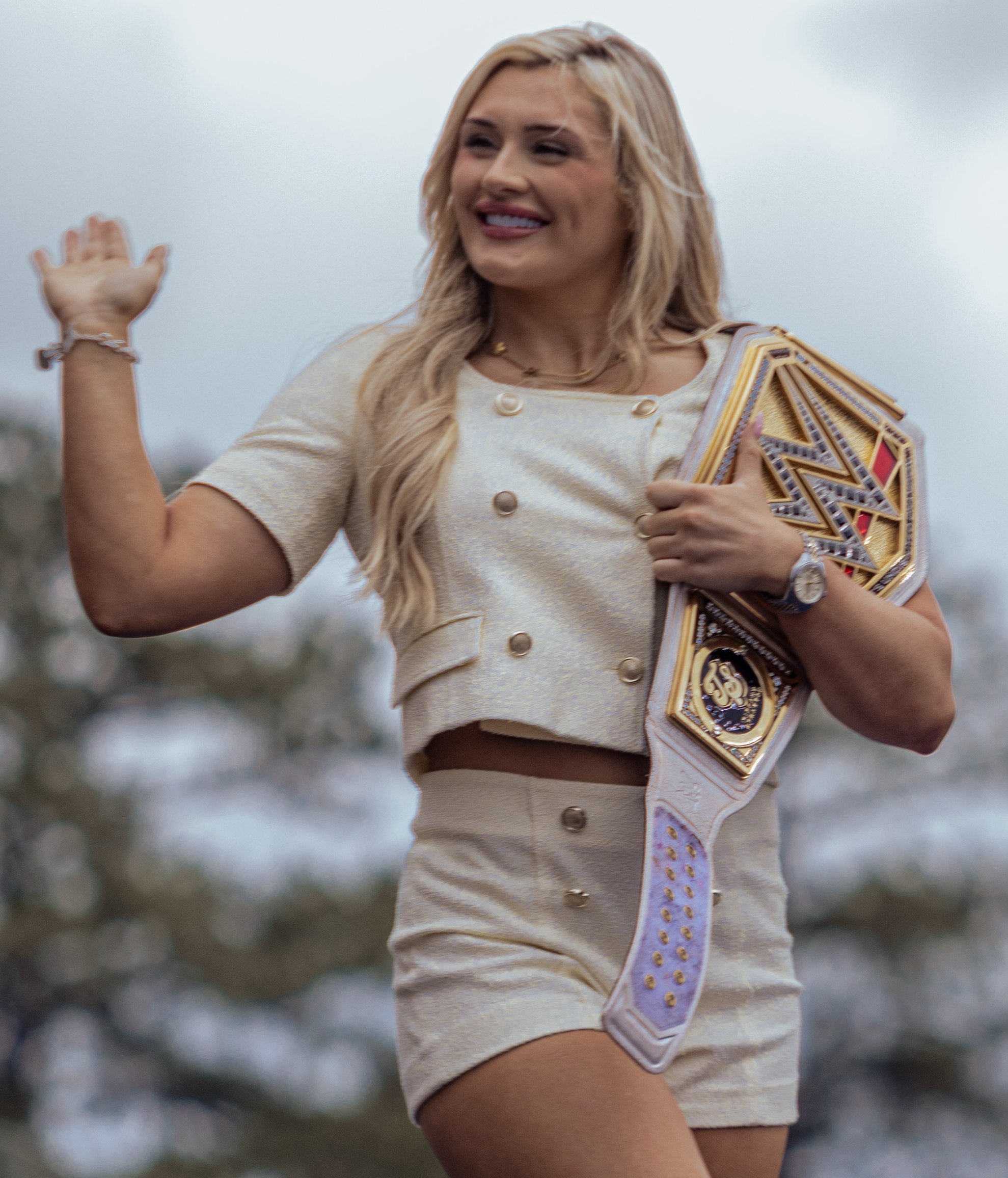
Raw's Women's World Champion Stephanie Vaquer defeated SmackDown's WWE Women's Champion Tiffany Stratton to win the 2025 WWE Women's Crown Jewel Championship.

Next was the 2025 Women's Crown Jewel Championship match between Raw's Women's World Champion Stephanie Vaquer and SmackDown's WWE Women's Champion Tiffany Stratton. They exchanged offense early on, with Vaquer largely controlling the pace and using aggressive tactics. Stratton gained momentum with a handspring elbow and an Alabama slam, while Vaquer responded with a dragon screw and a corner meteora. After a series of near-falls, Stratton missed a Prettiest Moonsault Ever, allowing Vaquer to capitalize with a spiral tap to secure the pinfall victory and become the second winner of the Women's Crown Jewel Championship. Triple H presented the Women's Crown Jewel ring and championship belt to Vaquer.

After that, John Cena took on AJ Styles. Styles came out wearing blue and white trunks similar to the ones he wore on Total Nonstop Action Wrestling's (TNA) first episode of Impact! on Spike TV that aired on October 1, 2005, nearly 20 years prior. During the introductions, Cena handed a note to Alicia Taylor for her to read as the introduction for Styles, which included references to TNA and the Bullet Club when Styles was in New Japan Pro-Wrestling. Cena gained the early advantage with his trademark offense and an Attitude Adjustment, while Styles countered with moves such as the Ushigoroshi and the rack bomb. Both men traded numerous homages, including Cena using The Miz's Skull Crushing Finale, Rusev's Accolade, Chris Jericho's Wall of Jericho, Bray Wyatt's Sister Abigail, Kane's Chokeslam and Randy Orton's hanging middle rope DDT and RKO, while Styles executed Christopher Daniels' Angel's Wings, Frankie Kazarian's Fade to Black, Samoa Joe's Coquina Clutch, Sting's Scorpion Death Drop, and Shawn Michaels' Sweet Chin Music. In the end, Cena countered a high crossbody into The Undertaker's Tombstone Piledriver followed by an Attitude Adjustment to score the pinfall victory and the 100th and final victory at a PLE of his career. After the match, Cena and Styles embraced and raised each other's hands as a show of mutual respect.

In the penultimate match, Australian-native Rhea Ripley and Iyo Sky took on The Kabuki Warriors (Asuka and Kairi Sane) in a tag team match. The match began with Asuka and Sane attacking their opponents before the bell, isolating Sky early on and preventing Ripley from tagging in. Sky eventually fought back and made the hot tag to Ripley, who shifted the momentum with a series of power moves. In the closing sequence, Ripley hit Sane with a Riptide, allowing Sky to follow with an Over the Moonsault to successfully pin Sane to claim the victory.

=== Main event ===
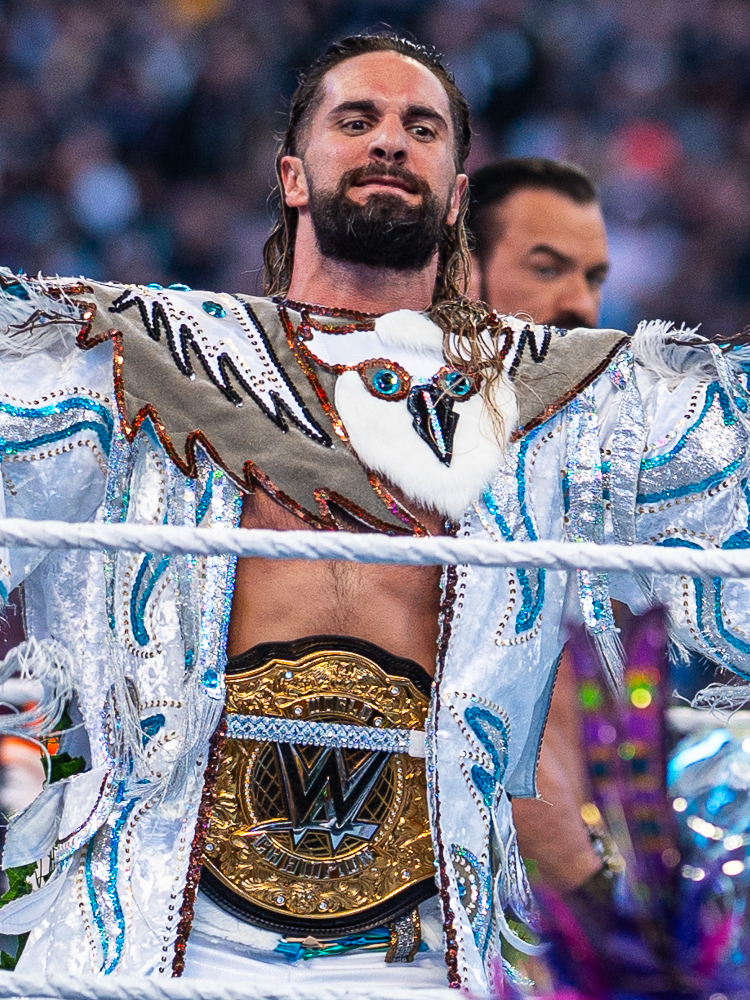
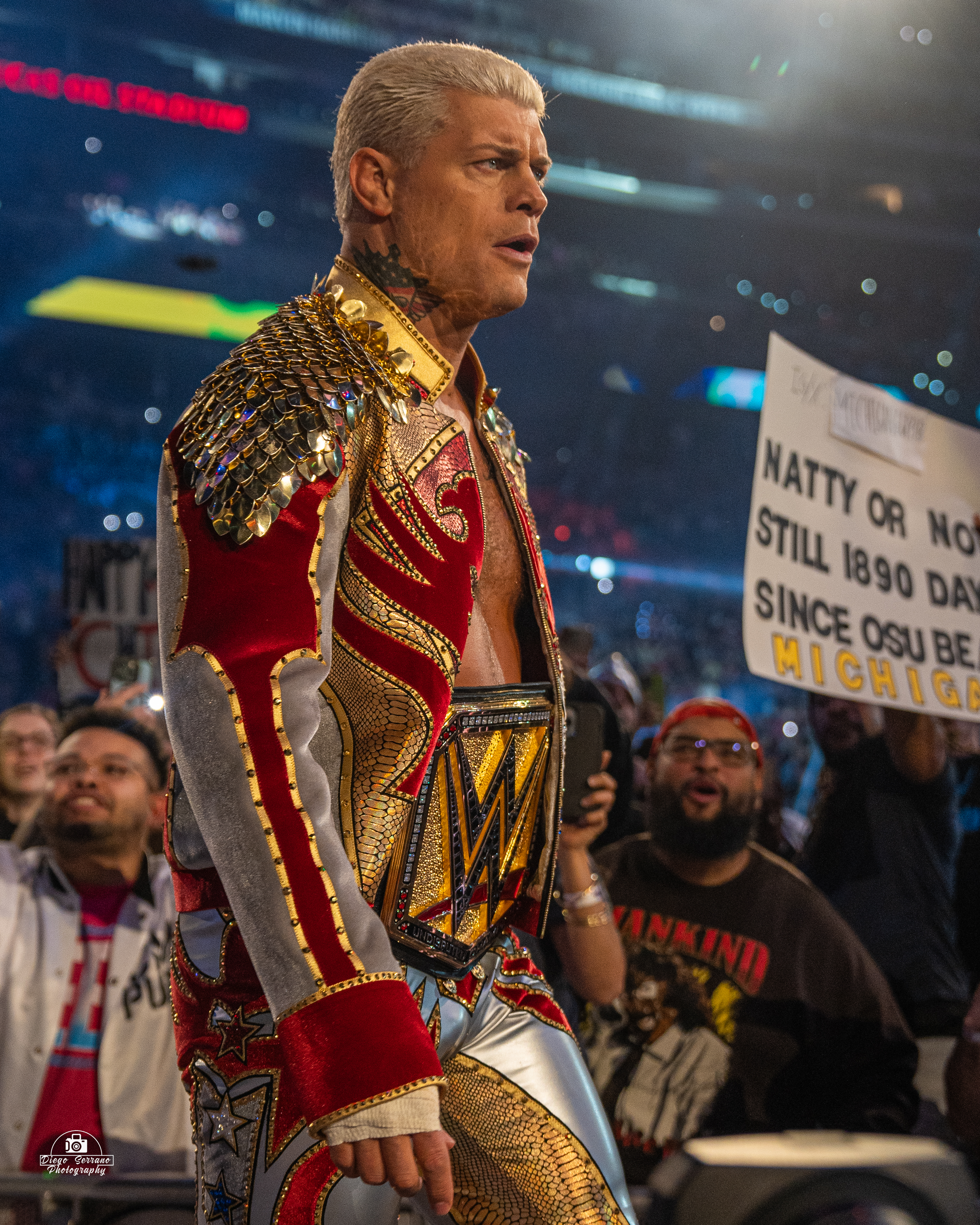
Raw's World Heavyweight Champion Seth Rollins defeated SmackDown's Undisputed WWE Champion Cody Rhodes in the main event to win the 2025 men's WWE Crown Jewel Championship.

The main event was the 2025 Men's Crown Jewel Championship match between Raw's World Heavyweight Champion Seth Rollins and SmackDown's Undisputed WWE Champion Cody Rhodes. Rollins entered the match wearing the wristwatch Rhodes had previously gifted him, symbolically removing it before the bout began. Rhodes gained early momentum, and Rollins became increasingly frustrated with the crowd's hostile chants, calling him a "wanker". Rollins targeted Rhodes's shoulder and mocked the mannerisms of both Dusty Rhodes and Stardust. Both men exchanged signature moves and near-falls, including Rhodes hitting a Vertebreaker and an avalanche Cross Rhodes, while Rollins countered with a Pedigree, a Cross Rhodes of his own, a curb stomp, and a coast-to-coast flying headbutt. Late in the match, Rollins retrieved the watch, wrapped it around his fist, and used it to strike Rhodes after a referee distraction. He followed with a curb stomp and another curb stomp but from the middle rope to secure the pinfall victory.

After the match, Triple H presented Rollins with the Crown Jewel ring and championship belt. Rollins cut a celebratory promo declaring himself the greatest of all time before posing with Women's Crown Jewel Champion Stephanie Vaquer, who Rollins warned that his wife, Becky Lynch, was coming for her title.

== Reception ==
The event received generally positive reviews from critics, with the Cena-Styles bout being universally acclaimed. ESPN writer Andreas Hale rated the event a B, stating that the show "stumbled out of the gate with a relatively tame street fight and a far too brief fight between women's champions" and that it was "rescued by an absolutely stellar match between Cena and Styles that put an excellent bookend to their rivalry". He called the event "a memorable bounce-back for WWE after a middling Wrestlepalooza", which had received a negative reception and a C rating from Hale.

Wrestling Observer Newsletter's Dave Meltzer rated the men's and women's Crown Jewel Championship matches 3.75 and 3.25 stars respectively, the tag team match 4.25 stars, the Australian Street Fight 3.5 stars, and the Cena vs. Styles match 4.75 stars (the highest rating of the night).

== Aftermath ==
This would be the only Crown Jewel to be held outside of Saudi Arabia, as the following year's event returned to Riyadh.

=== Raw ===
World Heavyweight Champion and 2025 men's Crown Jewel Championship winner Seth Rollins, along with his stable, The Vision (Bron Breakker, Bronson Reed, and Paul Heyman), opened the subsequent episode of Raw, with Rollins talking about his victory at Crown Jewel without assistance from The Vision. Later in the show, Reed defeated Jimmy Uso. Following the main event, Breakker, Reed, and Heyman turned on Rollins and kicked him out of the group. The following week, Rollins was stripped of the World Heavyweight Championship after (in kayfabe) being injured by the attack from Breakker and Reed. This was done to write Rollins off due to a legitimate shoulder injury he sustained during his men's Crown Jewel Championship match with Cody Rhodes, with a new World Heavyweight Champion crowned at Saturday Night's Main Event XLI, which was won by CM Punk.

Rhea Ripley, accompanied by Iyo Sky, defeated Kairi Sane, accompanied by Asuka, only for both Ripley and Sky to be attacked post-match by Asuka and Sane. Women's World Champion and 2025 Women's Crown Jewel Champion Stephanie Vaquer talked about her victory at Crown Jewel, before being interrupted by Roxanne Perez.

=== SmackDown ===
Undisputed WWE Champion Cody Rhodes talked about his loss at Crown Jewel, and referenced a match between Drew McIntyre and Jacob Fatu to determine the #1 contender for the Undisputed WWE Championship. The match would never happen, as before the bout was to occur, Fatu was found laid out unconscious. This led to an impromptu title match between Rhodes and McIntyre, where McIntyre defeated Rhodes by disqualification; since championships can't change hands by disqualification or countout unless stipulated, Rhodes retained the title. A championship rematch between Rhodes and McIntyre was later scheduled for Saturday Night's Main Event XLI. An additional stipulation was added to the match where if Rhodes was counted out or disqualified, he would lose the title.

=== Broadcasting changes ===
In continuing WWE's near worldwide transition to Netflix, this would be the final Crown Jewel to air on Disney+ in the Philippines and Abema in Japan before moving to Netflix on January 1 and October 1, 2026, respectively. Throughout 2025, many of the select few countries that were still on the WWE Network due to pre-existing contracts gradually merged to Netflix with nearly all international markets on Netflix by January 1, 2026. The last few remaining countries that were still on the WWE Network merged under Netflix on April 1, 2026, making this 2025 event the last Crown Jewel to air on the WWE Network in any country.

== Results ==
No.	Results	Stipulations	Times
1	Bronson Reed (with Paul Heyman) defeated Roman Reigns by pinfall	Australian Street Fight	21:00
2	Stephanie Vaquer (Raw's Women's World Champion) defeated Tiffany Stratton (SmackDown's WWE Women's Champion) by pinfall	Singles match for the 2025 WWE Women's Crown Jewel Championship	10:05
3	John Cena defeated AJ Styles by pinfall	Singles match	27:10
4	Iyo Sky and Rhea Ripley defeated The Kabuki Warriors (Asuka and Kairi Sane) by pinfall	Tag team match	19:55
5	Seth Rollins (Raw's World Heavyweight Champion) defeated Cody Rhodes (SmackDown's Undisputed WWE Champion) by pinfall	Singles match for the 2025 WWE Crown Jewel Championship	29:40
