= Hoser (disambiguation) =

Hoser is a derogatory slang term originating from Canada and used primarily by those imitating Canadians.

Hoser may also refer to:

== People ==
- Henryk Hoser, bishop of the Roman Catholic Diocese of Warszawa-Praga
- Raymond Hoser, Australian herpetologist and snake catcher

== Media ==
- Hoser, an album by Seaway (2013)
