= One Eyed Bastard =

Single by Green Day

from the album Saviors
- Released: January 5, 2024
- Recorded: 2023
- Genre: Punk rock, pop-punk
- Length: 2:52
- Label: Reprise
- Songwriters: Billie Joe Armstrong; Mike Dirnt; Tré Cool
- Producers: Rob Cavallo; Green Day

Green Day singles chronology
"Dilemma" (2023)	"One Eyed Bastard" (2024)	"Bobby Sox" (2024)

Music video
- "One Eyed Bastard" on YouTube

"One Eyed Bastard" is a song by the American rock band Green Day, from the band's fourteenth studio album, Saviors (2024). It was released on January 5, 2024, as the album's fourth single, via a music video animated by Rob Fidel. An official music video was released on May 23, 2025.

== Personnel ==
Personnel taken from Saviors liner notes.

Green Day

- Billie Joe Armstrong – lead vocals, guitar
- Mike Dirnt – bass, backing vocals
- Tré Cool – drums, percussion

Production

- Rob Cavallo – producer
- Green Day – producers
- Chris Lord-Alge – mixing

== Charts ==
=== Weekly charts ===
Weekly chart performance for "One Eyed Bastard"
Chart (2024–25)	Peak position
Canada Rock (Billboard)	1
Canada Modern Rock (Billboard)	20
Germany Airplay (TopHit)	72
Japan Hot Overseas (Billboard)	20
Netherlands Airplay (MegaCharts)	41
New Zealand Hot Singles (RMNZ)	22
UK Singles Downloads (OCC)	92
UK Rock & Metal (OCC)	27
US Rock & Alternative Airplay (Billboard)	2

=== Year-end charts ===
Year-end chart performance for "One Eyed Bastard"
Chart (2025)	Position
Canada Mainstream Rock (Billboard)	5
Canada Modern Rock (Billboard)	61
US Rock & Alternative Airplay (Billboard)	11

== Usage in media ==
"One Eyed Bastard" is on the soundtrack of NHL 25 and was also the theme song for WWE Crown Jewel 2025.
