= The American Dream Is Killing Me =

2023 single by Green Day

Single by Green Day

from the album Saviors
- B-side: "Look Ma, No Brains!" (7" vinyl)
- Released: October 24, 2023
- Genre: Pop-punk
- Length: 3:06
- Label: Reprise
- Composers: Billie Joe Armstrong; Mike Dirnt; Tré Cool
- Lyricist: Billie Joe Armstrong
- Producers: Rob Cavallo; Green Day

Green Day singles chronology
"Holy Toledo!" (2021)	"The American Dream Is Killing Me" (2023)	"Look Ma, No Brains!" (2023)

Music video
- "The American Dream Is Killing Me" on YouTube

"The American Dream Is Killing Me" is a song by American rock band Green Day from their fourteenth studio album, Saviors (2024). The opening track of the album, the song was originally written by the band during the sessions of their previous studio album as a protest song against the first presidency of Donald Trump. The song was later recorded with encouragement from producer Rob Cavallo, with lyrics tweaked to reflect the "anxiety of being an American".

After three weeks of the band posting zombie-themed teasers to their social media, the song was premiered on October 19, 2023, during a secret show in Las Vegas, and released for digital download and streaming on October 24 as the album's first single. The accompanying music video for the song, directed by Brendan Walter and Ryan Baxley, features the band playing to a crowd of zombies amidst a zombie apocalypse. "The American Dream Is Killing Me" received generally positive reviews from music critics, who praised its catchiness but criticized its "vague" lyrics. The song topped the US Rock Airplay and Canada Rock charts, and was nominated for Best Rock Performance at the 67th Annual Grammy Awards.

== Background and recording ==
"The American Dream Is Killing Me" was initially written during the sessions for Father of All Motherfuckers (2020), Green Day's thirteenth studio album. However, the song was ultimately shelved, as the band deemed the song as "low-hanging fruit" for the "terrible politics and terrible division" within the United States, and wished to avoid political themes on the album altogether.

Saviors, the band's fourteenth studio album, was later conceived when Billie Joe Armstrong reconnected with producer Rob Cavallo, who had previously worked with the band on their albums Dookie (1994) and American Idiot (2004). Towards the end of the recording process for Saviors, the band showed Cavallo "The American Dream Is Killing Me" when he asked whether the band had any other material. Upon receiving Cavallo's approval, Armstrong did a "deep dive on the lyrics" and "tweaked a few things here and there" with the song. "The American Dream Is Killing Me" was one of the final tracks recorded for Saviors.

== Composition and lyrics ==
"The American Dream Is Killing Me" is an "anthemic" pop-punk song, which has been stylistically compared to the band's 2004 studio album, American Idiot and their 2009 album 21st Century Breakdown. Brady Gerber of Vulture called the song "Clash-worthy", while Marko Djurdjić of Exclaim! stylistically compared the song to those by Thin Lizzy. "The American Dream Is Killing Me" begins with a "jig-like electric guitar riff", before the rest of the band joins in and the song takes on a "classic bouncy Green Day beat". The chorus of the song features a "big shout-along" of the song's title. The song's bridge contains a "string-infused" chamber pop interlude reminiscent of the Beatles, where Armstrong sings "People on the street / Unemployed and obsolete / Did you ever learn to read the ransom note?" before the song returns to its original style.

According to Armstrong, the lyrics of "The American Dream Is Killing Me" touch on political polarization and homelessness in the United States, the role of "the algorithm", disillusionment with the American Dream, and the "anxiety of being an American". Dirnt clarified that the song was originally written in protest to the presidency of Donald Trump; however, he added that the song is "a wider statement than Trump" and that it reflects Armstrong's upbringing. The New York Times' Jon Pareles further noted that the song's lyrics "deride" conspiracy theories, opponents to immigration, and the exploitation of real estate, while The Guardian's Phil Mongredien observed a sense of "weary resignation" in the song's lyrics. The song's lyrics have been compared to those of the band's prior protest song "American Idiot".

== Promotion and release ==
On October 1, 2023, the band released a 33-second video to their social media pages in reference to their 2005 single "Wake Me Up When September Ends", containing a calendar with the date October 24 circled. The band simultaneously released the teaser on a new website titled "The American Dream Is Killing Me", which allowed users to "register for a wake-up call" and receive email updates regarding Saviors. The band continued promoting the single release on their social media by posting various "eerie, zombie-filled clips" throughout the month. The song was first released on October 21 and 22 during the When We Were Young festival, on 7-inch vinyl featuring "Look Ma, No Brains!" on the B-side. On October 24, 2023, "The American Dream Is Killing Me" was made available for digital download and streaming, released as the first single off Saviors.

=== Music video ===
An accompanying music video for "The American Dream Is Killing Me", directed by Brendan Walter and Ryan Baxley, was uploaded to Green Day's YouTube channel on October 24, 2023. The music video features the zombified band playing the song to a "crowd of punk rock zombies" amidst a zombie apocalypse; towards the end, a group of zombie hunters begin to fight against the crowd. The black-and-white music video was recorded in Los Angeles. Inspired by film noir and Night of the Living Dead, it was intended to serve as both entertainment and social commentary for life in the United States.

== Critical reception ==
"The American Dream Is Killing Me"
An 18-second sample of "The American Dream Is Killing Me". The "string-infused" bridge of the song, which has been stylistically compared to the Beatles, received praise from critics.

"The American Dream Is Killing Me" received generally positive reviews from music critics, with Tom Breihan of Stereogum declaring it the "best new Green Day single in many years" upon its release. The song's composition has been praised for its energy and catchiness. A.D. Amorosi of Variety called the song a "spunky gallop", praising the song's bridge as "sweet" and "swiftly rendered". Marko Djurdjić of Exclaim! similarly highlighted the song's bridge, calling it an earworm. Ludovic Hunter-Tilney of the Financial Times called the song a "spry return to the power-trio days of American Idiot", while Helen Brown of The Independent observed that "the energy of a trio who met in their mid-teens seems undimmed now they're in their fifties". However, Brown criticized how "relentless" noises in the song "sludges out the sound too thickly", while Mark Richardson of The Wall Street Journal noted how the chorus "walks the line between catchy and irritating".

The lyrics of "The American Dream Is Killing Me" received mixed reviews. Emma Swann of DIY noted how the song epitomized Armstrong's "unrivaled" ability to "incorporate biting social commentary within perfect, three-minute pop (punk) songs", while Madison Walters of New Noise Magazine praised the song's "visceral" lyrics. Richardson observed how, despite the song not having "particularly insightful lyrics", it was "probably not meant to be" in lieu of being cathartic. Despite complimenting the song as an "effective opening" to the album, Chris Conaton of PopMatters called the song's lyrics "vague", suggesting that they seemed "specifically designed not to alienate" listeners. Luke Winstanley of Clash similarly deemed the song a "confident statement of intent", but noted it "lack[ed] real acidic bite". In more critical reviews, Arielle Gordon of Pitchfork lambasted the song's lyrics as "quaint and overly broad", while Andrew Sacher of BrooklynVegan found the track's "political sloganeering" to be "surface-level". Lauren Murphy of The Irish Times similarly criticized the song's reliance on "recycled tropes".

=== Accolades ===
Nominations for "The American Dream is Killing Me"
Award	Category	Result	Ref.
2025 Grammy Awards	Best Rock Performance	Nominated	

== Commercial performance ==
In its first week, "The American Dream Is Killing Me" garnered 1.1 million streams in the United States and sold 1,000 downloads. The song peaked at number one of Billboard's Rock Airplay chart on November 18, 2023, becoming the seventh song by the band to do so. The song also debuted and peaked at number 22 on the Hot Rock & Alternative Songs chart. Outside the United States, the song topped the Canada Rock chart and peaked at number 11 on the Japan Hot Overseas chart. The song also appeared on New Zealand's Hot Singles chart (29), the United Kingdom's Rock & Metal Singles chart (37), Germany's Download chart for singles (45), and the Finland's Radiosoittolista chart (81).

== Live performances ==
Green Day debuted "The American Dream Is Killing Me" during a surprise show at the Fremont Country Club in Las Vegas on October 19, 2023. The band then played the song during their appearance at the When We Were Young festival on October 21 and 22. On October 26, 2023, the band played "The American Dream Is Killing Me" as part of their Amazon Music Live setlist. The band played the song during their halftime show performance in the 110th Grey Cup on November 19, 2023. The band included "The American Dream Is Killing Me" in the setlist of their January 18, 2024 show at Irving Plaza as part of the Small Stages Series by SiriusXM. On April 3, 2024, the band played the song at the Fillmore during a charity concert for the United Nations Right Here, Right Now Global Climate Alliance. "The American Dream Is Killing Me" is included in the setlist of The Saviors Tour, the ongoing concert tour in support of Saviors that began on May 30, 2024.

== Credits and personnel ==
Personnel taken from Saviors liner notes.

Green Day

- Billie Joe Armstrong – lead vocals, guitar
- Mike Dirnt – bass, backing vocals
- Tré Cool – drums, percussion

Additional personnel

- Rob Cavallo – producer, string and horn arrangements
- Green Day – producers
- David Campbell – string and horn arrangements, conducting
- Chris Lord-Alge – mixing

== Charts ==
=== Weekly charts ===
Weekly chart performance for "The American Dream Is Killing Me"
Chart (2023–24)	Peak position
Canada Rock (Billboard)	1
Finland Airplay (Radiosoittolista)	81
German Download Singles (Official German Charts)	45
Japan Hot Overseas (Billboard)	11
New Zealand Hot Singles (RMNZ)	29
UK Singles Downloads (OCC)	65
UK Singles Sales (OCC)	73
UK Rock & Metal (OCC)	37
US Hot Rock & Alternative Songs (Billboard)	22
US Rock & Alternative Airplay (Billboard)	1

=== Year-end charts ===
Year-end chart performance for "The American Dream Is Killing Me"
Chart (2024)	Position
US Rock Airplay (Billboard)	5

== Release history ==
Release history for "The American Dream Is Killing Me"
Region	Date	Format(s)	Label	Ref.
Various	October 24, 2023	Digital download; streaming	Reprise	
Italy	October 24, 2023	Radio airplay	Warner	
United States	October 24, 2023	Modern rock radio	Warner	
