= Edgar Hose =

English field hockey player

Edgar Geoffrey Stanley Hose (22 Jul 1867 – 21 Oct 1943) was an English international hockey player.

== Early life ==
Edgar Hose was born in Camberwell, then in Surrey, the second son of John and Maria Henley Robinson. His mother died before he was ten years old, and his widowed father married for a second time, to Jemima Closs Fieldwick. From this second marriage, Edgar gained two younger brothers, Henry Fieldwick Hose and Arthur Steains Hose He had a younger sister, Mary, (born in 1870). Edgar's father, throughout this period, was involved in the manufacture of linen. Hose was educated at Dulwich College.

== Hockey ==
As a hockey player he played at outside-right and represented Bromley, Kent, South of England, and England In 1897, Hose made his first appearance for the England national field hockey team against Ireland, and went on to play for them twice in 1899 (against ireland and Wales).

He remained involved in hockey after he had ceased to play the game. In 1899 he wrote a chapter in J. Nicholson Smith and Philip A. Robson's Hockey: historical and practical, his chapter being dedicated to his position of Outside-right. In this publication he stated that: "Outside-right has been justly called the easiest place to fill satisfactorily in a hockey team.". He later became the honorary secretary to the All England Women's Hockey Association (AEWHA) in 1899 just four years after the founding of that association.

== Later life ==
Edgar married Kate in 1893 and they had a daughter, Dorothy Enid. Edgar Hose died on 21 Oct 1943 aged 76, his death being registered in Cheltenham.
