= Katja Hose =

Computer scientist (born 1980)

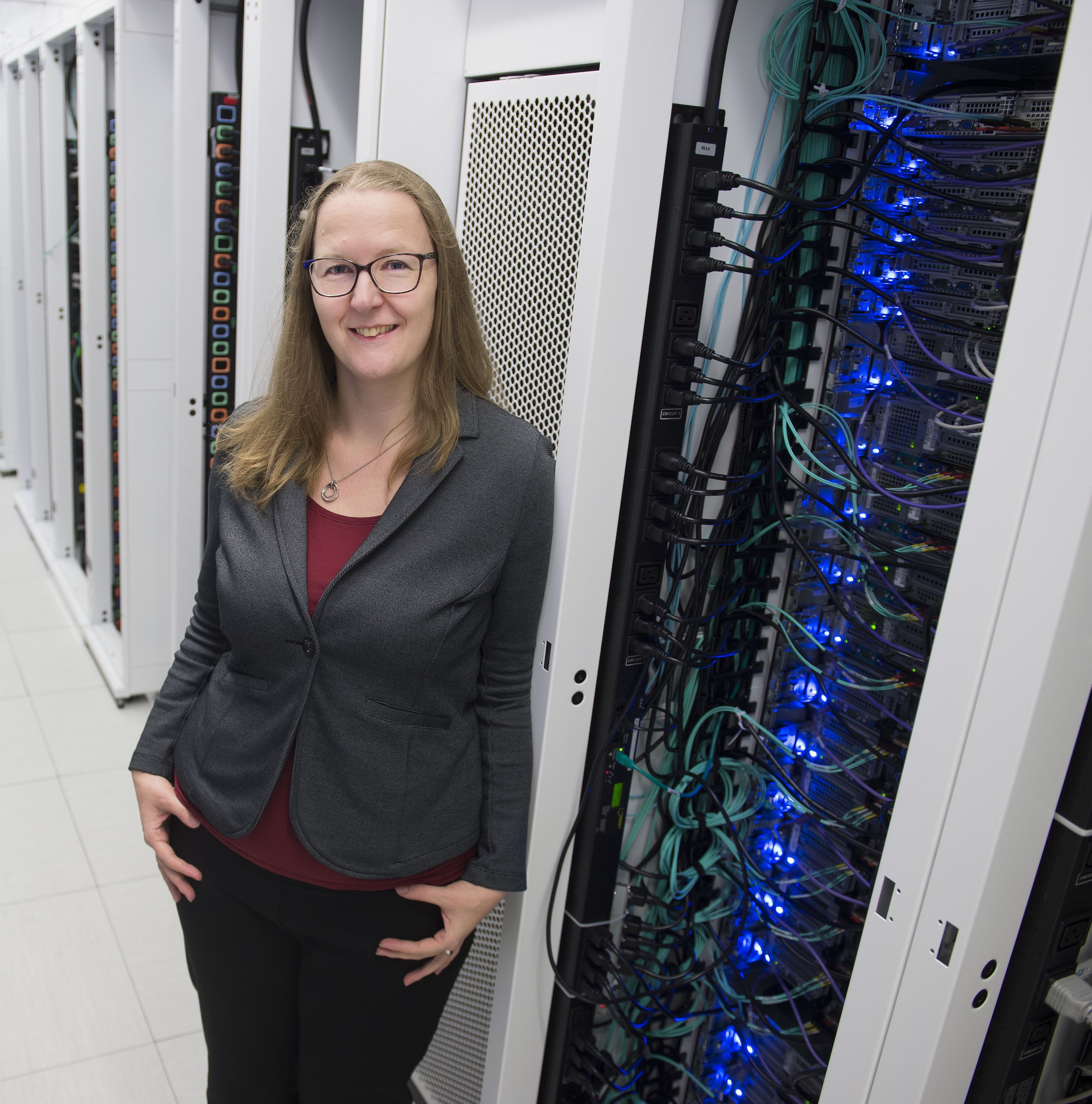
- Born: 1980
- Education: MSc (2004) and PhD (2009) in computer science from Ilmenau University of Technology
- Occupation: Professor
- Employer(s): Aalborg University, TU Wien

Katja Hose (born 1980) is a professor of computer science at Aalborg University and TU Wien.

== Education ==
In 2004, Katja Hose completed her master's degree in computer science at the Ilmenau University of Technology in Germany. In 2009 she received her PhD in computer science - also from Ilmenau University of Technology.

== Career and research ==
Since 2012, Katja Hose has been affiliated with Aalborg University. In 2018, she was appointed as a professor in computer science after having received a grant from the Poul Due Jensen Foundation. Katja Hose researches web science and is involved in the fields of big data, machine learning, and semantic technology.

Her research is based on examining vast amounts of open data which has not been used in prior research. By doing so, this method of research is able to provide her results with more accurate and reliable information.

Furthermore, her work is targeted at creating the best possible conditions for fact-checking by enabling machines to automatically find, process and interpret information. Thereby, this technology functions somewhat like a personal digital assistant, however, Hose's research will be based on data available to the public and will not be bound to a specific corporation or service provider.

As of March 2023, Hose is also affiliated with TU Wien where she is also a professor of computer science.

=== Academic service ===
Hose is an associate editor of Transactions on Graph Data and Knowledge, an editorial board member of Distributed and Parallel Databases, and a former editorial board member of several other journals. She has been the program co-chair of various conferences including the International Semantic Web Conference (ISWC) in 2024 and the International Conference on Extending Database Technology (EDBT) in 2023.

=== Grants ===
Katja Hose is a recipient of a YDUN grant and the Sapere Aude grant from Independent Research Fund Denmark.
