= Boothose =

Overstockings worn with boots

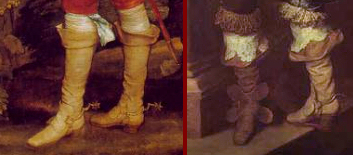
Boots with boothose, early (left) and late (right) 1630s

Boothose (boot-hose, boot hose) are over-stockings or boot liners worn in the sixteenth and seventeenth centuries to protect fine knitted stockings from wear. They first appear around 1450.

Originally a practical item, they were later made of fine linen and sported elaborate lace and embroidered boothose tops. By 1583 Philip Stubbs in his Anatomie of Abuses could decry "The vain excesse of botehosen"

...they must be wrought [embroidered] all ouer, from the gartering place vpward, with nedle worke, clogged with silk of all colors, with birds, foules, beasts, and antiques purtrayed all ouer in comlie sorte. So that I haue knowen the very nedle work of some one payre of these bootehose to stand, some in .iiij. pound, vi. pound, and some in x. pound a péece.

In the 17th century, linen boothose could be trimmed with lavish lace tops turned down over cuffed bucket-topped boots. In mid-century, it was briefly stylish to wear boothose with low-cut shoes, before boothose fell completely out of fashion. They lingered, once again a practical object, under the name boot stockings into the 18th century.

== See also ==
- 1600–1650 in fashion
- 1650–1700 in fashion
