= Maid of Ace =

English rock band based in Hastings

- Origin: Hastings, Sussex
- Label: Maid of Ace Records
- Members: Alison Cara Elliott; Anna Coral Elliott; Amy Catherine Elliott; Abby Charlotte Elliott

Maid of Ace are an English punk rock band based in Hastings. The line-up consists of local-born sisters Alison Cara Elliott (vocals/guitar), Anna Coral Elliott (vocals/guitar), Amy Catherine Elliott (bass/vocals) and Abby Charlotte Elliott (drums). The band have achieved press coverage in the music magazine Vive Le Rock, website Louder Than War. as well as the website for BBC Radio 6 Music, which posted video footage of the band's performance on the BBC Introducing stage at the 2015 Glastonbury Festival.

== History ==
The four band members are sisters and played their first gig in 2005 at their secondary school. They have to date self-released three albums. Second album Maid in England was reviewed by Ged Babey for Louder Than War They have also made several high-profile festival performances including the Glastonbury Festival in 2015, from which their performance of song "Bone Deth" was filmed by the BBC and uploaded as a video to the BBC 6music website and the Rebellion Festival, at which their performance at the 2017 festival was reviewed in Vive Le Rock magazine.

The band supported Green Day on the UK & Ireland leg of The Saviors Tour in June 2024, including a show at Wembley Stadium.

== Discography ==
Studio albums

- Maid of Ace (2014)
- Maid in England (2016)
- Live Fast Or Die (2020)

Singles

- Forever (Devil In The Belfry Remix) / Vacant Night split single with Dee Skusting & The Rodents (2021 Safety Pin Magazine)
