= Peter Hose =

American police officer (1881–1925)

- Born: September 29, 1881; Kahauiki, Kingdom of Hawai'i
- Died: January 4, 1925 (aged 43); Honolulu, Hawaii
- Other name: "Hula Cop"
- Police career
- Country: City police
- Allegiance: United States
- Department: Honolulu Police Department
- Service years: 18

Peter Hose (pronounced José), also known as the "Hula Cop" (September 29, 1881 – January 4, 1925), was the first Honolulu police officer of African descent. He became known for his hula-style of directing traffic.

== Early life ==
Peter Hose was born Kahauiki, Oahu, September 29, 1881. His father was a Portuguese citizen from Cabo Verde.

== Family ==
Hose married Hattie Hose and adopted her son, he had at least a child by her.

== The Hula Cop ==
Hose joined the Honolulu Police Department becoming the first African on the force. As a traffic cop directed traffic in a Hula-style. He was known for his friendliness toward his colleagues and bystanders. Audiences gathered while Hose performed his "traffic hula", amongst them was Charlie Chaplin when he visited in 1917. Hose and Chaplin played a joke on Honolulu by having Chaplin take his place directing traffic, during Chaplin's visit. Hose left the force and became overseer of school janitors, but return to the Department. Hose served in the HPD for 18 years, he died of tuberculosis at his home January 4, 1925 with his family present.
