= Irving Plaza =

Music venue in Manhattan, New York

- Irving Plaza's entrance in November 2026
- Interactive map of Irving Plaza
- Full name: Irving Plaza, powered by Verizon 5G
- Former names: Fillmore New York at Irving Plaza (2007–2010)
- Address: 17 Irving Pl; New York City, U.S.
- Location: Union Square, Manhattan, New York City, U.S.
- Coordinates: 40°44′6″N 73°59′18″W
- Owner: Polish Army Veterans Association of America
- Operator: Live Nation
- Capacity: 1,200
- Public transit: New York City Subway: at 14th Street-Union Square; NYCT Bus: M1, M2, M3, M14A, M14D, SIM7, SIM33, X27, X28

Construction
- Opened: July 14, 1978

Website
- irvingplaza.com

Irving Plaza (known through sponsorship as Irving Plaza, powered by Verizon 5G and formerly known as the Fillmore New York at Irving Plaza) is a ballroom-style music venue located within the Union Square neighborhood of Manhattan in New York City.

It was featured on the Complex City Guide list of "50 Best Concert Venues of America" in 2013.

== History ==
=== Polish Army veterans ===
The building was purchased by the Polish Army Veterans of America District 2 in 1948, and turned into a Polish-American community center. Generals and other distinguished Poles graced its stage including, in 1976, the future Pope John Paul II.

=== Rock venue ===
In 1978, the hall was converted to a rock music venue by future Peppermint Lounge promoters Tom Goodkind and Frank Roccio, who after a year began to share promotional efforts with a "Club 57" crew headed by Jane Friedman and Louis Tropia. Goodkind and Roccio brought in acts such as the B-52s, Talking Heads, the Ramones and, with Friedman and Tropia, a wealth of British bands, establishing the venue as a premier American location for punk and new wave.

The venue was reopened by Chuck Terzella in October 1983, with management by Frank Gallagher and the English DJ Andy Dunkley, presenting reggae and other ethnic music, plus college rock, proclaiming in their ads "We don't have video". Terzella's club filed for bankruptcy in December 1985, and closed in June 1986.

Chris Williamson, who already promoted the punk and hard rock oriented "Rock Hotel" nights at the Ritz, then took over in November 1986. He began programming alternative rock occasionally using the designation "Rock Motel". A New Year's Eve Rock Hotel show with The Dictators turned nasty after the band initiated a food fight and a bouncer became upset and began beating up some of the patrons. Plans by the Polish Veterans to convert the building to condos fell through. They had to spend $25,000 on bringing the venue up to firecode before, in April 1987, Chris Williamson re-opened the club, featuring improved sound and lights, with an inaugural multi-night stand of Big Audio Dynamite. Williamson continued putting on shows into 1988—including hosting the popular "Milky Way" hip hop nights—but, as Irving Place gentrified, there was increasing local opposition to the hall. A plan by Williamson to present a play in the winter of 1988 fell through and, in December 1988, it was announced that the club would close and be demolished and turned into condos. The last show was The Ramones on December 31, 1988. Dee Dee Ramone praised the venue: "It was funky without being a dump."

Ron Delsener took on management in the early 1990s. Live Nation, a spinoff of Clear Channel Communications, renovated and reopened Irving Plaza under the name "Fillmore New York At Irving Plaza" on April 11, 2007, reviving the name of the former Fillmore East in Manhattan's East Village, which had been open from 1968 to 1971. However, in May 2010 Live Nation conceded that the new name had not caught on and due to "unrelenting demand" the name "Irving Plaza" would be restored as from June 23, 2010. A replica of the original marquee was commissioned.

On February 14, 2015, Paul McCartney played a surprise show announced only that morning on Twitter.

On May 25, 2016, four people were shot at a T.I. concert before T.I. took the stage. One of the victims died later at a hospital.

In 2019, the venue closed for renovations, with completion anticipated in 2020. After a fundraising concert that June, the venue officially reopened in August 2021 with a forty-concert season that ran to May 2022. The new capacity was 1,200 and the renovations included improved sightlines, a VIP Lounge and performer amenities. It is operated by Live Nation. The capacity of the floor itself is 750.

== See also ==
- House of Blues
