= Boulevard of Broken Dreams (Green Day song) =

2004 single by Green Day

Single by Green Day

from the album American Idiot
- Released: November 29, 2004
- Genre: Emo; punk rock; hard rock
- Length: 4:22; 4:07 (radio edit)
- Label: Reprise
- Composer: Green Day
- Lyricist: Billie Joe Armstrong
- Producers: Rob Cavallo; Green Day

Green Day singles chronology
"American Idiot" (2004)	"Boulevard of Broken Dreams" (2004)	"Holiday" (2005)

Music video
- "Boulevard of Broken Dreams" on YouTube

"Boulevard of Broken Dreams" is a song by American rock band Green Day. The power ballad is the fourth track from their seventh studio album, American Idiot (2004). Reprise Records released "Boulevard of Broken Dreams" as the second single from American Idiot on November 29, 2004. The song's lyrics were written by lead singer Billie Joe Armstrong, and the music was composed by the band. Production was handled by Rob Cavallo and Green Day.

The song speaks from the point of view of American Idiot's main character, "Jesus of Suburbia", and is a moderate midtempo song characterized by somber and bleak lyrics. This is in contrast to the previous track on the album, "Holiday", which illustrates Jesus of Suburbia's high of being in The City. MTV's Green Day Makes a Video described "Holiday" as a party, and "Boulevard of Broken Dreams" as the subsequent hangover.

The song was ranked number one on Rolling Stone's "Reader's Choice: Singles of the Decade" list in 2009 and number 65 on the "100 Best Songs of the Decade" list in the same year. It has sold over 2 million copies in the United States as of 2010. The single peaked at number two on the Billboard Hot 100, making it Green Day's most successful song in the United States. The song was the ninth-highest-selling single of the 2000s decade with worldwide sales exceeding 5 million copies. As of 2026, "Boulevard of Broken Dreams" is the only song to win both the Grammy Award for Record of the Year and MTV Video Music Award for Video of the Year. It remains one of Green Day's signature songs.

== Background and production ==
In 2004, Green Day released their seventh studio album, American Idiot. A punk rock concept album, American Idiot's narrative is focused on the story of a teenager (who refers to himself as the "Jesus of Suburbia") growing up in the United States under the presidency of George W. Bush during the Iraq War, criticizing both.

Some of the album's songs were written when the band's frontman Billie Joe Armstrong lived alone in New York City for a few weeks in 2003, renting a small loft in the East Village of Manhattan with the goal of coming up with new song ideas. During his time in the city, Armstrong wrote "Boulevard of Broken Dreams". He wrote the song as one about "feeling alone" while living in the city, and trying to take power from that. Armstrong later showcased an almost completed demo to their producer, Rob Cavallo. After hearing the song, Cavallo felt that the song was unlike anything that the band had created previously, and believed that it was going to be successful. The final song was recorded at Ocean Way Recording. The song is named after Boulevard of Broken Dreams, a painting by Gottfried Helnwein that depicts James Dean, Humphrey Bogart, Marilyn Monroe, and Elvis Presley together in a downtown diner, with the title reflecting their deaths.

== Composition and lyrics ==
"Boulevard of Broken Dreams"
An excerpt of the second verse of "Boulevard of Broken Dreams", which Jordan Blum of PopMatters described as having lyrics that illustrated a borderline personality disorder within the Jesus of Suburbia.

"Boulevard of Broken Dreams" is an emo, punk rock and hard rock power ballad. It is four minutes and twenty-two seconds long. The song begins immediately after the previous song in the album, "Holiday", with the introduction to "Boulevard of Broken Dreams" fading in during the song's final note. The song's melody is relatively simple, primarily using the electric guitar feedback from the final note of "Holiday" alongside a progressing acoustic guitar, with Mike Dirnt and Tré Cool providing additional background rhythm. During the song's choruses, extra backing harmonies are present. As the song reaches its end, the melody grows increasingly dissonant. The song follows the same chord progression as "Wonderwall" by Oasis, prompting Oasis' Noel Gallagher to criticize Green Day.

Lyrically, the song reflects the current state of the Jesus of Suburbia after leaving behind his loved ones and soon becoming lonely, facing uncertainty about his future. It is chronologically set one day after "Holiday", a song in which the Jesus of Suburbia initially celebrated his newfound freedom, though later became discontented. The song illustrates this by opening up with a verse about the Jesus of Suburbia walking by himself on a road that has an unclear destination. In the second verse, the Jesus of Suburbia speaks about a line that "divides [him] somewhere in [his] mind". According to Jordan Blum of PopMatters, some of the song's lyrics foreshadow the future of the Jesus of Suburbia, and suggested the protagonist's possible borderline personality disorder. The chorus reiterates his sense of isolation, stating that his shadow is the "only one that walks beside [him]", while also expressing a wish that "someone up there will find [him]", hoping to meet someone to overcome his loneliness, a theme that is resolved in later songs on the album. Lora Kelly of the New York Times described the song as a "low point" in the Jesus of Suburbia's story, and found the lyrics to resemble those of a theater performance.

== Release ==
American Idiot was released on September 21, 2004; "Boulevard of Broken Dreams" is the fourth song on the standard track list. The song was released as the album's second single on November 26, 2004. A live recording of the song is included in the live album Bullet In A Bible, released in 2005. The song was featured in American Idiot, the 2009 jukebox musical based on the album, and its 2010 cast recording. The song was later included in Green Day's greatest hits album God's Favorite Band (2017), and was included in a 20th anniversary reissue of American Idiot, alongside live and demo recordings of the song, in 2024.

== Chart performance ==
"Boulevard of Broken Dreams" was named Record of the Year at the Grammy Awards of 2006. The song's broad appeal was demonstrated by its performance on several Billboard singles charts: it spent 14 weeks at number one on the Mainstream Rock Tracks chart staying there for 38 weeks, 16 weeks at number one on the Modern Rock Tracks chart staying for 32 weeks, 11 weeks at number one on the Adult Top 40 chart staying at 44 weeks, and four weeks at number one on the Mainstream Top 40 staying there for 26 weeks. This was the first song to top the four charts altogether making this song a multi-chart success. On the issue dated March 5, 2005, it reached number two on the Billboard Hot 100 (the highest a Green Day song has ever charted on the Billboard Hot 100), staying there for five weeks behind 50 Cent's "Candy Shop". This was also the first Green Day song to reach the Adult Contemporary chart, peaking at number 30 and though "Good Riddance (Time of Your Life)" didn't chart on the Adult Contemporary, it did chart on its recurrent chart. Throughout 2005, it sold 803,790 digital copies in the United States.

Outside the United States, "Boulevard of Broken Dreams" charted strongly on many international charts. The song debuted and peaked at number five on the UK Singles Chart on the chart dated December 5, 2004, giving the band their third top 10 single in that country. It stayed in the UK top 100 for 29 weeks, becoming their longest-charting single at the time, but "Wake Me Up When September Ends" would log 32 weeks in the UK top 100 nearly a year later; it remains their second-longest stay on the UK chart. In 2021, the British Phonographic Industry awarded the song a Platinum certification for sales and streams exceeding 600,000 units. The single was successful in Ireland, reaching number two in January 2005 on two occasions and totaling 23 weeks in the top 50. It was their highest-peaking single there until "The Saints Are Coming" topped the Irish Singles Chart in 2006. Elsewhere in Europe, the song reached number one in the Czech Republic, number two in Sweden, and the top 10 in Austria, Denmark, and Norway. In Australasia, the song reached number five in both Australia and New Zealand. It stayed on the latter country's chart longer, remaining on the RIANZ chart for 25 weeks compared to 17 weeks on the ARIA Singles Chart. Despite this, the song was overall more popular in Australia, finishing 2005 as the 31st best-selling single and earning a Platinum certification from the ARIA for sales exceeding 70,000 copies.

In response to Hurricane Katrina and the popularity of "Boulevard of Broken Dreams", Green Day donated all of the iTunes proceeds from this song for the year to the American Red Cross for Katrina aid efforts.

== Music video ==
The award-winning music video for "Boulevard of Broken Dreams" was directed by Samuel Bayer. The music videos for "Holiday" and "Boulevard of Broken Dreams" were filmed with a single, continuous storyline—the video for "Boulevard of Broken Dreams" picks up where "Holiday" has left off, with the last few seconds of "Holiday" audible at the start of the "Boulevard of Broken Dreams" video. Both videos were also shot back-to-back. The video depicts the band members after their car has stalled in the desert, and they begin a melancholy walk down a dusty road. Scenes are interspersed with film footage, taken from around Los Angeles, of homeless people and other miserable sights. The video also features performance footage of the band playing the song in an abandoned warehouse.

The video features a 1968 green Mercury Monterey convertible that was modified for filming in the "Holiday" and "Boulevard of Broken Dreams" videos. The car features a hood ornament in the shape of the hand and heart grenade image from the American Idiot album cover, which was also used in the video for "Holiday". The "iron fist" was actually used in the video for "Walking Contradiction", when the band members meet at a car towards the end of the video. The band's name is also on the front of the hood in silver letters. The band rode this car to the 2005 MTV Video Music Awards ceremony. As shown in an MTV Making the Video special, Bayer used unorthodox techniques to achieve the aged film look of the "Boulevard of Broken Dreams" video, including using rear projection (as opposed to green screen) and physically damaging the negative: scratching the film with razor blades, pouring coffee on it, and smudging cigarettes on it.

The video won six awards at the MTV Video Music Awards in 2005, most notably for Video of the Year. It also won Best Group Video, Best Rock Video, Best Direction, Best Editing, and Best Cinematography.

== Personnel ==
Personnel are adapted from the UK CD1 liner notes.

- Green Day – music, production
  - Billie Joe Armstrong – words, lead vocals, guitar
  - Mike Dirnt – bass guitar, backing vocals
  - Tré Cool – drums
- Rob Cavallo – production
- Doug McKean – engineering
- Chris Lord-Alge – mixing
- Chris Bilheimer – art direction

== Charts ==
=== Weekly charts ===
2004–2006 weekly chart performance for "Boulevard of Broken Dreams"
Chart (2004–2006)	Peak position
Australia (ARIA)	5
Austria (Ö3 Austria Top 40)	8
Belgium (Ultratip Bubbling Under Flanders)	4
Belgium (Ultratip Bubbling Under Wallonia)	3
Bolivia (Notimex)	1
Canada (Nielsen BDS)	12
Canada CHR/Pop Top 30 (Radio & Records)	2
Canada Hot AC Top 30 (Radio & Records)	1
Canada Rock Top 30 (Radio & Records)	1
Colombia (B & V Marketing)	5
Czech Republic (IFPI)	1
Denmark (Tracklisten)	8
Europe (Eurochart Hot 100)	13
Finland (Suomen virallinen lista)	16
France (SNEP)	19
Germany (GfK)	13
Hungary (Rádiós Top 40)	3
Ireland (IRMA)	2
Netherlands (Dutch Top 40)	34
Netherlands (Single Top 100)	25
New Zealand (Recorded Music NZ)	5
Norway (VG-lista)	4
Peru (UNIMPRO)	4
Scottish Singles Sales (Official Charts)	3
Sweden (Sverigetopplistan)	2
Switzerland (Schweizer Hitparade)	12
UK Singles (Official Charts)	5
UK Rock & Metal (Official Charts)	1
US Billboard Hot 100	2
US Adult Alternative Airplay (Billboard)	1
US Alternative Airplay (Billboard)	1
US Adult Contemporary (Billboard)	30
US Adult Pop Airplay (Billboard)	1
US Mainstream Rock (Billboard)	1
US Pop Airplay (Billboard)	1
US Pop 100 (Billboard)	1

2020 weekly chart performance
Chart (2020)	Peak position
Finland Airplay (Radiosoittolista)	67
US Hot Rock & Alternative Songs (Billboard)	7

2025 weekly chart performance
Chart (2025)	Peak position
Finland Airplay (Radiosoittolista)	68
Greece International (IFPI)	95

=== Year-end charts ===
2004 year-end chart performance for "Boulevard of Broken Dreams"
Chart (2004)	Position
UK Singles (OCC)	99
US Modern Rock Tracks (Billboard)	91

2005 year-end chart performance for "Boulevard of Broken Dreams"
Chart (2005)	Position
Australia (ARIA)	31
Austria (Ö3 Austria Top 40)	36
Brazil (Crowley)	5
Europe (Eurochart Hot 100)	26
Germany (Media Control GfK)	62
Hungary (Rádiós Top 40)	4
Sweden (Hitlistan)	24
Switzerland (Schweizer Hitparade)	54
UK Singles (OCC)	88
US Billboard Hot 100	7
US Adult Top 40 (Billboard)	1
US Mainstream Rock Tracks (Billboard)	1
US Mainstream Top 40 (Billboard)	5
US Modern Rock Tracks (Billboard)	2
US Triple-A (Billboard)	6
Venezuela Pop/Rock (Record Report)	36

=== Decade-end charts ===
Decade-end chart performance for "Boulevard of Broken Dreams"
Chart (2000–2009)	Position
US Hot Rock Songs (Billboard)	14

== Certifications ==
Certifications and sales for "Boulevard of Broken Dreams"
Region	Certification	Certified units/sales
Australia (ARIA)	Platinum	70,000^{^}
Canada (Music Canada)	6× Platinum	480,000^{‡}
Denmark (IFPI Danmark)	Platinum	90,000^{‡}
Germany (BVMI)	Gold	150,000^{^}
Italy (FIMI)	Platinum	50,000^{‡}
New Zealand (RMNZ)	4× Platinum	120,000^{‡}
Spain (Promusicae)	Platinum	60,000^{‡}
United Kingdom (BPI)	2× Platinum	1,200,000^{‡}
United Kingdom (BPI) "Holiday" / "Boulevard of Broken Dreams"	Gold	400,000^{‡}
United States (RIAA) Digital	Gold	500,000^{*}
United States (RIAA) Mastertone	Gold	500,000^{*}
^{*} Sales figures based on certification alone.^{^} Shipments figures based on certification alone.^{‡} Sales+streaming figures based on certification alone.

== Release history ==
Release dates and formats for "Boulevard of Broken Dreams"
Region	Date	Format(s)	Label(s)	Ref.
United States	November 29, 2004	Contemporary hit radio	Reprise	
United Kingdom	November 29, 2004	CD	Reprise	
Australia	December 13, 2004	CD	Reprise	
