= Extraordinary Girl =

Extraordinary Girl may refer to:

- "Extraordinary Girl", a 2004 song by Green Day from American Idiot
- "Extraordinary Girl", a 1984 song by the O'Jays from Love and More
