= Whatsername (Green Day song) =

2004 song by Green Day

Song by Green Day

from the album American Idiot
- Released: September 21, 2004
- Length: 4:14
- Label: Reprise Records
- Composer: Green Day
- Lyricist: Billie Joe Armstrong
- Producers: Rob Cavallo, Green Day

"Whatsername" is a 2004 song by American rock band Green Day, appearing as the closing track on the band's seventh studio album American Idiot.

== Composition and lyrics ==
According to Alternative Press Magazine, the song is "much softer and [more] melodic" than many of the tracks that precede it on American Idiot. Grammy Awards described the track as one of the album's "quieter moments". The organization likened the track's melodies to those of English songwriters John Lennon and Paul McCartney. Billboard compared the song's "calming" rhythms to the 1983 single "Every Breath You Take" by the Police. The song's instrumentation in its second half incorporates gang vocals and guitar octaves.

"Whatsername" is set an unspecified number of years following the album's main storyline, and acts as its epilogue, according to Alternative Press. The magazine described the song as "bittersweet" and "melancholy". "Whatsername" explores the themes of self-reflection, nostalgia, acceptance and moving forward following a breakup. Green Day frontman and lyricist Billie Joe Armstrong has stated that the song was inspired by the same ex-girlfriend that the songs "She" and "Sassafras Roots" from Dookie were written about. Billboard stated that the track was the moment where the album "reveals itself as a story of accepting life’s random, unfair madness and moving on. [...] Perhaps our main character has learned to accept it for what it is — along with his lost love and boring life — and take the high road."

Student-run newspaper Old Gold & Black explained the song's place in the album's overarching storyline: "Jesus of Suburbia is back home and struggling with the effects of his breakup with Whatsername. All he has are the memories of being with her and his experiences living on the streets. He doesn’t want to forget his lessons, but does want to forget Whatsername and the pain she caused him." The song's lyrics imply that the narrator had forgotten his love interest's name completely. Alternative Press rhetorically asked its readers if it was "really love if he couldn’t even remember her name?"

== Live performances ==
Although the band stopped playing full-band versions of the song live after 2005, they eventually brought it back into the setlist in 2022, with its first performance being at a Lollapalooza warm-up show that year. The song was also played on The Saviors Tour in 2024. It has been used as a setlist closer, mirroring its placement on the album.

== Other versions ==
In 2017, Cameron Boucher of emo bands Old Gray and Sorority Noise "murmur[ed]" the song for an Earth Day compilation album that was organized by members of rock band Pinegrove, with the proceeds going towards relief to Puerto Rico following Hurricane Maria. A live version of the track was released as part of the album's 20-year anniversary reissue in 2024.

== Reception ==
Readers of Alternative Press Magazine voted it the "most underrated" song by the band. The publication cited the track as one of the album's standouts. WMMR ranked "Whatsername" as among Green Day's greatest songs, and questioned the track's status as a non-single.

== See also ==
- American Idiot (musical)
