= Holiday (Green Day song) =

2005 single by Green Day

Single by Green Day

from the album American Idiot
- B-side: "Minority" (live)
- Released: March 14, 2005
- Genre: Punk rock; pop-punk
- Length: 3:52
- Label: Reprise; WEA
- Composer: Green Day
- Lyricist: Billie Joe Armstrong
- Producers: Rob Cavallo; Green Day

Green Day singles chronology
"Boulevard of Broken Dreams" (2004)	"Holiday" (2005)	"Wake Me Up When September Ends" (2005)

Music video
- "Holiday" on YouTube

Audio sample
- file; help

"Holiday" is an anti-war protest song by American rock band Green Day. It was released as the third single from the group's seventh studio album, American Idiot (2004), and is also the third track. Though the song is a prelude to "Boulevard of Broken Dreams", "Holiday" was later released as a single on March 14, 2005.

The song achieved considerable popularity across the world and performed moderately well on the charts. It reached number 19 on the US Billboard Hot 100 and number one on the Hot Modern Rock Tracks and Hot Mainstream Rock Tracks charts. It debuted at number 11 in the United Kingdom and reached the top 20 in Canada, Denmark, Ireland, New Zealand, and Norway.

== Background ==
One of two explicitly political songs on the album (the other being fellow single "American Idiot"), "Holiday" took two months to finish writing, because Armstrong continually felt his lyrics were not good enough. Aided by the encouragement of Rob Cavallo, he completed the song. "Holiday" was inspired by the music of Bob Dylan. Armstrong wanted to write something stronger than "American Idiot", with harsh language to illustrate his points. The song takes aim at American conservatism. Armstrong felt that Republican politicians were "strategic" in alienating one group of people—for example, the gay community—in order to buy the votes of another. He later characterized the song as an outspoken "fuck you" to then-President George W. Bush. Armstrong for the first time imagined how he would perform the songs he was writing, and envisioned an audience responding to his lyric "Can I get another Amen?". The song's bridge, which Armstrong hoped to be as "twisted as possible", was designed as a "politician's worst nightmare".

The chorus's refrain—"This is our lives on holiday"—was intended to reflect the average American's apathy on the issues of the day. Armstrong characterized the song as "not anti-American; it's anti-war." This sentiment has frequently been reiterated in live performances over the subsequent decades, including on the live album Bullet in a Bible.

== Music video ==
The first half of the video takes place in a car (a 1968 Mercury Monterey convertible), where Billie Joe Armstrong, Mike Dirnt and Tré Cool are partying around in Las Vegas. In the second half, they are cavorting in a bar where each of the band members portrays several different characters. Billie Joe Armstrong plays the mentioned Representative of California, two fighting clients, a punk rocker and a nerd. Tré Cool plays a drunken priest, an arrested patron, and a female prostitute. Mike Dirnt plays the barman, another punk, and a policeman. There are also scenes featuring seemingly worn-down can-can dancers. At the end of the video, the car smokes to a halt in the field that "Boulevard of Broken Dreams" begins in. Like the video for "Boulevard of Broken Dreams", this video was directed by Samuel Bayer.

The band arrived at the 2005 MTV Video Music Awards in the same car, this time "pimped out" by James Washburn, a friend of the band.

== Live performances ==
"Holiday" has been included on the set lists of numerous Green Day concert tours, some of which played American Idiot in its entirety to promote the album. The song was included on the set list for the Revolution Radio Tour in 2016, where the songs lyrics were adjusted to protest against Donald Trump's presidential campaign. It was later included on the set list for the Hella Mega Tour, a concert tour for Green Day, Fall Out Boy, and Weezer that began in 2021. The song was later included on the set list for the Saviors Tour, alongside every other song from American Idiot.

At Super Bowl LX, Green Day performed a medley that included "Holiday". The bridge was omitted and the band refrained from playing the song's political lyrics. Armstrong had condemned the Trump administration and United States Immigration and Customs Enforcement while performing at a pre-Super Bowl concert, while dedicating "Holiday" to the city of Minneapolis amid ICE's Operation Metro Surge.

== Track listings ==
UK CD1 and European CD single
No.	Title	Length
1.	"Holiday"	3:52
2.	"Minority" (live)	6:01

UK CD2 and Australian CD single
No.	Title	Length
1.	"Holiday"	3:52
2.	"Holiday" (live)	4:06
3.	"Boulevard of Broken Dreams" (live)	4:24

UK 7-inch picture disc

Side A
No.	Title	Length
1.	"Holiday"	3:53

Side B
No.	Title	Length
1.	"Minority" (live)	6:01

- All live tracks were recorded on September 21, 2004, at the Irving Plaza in New York City.

== Personnel ==
Personnel are adapted from the UK-European CD1 liner notes.

- Green Day – music, production
  - Billie Joe Armstrong – words, lead vocals, guitar
  - Mike Dirnt – bass guitar, backing vocals
  - Tré Cool – drums
- Rob Cavallo – production
- Doug McKean – engineering
- Chris Lord-Alge – mixing
- Chris Bilheimer – art direction
- Marina Chavez – band photo

== Charts ==
=== Weekly charts ===
2005–2006 weekly chart performance for "Holiday"
Chart (2005–2006)	Peak position
Australia (ARIA)	24
Austria (Ö3 Austria Top 40)	45
Canada (Nielsen BDS)	28
Canada CHR/Pop Top 30 (Radio & Records)	15
Canada Hot AC Top 30 (Radio & Records)	13
Canada Rock Top 30 (Radio & Records)	2
Czech Republic Airplay (ČNS IFPI)	81
Denmark (Tracklisten)	14
Germany (GfK)	50
Hungary (Dance Top 40)	31
Ireland (IRMA)	13
Netherlands (Dutch Top 40 Tipparade)	8
New Zealand (Recorded Music NZ)	13
Norway (VG-lista)	19
Scottish Singles Sales (Official Charts)	12
Sweden (Sverigetopplistan)	25
Switzerland (Schweizer Hitparade)	44
UK Singles (Official Charts)	11
UK Rock & Metal (Official Charts)	1
US Billboard Hot 100	19
US Adult Pop Airplay (Billboard)	5
US Alternative Airplay (Billboard)	1
US Mainstream Rock (Billboard)	1
US Pop Airplay (Billboard)	13
US Pop 100 (Billboard)	18

2024–2025 weekly chart performance for "Holiday"
Chart (2024–2025)	Peak position
Finland Airplay (Radiosoittolista)	71
Japan Hot Overseas (Billboard)	20

=== Year-end charts ===
Year-end chart performance for "Holiday"
Chart (2005)	Position
UK Singles (OCC)	188
US Billboard Hot 100	39
US Adult Top 40 (Billboard)	21
US Mainstream Rock Tracks (Billboard)	14
US Mainstream Top 40 (Billboard)	50
US Modern Rock Tracks (Billboard)	7

== Certifications ==
Certifications and sales for "Holiday"
Region	Certification	Certified units/sales
Canada (Music Canada)	3× Platinum	240,000^{‡}
Italy (FIMI)	Platinum	100,000^{‡}
New Zealand (RMNZ)	Platinum	30,000^{‡}
Spain (Promusicae)	Gold	30,000^{‡}
United Kingdom (BPI)	Platinum	600,000^{‡}
United Kingdom (BPI) "Holiday" / "Boulevard of Broken Dreams"	Gold	400,000^{‡}
United States (RIAA)	Platinum	1,000,000^{*}
^{*} Sales figures based on certification alone.^{‡} Sales+streaming figures based on certification alone.

== Release history ==
Release dates and formats for "Holiday"
Region	Date	Format(s)	Label(s)	Ref.
United Kingdom	March 14, 2005	CD	Reprise	
United Kingdom	March 14, 2005	Digital download	Reprise	
Australia	March 28, 2005	CD	Reprise	
United States	May 16, 2005	Contemporary hit radio	Reprise	

== See also ==
- List of anti-war songs
