= 2005 MTV Video Music Awards =

Award ceremony

- Date: Sunday, August 28, 2005
- Location: American Airlines Arena, Miami, Florida
- Country: United States
- Hosted by: Diddy

Highlights
- Most awards: Green Day (7)
- Most nominations: Green Day (8)
- Website: http://www.mtv.com/ontv/vma/past-vmas/2005/

Television/radio coverage
- Network: MTV
- Produced by: Michael Dempsey; Salli Frattini; Dave Sirulnick
- Directed by: Beth McCarthy-Miller; Seher Bedi

The 2005 MTV Video Music Awards aired live on August 28, 2005, honoring the best music videos from the previous year. The show was hosted by Diddy at the American Airlines Arena in Miami, Florida. The big winner of the night was Green Day, who took home seven VMA's, including Best Rock Video, Best Group Video, Viewer's Choice, and Video of the Year.

Although the approach of a strong tropical storm (which became Hurricane Katrina prior to its first landfall just north of Miami) cancelled much of the pre-show activities, the show itself went on as scheduled after the storm passed. Later that year, the MTV VMAs for Latin America, scheduled for Cancún, were canceled due to Hurricane Wilma (which later made an identical but reverse path across South Florida as Katrina did).

== Background ==
MTV announced on April 5 that the 2005 Video Music Awards would be held on August 28 at the American Airlines Arena in Miami, marking the venue's second consecutive year hosting the ceremony. Nominees were announced on July 25 at a press conference hosted by Kelly Clarkson, Kanye West, and Diddy in Miami. At the same press conference, MTV announced that Diddy would host the ceremony. The ceremony had a water theme, with several water features constructed for the ceremony by WET. The ceremony broadcast was preceded by the 2005 MTV Video Music Awards Pre-Show by the Shore. Hosted by Kurt Loder and SuChin Pak with reports from John Norris, Sway, and Gideon Yago, the broadcast featured red carpet interviews and performances by Mike Jones featuring Slim Thug and Paul Wall, Rihanna, and Fall Out Boy. The ceremony was also the first to expand beyond linear television with a "My VMAs" channel on MTV Overdrive featuring bonus material both before and after the ceremony. It also was one of the first to have a 16:9 format.

== Performances ==
Artist(s)	Song(s)
Pre-show
Mike Jones; Slim Thug; Paul Wall	"Still Tippin'"
Rihanna	"Pon de Replay"
Fall Out Boy	"Sugar, We're Goin Down"
Main show
Green Day	"Boulevard of Broken Dreams"
Ludacris; Bobby Valentino	"Pimpin' All Over the World"
MC Hammer	"U Can't Touch This"
Shakira; Alejandro Sanz	"La Tortura"
R. Kelly	"Trapped in the Closet (Chapter 1)"
The Killers	"Mr. Brightside" (Note: Pre-recorded at the Hotel Victor)
Diddy; Snoop Dogg; The Notorious B.I.G.	"Juicy" "Warning"
Don Omar	"Reggaeton Latino"
Tego Calderón	"Abayarde"
Daddy Yankee	"Gasolina"
Coldplay	"Speed of Sound"
Kanye West; Jamie Foxx	"Gold Digger"
Mariah Carey; Jadakiss; Jermaine Dupri	"Shake It Off" "We Belong Together (Remix)" (Note: From the National Hotel)
50 Cent; Mobb Deep; Tony Yayo	"Disco Inferno" "Outta Control" "So Seductive"
My Chemical Romance	"Helena"
Kelly Clarkson	"Since U Been Gone"

== Appearances ==
=== Pre-show ===
- Kurt Loder – introduced the winners of the professional categories
- SuChin Pak – announced the winners of Best Group Video and Best Video Game Soundtrack

=== Main show ===
- Nelly and Lindsay Lohan – presented Best Female Video and Best Male Video
- Beavis and Butt-head – appeared in different vignettes about voting procedures for the Viewer's Choice award
- Ciara and Missy Elliott – introduced Ludacris and Bobby Valentino
- Orlando Bloom and Kirsten Dunst – presented Best Rock Video
- Grandmaster Flash – DJed after some commercial breaks and during the "dance-off" sequence
- Omarion and Luke (from 2 Live Crew) – appeared in a "dance-off" sequence with Diddy
- Ashlee and Jessica Simpson – presented Best R&B Video
- Jessica Alba, Dwyane Wade and Shaquille O'Neal – introduced Shakira and Alejandro Sanz
- Usher – introduced a "Clowning vs. Krumping" dance sequence and presented Best Dance Video
- Eric Roberts – introduced R. Kelly
- Hilary Duff and Joel Madden – introduced the Killers
- Lil' Kim and Jeremy Piven – presented Best Rap Video
- Common and Johnny Knoxville – presented the MTV2 Award
- Fat Joe – introduced the reggaeton performances and presented Best Hip-Hop Video
- Pharrell – introduced Coldplay
- B5 – introduced the next pair of presenters
- Ricky Martin and Joss Stone – presented Best Pop Video
- Alicia Keys and John Legend – introduced Kanye West and Jamie Foxx
- Snoop Dogg – introduced Dane Cook, who performed a short comic monologue, and presented Best New Artist in a Video with him
- Eva Longoria – introduced Mariah Carey
- Lil Jon and Paulina Rubio – presented Breakthrough Video
- Fergie and will.i.am – introduced 50 Cent
- Bow Wow and Paris Hilton – presented Viewer's Choice
- Jamie Foxx – introduced Destiny's Child and presented Video of the Year with them

== Winners and nominees ==
Winners are in bold text.

Video of the Year	Best Male Video
**Green Day – "Boulevard of Broken Dreams"**; Coldplay – "Speed of Sound"; Snoop Dogg (featuring Pharrell) – "Drop It Like It's Hot"; Gwen Stefani – "Hollaback Girl"; Kanye West – "Jesus Walks"	**Kanye West – "Jesus Walks"**; 50 Cent – "Candy Shop"; Beck – "E-Pro"; John Legend – "Ordinary People"; Usher – "Caught Up"
Best Female Video	Best Group Video
**Kelly Clarkson – "Since U Been Gone"**; Amerie – "1 Thing"; Mariah Carey – "We Belong Together"; Shakira (featuring Alejandro Sanz) – "La Tortura"; Gwen Stefani – "Hollaback Girl"	**Green Day – "Boulevard of Broken Dreams"**; The Black Eyed Peas – "Don't Phunk with My Heart"; Destiny's Child (featuring T.I. and Lil Wayne) – "Soldier"; The Killers – "Mr. Brightside"; U2 – "Vertigo"
Best New Artist in a Video	Best Pop Video
**The Killers – "Mr. Brightside"**; Ciara (featuring Missy Elliott) – "1, 2 Step"; The Game – "Dreams"; John Legend – "Ordinary People"; My Chemical Romance – "Helena"	**Kelly Clarkson – "Since U Been Gone"**; Lindsay Lohan – "Rumors"; Jesse McCartney – "Beautiful Soul"; Ashlee Simpson – "Pieces of Me"; Gwen Stefani – "Hollaback Girl"
Best Rock Video	Best R&B Video
**Green Day – "Boulevard of Broken Dreams"**; Foo Fighters – "Best of You"; The Killers – "Mr. Brightside"; My Chemical Romance - "Helena"; Weezer – "Beverly Hills"	**Alicia Keys – "Karma"**; Mariah Carey – "We Belong Together"; Ciara (featuring Ludacris) – "Oh"; John Legend – "Ordinary People"; Usher and Alicia Keys – "My Boo"
Best Rap Video	Best Hip-Hop Video
**Ludacris – "Number One Spot"**; Eminem – "Just Lose It"; The Game (featuring 50 Cent) – "Hate It or Love It"; T.I. – "U Don't Know Me"; Ying Yang Twins – "Wait (The Whisper Song)"	**Missy Elliott (featuring Ciara and Fatman Scoop) – "Lose Control"**; Common – "Go"; Nas (featuring Olu Dara) – "Bridging the Gap"; Snoop Dogg (featuring Pharrell) – "Drop It Like It's Hot"; Kanye West – "Jesus Walks"
Best Dance Video	Breakthrough Video
**Missy Elliott (featuring Ciara and Fatman Scoop) – "Lose Control"**; Ciara (featuring Missy Elliott) – "1, 2 Step"; Destiny's Child – "Lose My Breath"; Jennifer Lopez – "Get Right"; Shakira (featuring Alejandro Sanz) – "La Tortura"	**Gorillaz – "Feel Good Inc."**; Missy Elliott (featuring Ciara and Fatman Scoop) – "Lose Control"; Eminem – "Mosh"; Sarah McLachlan – "World on Fire"; U2 – "Vertigo"
Best Direction in a Video	Best Choreography in a Video
**Green Day – "Boulevard of Broken Dreams" (Director: Samuel Bayer)**; Missy Elliott (featuring Ciara and Fatman Scoop) – "Lose Control" (Directors: Dave Meyers and Missy Elliott); Jennifer Lopez – "Get Right" (Directors: Francis Lawrence and Diane Martel); U2 – "Vertigo" (Directors: Alex and Martin); The White Stripes – "Blue Orchid" (Director: Floria Sigismondi)	**Gwen Stefani – "Hollaback Girl" (Choreographer: Kishaya Dudley)**; Amerie – "1 Thing" (Choreographer: Jamaica Craft); Missy Elliott (featuring Ciara and Fatman Scoop) – "Lose Control" (Choreographer: Hi-Hat); Jennifer Lopez – "Get Right" (Choreographers: Richmond Talauega and Anthony Talauega); My Chemical Romance – "Helena" (Choreographer: Michael Rooney)
Best Special Effects in a Video	Best Art Direction in a Video
**Gorillaz – "Feel Good Inc." (Special Effects: Passion Pictures)**; Coldplay – "Speed of Sound" (Special Effects: A52); Missy Elliott (featuring Ciara and Fatman Scoop) – "Lose Control" (Special Effects: Radium); Ludacris – "Number One Spot" (Special Effects: 20Twenty); The Mars Volta – "The Widow" (Special Effects: Artificial Army); U2 – "Vertigo" (Special Effects: Jam Abelenet)	**Gwen Stefani – "What You Waiting For?" (Art Director: Zach Matthews)**; Green Day – "American Idiot" (Art Director: Jan Roelfs); The Killers – "Mr. Brightside" (Art Director: Laura Fox); System of a Down – "B.Y.O.B." (Art Director: Jeremy Reed); The White Stripes – "Blue Orchid" (Art Director: Sue Tebbutt)
Best Editing in a Video	Best Cinematography in a Video
**Green Day – "Boulevard of Broken Dreams" (Editor: Tim Royes)**; Coldplay – "Speed of Sound" (Editor: Adam Pertofsky); Foo Fighters – "Best of You" (Editor: Nathan Cox); Jennifer Lopez – "Get Right" (Editor: Dustin Robertson); Simple Plan – "Untitled" (Editor: Richard Alarcon); Gwen Stefani – "What You Waiting For?" (Editor: Dustin Robertson)	**Green Day – "Boulevard of Broken Dreams" (Director of Photography: Samuel Bayer)**; Coldplay – "Speed of Sound" (Director of Photography: Harris Savides); Modest Mouse – "Ocean Breathes Salty" (Director of Photography: Danny Hiele); Simple Plan – "Untitled" (Director of Photography: Michael Bernard); U2 – "Vertigo" (Director of Photography: Omer Ganai); The White Stripes – "Blue Orchid" (Director of Photography: Chris Soos)
Best Video Game Soundtrack	MTV2 Award
**Dance Dance Revolution Extreme (Konami)**; Def Jam: Fight for NY (Electronic Arts); Madden NFL 2005 (Electronic Arts); Midnight Club 3: DUB Edition (Rockstar Games); Tony Hawk's Underground 2 (Activision)	**Fall Out Boy – "Sugar, We're Goin Down"**; Akon (featuring Styles P) – "Locked Up"; The Bravery – "An Honest Mistake"; Daddy Yankee – "Gasolina"; Mike Jones (featuring Slim Thug and Paul Wall) – "Still Tippin'"; My Chemical Romance – "Helena"
Viewer's Choice	
**Green Day – "American Idiot"**; Kelly Clarkson – "Since U Been Gone"; My Chemical Romance – "Helena"; Shakira (featuring Alejandro Sanz) – "La Tortura"; Snoop Dogg (featuring Pharrell) – "Drop It Like It's Hot"

== Artists with multiple wins and nominations ==
Artists who received multiple awards
Wins	Artist
7	Green Day
2	Kelly Clarkson
2	Gorillaz
2	Missy Elliott
2	Gwen Stefani

Artists who received multiple nominations
Nominations	Artist
8	Green Day
6	Missy Elliott
6	Gwen Stefani
5	My Chemical Romance
5	U2
4	Coldplay
4	Jennifer Lopez
4	The Killers
3	Ciara
3	Kelly Clarkson
3	John Legend
3	Shakira
3	Snoop Dogg
3	Kanye West
3	The White Stripes
2	Alicia Keys
2	Amerie
2	Mariah Carey
2	Destiny's Child
2	Electronic Arts
2	Eminem
2	Foo Fighters
2	The Game
2	Gorillaz
2	Ludacris
2	Simple Plan
2	Usher

== Music Videos with multiple wins and nominations ==
Music Videos that received multiple awards
Wins	Artist	Music Video
6	Green Day	"Boulevard of Broken Dreams"
2	Gorillaz	"Feel Good Inc."
2	Kelly Clarkson	"Since U Been Gone"
2	Missy Elliott (featuring Ciara and Fatman Scoop)	"Lose Control"

Music Videos that received multiple nominations
Nominations	Artist	Music Video
6	Green Day	"Boulevard of Broken Dreams"
6	Missy Elliott (featuring Ciara and Fatman Scoop)	"Lose Control"
5	My Chemical Romance	"Helena"
5	U2	"Vertigo"
4	Coldplay	"Speed of Sound"
4	Gwen Stefani	"Hollaback Girl"
4	Jennifer Lopez	"Get Right"
4	The Killers	"Mr. Brightside"
3	John Legend	"Ordinary People"
3	Kanye West	"Jesus Walks"
3	Kelly Clarkson	"Since U Been Gone"
3	Shakira (featuring Alejandro Sanz)	"La Tortura"
3	Snoop Dogg (featuring Pharrell)	"Drop It Like It's Hot"
3	The White Stripes	"Blue Orchid"
2	Amerie	"1 Thing"
2	Ciara (featuring Missy Elliott)	"1, 2 Step"
2	Foo Fighters	"Best of You"
2	Gorillaz	"Feel Good Inc."
2	Green Day	"American Idiot"
2	Gwen Stefani	"What You Waiting For?"
2	Ludacris	"Number One Spot"
2	Mariah Carey	"We Belong Together"
2	Simple Plan	"Untitled"

== Music ==
The music for the telecast was scored by Linkin Park's co-vocalist Mike Shinoda and rapper Lil Jon. The score was released as an EP on August 31, 2005, and later released by Shinoda five years later on March 1, 2010.

== See also ==
- 2005 MTV Europe Music Awards
