= Born of Fire =

2011 Super Bowl commercial for the Chrysler 200 featuring Eminem

- Eminem looks at the camera with a choir standing behind him to speak the final line of the commercial.
- Agency: Wieden+Kennedy
- Client: Chrysler
- Language: English
- Running time: 2:02
- Product: Chrysler 200
- Release date: February 6, 2011
- Directed by: Samuel Bayer
- Starring: Eminem Selected of God Kevin Yon (voiceover)
- Production company: Serial Pictures
- Produced by: Bob Wendt
- Country: United States

"Born of Fire", also known as "Imported from Detroit", is the television commercial that introduced the Chrysler 200 to the public. The commercial ran for the first time during Super Bowl XLV, and, at two minutes long, it is one of the longest commercials ever shown during a Super Bowl. It was created by Wieden + Kennedy.

The commercial tells the contemporary history of the city of Detroit, through the use of narrative (provided by Rockford, Michigan resident Kevin Yon) and crisp images, while juxtaposing both grim and beautiful images of the city and its multi-racial population with the portrayed luxury of the car. American rapper Eminem, who is from the Detroit area, drives the Chrysler 200 through the city to the Fox Theatre, passing by several neighborhoods and landmarks. Upon arriving, he walks inside the theater to the stage, where the Selected of God choir is singing. Eminem then walks on the stage and says to the camera, "This is the Motor City, and this is what we do." An instrumental version of his song, "Lose Yourself", plays in the background throughout much of the ad, with the aforementioned choir providing additional source music.

Its airing is credited with revitalizing the image of Detroit, Chrysler, and the American automotive industry.
