= Just Another Day (John Mellencamp song) =

Single by John Mellencamp

from the album Mr. Happy Go Lucky
- Released: February 4, 1997
- Genre: Pop rock
- Length: 3:28
- Label: Mercury
- Songwriter: John Mellencamp
- Producer: Little Bastard

John Mellencamp singles chronology
"Key West Intermezzo (I Saw You First)" (1996)	"Just Another Day" (1997)	"Without Expression" (1997)

"Just Another Day" is a song by American rock singer John Mellencamp. It was released on February 4, 1997, as the second single from his 14th studio album, Mr. Happy Go Lucky (1996), and became Mellencamp's final number-one hit in Canada. In the United States, it reached number 46 on the Billboard Hot 100.

== Critical reception ==
Larry Flick, of Billboard magazine reviewed the song favorably, calling it a "richly atmospheric blend of acoustic rhythms and raw pop-rock power."

== Music video ==
The music video was directed by Samuel Bayer and premiered on November 20, 1996.

== Charts ==
=== Weekly charts ===
Chart (1997)	Peak position
Australia (ARIA)	81
Canada Top Singles (RPM)	1
Canada Adult Contemporary (RPM)	9
US Billboard Hot 100	46
US Adult Alternative Airplay (Billboard)	2
US Adult Pop Airplay (Billboard)	13
US Adult Contemporary (Billboard)	24
US Pop Airplay (Billboard)	27
US Mainstream Rock (Billboard)	13

=== Year-end charts ===
Chart (1997)	Position
Canada Top Singles (RPM)	16
Canada Adult Contemporary (RPM)	51
US Adult Top 40 (Billboard)	35
US Mainstream Rock Tracks (Billboard)	37
US Top 40/Mainstream (Billboard)	94
US Triple-A (Billboard)	21
