= Wake Me Up When September Ends =

2005 single by Green Day

Single by Green Day

from the album American Idiot
- Released: June 13, 2005
- Studio: Ocean Way (Los Angeles)
- Genre: Emo
- Length: 4:45
- Label: Reprise
- Composer: Green Day
- Lyricist: Billie Joe Armstrong
- Producer: Rob Cavallo

Green Day singles chronology
"Holiday" (2005)	"Wake Me Up When September Ends" (2005)	"Jesus of Suburbia" (2005)

Music videos
- "Wake Me Up When September Ends" on YouTube

"Wake Me Up When September Ends" is a song by the American rock band Green Day and the fourth single from their seventh studio album, American Idiot (2004). Written by the band's front man Billie Joe Armstrong, the song is about the death of Armstrong's father in September 1982 and his life since. The song's lyrics have also been interpreted in other ways, including as a song about the victims and survivors of the September 11 attacks. The song is a rock ballad, starting with an acoustic guitar and later introducing an electric guitar and bells. It was recorded at Ocean Way Recording.

The song was released as a single on June 13, 2005, through Reprise Records. It charted in several countries, reaching number one in the Czech Republic and Croatia, while reaching number six on the US Billboard Hot 100. The song was certified platinum once by the Recording Industry Association of America (RIAA), and four times by Music Canada. While initial reactions to the song were mixed, it has been since praised for its lyrics and is now considered one of Green Day's best. It received the Kids' Choice Award for Favorite Song award at the 2006 Kids' Choice Awards, while Green Day was picked for the Kids' Choice Award for Favorite Music Group.

An accompanying music video, filmed in Los Angeles, was directed by Samuel Bayer. It depicts a young couple (played by Jamie Bell and Evan Rachel Wood) that are split up after the boyfriend joins the United States Marine Corps during the Iraq War, and leaves his fate uncertain. Bayer said that he designed the music video as a "mini-movie", different from other music videos, while also aiming to spread awareness about the Iraq War's effects on soldiers. The music video was well received, reaching number one on Total Request Live and being voted as the second best music video of 2005 by readers of Rolling Stone.

"Wake Me Up When September Ends" has been performed at several of the band's concerts, and has also been covered by other musicians. In the years since its release, the song has often seen annual spikes in popularity during the final days of September, commonly coinciding with internet memes about the song. The song became associated with Hurricane Katrina after a blogger created a viral video pairing the song with news coverage of the disaster.

== Background and production ==
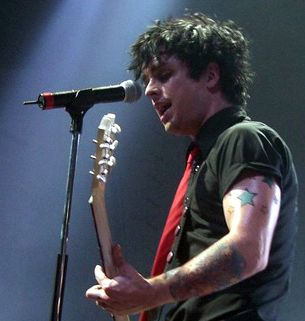
Green Day frontman Billie Joe Armstrong performing in 2005

In 2004, Green Day released their seventh studio album, American Idiot. A punk rock concept album, American Idiot's narrative is focused on the story of a teenager (who refers to himself as the "Jesus of Suburbia") growing up in the United States under the presidency of George W. Bush during the Iraq War, criticizing both.

One of the songs in American Idiot, "Wake Me Up When September Ends", is not entirely related to the album's central narrative. The song was inspired by the death of lead singer Billie Joe Armstrong's father in September 1982. On the day of his father's funeral, Armstrong reportedly ran home, locked himself in his room, and when his mother came to check on him, he told her to wake him up when September ended, and held onto the song title for several years after. In an interview with the Howard Stern Show, Armstrong said that he initially avoided writing a song about his father for years, until he "[had] a breakthrough" and created "Wake Me Up When September Ends" in his honor. It was recorded at Ocean Way Recording, and produced by Rob Cavallo.

== Release ==
American Idiot was released on September 21, 2004, through Reprise Records; "Wake Me Up When September Ends" is the eleventh song on the standard track list. It was released as the album's fourth single on June 13, 2005, also through Reprise. A live recording of the song was included in the live album Bullet In A Bible, released in 2005. The song was featured in American Idiot, the 2009 jukebox musical based on the album, and its 2010 cast recording. The song was later included in Green Day's greatest hits album God's Favorite Band (2017). The song was included as part of the 20th anniversary reissue of American Idiot, alongside live and demo recordings of the song, released on October 25, 2024. A demo recording of the song, set to be part of the reissue, was released early on September 6, 2024, alongside the B-side track "Governator" and a live recording of "St. Jimmy"

== Composition ==
"Wake Me Up When September Ends"
A 28-second excerpt of "Wake Me Up When September Ends".

"Wake Me Up When September Ends" is a slow-paced emo rock ballad. It is four minutes and forty-five seconds long. It begins with an acoustic guitar arpeggio, later introducing other instruments such as an electric guitar and bells which create what Jordan Blum of PopMatters described as a "militarist rhythm"; Blum described each element of the song as "aching to express the same angst". The last few seconds of the song are silence only broken by a few reverberated guitar notes, which Blum described to "embody the sad aftermath". Several journalists found the song to be similar to "Good Riddance (Time Of Your Life)", an earlier Green Day song; Rob Sheffield of Rolling Stone considered "Wake Me Up When September Ends" to be the song's "sadder, more adult sequel".

Marginally diverging from the album's main narrative, the song's lyrics are primarily about the life of Armstrong after his father's death, and his life since. Throughout the song, Armstrong emphasizes the time that had passed since then, stating "Like my father's come to pass / Seven years has gone so fast", which is repeated later in the song as "Twenty years has gone so fast", referring to how long it had been by the time he recorded the song. While Armstrong's personal experiences were the primary basis for the song, many have considered the song to have multiple meanings. These meanings range from contributing to the narrative of American Idiot to the song being interpreted as a homage to the victims of the September 11 attacks. The former is supported by lyrics that reference an earlier song in the album (specifically "Holiday") and the friends and family that the Jesus of Suburbia left behind on his journey. After realizing what he had lost, he chooses to return home in the next song in the album, "Homecoming".

== Critical reception ==
Initial reception towards "Wake Me Up When September Ends" was mixed. A staff reviewer of IGN described the song as "powerful" and praised the lack of direct connections to the rest of the album, writing that it allowed the song to provide "universal emotion". Tim O'Neil of PopMatters expressed a mixed opinion on the song, writing that it was one of the most emotionally impactful songs on the album, but also felt that the song could have been a bit generic, describing it as "used at the end of an episode of Dawson's Creek" or another popular show. Johnny Luftus of Pitchfork criticized the song's shift in tone from the rest of the album, believing it to be slow compared to the rest of American Idiot, describing it as the "cost of ambition". He later criticized the song again in a review of Bullet in a Bible, stating that the song made it "unclear what Idiot was supposed to mean in the first place".

Retrospective opinions on the song have been positive. In a retrospective article, Jordan Blum of PopMatters described "Wake Me Up When September Ends" as the most poignant song in the album, writing that the song could be considered "deceptively simple yet subtly brilliant" based on the different possible interpretations of its lyrics. When viewing it as a personal song for Armstrong, he described it as one of his "bravest and most revealing songs", as well as "overwhelmingly truthful and touching" when viewing it as a song about the September 11 attacks. He also considered "Wake Me Up When September Ends" to be the best song that Green Day had ever written. Matthew Leimkuehler of American Songwriter described the song as having a "memorable, powerful message" that discussed long-lasting grief and the consequences of unexpected life events.

When ranking the band's songs, Scott Waldman of Alternative Press and the staff of Consequence placed "Wake Me Up When September Ends" at numbers 8 and 20, respectively. The former's Philip Cosores said that the song "provided an emotional gut-punch", while the latter said that the song reminded him of his own father, thanking Armstrong for writing the song. Jon O'Brien ranked the song as the fourth best in American Idiot, describing Armstrong's performance as "one of his most powerful vocals", and one that could still compare to more recent emo songs.

== Commercial performance ==
In the United States, the song reached number six on the Billboard Hot 100, and spent 20 weeks on the chart. It also reached number two on the Billboard Modern Rock Tracks chart and number 12 on the Mainstream Rock Tracks chart. On Billboard year-end charts for 2005, "Wake Me Up When September Ends" was number 46. The song was certified platinum by the RIAA in 2008. In Canada, the song entered the CHR/Pop Top 30 at number four, the Hot AC Top 30 at number three, and the Rock Top 30 at number one. It was certified platinum in the country four times by Music Canada.

Outside of North America, "Wake Me Up When September Ends" reached number one on the charts in Croatia and the Czech Republic, as well as reaching number one on the German airplay chart. In the United Kingdom, it reached number one on the UK Rock & Metal chart, spending seven weeks at that spot, as well as peaking at number eight on the UK singles chart. As of February 2020, it is the band's fourth-most-successful song in the country. The song won the Favorite Song award at the 2006 Kids' Choice Awards, hosted by Nickelodeon. At the same ceremony, Green Day was the recipient of the Kids' Choice Award for Favorite Music Group.

== Music video ==
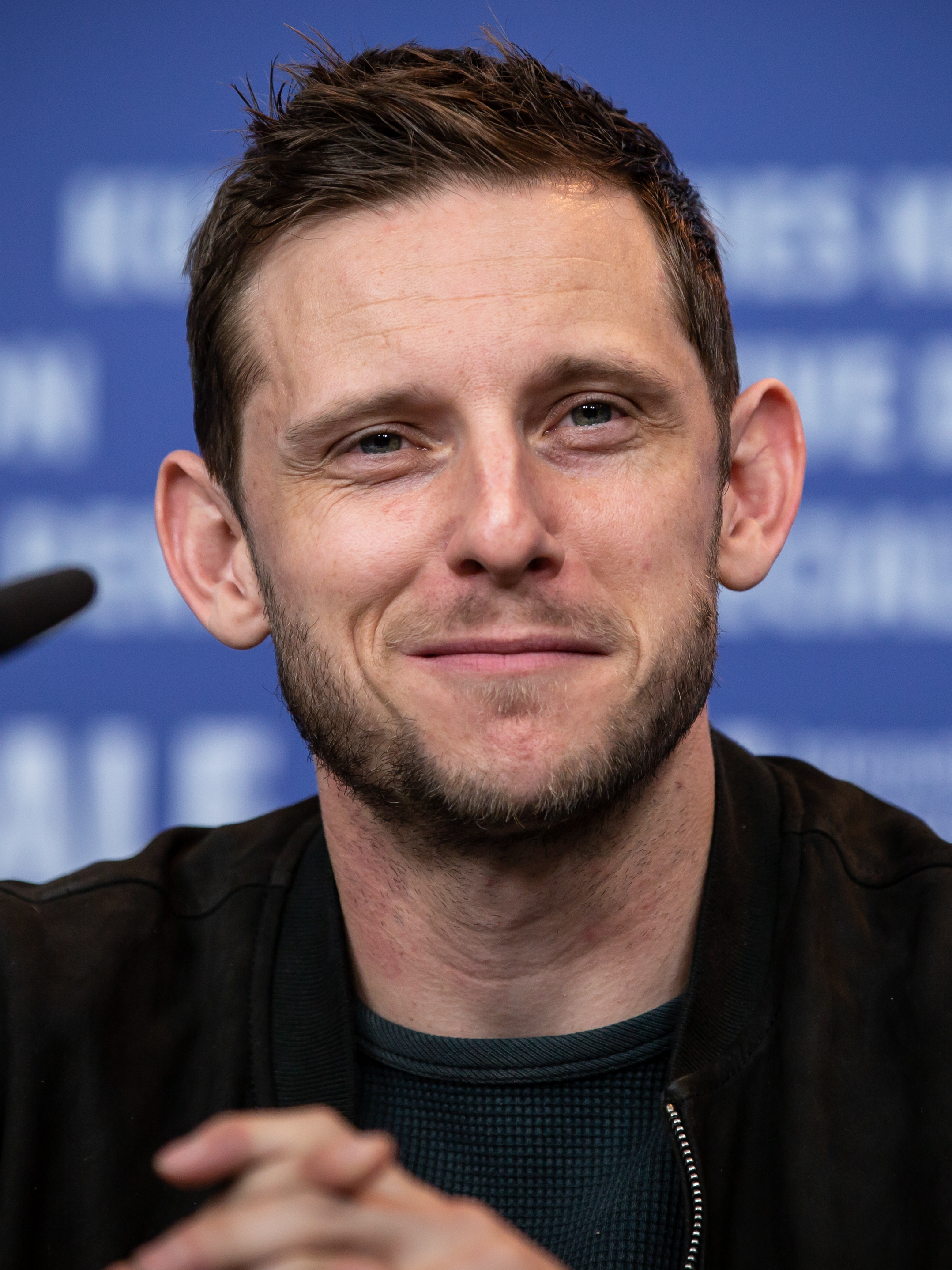
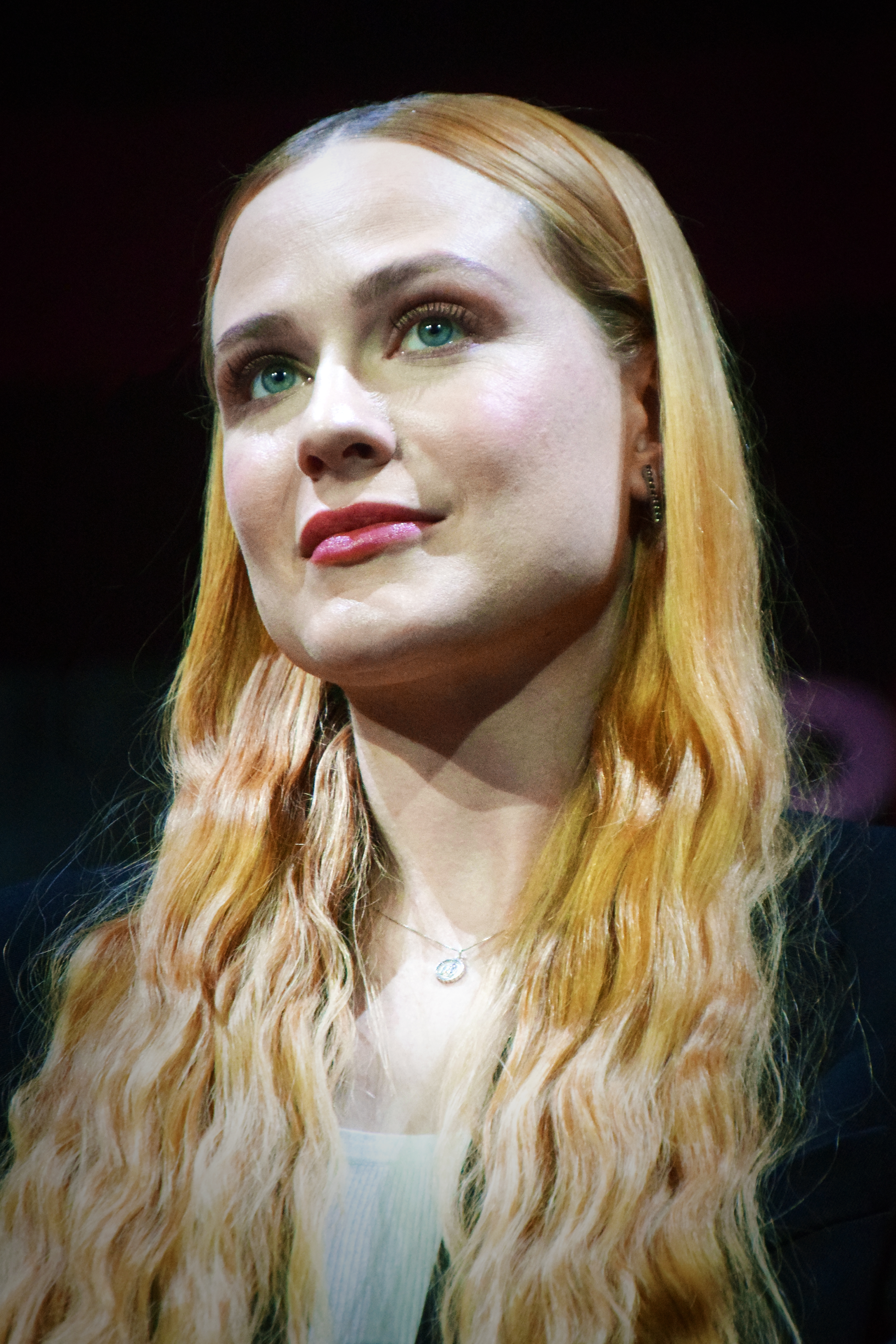
The main characters in the video were played by Jamie Bell (left, pictured in 2019) and Evan Rachel Wood (right, pictured in 2022)

The song's music video was directed by Samuel Bayer, known for directing music videos for Nirvana and Metallica. Bayer envisioned the video as a mini-movie, wanting to create something unlike other music videos that he felt were predictable. Bayer brought the idea of an Iraq War-themed video to the band after interviewing soldiers who had signed up to fight after being persuaded by a television advertisement. Bayer also said that he wanted the music video to be more political than the album's other music videos, saying that he "wanted kids to talk about the war", and felt that MTV had not spread awareness of the conflict and its consequences on soldiers. Although it was not the song's original meaning, Armstrong felt it was appropriate. Bayer and his crew spent a month casting actors for the roles and conducted rehearsals, which was uncommon for music videos. It was filmed in Los Angeles.

The video focuses on a couple in love, played by Jamie Bell and Evan Rachel Wood. The boyfriend promises never to leave his girlfriend but they later argue when the boyfriend enlists in the United States Marine Corps. The boyfriend interprets his actions as a way to show her that he loves her to the point that he would put his life on the line to keep her safe. However, the girlfriend is heartbroken, viewing this as him breaking his vow to never leave her. The video then shows the boyfriend in battle in Iraq being ambushed by insurgents. Despite the Marines fighting back, several of them fall to the ground wounded. This scene is intercut with scenes of the girlfriend tearfully mourning in a quiet field, implying that the boyfriend and some of his squad had been killed in action.

Responses to the music video were generally positive. While its original message of the clip was meant to be anti-war, some interpreted as pro-war. While recognizing the music video's original message, Kelefa Sanneh of the New York Times said that the music video also served as a good "support-our-troops" statement; according to Sarah Boxer, also of the New York Times, the video has been reposted by online bloggers with a caption describing it as a "great recruitment video". Michael Moore of Rolling Stone praised the music video's "authentic" depiction of war, and its effect on soldiers.

It became one of the most requested music videos on MTV, reaching number one on Total Request Live and remaining one of the most popular clips into September 2005. In a 2005 reader poll by Rolling Stone for the best music videos of the year, the clip came in second place, losing to the music video for Gwen Stefani's "Hollaback Girl". Michael Slezak of Entertainment Weekly considered the video to be the second best music video of the year, behind the music video for Destiny's Child's "Girl". In 2019, he later included the clip on his list of the best story-oriented music videos. At the 2006 MTV Video Music Awards, "Wake Me Up When September Ends" was nominated for the Best Rock Video award, but it lost to AFI's "Miss Murder".

== Live performances and other versions ==
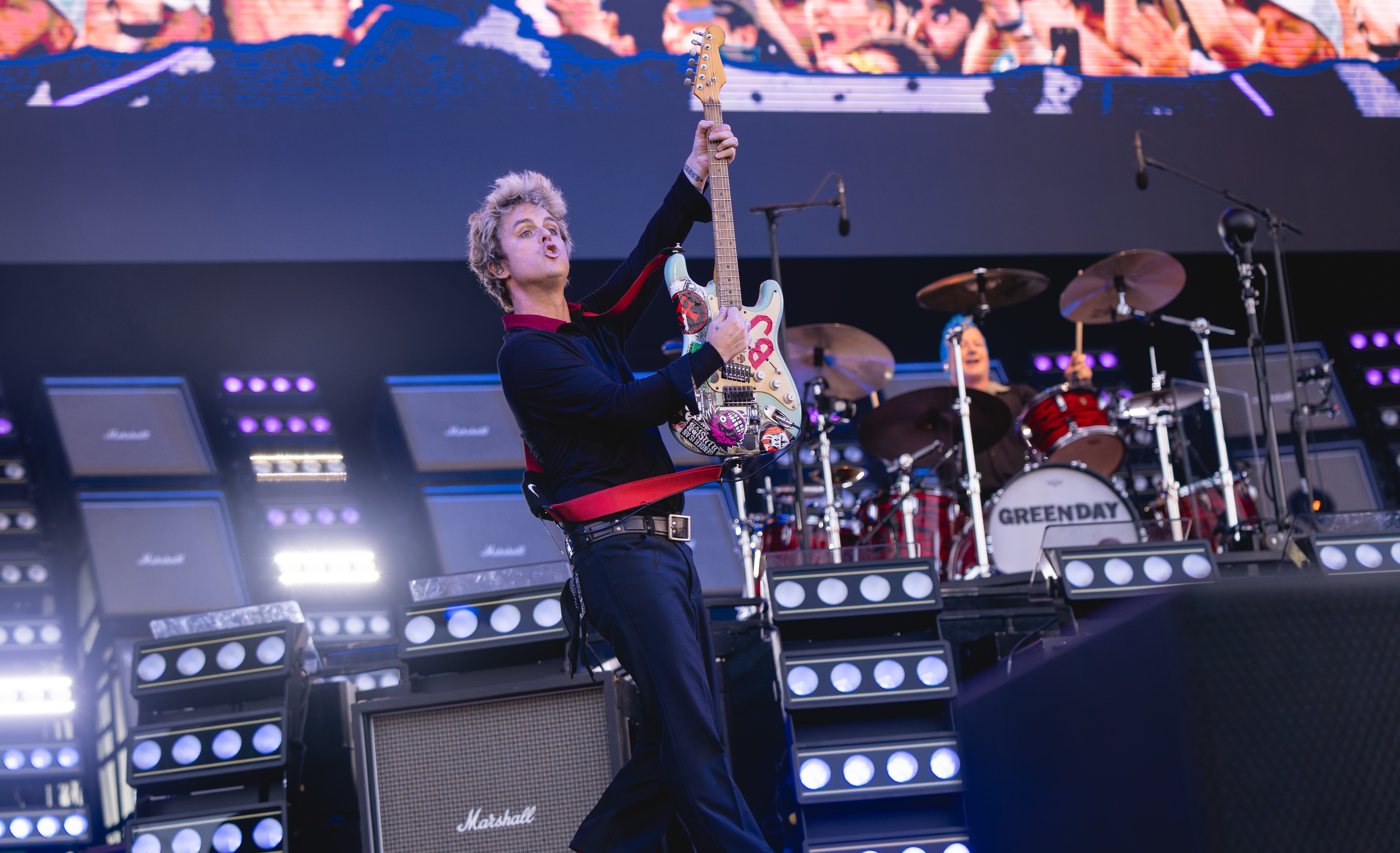
Green Day performing in Manchester in 2024, where the Saviors Tour began.

"Wake Me Up When September Ends" has been included on the set lists of numerous Green Day concert tours. Among these was the set list for the 2010 21st Century Breakdown World Tour, the 2021 Hella Mega Tour, and the 2024 Saviors Tour. Some of these concerts and tours, such as the Saviors Tour, played the song alongside every other track from American Idiot. It was also part of the set list for the band's performance at the When We Were Young festival in 2023. The band performed the song live for the Howard Stern Show in October 2019, alongside an interview with Armstrong discussing the song's origin. Armstrong again performed the song for One World: Together At Home, a charity live stream dedicated to COVID-19 relief efforts hosted by Global Citizen, in April 2020.

In April 2021, Australian singer-songwriter Didirri performed a cover of the song on Like A Version, a weekly segment of Triple J, alongside an original song from one of his recent EPs. A version of the song, covered by Australian pop-punk band With Confidence, was included on American Superhits!, a limited-edition compilation of Green Day song covers released by Kerrang!.

== Legacy ==
"Wake Me Up When September Ends" became closely associated with the aftermath of Hurricane Katrina, which struck the Gulf Coast of the United States three days before the start of September 2005. The association began after a blogger (known as Karmagrrrl) created a video pairing the song with recordings of television coverage of the disaster, which went viral. Sarah Boxer said that while the song's official music video had an ambiguous meaning, the edit created by Karmagrrrl sent a "clear message", though Boxer believed that some of the lyrics did not make sense within the context of the clip. Green Day performed the song for ReAct Now: Music & Relief, a benefit concert dedicated to the victims of the hurricane. A live recording of the song, also dedicated to the victims, was performed at Gillette Stadium and released on September 3. They performed the song again during the pre-game show for a Monday Night Football game played between the New Orleans Saints and the Atlanta Falcons at the New Orleans Superdome. This game was the first to be played at the stadium after the hurricane.

In the years since release, "Wake Me Up When September Ends" has seen popularity spikes on streaming platforms during the first and last days of September, as well as the first day of October. According to Loudwire, its viewership on YouTube increased by 135 percent on the last day of September 2019 compared to the rest of the year's daily average. Consequentially, the band sees increased revenue during those days. The resurgence in popularity around the end of the month also coincides numerous social media posts and internet memes being created, most asking to wake Armstrong up. Many have criticized these memes as insensitive due to the song's context; in response to the memes, Armstrong jokingly said in a 2016 interview with Vulture that he would create a new song titled "Shut The Fuck Up When October Comes". He later referenced the memes in a promotional video released on October 1, 2023, for the then-upcoming song "The American Dream Is Killing Me".

== Personnel ==
Personnel are adapted from the UK CD1 liner notes.

- Green Day – music, production
  - Billie Joe Armstrong – words, lead vocals, guitar
  - Mike Dirnt – bass guitar, backing vocals
  - Tré Cool – drums, African bead gourd
- Rob Cavallo – production
- Doug McKean – engineering
- Chris Lord-Alge – mixing
- Chris Bilheimer – art design

== Charts ==
=== Weekly charts ===
2005–2006 weekly chart performance for "Wake Me Up When September Ends"
Chart (2005–2006)	Peak position
Australia (ARIA)	13
Austria (Ö3 Austria Top 40)	15
Belgium (Ultratip Bubbling Under Flanders)	3
Belgium (Ultratip Bubbling Under Wallonia)	2
Canada CHR/Pop Top 30 (Radio & Records)	4
Canada Hot AC Top 30 (Radio & Records)	3
Canada Rock Top 30 (Radio & Records)	1
CIS Airplay (TopHit)	26
Croatia (HRT)	1
Czech Republic Airplay (ČNS IFPI)	1
Germany (GfK)	22
Germany Airplay (BVMI)	1
Greece (IFPI)	29
Hungary (Rádiós Top 40)	10
Ireland (IRMA)	13
Italy (FIMI)	33
Netherlands (Dutch Top 40)	35
Netherlands (Single Top 100)	44
New Zealand (Recorded Music NZ)	10
Russia Airplay (TopHit)	22
Scottish Singles Sales (Official Charts)	5
Sweden (Sverigetopplistan)	21
Switzerland (Schweizer Hitparade)	22
UK Singles (Official Charts)	8
UK Rock & Metal (Official Charts)	1
US Billboard Hot 100	6
US Adult Alternative Airplay (Billboard)	3
US Adult Contemporary (Billboard)	13
US Adult Pop Airplay (Billboard)	2
US Alternative Airplay (Billboard)	2
US Mainstream Rock Airplay (Billboard)	12
US Pop Airplay (Billboard)	4

2011 weekly chart performance for "Wake Me Up When September Ends"
Chart (2011)	Peak position
UK Rock & Metal (Official Charts)	28

2020 weekly chart performance for "Wake Me Up When September Ends"
Chart (2020)	Peak position
US Alternative Digital Song Sales (Billboard)	8
US Rock Digital Song Sales (Billboard)	7

2023 weekly chart performance for "Wake Me Up When September Ends"
Chart (2023)	Peak position
Japan Hot Overseas (Billboard)	8

=== Year-end charts ===
2005 year-end chart performance for "Wake Me Up When September Ends"
Chart (2005)	Position
Australia (ARIA)	87
Austria (Ö3 Austria Top 40)	72
Brazil (Crowley)	35
Hungary (Rádiós Top 40)	90
UK Singles (OCC)	53
US Billboard Hot 100	46
US Adult Top 40 (Billboard)	41
US Mainstream Top 40 (Billboard)	54
US Modern Rock Tracks (Billboard)	16
US Triple-A (Billboard)	44

2006 year-end chart performance for "Wake Me Up When September Ends"
Chart (2006)	Position
Brazil (Crowley)	38
CIS Airplay (TopHit)	135
Hungary (Rádiós Top 40)	67
Russia Airplay (TopHit)	144
US Adult Top 40 (Billboard)	25

== Certifications ==
Certifications and sales for "Wake Me Up When September Ends"
Region	Certification	Certified units/sales
Canada (Music Canada)	4× Platinum	320,000^{‡}
Denmark (IFPI Danmark)	Platinum	90,000^{‡}
Italy (FIMI)	Platinum	50,000^{‡}
New Zealand (RMNZ)	3× Platinum	90,000^{‡}
Spain (Promusicae)	Gold	30,000^{‡}
United Kingdom (BPI)	2× Platinum	1,200,000^{‡}
United States (RIAA)	Platinum	1,000,000^{*}
^{*} Sales figures based on certification alone.^{‡} Sales+streaming figures based on certification alone.

== Release history ==
Release dates and formats for "Wake Me Up When September Ends"
Region	Date	Format(s)	Label(s)	Ref.
United States	June 13, 2005	Alternative radio	Reprise	
United Kingdom	June 13, 2005	CD	Reprise	
Australia	July 11, 2005	CD	Reprise	
United States	July 11, 2005	Mainstream rock; active rock radio	Reprise	
United States	August 29, 2005	Triple A; contemporary hit radio	Reprise	
