= Jesus of Suburbia =

2005 single by Green Day

Single by Green Day

from the album American Idiot
- Released: November 14, 2005
- Recorded: June 2003
- Genre: Punk rock; pop-punk; emo
- Length: 9:07 (album version); 6:28 (radio edit)
- Label: Reprise; Warner Bros.
- Composer: Green Day
- Lyricist: Billie Joe Armstrong
- Producers: Rob Cavallo; Green Day

Green Day singles chronology
"Wake Me Up When September Ends" (2005)	"Jesus of Suburbia" (2005)	"The Saints Are Coming" (2006)

Music video
- "Jesus of Suburbia (Short Version)" on YouTube

"Jesus of Suburbia" is a song by the American rock band Green Day. It was released as the fifth and final single from the group's seventh studio album, American Idiot (2004), and the second song on the album. With the song running for 9 minutes and 8 seconds, it is Green Day's second longest song (with the band's longest song being fellow American Idiot song "Homecoming", which runs for 9 minutes and 18 seconds) and the group's longest song to be released as a single. The studio version of the song was considered unfriendly for radio, so it was cut down to 6½ minutes for the radio edit. The single has sold 205,000 copies as of July 2010. Despite its commercial success, the song is the only hit single from the American Idiot album not to be included on the band's greatest hits album God's Favorite Band.

== Background ==
"After you write a song like that, it was like, 'I can't turn back now.' You can't all of a sudden say, 'I want to write a normal record."

— Billie Joe Armstrong, Billboard, 2004

American Idiot is a concept album that describes the story of a central character named Jesus of Suburbia, an anti-hero created by Billie Joe Armstrong. It is written from the perspective of a lower-middle-class suburban American teen, raised on a diet of "soda pop and Ritalin". Jesus hates his town and those close to him, so he leaves for The City.

== Composition ==
"Jesus of Suburbia" was the second multi-part song the group formed. Armstrong said it took "a long time" to write the song. Dirnt said that it came about from natural rehearsals between the trio. The song was an extension of Armstrong's desire to write the "Bohemian Rhapsody" of the future. Also, the opening bars of "Jesus of Suburbia", with their guitar-voice call and response structure, seem evocative of David Bowie's "Moonage Daydream".

Because the song changes into different sections, Armstrong's guitars were recorded differently. The musicians would "split the signal from the guitar and send it into an amp while simultaneously going direct with it" to achieve a sound reminiscent of "Revolution" by the Beatles or the style of David Bowie guitarist Mick Ronson. In addition, an overdrive pedal was employed to accentuate gain from the instrument, producing a "punchy" sound to each chord. For the first two sections of the song, Cool emulated Ginger Baker and Charlie Watts, two English drummers from the 1960s. For the final three, he drums in his style: "I'm tipping my hat to all these great drummers that I love, and then I kick the door down and do it... my style." In addition to Watts, Cool pulled inspiration from Keith Moon and Alex Van Halen. The song was composed by Green Day (with Billie Joe Armstrong writing the lyrics), and was co-produced by Rob Cavallo.

"Jesus of Suburbia" has five movements:

1. "Jesus of Suburbia" (0:00 – 1:51)
2. "City of the Damned" (1:51 – 3:42)
3. "I Don't Care" (3:42 – 5:25)
4. "Dearly Beloved" (5:25 – 6:30)
5. "Tales of Another Broken Home" (6:30 – 9:08)

== Music videos ==
Two versions of the "Jesus of Suburbia" music video exist, directed by Samuel Bayer (who also directed the music videos for the first four singles released from the American Idiot album). The official music video premiered on October 14, 2005, in the UK and on October 25, 2005, on the MTV network for viewers in the US. One version is a 12-minute edit, complete with a plot and dialogue; the other is a nine and a half-minute director's cut, inclusive solely of the music itself and devoid of additives. The video starred Lou Taylor Pucci as Jesus. Jesus' love interest was played by Kelli Garner. Jesus' mother was portrayed by Canadian actress Deborah Kara Unger. Although Armstrong was originally tipped to provide the acting role of the main character, this was altered during pre-filming.

The plot of the video essentially follows that of the song. The video pays homage to "1979" by Smashing Pumpkins—it also made use of the SnorriCam which created the video's notable up-close shots in the convenience store and party scenes.

== Critical reception and legacy ==
Since its release, "Jesus of Suburbia" has received universal critical acclaim. People magazine called the song "epic" and a "magnificent nine-minute rock opera". It is often recognized as one of Green Day's greatest songs. It was voted the greatest Green Day song of all time in a Rolling Stone readers poll in September 2012. Magnet considered the song underrated, saying "the five-movement, nine-plus-minute song bobs and weaves its way through standard-issue pop punk ('Jesus of Suburbia'), a piano-laced interlude ('City of the Damned'), the slobbering, thundering middle section ('I Don't Care'), [and] acoustic mid-tempo connective tissue ('Dearly Beloved')."

"Jesus of Suburbia" has been called an "emo anthem". It has also been referred to as the "Bohemian Rhapsody of teen rebellion".

== Live performances ==
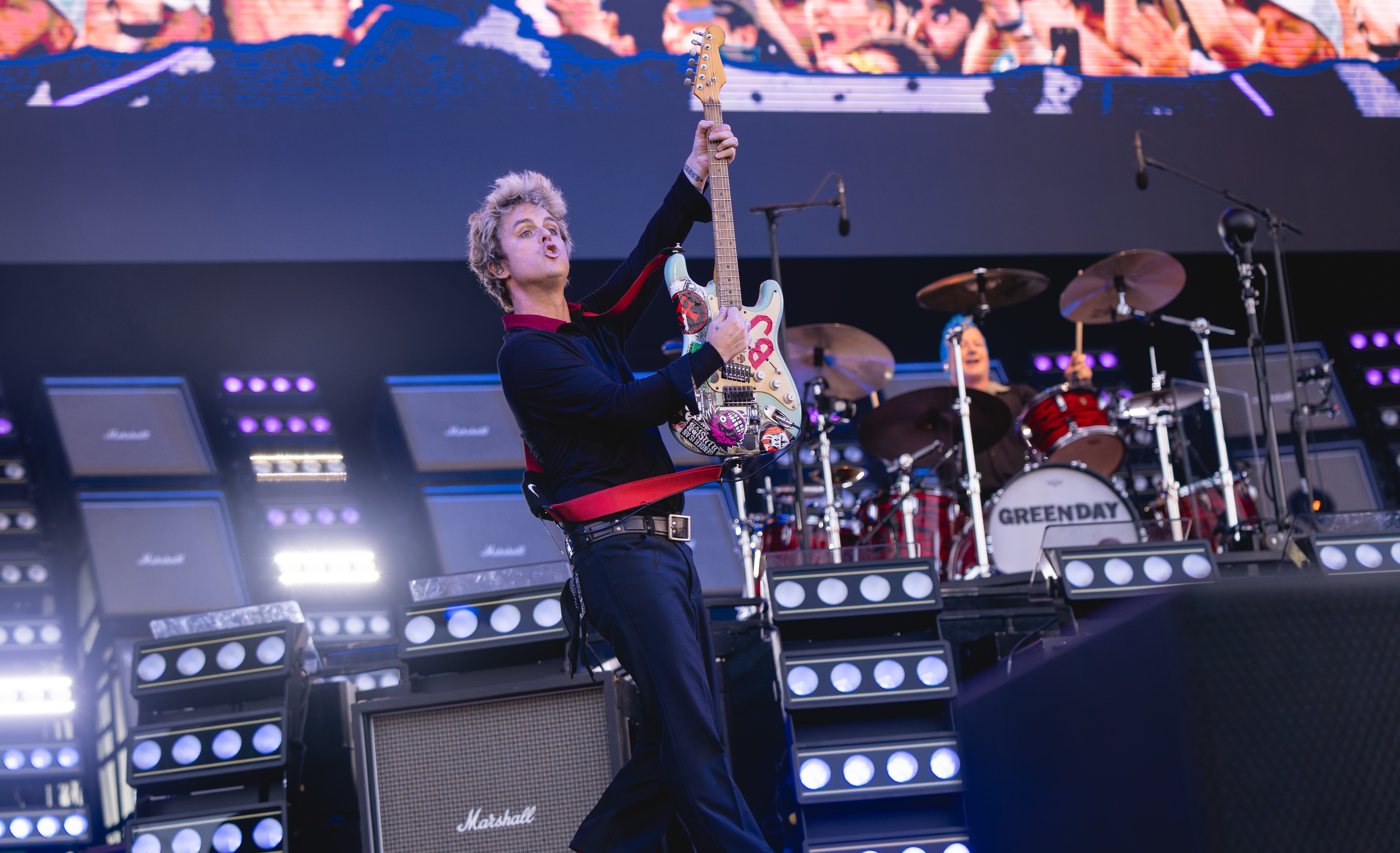
Green Day performing in Manchester in 2024, where the Saviors Tour began

"Jesus of Suburbia" has been included on the set lists of many Green Day concerts, some of which played American Idiot in its entirety to promote the album. The song was included on the set list for the Hella Mega Tour, a concert tour for Green Day as well as Fall Out Boy and Weezer that began in 2021. The song was later included on the set list for the Saviors Tour, alongside every other song from American Idiot.

During performances in late 2024 and early 2025, Armstrong altered song lyrics on multiple occasions. In November 2024, during a performance at the Corona Capital festival in Mexico City, he changed the lyrics "From Anaheim to the Middle East" to "From Palestine to the Middle East", as a way to express solidarity with Palestine amidst the war on Gaza. In March 2025, during a concert in Australia, Armstrong modified the lyrics, first from "From Anaheim to the Middle East" to "From Ukraine to the Middle East", and subsequently from "...am I retarded, or am I just overjoyed?" to "...am I retarded, or am I just J.D. Vance?" Later, on April 12, 2025, at the Coachella Festival in Indio, California, he changed the lyric "Running away from pain when you've been victimized" to "Running away from pain like the kids from Palestine".

== Credits and personnel ==
Personnel is adapted from the UK CD1 liner notes.

- Billie Joe Armstrong – lead vocals, guitar, production
- Mike Dirnt – bass, backing vocals, production
- Tré Cool – drums, production
- Rob Cavallo – production

== Track listings ==
Australian CD single
No.	Title	Length
1.	"Jesus of Suburbia"	9:10
2.	"Are We the Waiting" (Live at VH1 Storytellers, Culver City, California on February 15, 2005)	2:57
3.	"St. Jimmy" (Live at VH1 Storytellers in Culver City, California on February 15, 2005)	3:07

iTunes Single and Cardboard Sleeve CD single
No.	Title	Length
1.	"Jesus of Suburbia"	9:10
2.	"St. Jimmy" (Live at VH1 Storytellers in Culver City, California on February 15, 2005)	3:07

Promo CD
No.	Title	Length
1.	"Jesus of Suburbia"	9:10
2.	"Jesus of Suburbia" (Radio Edit)	6:28

10" Yellow Vinyl

Side A
No.	Title	Length
1.	"Jesus of Suburbia"	9:10

Side B
No.	Title	Length
1.	"St. Jimmy" (Live at VH1 Storytellers, Culver City, California on February 15, 2005)	3:07

DVD Single
No.	Title	Length
1.	"Jesus of Suburbia" (Video)	11:53
2.	"Jesus of Suburbia" (Live Video, Live at Irving Plaza, New York City, New York on September 21, 2004)	11:10
3.	"Bullet in a Bible" (Video Trailer)	2:33

== Charts ==
Chart performance for "Jesus of Suburbia"
Chart (2005–07)	Peak position
Australia (ARIA)	24
Austria (Ö3 Austria Top 40)	55
Canada (Nielsen BDS)	38
Canada Rock Top 30 (Radio & Records)	6
Denmark (Tracklisten)	19
Germany (GfK)	76
Greece (IFPI)	13
Ireland (IRMA)	26
New Zealand (Recorded Music NZ)	26
Scottish Singles Sales (Official Charts)	13
Switzerland (Schweizer Hitparade)	34
UK Singles (Official Charts)	17
UK Rock & Metal (Official Charts)	2
US Alternative Airplay (Billboard)	27

== Certifications ==
Certifications and sales for "Jesus of Suburbia"
Region	Certification	Certified units/sales
Canada (Music Canada)	Platinum	80,000^{‡}
New Zealand (RMNZ)	Gold	15,000^{‡}
United Kingdom (BPI)	Gold	400,000^{‡}
^{‡} Sales+streaming figures based on certification alone.
