= Samuel Bayer =

American film director and director of photography

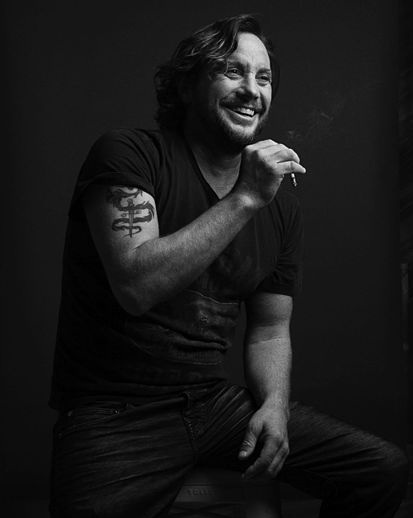
- Bayer in 2013
- Born: Syracuse, New York, U.S.
- Occupations: music video director; commercial director; cinematographer; photographer
- Website: samuelbayer.com

Samuel Bayer is an American music video director, commercial director, cinematographer, and photographer known for directing the videos accompanying "Smells like Teen Spirit" by Nirvana and "No Rain" by Blind Melon. Bayer was born in Syracuse, New York. His brother is comic books illustrator and drawing teacher Josh Bayer. He graduated from New York City's School of Visual Arts in 1987 with a degree in Fine Arts. Originally studying to be a painter, he relocated to Los Angeles in 1991.

== Career ==
Bayer's work includes Nirvana's music video for "Smells Like Teen Spirit", Blind Melon's "No Rain" video as well as award-winning commercials for brands like Chrysler, Nike, and Coca-Cola.

In addition to Nirvana and Blind Melon, Bayer has shot and directed videos for David Bowie, the Rolling Stones, Ozzy Osbourne, Pat Benatar, Ramones, Iron Maiden, Metallica, the Jesus and Mary Chain, Melissa Etheridge, Green Day, the Smashing Pumpkins, the Cranberries, Justin Timberlake, Blink-182, Papa Roach, Garbage, Maroon 5, Good Charlotte, and My Chemical Romance, among others. Bayer has won seven MTV Video Music Awards including Video of the Year in 2005 as well as Best Direction in 2005 and 2007.

In 1996, his Nike commercial, "If You Let Me Play", won an Association of Independent Commercial Producers Award for Best Direction. In 2011, his Super Bowl spot for Chrysler, "Born of Fire", which featured Eminem, received multiple awards, including an Emmy and a Cannes Gold Lion.

New Line Cinema and Platinum Dunes selected Bayer to direct their remake of A Nightmare on Elm Street. With a production budget of $35 million, the film held the number-one spot at the US box office in its first week in April 2010. The film starred Academy Award nominee Jackie Earle Haley and introduced Rooney Mara in her first major studio role.

== Music videography ==
- Asphalt Ballet – "Soul Survive" (1991)
- Nirvana – "Smells Like Teen Spirit" (1991)
- Ozzy Osbourne – "Mama, I'm Coming Home" (1991)
- The Candyskins – "For What It's Worth" (1991)
- Immaculate Fools – "Stand Down" (1992)
- The Scream – "Father, Mother, Son" (1992)
- Asphalt Ballet – "Tuesday's Rain" (1992)
- Asphalt Ballet – "Unlucky Mr. Lucky" (1992)
- Richie Sambora – "One Light Burning" (1992)
- Tesla – "What You Give" (1992)
- Iron Maiden – "Wasting Love" (1992)
- Ramones – "Poison Heart" (1992)
- Suicidal Tendencies – "Nobody Hears" (1992)
- Public Image Ltd – "Covered" (1992)
- The Wonder Stuff – "On the Ropes" (1992)
- John Lee Hooker – "This Is Hip" (1992)
- The Jesus and Mary Chain – "Far Gone and Out" (1992)
- The Jesus and Mary Chain – "Almost Gold" (1992)
- Robbie Robertson – "Go Back to Your Woods" (1992)
- Rise Robots Rise – "If I Only Knew" (1992)
- Grayson Hugh – "Soul Cat Girl" (1992)
- The Quireboys – "Brother Louie" (1993)
- Pat Benatar – "Somebody's Baby" (1993)
- Blind Melon – "No Rain" (1993)
- Blind Melon – "Tones of Home" (version 2) (1993)
- Melissa Etheridge – "Come to My Window" (1993)
- Candlebox – "You" (1993)
- Drivin N Cryin – "Smoke" (1993)
- Rush – "Stick It Out" (1993)
- Buffalo Tom – "I'm Allowed" (1993)
- The Charlatans – "I Don't Want to See the Sights" (1993)
- The Charlatans – "Weirdo" (1993)
- NOFX – "Bob" (1993)
- Sybil Vane – "Pixy" (1994)
- Corrosion of Conformity – "Albatross" (1994)
- The Devlins – "Someone to Talk To" (1994)
- Fishbone – "Unyielding Conditioning" (1994)
- Fishbone – "Servitude" (1994)
- Tears for Fears – "Elemental" (1994)
- Blind Melon – "Change" (1994)
- Toad the Wet Sprocket – "Fall Down" (1994)
- Collective Soul – "Breathe" (1994)
- The Cranberries – "Zombie" (1994)
- Hole – "Doll Parts" (1994)
- Eve's Plum – "Die Like Someone" (1994)
- The Cranberries – "Ode to My Family" (1994)
- The Offspring – "Gotta Get Away" (1995)
- All – "Million Bucks" (1995)
- The Cult – "Star" (1995)
- The Cranberries – "I Can't Be with You" (1995)
- The Cranberries – "Ridiculous Thoughts" (1995)
- John Lee Hooker – "Chill Out" (1995)
- The The – "I Saw the Light" (1995)
- Melissa Etheridge – "If I Wanted To" (1995)
- Garbage – "Vow" (1995)
- Urge Overkill – "The Break" (1995)
- The Smashing Pumpkins – "Bullet with Butterfly Wings" (1995)
- David Bowie – "The Hearts Filthy Lesson" (1995)
- David Bowie – "Strangers When We Meet" (1995)
- Garbage – "Only Happy When It Rains" (1996)
- Garbage – "Stupid Girl" (1996)
- Metallica – "Until It Sleeps" (1996)
- Local H – "Bound for the Floor" (1996)
- The Afghan Whigs – "Honky's Ladder" (1996)
- John Mellencamp – "Just Another Day" (1996)
- Cracker – "I Hate My Generation" (1996)
- Cracker – "Nothing to Believe In" (1996)
- The Rolling Stones – "Anybody Seen My Baby?" (1997)
- Sheryl Crow – "Home" (1997)
- LL Cool J – "Father" (1998)
- The Rolling Stones – "Saint of Me" (1998)
- Sheryl Crow – "My Favorite Mistake" (1998)
- John Mellencamp – "Your Life Is Now" (1998)
- Everlast – "Ends" (1999)
- Marilyn Manson – "Rock Is Dead" (1999)
- Marilyn Manson – "Coma White" (1999)
- Natalie Imbruglia – "Identify" (1999)
- Lenny Kravitz – "Black Velveteen" (2000)
- Marilyn Manson – "Disposable Teens" (2000)
- Pete Yorn – "Life on a Chain" (2001)
- Blink-182 – "Stay Together for the Kids" (2001)
- Aerosmith – "Sunshine" (2001)
- Lenny Kravitz – "Dig In" (2001)
- Papa Roach – "Time and Time Again" (2002)
- Good Charlotte – "Hold On" (uncredited) (2003)
- Green Day – "American Idiot" (2004)
- Green Day – "Boulevard of Broken Dreams" (2004)
- Green Day – "Holiday" (2005)
- Green Day – "Wake Me Up When September Ends" (2005)
- Green Day – "Jesus of Suburbia" (2005)
- Green Day – Bullet in a Bible (live concert DVD) (2005)
- The Strokes – "Heart in a Cage" (2006)
- The Strokes – "You Only Live Once" (2006)
- My Chemical Romance – "Welcome to the Black Parade" (2006)
- My Chemical Romance – "Famous Last Words" (2006)
- Justin Timberlake – "What Goes Around... Comes Around" (2007)
- Good Charlotte – "Keep Your Hands off My Girl" (2007); (as cinematographer)
- Green Day – "Working Class Hero" (2007)
- Maroon 5 featuring Wiz Khalifa – "Payphone" (2012)
- Green Day – "Oh Love" (2012)
- Green Day – "Kill the DJ" (2012)
- Michael Jackson – "A Place with No Name" (2014)
- Maroon 5 – "Animals" (2014)
- Jesse & Joy – "Ecos de Amor" (2015)
- Garbage – "Empty" (2016)
- Mudcrutch – "I Forgive It All" (2016); (with Sean Penn)
- The Avett Brothers – “This Land is Your Land” (2020)
- The Offspring – "This Is Not Utopia" (2021)
- Pearl Jam – "Quick Escape" (2022)
- DivaGurl ft. Keke Palmer - "Rock With You" (2024)
- Kid Cudi – "Grave" (2025)

== Commercials ==
- 7 Up, "Vendor"
- Acura, "Pilots", "Prints", "Zero G's", "Snow"
- Adidas, "Crazy Light"
- AMD K6, "Truck", "Train"
- Ameriquest Mortgage, "Surf", "Push"
- AT&T, "On the Go", "trip.com", "hollywood.com", "mapquest.com", "tdwaterhouse.com", "Faces"
- Audi, "Road to Greatness"
- Bank of America, "Veterans' Legacy"
- Blue Shield, "Tough"
- BMW, "xDrive", "F32/When Does It Start?"
- British Knights, "Derrick's Nightmare"
- Bud Light, "Voodoo", "Lucky Chair"
- Budweiser Black Crown, "Coronation", "Celebration"
- Buick, "Envision"
- Burger King, "Cute"
- BYD, "Letter to Leonardo", "Make History"
- Cadillac, "Let's Dance"
- Capitalia, "The Last War"
- Charter, "Love", "Body Language", "Birds and Turtles", "Webcam", "Bedtime", "Faces"
- Chevrolet, "Minotaur", "Yup", "Names"
- Chrysler, "Sprinkler", "The Natural", "Born of Fire", "The Kings and Queens of America"
- Cigna, "True You"
- Cingular, "Dancing Josh", "Smile", "Southern Opera", "Guitar", "Seurat", "Best Friend", "Emoticon", "Tap Dancer"
- Citroën, "DS5"
- Coca-Cola, "Eat Sleep Drink", "Eat Sleep Drink Brazil", "Ice Dancer"
- Converse, "Live Free or Die", "From Robbins, Illinois"
- Coors, "Early"
- CORE, "Guardians"
- Dell, "Slap"
- Dodge, "Wisdom", "Rumble of Dodges", "Family Reunion", "Answer the Call"
- Domino's Pizza, "Gotham Delivery"
- Drug Free America Foundation, "Block Family"
- EA Sports, "You"
- General Electric, "Model Miners"
- Intel, "Experience Amazing"
- Jawbone, "Boo Boo", "Soup de Jour", "Medium F***ing Starch"
- Jeep, "Shakey Town", "Free to Be"
- Kia Cadenza, "Impossible to Ignore", "Luxury Feature"
- Lexus, "Long Live the King"
- M&M's, "Color"
- Microsoft/Intel, "Digital Joy"
- Mitsubishi, "Drums", "Respect"

| class="col-break col-break-2" |

- Moët Hennessy USA, "L'Ascenseur"
- Mountain Dew, "Thank Heaven", "Parking Attendant", "Mock Opera", "Showstopper", "Animated", "Back to School", "No Academics", "Sled", "Rebel Spirit"
- Nike, "If You Let Me Play", "Anthem", "Long Time Coming"
- Nikon, "Picturetown"
- Nissan, "Chase", "Foundry", "Pilot's Dream", "UFO", "Steeple Chase", "Astronaut's Dream", "Polo", "Best In Class", "Towing with Dodge", "Shift Titan", "4x4", "Cargo", "Singing Its Praise"
- Packard Bell, "Home"
- Pepsi, "Summer Job", "Tailgating", "I Fought the Law", "Beachball"
- Pepsi Blue, "Slam Poet", "Car Stereo"
- Porsche, "School's Out"
- Reebok, "Emotions", "Clones", "Discovery", "Girl Inspired"
- Sierra Mist, "Glacier", "Esther", "Boxers", "Pull"
- Sony, "Walk This Way"
- Spice Girls, "Pepsi Commercial"
- Universal Orlando, "Call All Heroes"
- US Army, "Army Strong"
- US Navy, "Spotlight"
- Verizon IndyCar Series, "Greatness", "Perspective"
- Volkswagen, "Megaphone", "Honk"
- Volvo, "Car Wash", "Saturday"

== Filmography ==
- A Nightmare on Elm Street (2010) (director)

== Unrealized projects ==
Bayer had been attached to direct various different films over the years such as:

- Monster's Ball
- Get Carter, the 2000 remake starring Sylvester Stallone
- A cancelled remake of Bring Me the Head of Alfredo Garcia starring Benicio del Toro
- A cancelled remake of Vanishing Point for Scott Free Productions
- The Amityville Horror, Friday the 13th, and The Texas Chainsaw Massacre: The Beginning were all turned down by him.
- A cancelled remake of Near Dark for Platinum Dunes
- Black Water Transit
- Brilliance, a heist film starring Scarlett Johansson
- The Boys, based on the comic book. He expressed interest in directing the film adaptation.
- Tumor, based on the graphic novel
- Icarus Rises, an original premise that he developed for a decade. A proof of concept trailer was released in 2017.

== Photography ==
On March 3, 2013, Bayer opened his first major solo exhibition at ACE Gallery Beverly Hills entitled, "Diptychs & Triptychs". Bayer presented a series of sixteen twelve-foot-tall, female nude triptychs as well as four ten-foot-tall diptych portraits. In an Interview magazine article, Bayer commented that "the initial effect of the portraits are overwhelming, and a bit spooky."

In 2014, at the Sean Penn & Friends Help Haiti Home Gala sponsored by Giorgio Armani, Bayer debuted a series of photographs that were portraits and documentary of life in the tent camps

Bayer spoke about shooting celebrities in an Interview Magazine piece called "Samuel Bayer's American Image". In it, he mentions working with David Bowie, saying, "When I worked with Bowie [on “The Heart’s Filthy Lesson“], Interview magazine came down to the set and printed a bunch of stuff from the shoot. That was one of my favorite people. Working with Bowie was amazing. I wish they were all like that."

== Accolades ==
=== Music videos ===
- 1992 MTV Video Music Award – Best Alternative Video – Nirvana: "Smells Like Teen Spirit"
- 1996 MTV Video Music Award – Best Rock Video – Metallica: "Until It Sleeps"
- 2005 MTV Video Music Award – Video of the Year – Green Day: "Boulevard of Broken Dreams"
- 2005 MTV Video Music Award – Best Direction in a Video – Green Day: "Boulevard of Broken Dreams"
- 2005 MTV Video Music Award – Best Cinematography – Green Day: "Boulevard of Broken Dreams"
- 2005 MTV Video Music Award – Viewer's Choice – Green Day: “American Idiot"
- 2005 Music Video Production Association Award – Best Rock Video of the Year – Green Day: "Boulevard of Broken Dreams"
- 2005 Music Video Production Association Award – Best Cinematography – Green Day: "Boulevard of Broken Dreams"
- 2005 Kodak – Salute to Music Video Cinematography – Green Day: "Boulevard of Broken Dreams"
- 2005 Kodak Lifetime Achievement Award – Excellence in Cinematography – Music Video
- 2006 Music Video Production Association Award – Lifetime Achievement Award
- 2006 MuchMusic Video Award – Best International Video Group – Green Day: "Wake Me Up When September Ends"
- 2007 MuchMusic Video Award – Best International Video Group – My Chemical Romance: "Welcome to the Black Parade"
- 2007 MTV Video Music Award – Best Direction – Justin Timberlake: "What Goes Around... Comes Around"
- 2013 Camerimage — Lifetime Achievement in Music Videos

=== Commercials ===
- 1996 AICP Show – Direction & Dialogue or Monologue – Nike: "If You Let Me Play"
- 1996 International Andy Awards – Nike: "If You Let Me Play"
- 1997 AICP Show – Cinematography, Direction and Production Design – Packard Bell: "Home"
- 1998 AICP Show – Production – Mountain Dew: "Thank Heaven"
- 1999 AICP Show – Production – Reebok: "Clones", Mountain Dew: "Parking"
- 2001 Clio Television & Cinema – Direction – Mountain Dew: "Showstopper"
- 2005 AICP Show – Production – Mountain Dew: "Iditarod"
- 2011 AICP Show – Editorial – Chrysler: "Born of Fire"
- 2011 Emmy Award – Outstanding Commercial – Chrysler: "Born of Fire"
- 2011 Cannes Gold Lion, Film Craft – Direction – Chrysler: "Born of Fire"
- 2011 International Andy Awards – TV: Spot Over 30s – Chrysler: "Born of Fire"

=== Film ===
- 2011 People's Choice Awards – Favorite Horror Movie – A Nightmare on Elm Street
