= List of awards and nominations received by the Killers =

The Killers awards and nominations
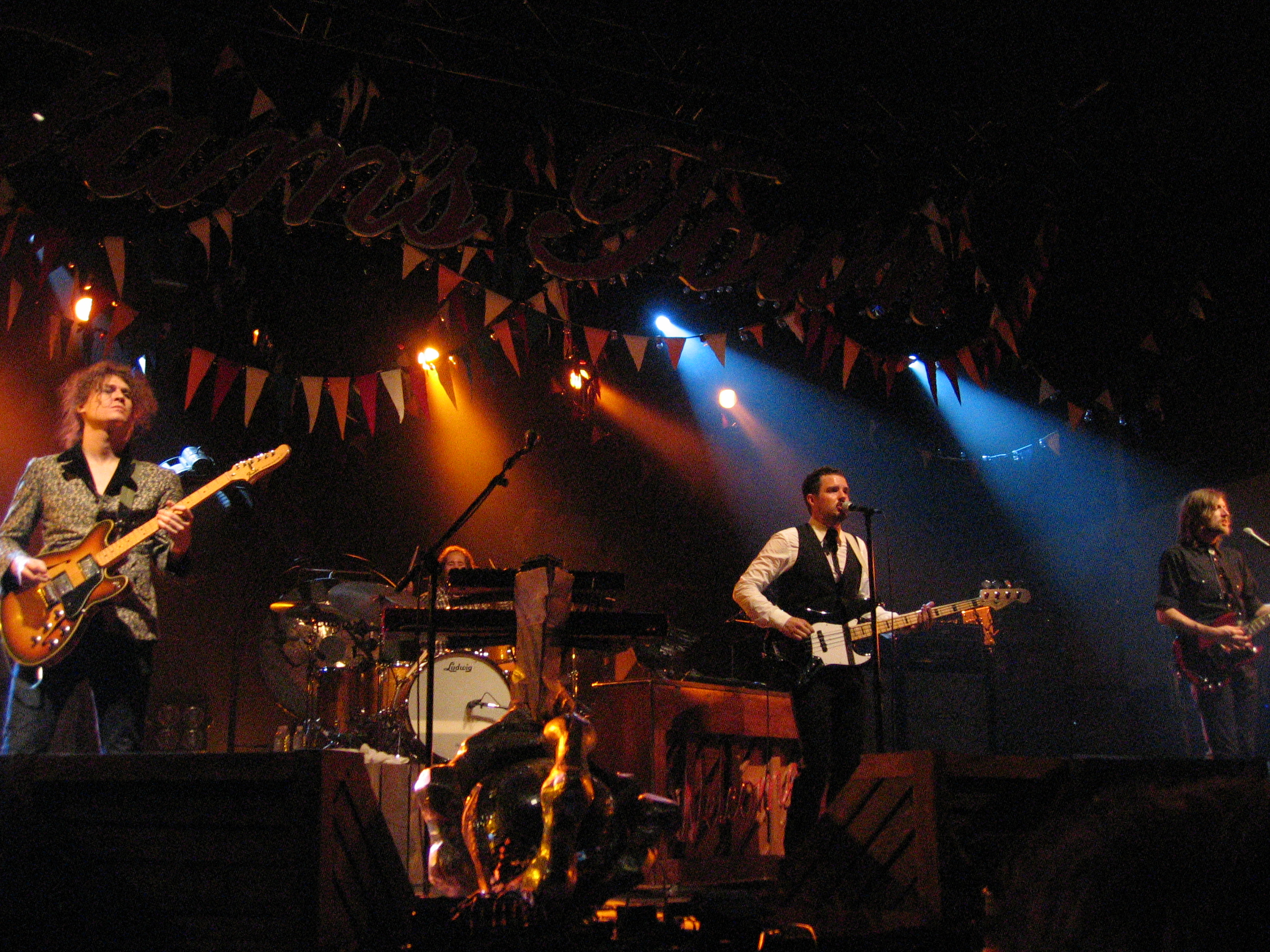
Awards and nominations
| Award | Wins | Nominations |
| AltRock Awards | 1 | 3 |
| American Music Awards | 0 | 1 |
| ASCAP Awards | 1 | 1 |
| Billboard Music Awards | 0 | 3 |
| BRIT Awards | 2 | 8 |
| Esky Music Awards | 1 | 1 |
| Grammy Awards | 0 | 7 |
| International Dance Music Awards | 3 | 7 |
| Meteor Ireland Music Awards | 1 | 9 |
| MTV Australia Awards | 1 | 2 |
| MTV Europe Music Awards | 2 | 7 |
| MTV Video Music Awards | 1 | 7 |
| mtvU Woodie Awards | 1 | 1 |
| MuchMusic Video Awards | 1 | 5 |
| MVPA Awards | 1 | 1 |
| NARM Awards | 1 | 1 |
| NME Awards | 7 | 24 |
| NME USA Awards | 2 | 5 |
| NRJ Music Awards | 0 | 1 |
| People's Choice Awards | 0 | 1 |
| Premios 40 Principales | 0 | 1 |
| Q Awards | 1 | 7 |
| Shortlist Music Prize | 0 | 1 |
| TEC Awards | 0 | 1 |
| UK Festival Awards | 2 | 3 |
| World Music Awards | 1 | 2 |

Totals (Note: Certain award groups do not simply award one winner. They acknowledge several different recipients, have runners-up, and have third place. Since this is a specific recognition and is different from losing an award, runner-up mentions are considered wins in this award tally. For simplification and to avoid errors, each award in this list has been presumed to have had a prior nomination.)
- Wins: 32
- Nominations: 109

The Killers are an American rock band from Las Vegas, Nevada. After forming in late 2001 when Dave Keuning's advertisement in a music paper was answered by Brandon Flowers, Mark Stoermer and Ronnie Vannucci Jr., a Warner Bros. employee recommended them to Lizard King Records, who signed them. The band consequently went to England to record their 2004 debut album Hot Fuss, which earned them five nominations at the Grammy Awards and has sold over 5,000,000 copies.

Their second album, Sam's Town earned the band the BRIT Awards Best International Album at the 2007 BRIT Awards and two nominations at the Grammy Awards. The band's third studio album, Day & Age, was nominated for Best International Album at the BRIT Awards and was twice nominated at the 2009 NME Awards where the group won Best International Band. The fourth studio album, Battle Born, was released concurrent to the band winning its fourth NME Award for Best International Band. Fifth studio album, Wonderful Wonderful earned the band a fourth Brit Awards nomination for Best International Group.

== AltRock Awards ==
The AltRock Award is presented annually by the American radio station i99Radio.

| Year | Nominee / work | Award | Result |
|---|---|---|---|
| 2018 | The Killers | Artist of the Year | Nominated |
| 2018 | Wonderful Wonderful | Album of the Year | Won |
| 2018 | Brandon Flowers | Best Male Singer | Nominated |

== American Music Awards ==
Created by Dick Clark in 1973, the American Music Awards is an annual music awards ceremony and one of several major annual American music awards shows.

| Year | Nominated work | Award | Result |
|---|---|---|---|
| 2005 | The Killers | New Artist of the Year | Nominated |

== ASCAP Awards ==
The annual ASCAP Awards honor its top members and songwriters. ASCAP is a US based performance rights organization. The Killers received their highest honor for a group for their musical genre's "impact on the future of American music".

| Year | Nominated work | Award | Result |
|---|---|---|---|
| 2010 | The Killers | Vanguard Award | Won |

== Billboard Music Awards ==
The Billboard Music Awards are an annual awards show from Billboard Magazine. The awards are based on sales data by Nielsen SoundScan and radio information by Nielsen Broadcast Data Systems.

| Year | Nominated work | Award | Result |
|---|---|---|---|
| 2005 | "Mr. Brightside" | Digital Song of the Year | Nominated |
| 2005 | The Killers | Group of the Year | Nominated |
| 2005 | The Killers | Modern Rock Artist of the Year | Nominated |

== Brit Awards ==
The Brit Awards are the British Phonographic Industry's annual pop music awards. The Killers have won two awards from seven nominations.

| Year | Nominated work | Award | Result |
|---|---|---|---|
| 2005 | The Killers | International Breakthrough Act | Nominated |
| 2005 | Hot Fuss | International Album | Nominated |
| 2007 | The Killers | International Group | Won |
| 2007 | Sam's Town | International Album | Won |
| 2009 | The Killers | International Group | Nominated |
| 2009 | Day & Age | International Album | Nominated |
| 2013 | The Killers | International Group | Nominated |
| 2018 | The Killers | International Group | Nominated |

== Esky Music Awards ==
The Esky Music Awards are awarded annually by Esquire, a men's magazine by the Hearst Corporation.

| Year | Nominated work | Award | Result |
|---|---|---|---|
| 2005 | The Killers | Best Rookies | Won |

== Grammy Awards ==
The Grammy Awards are awarded annually by the National Academy of Recording Arts and Sciences. The Killers have been nominated seven times.

| Year | Nominated work | Award | Result |
|---|---|---|---|
| 2005 | Hot Fuss | Best Rock Album | Nominated |
| 2005 | "Somebody Told Me" | Best Rock Song | Nominated |
| 2005 | "Somebody Told Me" | Best Rock Performance by a Duo or Group with Vocal | Nominated |
| 2006 | "Mr. Brightside" | Best Pop Performance by a Duo or Group with Vocal | Nominated |
| 2006 | "All These Things That I've Done" | Best Rock Performance by a Duo or Group with Vocal | Nominated |
| 2007 | "When You Were Young" | Best Rock Song | Nominated |
| 2007 | "When You Were Young" | Best Short Form Music Video | Nominated |

Jacques Lu Cont's "Thin White Duke Remix" of "Mr. Brightside" also received a nomination in 2006 for Best Remixed Recording, Non-Classical.

== Guild of Music Supervisors Awards ==
| Year | Nominated work | Award | Result |
|---|---|---|---|
| 2019 | "All These Things That I've Done" | Best Song Written and/or Recorded for Television | Nominated |

== Ibiza Music Video Festival ==
Ibiza Music Video Festival is the online music video competition. Rupert Bryan and Elizabeth Fear founded the event in 2013.

| Year | Nominee / work | Award | Result |
|---|---|---|---|
| 2017 | "The Man" | Best DOP | Nominated |
| 2017 | "The Man" | Best Costume | Nominated |

== International Dance Music Awards ==
The International Dance Music Awards are an annual awards show honoring dance and electronic artists and are distributed by the Winter Music Conference.

| Year | Nominated work | Award | Result |
|---|---|---|---|
| 2005 | "Somebody Told Me" | Best Alternative/Rock Dance Track | Won |
| 2006 | "Mr. Brightside" | Best Alternative/Rock Dance Track | Won |
| 2006 | The Killers | Best Dance Artist (Group) | Nominated |
| 2008 | "Read My Mind" | Best Alternative/Rock Dance Track | Nominated |
| 2008 | The Killers | Best Dance Artist (Group) | Nominated |
| 2009 | "Human" | Best Alternative/Rock Dance Track | Won |
| 2010 | Day & Age | Best Artist Album | Nominated |

== Meteor Ireland Music Awards ==
The Meteor Music Awards are Ireland's national music awards. The Killers have won one award from nine nominations.

| Year | Nominated work | Award | Result |
|---|---|---|---|
| 2005 | The Killers | Best International Group | Nominated |
| 2005 | The Killers | Best Live Performance Visiting Act | Won |
| 2005 | Hot Fuss | Best International Album | Nominated |
| 2007 | The Killers | Best International Group | Nominated |
| 2007 | Sam's Town | Best International Album | Nominated |
| 2008 | The Killers | Best International Group | Nominated |
| 2009 | The Killers | Best International Group | Nominated |
| 2009 | The Killers | Best International Live Performance | Nominated |
| 2009 | Day & Age | Best International Album | Nominated |

== MTV ==
=== MTV Australia Awards ===
The MTV Australia Awards (previously known as the MTV Australia Video Music Awards or AVMAs) started in 2005, where Australia celebrates both local and international acts.

| Year | Nominated work | Award | Result |
|---|---|---|---|
| 2007 | Sam's Town | Album of the Year | Won |
| 2009 | Human | Best Rock Video | Nominated |

=== MTV Europe Music Awards ===
The MTV Europe Music Awards were established in 1994 by MTV Europe to celebrate the most popular music videos in Europe.

| Year | Nominated work | Award | Result |
|---|---|---|---|
| 2006 | The Killers | Best Rock Act | Won |
| 2009 | The Killers | Best Alternative Act | Nominated |
| 2012 | The Killers | Best Rock Act | Nominated |
| 2013 | The Killers | Best Rock Act | Nominated |
| 2013 | The Killers | Best World Stage (WS Big Day Out 2013) | Nominated |
| 2014 | The Killers | Best World Stage (MTV World Stage Live in Amsterdam) | Nominated |
| 2017 | The Killers | Best Rock Act | Nominated |
| 2020 | The Killers | Best Rock | Nominated |
| 2021 | The Killers | Best Rock | Nominated |
| 2022 | The Killers | Best Rock | Nominated |
| 2023 | The Killers | Best Rock | Nominated |

=== MTV Video Music Awards ===
The MTV Video Music Awards were established in 1984 by MTV to celebrate the top music videos of the year.

| Year | Nominated work | Award | Result |
|---|---|---|---|
| 2005 | "Mr. Brightside" | Best New Artist in a Video | Won |
| 2005 | "Mr. Brightside" | Best Rock Video | Nominated |
| 2005 | "Mr. Brightside" | Best Group Video | Nominated |
| 2005 | "Mr. Brightside" | Best Art Direction in a Video | Nominated |
| 2019 | "Land of the Free" | Video for Good | Nominated |
| 2020 | "Caution" | Best Rock | Nominated |
| 2021 | "My Own Soul's Warning" | Best Rock | Nominated |

=== mtvU Woodie Awards ===
The mtvU Woodie Awards are awarded annually in recognition of "the music voted best by college students".

| Year | Nominated work | Award | Result |
|---|---|---|---|
| 2004 | The Killers | The Breaking Woodie (Best Emerging Artist) | Won |

== MuchMusic Video Awards ==
The MuchMusic Video Awards is an annual awards ceremony honoring the best music videos of Canadian artists.

| Year | Nominated work | Award | Result |
|---|---|---|---|
| 2005 | The Killers | People's Choice: Favorite International Group | Nominated |
| 2005 | "Mr. Brightside" | Best International Video - Group | Won |
| 2007 | The Killers | People's Choice: Favorite International Group | Nominated |
| 2007 | "When You Were Young" | Best International Video - Group | Nominated |
| 2009 | "Human" | Best International Video - Group | Nominated |

== Music Video Production Awards ==
The MVPA Awards are annually presented by a Los Angeles-based music trade organization to honor the year's best music videos.

| Year | Nominated work | Award | Result |
|---|---|---|---|
| 2013 | "Miss Atomic Bomb" | Best Animated Video | Won |

== NARM Awards ==
The NARM Awards are presented annually by the National Association of Recording Merchandisers.

| Year | Nominated work | Award | Result |
|---|---|---|---|
| 2005 | The Killers | Pop/Rock Breakout Artist of the Year | Won |

== NME ==
=== NME Awards UK ===
Founded by the music magazine NME, the NME Awards are awarded annually. The Killers have won seven awards from twenty-four nominations.

| Year | Nominated work | Award | Result |
|---|---|---|---|
| 2005 | The Killers | Best New Band | Nominated |
| 2005 | The Killers | Best International Band | Won |
| 2005 | Brandon Flowers | Sexiest Man | Won |
| 2005 | Brandon Flowers | Best Dressed Man | Won |
| 2006 | The Killers | Best International Band | Nominated |
| 2006 | Brandon Flowers | Best Dressed Man | Nominated |
| 2007 | The Killers | Best International Band | Nominated |
| 2007 | Sam's Town | Best Album | Nominated |
| 2007 | "When You Were Young" | Best Track | Nominated |
| 2007 | "Bones" | Best Video | Won |
| 2007 | Brandon Flowers | Sexiest Man | Nominated |
| 2007 | Brandon Flowers | Best Dressed Man | Nominated |
| 2008 | The Killers | Best International Band | Won |
| 2008 | Sawdust | Best Album Artwork | Nominated |
| 2009 | The Killers | Best International Band | Won |
| 2009 | The Killers | Best Live Band | Nominated |
| 2009 | Day & Age | Best Album | Nominated |
| 2009 | Day & Age | Best Album Artwork | Nominated |
| 2009 | Brandon Flowers | Best Dressed | Nominated |
| 2009 | Brandon Flowers | Worst Dressed | Nominated |
| 2009 | Brandon Flowers | Hero of the Year | Nominated |
| 2010 | Live From The Royal Albert Hall | Best DVD | Nominated |
| 2013 | The Killers | Best International Band | Won |
| 2013 | The Killers | Best Fan Community | Nominated |

=== NME Awards USA ===
The Killers were the main winners at the 2008 inaugural NME Awards USA.

| Year | Nominated work | Award | Result |
|---|---|---|---|
| 2008 | The Killers | Best Live Band | Nominated |
| 2008 | The Killers | Best Band | Won |
| 2008 | "Tranquilize" | Best Indie/Alternative Track | Won |
| 2008 | "Tranquilize" | Best Video | Nominated |
| 2008 | Sawdust | Best Album | Nominated |

== NRJ Music Awards ==
Created by the radio station NRJ, the NRJ Music Awards are awarded annually, in partnership with the television network TF1 in Cannes, France, as the opening of MIDEM.

| Year | Nominated work | Award | Result |
|---|---|---|---|
| 2007 | The Killers | Best International Group/Duo of the Year | Nominated |

== People's Choice Awards ==
The People's Choice Awards is an annual awards show created in 1975 recognizing the people and the work of popular culture.

| Year | Nominated work | Award | Result |
|---|---|---|---|
| 2008 | "Read My Mind" (Friday Night Lights) | Favorite Song from a Soundtrack | Nominated |

== Premios 40 Principales ==
The Premios 40 Principales is an annual Spanish awards show that recognizes the people and works of pop musicians.

| Year | Nominee / work | Award | Result |
|---|---|---|---|
| 2009 | The Killers | Best International Artist | Nominated |

== Q Awards ==
The Q Awards, established in 1985, are the UK's annual music awards and are run by the music magazine Q.

| Year | Nominated work | Award | Result |
|---|---|---|---|
| 2004 | The Killers | Best New Act | Nominated |
| 2006 | "When You Were Young" | Best Video | Won |
| 2007 | "Bones" | Best Video | Nominated |
| 2007 | The Killers | Best Live Act | Nominated |
| 2007 | The Killers | Best Act in the World Today | Nominated |
| 2012 | "Runaways" | Best Video | Nominated |
| 2013 | The Killers at Wembley Stadium & The Garage | Best Event | Nominated |
| 2017 | "The Man" | Best Track | Nominated |
| 2017 | The Killers | Best Live Act | Nominated |
| 2017 | The Killers | Best Act in the World Today | Nominated |

== Shortlist Music Prize ==
The Shortlist Music Prize is awarded annually to an album released in the United States within the last year, as chosen by a panel of musicians, producers and journalists, known as the "Listmakers".

| Year | Nominated work | Award | Result |
|---|---|---|---|
| 2004 | Hot Fuss | Shortlist Music Prize | Nominated |

== TEC Awards ==
The Technical Excellence & Creativity Awards are distributed annually by the Mix Foundation for Excellence in Audio.

| Year | Nominated work | Award | Result |
|---|---|---|---|
| 2005 | "Mr. Brightside" | Outstanding Record Production Single or Track | Nominated |

== Teen Choice Awards ==
| Year | Nominee / work | Award | Result | Ref. |
|---|---|---|---|---|
| 2005 | The Killers | Choice Rock Group | Nominated | |
| 2005 | "Mr. Brightside" | Choice Rock Track | Nominated | |

== UK Festival Awards ==
The UK Festival Awards were established in 2004 and are produced by Virtual Festivals.com. They are voted for by the public via the UK Festival Awards website and receive hundreds of thousands of votes annually. To ensure fairness, the votes are weighted to take into account the event capacity.

| Year | Nominee / work | Award | Result |
|---|---|---|---|
| 2007 | The Killers | Best Festival Rock Act | Won |
| 2007 | The Killers | Best Headline Act | Won |
| 2014 | The Killers | Best Headline Act | Nominated |

== World Music Awards ==
The international World Music Awards annually honors recording artists based on their worldwide sales figures, which are provided by the International Federation of the Phonographic Industry.

| Year | Nominated work | Award | Result |
|---|---|---|---|
| 2005 | The Killers | World's Best Selling New Group | Won |
| 2005 | The Killers | World's Best Selling Rock Act | Nominated |

== Miscellaneous awards ==
| Year | Nominated Work | Award | Presented By |
|---|---|---|---|
| 2006 | "When You Were Young" | Best Singles of 2006 (#2) | Spin |
| 2006 | "When You Were Young" | Best Singles of 2006 (#7) | Slant Magazine |
| 2008 | Hot Fuss | 1001 Albums You Must Hear Before You Die | 1001 Albums You Must Hear Before You Die |
| 2008 | The Killers | Readers' Poll: Band of the Year (#1) | The Guardian |
| 2008 | Day & Age | Best Albums of 2008 (#1) (Readers' Poll) | Rolling Stone |
| 2008 | "Human" | Best Songs of 2008 (#1) (Readers' Poll) | Rolling Stone |
| 2008 | "Human" | Best Songs of 2008 (#15) | Spinner.com |
| 2009 | Hot Fuss | 100 Best Albums of the 2000s (#43) | Rolling Stone |
| 2009 | Hot Fuss | Best Music of the Decade (#41) | The A.V. Club |
| 2009 | "Mr. Brightside" | Hottest 100 of All Time (#38) | Triple J |
| 2009 | "Mr. Brightside" | 100 Best Songs of the 2000s (#48) | Rolling Stone |
| 2009 | "All These Things That I've Done" | 100 Greatest Songs of All Time (#65) | The Daily Telegraph |
| 2010 | Sam's Town | Most Underrated Albums of the Decade (#1) (Readers' Poll) | Rolling Stone |
| 2010 | "Mr. Brightside" | Top 1,000 Songs of All Time (#1) | The Xfm Top 1000 Songs of All Time |
| 2010 | "When You Were Young" | Top 1,000 Songs of All Time (#4) | The Xfm Top 1000 Songs of All Time |
| 2010 | "All These Things That I've Done" | Top 1,000 Songs of All Time (#10) | The Xfm Top 1000 Songs of All Time |
| 2012 | "Miss Atomic Bomb" | Best Songs of 2012 (#1) (Readers' Poll) | Rolling Stone |
| 2012 | Battle Born | Best Albums of 2012 (#2) (Readers' Poll) | Rolling Stone |
| 2013 | Hot Fuss | Best Debut Albums of All Time (#1) (Readers' Poll) | Gigwise |
| 2013 | Hot Fuss | 100 Greatest Debut Albums of All Time (#33) | Rolling Stone |
| 2013 | Hot Fuss | Top Ten Greatest Debut Albums of All Time (#9) (Readers' Poll) | Rolling Stone |
| 2013 | Hot Fuss | 500 Greatest Albums of All Time (#495) | NME |
| 2013 | "Mr. Brightside" | 500 Greatest Songs of All Time (#116) | NME |
| 2013 | The Killers | Greatest Live Acts of 2013 (#1) (Readers' Poll) | Gigwise |
| 2014 | The Killers | Outside Lands 2014: 10 Best Performances (#1) | Billboard |
| 2014 | The Killers | Best Concerts of 2014 (#1) | Lehigh Valley Live |
| 2015 | "All These Things That I've Done" | 100 Greatest Songs of All Time (#75) | The Daily Telegraph |
| 2020 | The Killers | All-Time Best of Vegas (2020): Best Band [Mainstream] (#1) | Las Vegas Weekly |
