= List of awards and nominations received by Green Day =

Green Day awards and nominations
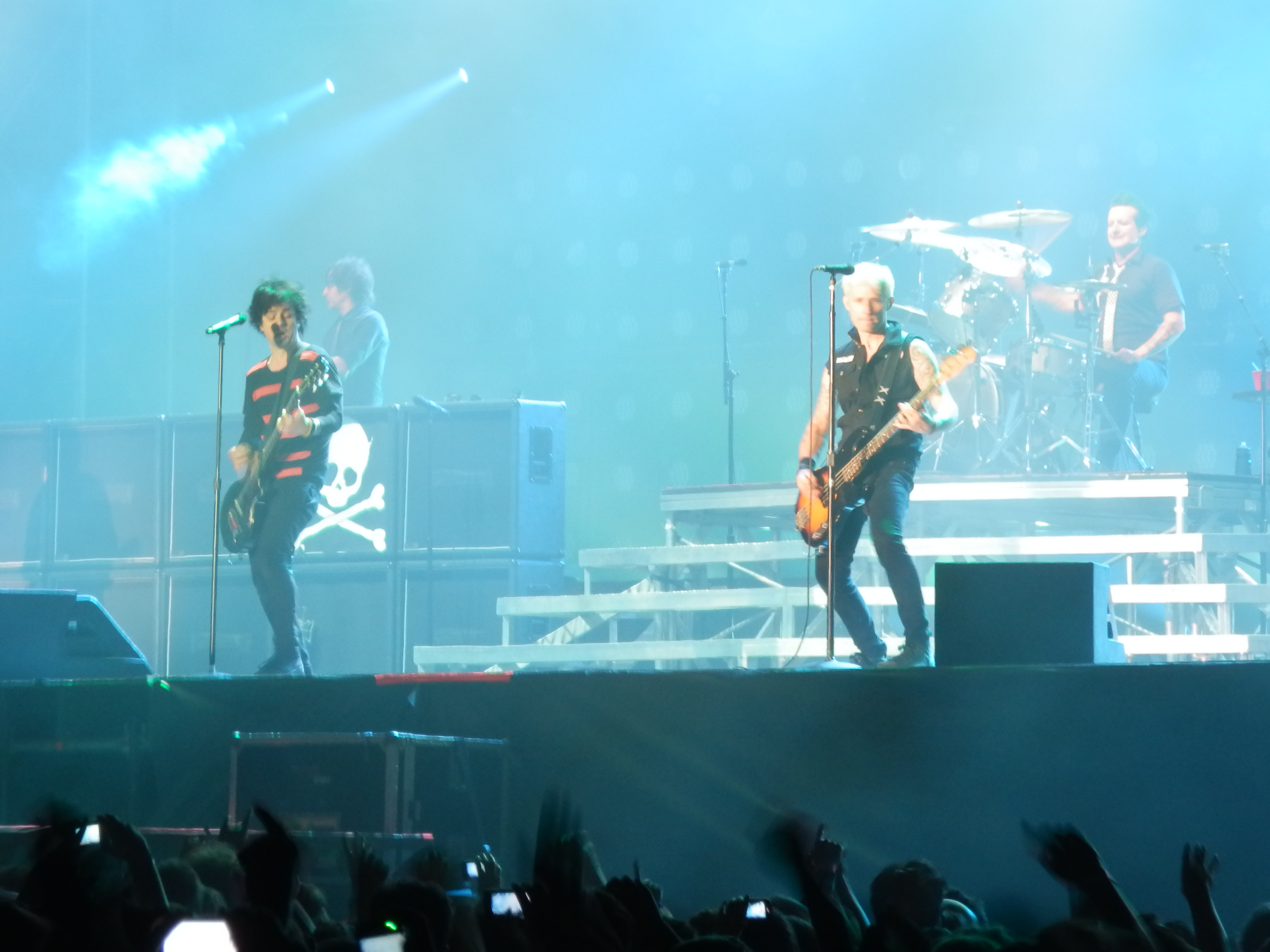
- Green Day performing in 2013
Awards and nominations
Award	Wins	Nominations
American Music Awards	3	12
ASCAP Pop Music Awards	2	2
Billboard Music Awards	6	9
BRIT Awards	2	4
ECHO Awards	1	2
Esky Music Awards	1	1
Gaffa Awards	0	1
Grammy Awards	5	23
Japan Gold Disc Awards	1	1
Juno Awards	1	1
Kerrang! Awards	4	13
Los Premios MTV Latinoamérica	3	3
Meteor Music Awards	0	1
MTV Asia Awards	1	2
MTV Australia Awards	3	5
MTV Video Music Brazil	0	2
MTV Europe Music Awards	6	21
MTV Movie Awards	0	1
MTV Pilipinas Music Awards	1	1
MTV TRL Awards	1	3
MTV Video Music Awards	11	32
MTV Video Music Awards Japan	2	4
mtvU Woodie Awards	2	2
MuchMusic Video Awards	2	8
MYX Music Awards	0	1
NARM Awards	1	1
Kids' Choice Awards	3	3
NME Awards	1	10
People's Choice Awards	1	4
Premios 40 Principales	0	1
Q Awards	1	5
Radio Music Awards	5	8
Spike Video Game Awards	1	2
TEC Awards	1	1
Teen Choice Awards	1	7
TMF Awards	1	4
TRL Awards	0	1
USA's Character Approved Awards	1	1
World Music Awards	0	3
XM Nation Music Awards	1	2
California Music Awards	17	17

Totals (Note: Certain award groups do not simply award one winner. They acknowledge several different recipients, have runners-up, and have third place. Since this is a specific recognition and is different from losing an award, runner-up mentions are considered wins in this award tally. For simplification and to avoid errors, each award in this list has been presumed to have had a prior nomination.)
- Wins: 96
- Nominations: 220

Green Day is an American rock band formed in 1987 in East Bay, California. The band consists of Billie Joe Armstrong (vocals, lead guitar), Mike Dirnt (bass guitar, vocals), and Tré Cool (drums, percussion). The band has released fourteen studio albums: 39/Smooth (1990), Kerplunk (1991), Dookie (1994), Insomniac (1995), Nimrod (1997), Warning (2000), American Idiot (2004), 21st Century Breakdown (2009), the ¡Uno!, ¡Dos!, ¡Tré! trilogy (2012), Revolution Radio (2016), Father of All Motherfuckers (2020), and Saviors (2024). (The first two albums were released on the Lookout! Records record label, while the remaining albums were released on Reprise Records.)

Green Day has found success at the MTV Video Music Awards, receiving nine nominations for "Basket Case", the second single from Dookie; and eight awards for "Boulevard of Broken Dreams", the second single from American Idiot. The band has also received 4 Grammy Awards out of 17 nominations, or 5 out of 20 including their solo recognitions. At the American Music Awards, the trio has received six awards including "Favorite Alternate Artist" award, finally winning it in 2005. The band was nominated for nine Billboard Music Awards in 2005, winning seven of them on the night of the show, including "Rock Artist of the Year" and "Rock Song of the Year".

== American Music Awards ==
The American Music Awards is an annual awards ceremony created by Dick Clark in 1973. Green Day has received three awards from twelve nominations.

Year	Nominated work	Award	Result
1995	Green Day	Favorite Alternate Artist	Nominated
1996	Green Day	Favorite Artist of the Year	Nominated
1996	Green Day	Favorite Heavy Metal/Hard Rock Artist	Nominated
1996	Green Day	Favorite Alternate Artist	Nominated
1998	Green Day	Favorite Alternative Artist	Nominated
1999	Green Day	Favorite Alternative Artist	Nominated
2005	American Idiot	Favorite Pop/Rock Album	Won
2005	Green Day	Favorite Alternative Artist	Won
2005	Green Day	Favorite Pop/Rock Duo or Band	Nominated
2005	Green Day	Artist of the Year	Nominated
2009	Green Day	Favorite Alternative Rock Artist	Won
2025	"Dilemma"	Favorite Rock Song	Nominated

== ASCAP Pop Music Awards ==
The ASCAP Pop Music Awards is an annual awards ceremony sponsored by The American Society of Composers, Authors, and Publishers. Green Day has received two awards.

Year	Nominated work	Award	Result
2005	"Boulevard of Broken Dreams"	Song of the Year	Won
2005	Green Day	Creative Voice Award	Won

== Billboard Music Awards ==
The Billboard Music Awards is an annual music awards show sponsored by Billboard magazine since 1990. Green Day has received six awards from nine nominations.

Year	Nominee / work	Award	Result
2005	American Idiot	Album of the Year	Nominated
2005	Green Day	Artist of the Year	Nominated
2005	Green Day	Album Group of the Year	Won
2005	Green Day	Pop Group of the Year	Won
2005	Green Day	Hot 100 Group of the Year	Won
2005	Green Day	Rock Artist of the Year	Won
2005	Green Day	Modern Rock Artist of the Year	Won
2005	"Boulevard of Broken Dreams"	Digital Song of the Year	Nominated
2005	"Boulevard of Broken Dreams"	Rock Song of the Year	Won

== Brit Awards ==
The Brit Awards are the British Phonographic Industry's annual pop music awards. Green Day has received two awards from four nominations.

Year	Nominee / work	Award	Result
1996	Green Day	International Group	Nominated
2005	Green Day	International Group	Nominated
2006	Green Day	International Group	Won
2006	American Idiot	International Album	Won

== ECHO Awards ==
The ECHO is a German music award granted every year by the Deutsche Phono-Akademie (an association of recording companies). Green Day has received one award.

Year	Nominee / work	Award	Result
2005	Green Day	Best International Group	Won
2013	¡Uno!	Best International Rock/Alternative Group	Nominated

== Esky Music Awards ==
The Esky Music Awards are awarded annually by Esquire magazine. Green Day has received one award.

Year	Nominee / work	Award	Result
2006	Green Day	Best Band	Won

== GAFFA Awards ==
=== GAFFA Awards (Denmark) ===
Delivered since 1991, the GAFFA Awards are a Danish award that rewards popular music by the magazine of the same name.

Year	Nominee / work	Award	Result	Ref.
2005	Bullet In A Bible	Best Foreign DVD	Nominated	

== Grammy Awards ==
The Grammy Awards are awarded annually by the National Academy of Recording Arts and Sciences of the United States of America. Green Day has received 4 awards from 19 nominations, or 5 out of 23 including their solo recognitions: three nominations for Best Rock Song and one for Best Musical Show Album, with Armstrong winning the last one.

Year	Nominee / work	Award	Result
1995	Green Day	Best New Artist	Nominated
1995	"Basket Case"	Best Rock Performance by a Duo or Group with Vocal	Nominated
1995	"Longview"	Best Hard Rock Performance	Nominated
1995	Dookie	Best Alternative Music Performance	Won
1997	"Walking Contradiction"	Best Music Video, Short Form	Nominated
2000	"Espionage"	Best Rock Instrumental Performance	Nominated
2005	American Idiot	Album of the Year	Nominated
2005	American Idiot	Best Rock Album	Won
2005	"American Idiot"	Record of the Year	Nominated
2005	"American Idiot"	Best Rock Song	Nominated
2005	"American Idiot"	Best Rock Performance by a Duo or Group with Vocal	Nominated
2005	"American Idiot"	Best Short Form Music Video	Nominated
2006	"Boulevard of Broken Dreams"	Record of the Year	Won
2007	"The Saints Are Coming" (with U2)	Best Rock Performance by a Duo or Group with Vocals	Nominated
2008	"Working Class Hero"	Best Rock Performance by a Duo or Group with Vocals	Nominated
2010	"21 Guns"	Best Rock Performance by a Duo or Group with Vocals	Nominated
2010	"21 Guns"	Best Rock Song	Nominated
2010	21st Century Breakdown	Best Rock Album	Won
2011	The Original Broadway Cast Recording (produced by Billie Joe Armstrong)	Best Musical Show Album	Won
2014	¡Cuatro!	Best Music Film	Nominated
2025	"The American Dream Is Killing Me"	Best Rock Performance	Nominated
2025	"Dilemma"	Best Rock Song	Nominated
2025	Saviors	Best Rock Album	Nominated

== Japan Gold Disc Awards ==
The Japan Gold Disc Awards is an annual music awards ceremony established by the Recording Industry Association of Japan in 1987. Green Day has received one award.

Year	Nominee / work	Award	Result
2005	American Idiot	Best 10 International Rock & Pop Albums of the Year	Won

== Juno Awards ==
The Juno Awards is a Canadian awards ceremony presented annually by the Canadian Academy of Recording Arts and Sciences. Green Day has received one award.

Year	Nominee / work	Award	Result
2005	American Idiot	Best International Album of the Year	Won

== Kerrang! Awards ==
The Kerrang! Awards is an annual awards ceremony held by Kerrang!, a British rock magazine. Green Day has received four awards from thirteen nominations.

Year	Nominee / work	Award	Result
2001	Green Day	Classic Songwriter	Won
2001	Green Day	Best International Live Act	Nominated
2001	Green Day	Best Band in the World	Nominated
2004	Green Day	Hall of Fame	Won
2005	Green Day	Best Band on the Planet	Won
2005	Green Day	Best Live Band	Won
2005	"American Idiot"	Best Single	Nominated
2005	"Holiday"	Best Video	Nominated
2006	"Jesus of Suburbia"	Best Video	Nominated
2009	Green Day	Best International Band	Nominated
2009	21st Century Breakdown	Best Album	Nominated
2010	Green Day	Best International Band	Nominated
2010	Green Day	Best Live Band	Nominated

== Meteor Music Awards ==
The Meteor Music Awards are the national music awards of Ireland. They have been held every year since 2001 and are promoted by MCD Productions. Green Day has received one nomination.

Year	Nominee / work	Award	Result
2006	"Oxegen 2005"	Best Live Performance	Nominated

== MTV ==
=== Los Premios MTV Latinoamérica ===
Los Premios MTV Latinoamérica is the Latin American version of the MTV Video Music Awards. Green Day has received three awards.

Year	Nominee / work	Award	Result
2005	Green Day	Best International Rock Group	Won
2009	Green Day	Best International Rock Group	Won
2009	Green Day in Rock Band	Best Music in a Video Game	Won

=== MTV Asia Awards ===
The MTV Asia Awards is an annual Asian awards ceremony established in 2002 by the MTV television network. Green Day has received one award from two nominations.

Year	Nominee / work	Award	Result
2006	Green Day	Favorite Rock Act	Won
2006	"Wake Me Up When September Ends"	Favorite Video	Nominated

=== MTV Australia Awards ===
The MTV Australia Awards is an annual Australian awards ceremony established in 2005 by the MTV television network. Green Day has received three awards from five nominations.

Year	Nominee / work	Award	Result
2005	Green Day	Best Group	Won
2005	"American Idiot"	Best Rock Video	Won
2006	"Wake Me Up When September Ends"	Video of the Year	Nominated
2006	"Wake Me Up When September Ends"	Best Rock Video	Nominated
2006	Green Day	Best Group	Won

=== MTV Video Music Brazil Awards ===
The MTV Video Music Brasil is an annual Brazilian awards ceremony established by the MTV Brasil television network.

Year	Nominee / work	Award	Result
2005	Boulevard of Broken Dreams	Best International Video	Nominated
2006	Jesus of Suburbia	Best International Video	Nominated
2009	Green Day	Best International Artist	Nominated
2010	Green Day	Best International Artist	Nominated

=== MTV Europe Music Awards ===
The MTV Europe Music Awards is an annual awards ceremony established in 1994 by MTV Europe. Green Day has received six awards from twenty-one nominations.

Year	Nominee / work	Award	Result
2004	Green Day	Best Rock	Nominated
2005	American Idiot	Best Album	Won
2005	Green Day	Best Rock	Won
2005	Green Day	Best Group	Nominated
2008	Green Day	Best Act Ever	Nominated
2009	Green Day	Best Group	Nominated
2009	Green Day	Best Live Act	Nominated
2009	Green Day	Best Rock	Won
2010	Green Day	Best World Stage Performance	Nominated
2012	Green Day	Best Rock	Nominated
2012	Green Day	Best North American Act	Nominated
2012	Green Day	Best Live Act	Nominated
2013	Green Day	Best Rock	Won
2013	Green Day	Best Live Act	Nominated
2013	Green Day	Best World Stage Performance	Nominated
2016	Green Day	Best Rock	Nominated
2016	Green Day	Global Icon	Won
2016	Green Day	Best Live Act	Nominated
2019	Green Day	Best Rock	Won
2020	Green Day	Best Rock	Nominated
2024	Green Day	Best Rock	Nominated

=== MTV Movie Awards ===
The MTV Movie Awards is a film awards show presented annually on the MTV television network. Green Day has received one nomination.

Year	Nominee / work	Award	Result
1999	"Nice Guys Finish Last" in Varsity Blues	Best Song from a Film	Nominated

=== MTV Pilipinas Music Awards ===
The MTV Pilipinas Music Awards is an annual music awards event held in the Philippines, established in 2006 by the MTV television network. Green Day has received one award.

Year	Nominee / work	Award	Result
2006	"Wake Me Up When September Ends"	Favorite International Video	Won

=== MTV TRL Awards ===
The TRL Awards is an annual music awards ceremony established in 2006 by MTV Italy. Green Day has received one award from three nominations.

Year	Nominee / work	Award	Result
2006	Green Day	Best Band That Plays Instruments	Nominated
2006	Green Day	Countdown Killer	Nominated
2006	Green Day	Roc Da Mic (Best Live Performance)	Won

=== MTV Video Music Awards ===
The MTV Video Music Awards is an annual awards ceremony established in 1984 by MTV. Green Day has received eleven awards from 32 nominations.

Year	Nominee / work	Award	Result
1994	"Longview"	Best Group Video	Nominated
1994	"Longview"	Best New Artist in a Video	Nominated
1994	"Longview"	Best Alternative Video	Nominated
1995	"Basket Case"	Best Group Video	Nominated
1995	"Basket Case"	Video of the Year	Nominated
1995	"Basket Case"	Best Hard Rock Video	Nominated
1995	"Basket Case"	Best Alternative Video	Nominated
1995	"Basket Case"	Breakthrough Video	Nominated
1995	"Basket Case"	Best Direction in a Video	Nominated
1995	"Basket Case"	Best Editing in a Video	Nominated
1995	"Basket Case"	Best Cinematography in a Video	Nominated
1995	"Basket Case"	Viewer's Choice Award	Nominated
1996	"Walking Contradiction"	Best Special Effects in a Video	Nominated
1998	"Good Riddance (Time of Your Life)"	Best Alternative Video	Won
1998	"Good Riddance (Time of Your Life)"	Viewer's Choice Award	Nominated
2005	"Boulevard of Broken Dreams"	Video of the Year	Won
2005	"Boulevard of Broken Dreams"	Best Group Video	Won
2005	"Boulevard of Broken Dreams"	Best Rock Video	Won
2005	"Boulevard of Broken Dreams"	Best Direction in a Video	Won
2005	"Boulevard of Broken Dreams"	Best Editing in a Video	Won
2005	"Boulevard of Broken Dreams"	Best Cinematography in a Video	Won
2005	"American Idiot"	Best Art Direction in a Video	Nominated
2005	"American Idiot"	Viewer's Choice Award	Won
2006	"Wake Me Up When September Ends"	Best Rock Video	Nominated
2007	"The Saints Are Coming"	Most Earthshattering Collaboration	Nominated
2009	"21 Guns"	Best Rock Video	Won
2009	"21 Guns"	Best Direction	Won
2009	"21 Guns"	Best Cinematography	Won
2010	"21st Century Breakdown"	Best Special Effects	Nominated
2017	"Bang Bang"	Best Rock	Nominated
2020	"Oh Yeah!"	Best Rock	Nominated
2024	"Dilemma"	Best Rock	Nominated
2025	"One Eyed Bastard"	Best Rock	Nominated

=== MTV Video Music Awards Japan ===
The MTV Video Music Awards Japan is a music awards show hosted annually by MTV Japan since 2002. Green Day has received two awards.

Year	Nominee / work	Award	Result
2006	"Boulevard Of Broken Dreams"	Best Rock Video	Won
2007	"The Saints Are Coming" (Green Day & U2)	Best Collaboration Video	Won
2010	21st Century Breakdown	Album of the Year	Nominated
2010	"Know Your Enemy"	Best Rock Video	Nominated

=== mtvU Woodie Awards ===
The mtvU Woodie Awards is an annual awards show sponsored by mtvU, a division of MTV Networks. Green Day has received two awards.

Year	Nominee / work	Award	Result
2005	Green Day	Alumni Woodie	Won
2009	Green Day	Performing Woodie	Won

== MuchMusic Video Awards ==
The MuchMusic Video Awards is an annual awards ceremony presented by the Canadian music video channel MuchMusic. Green Day has received two awards from eight nominations.

Year	Nominee / work	Award	Result
2005	"Boulevard of Broken Dreams"	Best International Group Video	Nominated
2005	"American Idiot"	Best International Group Video	Nominated
2005	Green Day	People's Choice: Favourite International Group	Won
2006	"Wake Me Up When September Ends"	People's Choice: Favourite International Group	Nominated
2006	"Jesus of Suburbia"	Best International Group Video	Nominated
2006	"Wake Me Up When September Ends"	Best International Group Video	Won
2009	"Know Your Enemy"	Best International Group Video	Nominated
2010	"21 Guns"	Best International Group Video	Nominated

== MYX Music Awards ==
The MYX Music Awards is an annual awards ceremony presented by the Philippines music video channel MYX. Green Day has received one nomination.

Year	Nominee / work	Award	Result
2006	"Wake Me Up When September Ends"	Favorite International Music Video	Nominated

== NARM Awards ==
The NARM Awards are presented annually by the National Association of Recording Merchandisers. Green Day has received one award.

Year	Nominee / work	Award	Result
2005	Green Day	Outstanding Artist of the Year	Won

== Nickelodeon Kids' Choice Awards ==
The Nickelodeon Kids' Choice Awards is an annual awards show organized by Nickelodeon. Green Day has received three awards.

Year	Nominee / work	Award	Result
1996	Green Day	Favorite Group	Nominated
2005	Green Day	Favorite Music Group	Won
2006	Green Day	Favorite Music Group	Won
2006	Wake Me Up When September Ends	Favorite Song	Won

== NME Awards ==
The NME Awards is an annual music awards ceremony founded in 1953 by the music magazine NME (New Musical Express). Green Day has received four award from ten nominations.

Year	Nominee / work	Award	Result
2005	American Idiot	Best Album	Nominated
2005	"American Idiot"	Best Video	Won
2006	Green Day	Best International Band	Nominated
2006	Green Day	Best Live Band	Nominated
2006	Bullet in a Bible	Best Music DVD	Nominated
2010	Green Day	Best International Band	Nominated
2010	Green Day	Worst Band	Nominated
2010	21st Century Breakdown	Worst Album	Nominated
2010	Billie Joe Armstrong	Hottest Man	Nominated
2013	Green Day secret set at Reading Festival	Best Music Moment of the Year	Nominated

== People’s Choice Awards ==
The People's Choice Awards is an annual awards show created in 1975 by Bob Stivers and produced by Procter & Gamble. Green Day has received two awards from four nominations.

Year	Nominee / work	Award	Result
2006	Green Day	Favorite Tour	Nominated
2006	Green Day	Favorite Musical Group or Band	Won
2010	Green Day	Favorite Rock Band	Nominated
2013	Green Day	Favorite Band	Nominated

== Premios 40 Principales ==
Year	Nominee / work	Award	Result
2006	Wake Me Up When September Ends	Mejor Canción Internacional	Nominated

== Q Awards ==
The Q Awards are the UK's annual music awards established and run by the music magazine Q since 1990. Green Day has received one award from five nominations.

Year	Nominee / work	Award	Result
2005	"Boulevard of Broken Dreams"	Best Video	Nominated
2005	Green Day	Best Live Act	Nominated
2005	Green Day	Best Act in the World Today	Nominated
2010	Green Day	Best Act in the World Today	Nominated
2010	Green Day	Best Live Act	Won

== Radio Music Awards ==
The Radio Music Awards is an annual awards show that honors the year's most successful songs on mainstream radio. Green Day has received five awards from eight nominations.

Year	Nominee / work	Award	Result
2005	"Holiday"	Song of the Year/Alternative and Active Rock Radio	Nominated
2005	Green Day	Artist of the Year/Adult Hit Radio	Nominated
2005	Green Day	Artist of the Year/ Alternative and Active Rock Radio	Won
2005	Green Day	Artist of the Year/Rock Radio	Won
2005	"Boulevard of Broken Dreams"	Song of the Year/Mainstream Hit Radio	Nominated
2005	"Boulevard of Broken Dreams"	Song of the Year/Alternative and Active Rock Radio	Won
2005	"Boulevard of Broken Dreams"	Song of the Year/Adult Hit Radio	Won
2005	"Boulevard of Broken Dreams"	Song of the Year/Rock Radio	Won

== Spike Video Game Awards ==
The Spike Video Game Awards is an awards show hosted by Spike TV. Green Day has received one award from two nominations.

Year	Nominee / work	Award	Result
2004	"American Idiot" in Madden NFL 2005	Best Song in a Video Game	Won
2010	"Basket Case" in Green Day: Rock Band	Best Song in a Video Game	Nominated

== TEC Awards ==
The Technical Excellence & Creativity Awards are distributed annually by The Mix Foundation for Excellence in Audio. Green Day has received one award.

Year	Nominee / work	Award	Result
2005	"American Idiot"	Outstanding Record Production/Single or Track	Won

== Teen Choice Awards ==
The Teen Choice Awards is an annual awards show established in 1999 by the Fox Broadcasting Company. Green Day has received one award from seven nominations.

Year	Nominee / work	Award	Result
2005	"Boulevard of Broken Dreams"	Choice Rock Track	Won
2005	American Idiot	Music Album	Nominated
2005	Green Day	Music Rock Group	Nominated
2009	"21st Century Breakdown"	Music Album Group	Nominated
2009	Green Day	Music Rock Group	Nominated
2009	"Know Your Enemy"	Music Rock Track	Nominated
2010	Green Day: Rock Band	Best Video Game	Nominated

== TMF Awards ==
The TMF Awards are an annual television awards show broadcast live on TMF (The Music Factory) in Belgium, the Netherlands, and the UK. Green Day has received one award from four nominations.

Year	Nominee / work	Award	Result
2005	Green Day	Best International Rock Group	Won
2009	21st Century Breakdown	Best International Album	Nominated
2009	Green Day	Best International Rock Group	Nominated
2009	"21 Guns"	Best International Video	Nominated

== TRL Awards ==
The Italian TRL Awards (from the TV Programme TRL Italy) were established in 2006 by MTV Italy to celebrate the most popular artists and music videos in Italy.

Year	Nominee / work	Award	Result
2010	Green Day	Best International Act	Nominated

== USA's Character Approved Awards ==
Year	Nominee / work	Award	Result
2010	Green Day	USA's Character Approved Award for Musician	Won

== World Music Awards ==
The World Music Awards is an international awards show founded in 1989 that annually honors recording artists based on worldwide sales figures provided by the International Federation of the Phonographic Industry (IFPI). Green Day has received 2 nominations.

Year	Nominee / work	Award	Result
2005	Green Day	World's Best Selling Rock Act	Nominated
2006	Green Day	World's Best Rock Artist	Nominated
2012	Green Day	World's Best Group	Nominated

== XM Nation Music Awards ==
Awarded annually by XM Satellite Radio since 2005, the XM Nation Music Awards "honor some of the most talented and interesting musicians today." Green Day has received one award from two nominations.

Year	Nominee / work	Award	Result
2005	Green Day	"XM Now" - Most Important Established Artist	Nominated
2005	Green Day	Rock Artist of the Year	Won

== California Music Awards ==
The California Music Awards (formerly known as the Bammy Awards) is an annual awards ceremony established in 1978 by BAM (Bay Area Music) magazine editor Dennis Erokan. Green Day has received seventeen awards out of seventeen nominations.

Year	Nominee / work	Award	Result
2001	Green Day	Artist of the Year	Won
2001	Green Day	Outstanding Group	Won
2001	Green Day	Outstanding Male Vocalist	Won
2001	Green Day	Outstanding Bassist	Won
2001	Green Day	Outstanding Drummer	Won
2001	Green Day	Outstanding Songwriter	Won
2001	Warning	Outstanding Album	Won
2001	Warning	Outstanding Punk Rock/Ska Album	Won
2002	Green Day	Outstanding Group	Won
2003	Green Day	Artist of the Year	Won
2003	Green Day	Outstanding Group	Won
2003	Green Day	Outstanding Guitarist	Won
2003	Green Day	"Spirit of Rock" Award	Won
2004	"I Fought the Law"	Most Downloaded Song	Won
2004	Green Day	Outstanding Bassist	Won
2004	Green Day	Outstanding Drummer	Won
2004	Green Day	Outstanding Male Vocalist	Won

== Miscellaneous Awards ==
Year	Nominated Work	Award	Presented By
1994	Green Day	Top Singles Artists of 1994 (#48)	
1994	"Longview"	Best Singles of 1994 (#3)	Rolling Stone
1994	Dookie	Best Albums of 1994 (Readers Choice) (#1)	Rolling Stone
1994	"Basket Case"	Best Singles of 1994 (Readers Choice) (#5)	Rolling Stone
1997	Green Day ~ The Cricketers, Wigan December, 1991	100 Greatest Gigs of All Time (#76)	Kerrang!
1998	Dookie	100 Albums You Must Hear Before You Die (#33)	Kerrang!
1998	Green Day	Top Singles Artists of 1998 (#49)	
1999	"Basket Case"	100 Greatest Music Videos Ever Made (#100)	MTV
2000	Green Day	Top Singles Artists of 2000 (#179)	
2003	Dookie	50 Most Influential Albums of All Time (#5)	Kerrang!
2003	"Good Riddance (Time of Your Life)"	100 Best Songs of the Past 25 Years (#78)	VH1
2004	Dookie	500 Greatest Albums of All Time (#193)	Rolling Stone
2004	"American Idiot"	500 Greatest Songs of All Time (#432)	Rolling Stone
2004	American Idiot	Best Albums of 2004 (#9)	Rolling Stone
2004	American Idiot	Best Albums of 2004 (Readers Choice (#2)	Rolling Stone
2004	Green Day	Top Singles Artists of 2004 (#147)	
2005	"Boulevard Of Broken Dreams"	Top Pop Songs of 2005 (#7)	
2005	"Holiday"	Top Pop Songs of 2005 (#38)	
2005	"Wake Me Up When September Ends"	Top Pop Songs of 2005 (#39)	
2005	Green Day	Top Pop Singles Artists of 2005 (#6)	
2006	Dookie	100 Greatest Albums 1985-2005 (#44)	Spin
2006	Green Day	Top Singles Artists of 2006 (#123)	
2007	"Good Riddance (Time of Your Life)"	100 Greatest Songs of the 90's (#37)	VH1
2007	Dookie	Definitive 200 (#50)	NARM
2007	American Idiot	Definitive 200 (#61)	NARM
2008	"Boulevard of Broken Dreams"	Top 100 Songs of the 2000s So Far (#59)	
2008	Dookie	Top 90 Albums of the 90s (#53)	Spin
2008	American Idiot	100 Best Albums from 1983 to 2008 (#6)	Entertainment Weekly
2009	"Good Riddance (Time of Your Life)"	Hottest 100 of All Time (#75)	Triple J
2009	21st Century Breakdown	Reader's Choice: Best 50 Albums of the 21st Century (#17)	Kerrang!
2009	American Idiot	Reader's Choice: Best 50 Albums of the 21st Century (#1)	Kerrang!
2009	American Idiot	100 Greatest Rock Albums of All Time (#13)	Kerrang!
2009	"Boulevard of Broken Dreams"	Reader's Choice: Top Singles of the Decade (#1)	Rolling Stone
2009	"American Idiot"	Reader's Choice: Top Singles of the Decade (#13)	Rolling Stone
2009	American Idiot	Reader's Choice: Top Albums of the Decade (#1)	Rolling Stone
2009	Green Day	Reader's Choice:Top Artists of the Decade (#1)	Rolling Stone
2009	American Idiot	100 Best Albums of the Decade (#22)	Rolling Stone
2009	"Boulevard of Broken Dreams"	100 Best Songs of the Decade (#65)	Rolling Stone
2009	"American Idiot"	100 Best Songs of the Decade (#47)	Rolling Stone
2009	21st Century Breakdown	Best Albums of 2009 (#5)	Rolling Stone
2009	Green Day	Best of the 2000s Artists of the Decade (#61)	Billboard
2009	American Idiot	Best of the 2000s Billboard 200 Albums (#30)	Billboard
2009	Green Day	Best of the 2000s Hot 100 Artists (#67)	Billboard
2010	Dookie	125 Best Albums of the Past 25 years (#42)	Spin
2010	American Idiot	125 Best Albums of the Past 25 years (#119)	Spin
2010	Green Day	100 Greatest Artists of All Time (#91)	VH1
2012	¡Uno!	Best albums of 2012 (#08)	Rolling Stone
