= Escape from the Sun =

Studio album by Operahouse
- Released: April 2009
- Genre: Indie rock
- Label: Marrakesh

Operahouse chronology
Change in Nature EP (2008)	Escape from the Sun (2009)

Singles from Escape from the Sun
- 1. "Change in Nature"; 2. "Genius Child"

Escape from the Sun is the lone album by the indie-rock band Operahouse. It was released in April 2009 on Marrakech Records. The album was well received, gaining positive reviews from Q, The Sun and Clash Magazine, and strengthened the band's already quickly-growing fanbase. The band received a lot of publicity from Clash Magazine. Operahouse split soon after the album's release.

== Track listing ==
All tracks are written by Operahouse.

No.	Title	Length
1.	"Machine Palace"	3:19
2.	"Change in Nature"	3:59
3.	"Overkill"	3:36
4.	"Genius Child"	3:31
5.	"Mankind"	4:03
6.	"Down in Electric"	3:34
7.	"Escape from the Sun"	4:16
8.	"Criminals"	3:29
9.	"Cult"	4:00
10.	"Kingdom"	4:43
11.	"Kidnap for Suburbia"	3:37
12.	"Hiding Out"	3:37
13.	"Dancing Bear"	4:26

=== Singles ===
No.	Title	Length
1.	"Change in Nature"	3:38
2.	"Genius Child"	4:02
