= Operahouse =

English rock band (2006–2009)

- Origin: London, England
- Genres: Rock, indie rock, alternative rock
- Years active: 2006–2009
- Label: Marrakesh
- Spinoffs: Tribes
- Past members: Johnny Lloyd (vocals/guitar); Jimmy Cratchley (bass, vocals); Alex Kaines (guitar/vocals); Ben Niblett (drums, vocals); Dan White (synths/keyboard, vocals)
- Website: Official site

Operahouse was a five-piece rock band based in Camden, London. Operahouse released their debut single, "Man Next Door" in March 2007 on Glaze Records to great response, earning plaudits and airplay from such stations as BBC 6 Music, Xfm, and BBC Radio 2's Jonathan Ross. Their next single, "Born A Boy", was released on Marrakesh in January 2008 and in addition to getting even more airplay, scored rave reviews in the NME. The follow-up "Diane" was released in May 2008, which was also well received. Their next single, "Change in Nature", marked a new milestone for the band. On the band's MySpace, they claimed that they were "throwing off our indie shackles" and that the music "has a slightly darker ... theme".

== History ==
Singer and guitarist Johnny Lloyd was brought up on The Velvet Underground, The Beatles and Led Zeppelin. He started playing guitar at eight years old, then quit and took up the saxophone for a few years before deciding he preferred guitar. Originally from Newcastle, Lloyd went to London via Rugby where he played football at school with Jimmy Cratchley. Cratchley started playing guitar with Lloyd when they were about 15. He moved to London to study photography at Camberwell Arts College. When Lloyd was looking for people to join the band he asked Cratchley. As Lloyd and Alex Kaines were both playing guitar, and they needed someone on bass guitar, Cratchley took up the role.

Kaines was introduced to Lloyd by a mutual friend in a café in south London, and the basis for Operahouse was formed. Aged 18, Ben Niblett who had been playing drums for five years, was also recruited.

Dan White, the most recent member of the band (being the only member who joined after the band formed), was recruited to play the synthesizer and keyboard, and also played the xylophone beat in "Change in Nature". He appeared in the videos for "Change in Nature" and "Genius Child".

In 2007, the band's first single attracted the attention of Dominic Hardisty, who signed The Killers. Hardisty signed the band to his UK based label Marrakesh Records. Their debut album was released in early 2009.

Operahouse announced their split on 6 July 2009. Johnny Lloyd, Jimmy Cratchley and Dan White have subsequently found new success in indie rock band Tribes, while Alex Kaines (under his real name of Alex Robertshaw) moved on to become guitarist for Everything Everything.

== Discography ==
=== Albums ===
- Change in Nature EP (November 2008, Marrakesh Records)
- Escape from the Sun (April 2009, Marrakesh Records)

=== Singles ===
- "Man Next Door" (March 2007, Glaze Records)
- "Born a Boy" (January 2008, Marrakesh Records)
- "Diane" (May 2008, Marrakesh Records)
- "Change in Nature" (November 2008, Marrakesh Records)
- "Genius Child" (March 2009, Marrakesh Records)
