= Low vs Diamond (album) =

Studio album by Low vs Diamond
- Released: April 1, 2008
- Genre: Indie rock
- Length: 45:02
- Label: Red Ink Records

Professional ratings
Review scores
Source	Rating
Allmusic	3.5/5 stars

Low vs Diamond is the only studio album by American rock band Low vs Diamond, released in 2008 on Red Ink Records.

== Track listing ==
No.	Title	Length
1.	"Don't Forget Sister"	4:09
2.	"Killer B"	4:36
3.	"This is Your Life"	4:07
4.	"Cinema Tonight"	4:40
5.	"Actions Are Actions"	5:07
6.	"Heart Attack"	3:26
7.	"Song We Sang Away"	4:38
8.	"Wasted"	3:51
9.	"Save Yourself"	3:48
10.	"Annie"	2:50
11.	"I'll Be"	3:50
Total length:		45:02
