= Tribes (band) =

British indie rock band

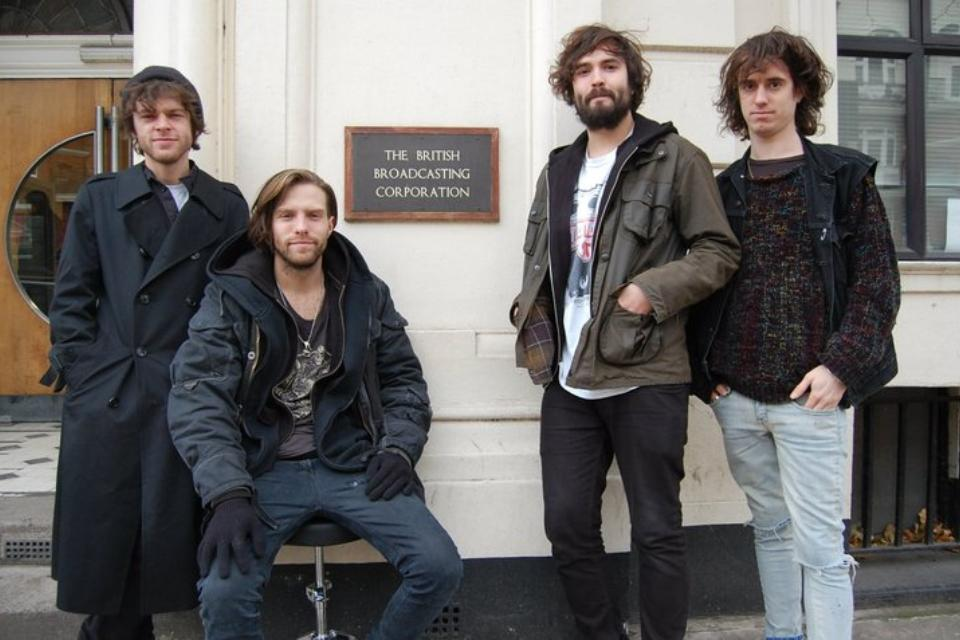
- Tribes outside BBC's Maida Vale Studios in January 2011

Background information
- Origin: Camden Town, London, England
- Genres: Alternative rock, Indie rock, garage rock, blues rock, psychedelic rock, country, grunge
- Years active: 2010–2013; 2020—present
- Label: Island
- Spinoff of: Operahouse
- Members: Johnny Lloyd; Jim Cratchley; Dan White; Miguel Demelo
- Website: tribesband.com

Tribes are a British four-piece indie rock band, based in Camden Town, London, England, that formed in 2010. The group consists of former Operahouse members Johnny Lloyd (vocals and guitar), Dan White (guitar) and Jim Cratchley (bass), along with White's childhood friend, Miguel Demelo (drums).

The band signed to Island Records in March 2011, and shortly after, released their first EP, We Were Children, the title track from which eventually being made Zane Lowe's "Hottest Record in the World" on BBC Radio 1. The band have received praise from publications such as NME, The Fly, Clash and Artrocker, as well as supporting the likes of Mystery Jets, The Kooks, Kaiser Chiefs, Kasabian, Funeral Party, Mona, Pixies and The Rolling Stones during their existence. The band released their debut album, Baby, on 16 January 2012, and quickly followed it up with second album Wish To Scream on 20 May 2013. The band announced their split in November 2013.

In 2020, the band reunited, initially for a one-off charity gig. In 2023 they announced their third studio album, Rabbit Head.

== History ==
=== Founding (2010) ===
After Lloyd, White and Cratchley's former band Operahouse split up in 2009, the three members formed Tribes with an aim to creating a much heavier, grungier sound than that of their former band, who were more of an experimental math-rock/indie outfit (the rest of the Operahouse lineup also going on to find success, with guitarist Alex Robertshaw joining alternative act Everything Everything, and drummer Ben Niblett joining LULS). They enlisted White's childhood friend Miguel Demelo, originally from South Africa, to drum for them. White grew up near Demelo, having tried to steal his wallet at a childhood birthday party a few years previously, and the pair eventually became good friends.

=== Early releases and touring success (2011) ===
In April 2011, Tribes released their first EP titled We Were Children. The music video for the song "We Were Children" was filmed in Camden Town, with the band performing a rooftop gig to onlookers and fans on the street below. The song was named "Hottest Record in the World" by Zane Lowe on BBC Radio 1 on 14 April 2011. "Sappho", the first single from their debut album, was made available for download on 11 July 2011. Tribes received widespread press prior to the release of Baby, particularly from various indie blogs.

The band performed a session at the BBC Maida Vale studios as part of the BBC Introducing project in July 2011.

Tribes played Underage Festival and Field Day Festival in Victoria Park, London in August 2011, as well as Summer Sonic Festival in Tokyo. In addition, the band closed the summer by playing Reading and Leeds Festivals, Freedom Festival, Jersey Live and Bestival and a set at Latitude festival.

The band was the main support to The Kooks on the UK leg of their Autumn tour, and for the European leg of the Kaiser Chiefs tour in November 2011. In between, they headlined their own 9 date UK tour.

The band played XFM's Winter Wonderland 2011 gig at Brixton Academy on 15 December alongside We Are Augustines, Ben Howard, Miles Kane, The Maccabees, The Horrors, a special guest and the Kaiser Chiefs. They also played NME Awards 2012 Tour with Azealia Banks, Metronomy and headliners Two Door Cinema Club.

They state their influences as Nirvana, Pixies, Pavement and R.E.M.

=== Baby and Wish to Scream (2012-2013) ===
Their debut album, Baby, was recorded at The Motor Museum in Liverpool and released on 16 January 2012.

On 10 June 2012, Tribes took part in a charity festival, Chazzstock, which was set up after one of the band's close friends Charles Haddon killed himself. They were joined by The Vaccines, The Horrors and many others.

Tribes finished recording their second studio album, Wish to Scream, in Los Angeles, which was released on 30 May 2013. Tribes announced a string of headline slots on a tour UK tour in 2013, being supported on the first leg of this tour by unsigned Sheffield band Blue Lip Feel. At the Tribes first gig of 2013 they introduced a fifth member to the band on keyboard.

=== Breakup (2013) ===
On 7 November 2013, the band announced on their Facebook page that they were splitting up after four years together.

=== Reunion and Rabbit Head (2020-present) ===
In May 2020, the band announced a one-off reunion charity gig, originally scheduled for 19 December 2020.

On 23 March 2023, the band released the song "Hard Pill", which was included on their third studio album, Rabbit Head, released on 18 August 2023.

== Band members ==
- Johnny Lloyd – lead vocals, guitar
- Jim Cratchley – bass, backing vocals
- Dan White – guitar, backing vocals
- Miguel Demelo – drums, backing vocals
- CJ Burnett – piano, organ, wurlitzer

== Discography ==
=== Albums ===
- Baby (16 January 2012) UK No. 20
- Wish to Scream (20 May 2013) UK No. 45
- Rabbit Head (18 August 2023)

=== EPs ===
- We Were Children (15 April 2011)
1. "We Were Children"
2. "Girlfriend"
3. "Coming of Age"
4. "We Were Children" (Acoustic Demo)
- When My Day Comes (7 October 2011)
1. "When My Day Comes"
2. "Face To Face"
3. "Not So Pretty"
4. "When My Day Comes - Demo"

=== Singles ===
- "Sappho" (11 July 2011)
- "We Were Children" (9 January 2012)
- "Corner of an English Field" (2 April 2012)
- "How the Other Half Live" (February 2013)
- "Dancehall" (April 2013)

== Awards and nominations ==
Year	Organisation	Nominated work	Award	Result
2012	NME Awards	Tribes	Best New Band	Nominated
