= Low vs Diamond =

American rock band

- Origin: Los Angeles, California, USA
- Genres: Indie rock
- Years active: 2002–2010
- Labels: Epic Records / Marrakesh Records
- Members: Howie Diamond (drummer); Lucas Field (singer/guitarist); Tad Moore (keyboardist); Jon Pancoast (bassist); Anthony Polcino (singer/guitarist)

Low vs Diamond was an American rock band formed in 2002 by Lucas Field, Howie Diamond, and Tad Moore (birth name: James Thaddeus Moore IV) while they were students at the University of Colorado. Following graduation, they relocated to Los Angeles, where they met up with the other two members of the band, Anthony Polcino and Jon Pancoast. Low vs Diamond released their debut EP, Life After Love, in February 2007, and their self-titled debut album in April 2008.

== History ==
Singer/guitarist Lucas Field, drummer Howie Diamond, and keyboardist Tad Moore were undergrads at the University of Colorado at Boulder in 2001 when they began to play together playing parties. Diamond graduated in September of '01 and moved to Los Angeles prior to Moore beginning at CU in the fall of 2001 where he met Field. The group were influenced by a diversity of artists, including David Bowie, Roxy Music, Brian Eno, Serge Gainsbourg, and Air. After graduation, the group relocated to Los Angeles, where their band began to explore a more indie rock sound.

They went through various bandmember and name changes (including 1984 and Colored Shadows) before deciding on Low vs Diamond. The name supposedly refers to Howie Diamond's fighting with ex-member Ben Pollock's girlfriend, Lo (the couple later went on to form synthpunk group Hearts Revolution). Two bandmembers, Anthony Polcino (guitar/vocals) and Jon Pancoast (bass), eventually completed the band's line-up. The quintet played gigs all over Los Angeles, where they prepared material to record in the studio.

In mid-2006, the band recorded a demo which attracted the attention of Dominic Hardisty, who signed The Killers. Hardisty signed the band to his U.K.-based label Marrakesh Records, and their debut EP, Life After Love, was released in February 2007. This EP and their highly praised live performances continued to generate buzz. Sony signed them and they released a digital version of their self-titled debut album in April 2008.

Low vs Diamond made their first live television appearance on Late Show with David Letterman on July 29, 2008 and was named one of six artists who are defining pop and rock in 2008 on Rolling Stone. This followed a month later with their first appearance on The Tonight Show with Jay Leno.

The song "Don't Forget Sister" was number 59 on Rolling Stone's list of the 100 Best Songs of 2008.

Low vs Diamond toured with Santigold and was the opening band on her Fall 2008 Tour. Low vs Diamond toured with Third Eye Blind and was the opening band on their Spring 2009 Tour.

As of 2010, Low vs Diamond has officially disbanded. Singer/songwriter Lucas Field released a solo album in 2011, Conquest of Happiness.

In June of 2023, an album of unfinished demos was quietly released onto streaming platforms.

== Discography ==
=== Albums ===
- Low vs Diamond (April 1, 2008, Sony BMG Music Entertainment)
- LVD LP2 Unfinished DEMOS (June 16, 2023, LVD Records)

=== EPs ===
- Life After Love (February, 2007, Marrakesh Records)

=== Singles ===
- "Heart Attack" (2008)
- "Cinema Tonight" (2008)
- "Don't Forget Sister" (2009)

=== Other contributions ===
- The Saturday Sessions: The Dermot O'Leary Show (2007, EMI) - "Moonage Daydream"
