= Marrakesh Records =

US record label

Marrakesh Records was a small UK indie label which, in a previous guise as Lizard King, first signed the Killers. It was founded by Dominic Hardisty and was located in London, England. The company officially dissolved in 2015.

== Artists ==
- The Killers
- Operahouse
- Low vs Diamond
- Kissy Sell Out
- Rob Sharples

== See also ==
- List of record labels
