= Teen Choice Award for Choice Music – Rock Group =

Entertainment award category

The following is a list of Teen Choice Award winners and nominees for Choice Music - Rock Group. It was briefly given out as Choice Music – Rock Artist from 2010 to 2011 before being retitled in 2012. It was discontinued between 2015-2016 until it was given out in 2017 as Choice Music – Rock Artist.

== Winners and nominees ==
=== 2000s ===
Year	Winner	Nominees	Ref.
2000	Blink-182	Goo Goo Dolls; Korn; Limp Bizkit; Lit; No Doubt; Smash Mouth; Sugar Ray	
2001	Blink-182	3 Doors Down; Aerosmith; Crazy Town; Creed; Limp Bizkit; No Doubt; Papa Roach	
2003	Good Charlotte	3 Doors Down; Audioslave; Coldplay; Linkin Park; No Doubt; Sum 41; The White Stripes	
2004	Evanescence	3 Doors Down; Good Charlotte; Hoobastank; Maroon 5; New Found Glory; Simple Plan; Yellowcard	
2005	Simple Plan	3 Doors Down; Coldplay; Franz Ferdinand; Green Day; Jimmy Eat World; The Killers; Velvet Revolver	
2006	Fall Out Boy	The All-American Rejects; Arctic Monkeys; Foo Fighters; Hoobastank; Red Hot Chili Peppers	
2007	Fall Out Boy	The All-American Rejects; Linkin Park; Maroon 5; Red Hot Chili Peppers	
2008	Linkin Park	Boys Like Girls; Fall Out Boy; Paramore; Simple Plan	
2009	Paramore	The All-American Rejects; Green Day; Kings of Leon; Linkin Park	

=== 2010s ===
Year	Winner	Nominees	Ref.
2010	Paramore	Kings of Leon; MGMT; Muse; Train	
2011	Paramore	Foo Fighters; Linkin Park; OneRepublic; Thirty Seconds to Mars	
2012	Fun.	The Black Keys; Foo Fighters; Foster the People; Linkin Park	
2013	Paramore	Awolnation; Imagine Dragons; The Lumineers; Mumford & Sons	
2014	Imagine Dragons	The Black Keys; Coldplay; OneRepublic; Paramore	
2017	Harry Styles	Imagine Dragons; Linkin Park; Paramore; Twenty One Pilots; X Ambassadors	
2018	Imagine Dragons	Panic! at the Disco; Paramore; Portugal. The Man; Twenty One Pilots; X Ambassadors	
2019	Panic! at the Disco	AJR; Cage the Elephant; Imagine Dragons; Lovelytheband; Twenty One Pilots	
