= MuchMusic Video Award for Peoples Choice: Favourite International Group =

The following is a list of the MuchMusic Video Awards, a Canadian music awards show, winners and nominees for "Favourite International Group". While the awards show itself ran until 2018, the "Favourite International Group" category existed only from 1997 until 2007.

== Winners ==
Year	Artist	Video
1997	Bush	"Swallowed"
1998	Backstreet Boys	"Everybody (Backstreet's Back)"
1999	Backstreet Boys	"I Want It That Way"
2000	'N Sync	"Bye Bye Bye"
2001	Backstreet Boys	"The Call"
2002	Blink 182	"First Date"
2003	Good Charlotte	"The Anthem"
2004	Linkin Park	"Numb"
2005	Green Day	"Boulevard of Broken Dreams"
2006	Fall Out Boy	"Dance, Dance"
2007	My Chemical Romance	"Welcome To The Black Parade"
