= MuchMusic Video Award for Best International Group Video =

The following is a list of the MuchMusic Video Awards winners for Best International Group Video.

== Winners ==
| Year | Artist | Video | Ref(s). |
|---|---|---|---|
| 1995 | Weezer | "Buddy Holly" | |
| 1997 | The Chemical Brothers | "Setting Sun" | |
| 1997 | Daft Punk | "Da Funk" | |
| 1999 | The Chemical Brothers f. Noel Gallagher | "Let Forever Be" | |
| 2000 | Red Hot Chili Peppers | "Californication" | |
| 2001 | OutKast | "Ms. Jackson" | |
| 2002 | Korn | "Here to Stay" | |
| 2003 | The White Stripes | "Seven Nation Army" | |
| 2004 | OutKast | "Hey Ya!" | |
| 2005 | The Killers | "Mr. Brightside" | |
| 2006 | Green Day | "Wake Me Up When September Ends" | |
| 2007 | My Chemical Romance | "Welcome to the Black Parade" | |
| 2008 | Linkin Park | "Bleed It Out" | |
| 2009 | The Black Eyed Peas | "Boom Boom Pow" | |
| 2010 | Jonas Brothers | "Paranoid" | |
| 2011 | Far East Movement f. The Cataracs, Dev | "Like a G6" | |
| 2012 | LMFAO | "Sexy and I Know It" | |
| 2013 | Macklemore and Ryan Lewis feat. Wanz | "Thrift Shop" | |
| 2014 | Imagine Dragons | "Demons" | |
