= List of NME Award winners =

This is a list of winners of NME Awards.

== Winners by year ==
=== NME Awards 1953 ===
- Dance Band: Ted Heath And His Music
- Female Vocalist: Lita Roza
- Outstanding Musician: Ronnie Scott
- Small Band: Johnny Dankworth Seven
- Male Vocalist: Dickie Valentine

=== NME Awards 1954 ===
- Band You Would Most Like to See at the NME Pollwinners' Concert: Johnny Dankworth's Orchestra
- Outstanding Drummer: Jack Parnell
- Outstanding Clarinet Player: Carl Barriteau
- Outstanding Tenor Sax Player: Ronnie Scott
- Outstanding Trombone Player: Don Lusher
- Outstanding Alto Sax Player: Johnny Dankworth
- Outstanding Guitar Player: Ivor Mairants
- Outstanding Piano Player: Bill McGuffie
- Outstanding Trumpet Player: Kenny Baker
- Outstanding Bass Player: Johnny Hawksworth
- Outstanding Arranger: Reg Owen
- Outstanding Large Band: Ted Heath And His Music
- Musician of the Year: Ronnie Scott
- Male Vocalist: Dickie Valentine
- Female Vocalist: Lita Roza
- Small Band: Ronnie Scott's Band

=== NME Awards 1955 ===
- Outstanding American Feminine Singer: Doris Day
- The World's Outstanding Musical Personality: Bill Haley
- Top Male Singer: Dickie Valentine
- Outstanding American Male Singer: Frank Sinatra
- Outstanding British Musical Personality: Dickie Valentine
- World's Outstanding Singer: Frank Sinatra
- Outstanding British Feminine Singer: Alma Cogan
- Outstanding British Male Singer: Dickie Valentine
- World's Outstanding Vocal Group: Four Aces
- Large Band Section: Ted Heath And His Music
- Favourite Disc Jockey: Jack Jackson
- Small Bands: The Kirchins
- British Vocal Group: Stargazers

=== NME Awards 1956 ===
- Large Band: Ted Heath
- Small Band: The Kirchins
- Musician of the Year: Eddie Calvert
- Favourite American Singer – Female: Doris Day
- Favourite American Singer – Male: Frank Sinatra
- Female Dance Band Vocalist: Rose Brennan
- Male Solo Singing Star: Dickie Valentine
- Female Solo Singing Star: Ruby Murray
- Favourite Musical Personality: Dickie Valentine
- Most Promising New Band: Ronnie Scott
- Vocal Group: Stargazers
- Male Dance Band Vocalist: Robbie Britton
- Outstanding Popular Singer in the World: Frank Sinatra

=== NME Awards 1957 ===
- Favourite American Female Singer: Doris Day
- World's Outstanding Popular Singer: Pat Boone
- Favourite American Male Singer: Pat Boone
- Favourite British Female Singer: Alma Cogan
- World's Outstanding Vocal Group: The Platters
- British Large Bands: Ted Heath
- Favourite British Male Singer: Dickie Valentine
- British Musical Personality: Tommy Steele
- World's Outstanding Musical Personality: Elvis Presley
- British Vocal Groups: King Brothers
- British Disc Jockey: Jack Jackson
- Small Groups (Skiffle): Lonnie Donegan
- Small Groups (Traditional): Chris Barber
- Small Groups (Modern Jazz): Tony Kinsey

=== NME Awards 1958 ===
- Favourite US Female Singer: Connie Francis
- World's Outstanding Popular Singer: Elvis Presley
- Favourite US Male Singer: Elvis Presley
- World's Outstanding Vocal Group: Everly Brothers
- World's Outstanding Musical Personality: Elvis Presley
- Outstanding Vocal Personality: Frankie Vaughan
- Favourite Male Singer: Frankie Vaughan
- Small Group: Lonnie Donegan
- Favourite Female Singer: Alma Cogan
- Vocal Group: Mudlarks
- Outstanding Instrumental Personality: Eddie Calvert
- Large Band: Ted Heath
- Favourite New Singer (Under 21): Cliff Richard
- Favourite Disc Jockey: Pete Murray

=== NME Awards 1959 ===
- World's Outstanding Male Singer: Elvis Presley
- World's Outstanding Female Singer: Connie Francis
- World's Outstanding Musical Personality: Elvis Presley
- World's Outstanding Vocal Group: Everly Brothers
- Favourite British Male Singer: Cliff Richard
- Favourite British Female Singer: Shirley Bassey
- Favourite British Vocal Group: The Mudlarks
- Favourite British Vocal Personality: Frankie Vaughan
- Favourite British Instrumentalist: Russ Conway
- Favourite British Large Band or Orchestra: Ted Heath
- Favourite British Small Group: Lonnie Donegan
- Favourite British Disc Jockey: Pete Murray
- Favourite British New Disc or TV singer: Craig Douglas
- Favourite British Disc of Year: Cliff Richard's 'Living Doll'
- Favourite British Artist for Poll Concert: Marty Wilde

=== NME Awards 1960 ===
- World Male Singer: Elvis Presley
- World Female Singer: Connie Francis
- World Vocal Group: Everly Brothers
- World Musical Personality: Duane Eddy
- British Vocal Group: King Brothers
- British Large Band or Orchestra: Ted Heath
- British Female Singer: Shirley Bassey
- British Male Singer: Cliff Richard
- British Vocal Personality: Lonnie Donegan
- British Small Group: The Shadows
- Best British Disc of the Year: The Shadows 'Apache'
- New Disc or TV Singer: Emile Ford
- Instrumental Personality: Russ Conway
- Artist For Poll Concert: Adam Faith
- Disc Jockey: David Jacobs

=== NME Awards 1961 ===
- World Female Singer: Connie Francis
- World Musical Personality: Elvis Presley
- World Male Singer: Elvis Presley
- World Vocal Group: Everly Brothers
- British Vocal Personality: Adam Faith
- British Vocal Group: The Springfields
- Instrumental Personality: Bert Weedon
- British Small Group: The Shadows
- British Large Band or Orchestra: Ted Heath
- Best British Disc of the Year: John Leyton's 'Johnny Remember Me'
- British Male Singer: Cliff Richard
- Artist For Poll Concert: Billy Fury
- Trad Jazz Band: Acker Bilk
- British Female Singer: Helen Shapiro
- New Disc or TV Singer: John Leyton
- Disc Jockey: David Jacobs

=== NME Awards 1962 ===
- World's Outstanding Male Singer: Elvis Presley
- World's Outstanding Female Singer: Brenda Lee
- World's Outstanding Vocal Group: Everly Brothers
- World's Outstanding Musical Personality: Elvis Presley
- British Male Singer: Cliff Richard
- British Female Singer: Helen Shapiro
- British Vocal Group: The Springfields
- British Vocal Personality: Joe Brown
- British Solo Instrumentalist: Jet Harris
- British Large Band/Orchestra: Joe Loss
- British Small Group: The Shadows
- British Traditional Jazz Band: Kenny Ball
- British Disc Jockey: David Jacobs
- British New Disc or TV Singer: Frank Ifield
- British Best Disc in 1962: Frank Ifield's 'I Remember You'
- Artist for Poll Concert: Billy Fury

=== NME Awards 1963 ===
Host: Roger Moore

- World Male Singer: Cliff Richard
- World Vocal Group: The Beatles
- World Musical Personality: Elvis Presley
- World Female Singer: Brenda Lee
- British Vocal Personality: Joe Brown
- British Vocal Group: The Beatles
- British Large Band or Orchestra: Joe Loss
- British Small Group: The Shadows
- British Traditional Jazz Band: Kenny Ball
- Best British Disc of the Year: The Beatles 'She Loves You'
- British Female Singer: Kathy Kirby
- Artist for Poll Concert: Billy J Kramer and The Dakotas
- British Male Singer: Cliff Richard
- Disc Jockey: David Jacobs
- New Disc or TV Singer: Gerry Marsden
- Solo Instrumentalist: Jet Harris

=== NME Awards 1964 ===
Host: Tony Bennett

- Outstanding Male Singer: Elvis Presley
- Outstanding Female Singer: Brenda Lee
- Outstanding Vocal Group: The Beatles
- Outstanding Musical Personality: Elvis Presley
- British Male Singer: Cliff Richard
- British Female Singer: Dusty Springfield
- British Vocal Group: The Beatles
- British Vocal Personality: Cliff Richard
- British Rhythm and Blues: The Rolling Stones
- British Instrumental Unit: The Shadows
- British TV or Radio Programme: Ready Steady Go!
- British Disc Jockey: Jimmy Savile
- British New Disc or TV Singer: Mick Jagger
- British Disc This Year: The Animals 'The House of the Rising Sun'

=== NME Awards 1965 ===
Host: Clint Walker

- World Male Singer: Elvis Presley
- World Musical Personality: Elvis Presley
- British R&B Group: The Rolling Stones
- Disc Jockey: Jimmy Savile
- World Female Singer: Dusty Springfield
- World Vocal Group: The Beatles
- British Vocal Group: The Beatles
- British Male Singer: Cliff Richard
- British Vocal Personality: John Lennon
- British Female Singer: Dusty Springfield
- New Disc or TV Singer: Donovan
- British Instrumental Unit: The Shadows
- Best New Group: The Seekers
- Most Popular Disc Jockey: Jimmy Savile
- Best TV or Radio Show: Top of the Pops
- Best New Disc of the Year: The Rolling Stones '(I Can't Get No) Satisfaction'

=== NME Awards 1966 ===
- World Male Singer: Elvis Presley
- World Female Singer: Dusty Springfield
- World Vocal Group: The Beach Boys
- World Musical Personality: Elvis Presley
- British Vocal Group: The Beatles
- British Instrumental Unit: The Shadows
- Best Male Singer: Cliff Richard
- British Vocal Personality: Cliff Richard
- Best R&B Group: Spencer Davis
- Best TV/Radio Show: 'Top of the Pops'
- Top Disc Jockey: Jimmy Savile
- British Female Singer: Dusty Springfield
- New Disc Singer: Stevie Winwood
- Best New Group: Spencer Davis
- Best British Disc This Year: The Beatles – 'Eleanor Rigby'

=== NME Awards 1967 ===
- World's Top Vocal Group: The Beatles
- Best R&B Group: The Rolling Stones
- Britain's Top Singer: Cliff Richard
- World's Top Female Singer: Dusty Springfield
- Top DJs: Jimmy Savile
- Top TV Show: 'Top of the Pops'
- Best New Singer: Engelbert Humperdinck
- Best New Group: Bee Gees

=== NME Awards 1968 ===
- World Male Singer: Elvis Presley
- World Female Singer: Lulu
- World Vocal Group: The Beatles
- World Musical Personality: Elvis Presley
- British Vocal Group: The Beatles
- British Female Singer: Lulu
- Top Disc Jockey: Jimmy Savile
- Best TV/Radio Show: 'Top of the Pops'
- Best New Group: Love Affair
- British Vocal Personality: Cliff Richard
- British R&B Group: The Rolling Stones
- Best British Disc This Year: The Beatles – 'Hey Jude'
- British Male Singer: Tom Jones
- New Disc Singer: Mary Hopkin
- British Instrumental Unit: The Shadows

=== NME Awards 1969 ===
ARTISTS APPEARING:

Blue Mink

Bob & Marcia

Brotherhood Of Man

Lou Christie

Dana

Edison Lighthouse

Johnny Howard Orchestra

Juicy Lucy

Love Affair

Marmalade

Hank Marvin & Shadows

Pickettywitch

Pipkins

Rare Bird

Cliff Richard

Clodagh Rodgers

Vanity Fare

White Plains

=== NME Awards 1970 ===
- World Male Singer: Elvis Presley
- World Female Singer: Diana Ross
- 1970s Best British Single: Mungo Jerry – 'In the Summertime'
- World Musical Personality: Elvis Presley
- Best TV/Radio Show: 'Top of the Pops'
- World Vocal Group: Creedence Clearwater Revival
- British Vocal Personality: Cliff Richard
- British Female Singer: Cilla Black
- New Disc Singer: Elton John
- Best New Group: McGuinness Flint
- Top British Group: The Beatles
- Brit. Instrumental Unit: The Shadows
- Top Disc Jockey: Jimmy Savile
- British Male Singer: Cliff Richard
- 1970s Best British LP: The Beatles - Let It Be

=== NME Awards 1971 ===
- World Male Singer: Elvis Presley
- World Female Singer: Diana Ross
- World Musical Personality: Elvis Presley
- World Vocal Group: Creedence Clearwater Revival
- British Male Singer: Cliff Richard
- British Female Singer: Cilla Black
- Best British Single: Mungo Jerry – 'In the Summertime'
- Best TV/Radio Show: 'Top of the Pops'
- British Vocal Personality: Cliff Richard
- New Disc Singer: Elton John
- Best New Group: McGuinness Flint
- Top British Group: The Beatles
- British Instrumental Unit: The Shadows
- Top Disc Jockey: Jimmy Savile
- Best British LP: The Beatles - Let It Be

=== NME Awards 1972 ===
- World Male Singer: Elvis Presley
- World Female Singer: Diana Ross
- World Musical Personality: Elvis Presley
- World Vocal Group: T. Rex
- British Male Singer: Cliff Richard
- British Female Singer: Cilla Black
- British Vocal Group: T. Rex
- British Vocal Personality: Cliff Richard
- British New Group: New Seekers
- British Instrumental Unit: CCS
- TV or Radio Show: 'Top of the Pops'
- Disc Jockey: Jimmy Savile
- New Disc Singer: Rod Stewart
- Best 1971 Single Disc: George Harrison – 'My Sweet Lord'
- Best 1971 Album: A tie between T. Rex's Electric Warrior and John Lennon's Imagine

=== NME Awards 1973 ===
- World Top Group: Yes
- World Stage Band: Alice Cooper
- World Male Singer: David Bowie
- World Female Singer: Diana Ross
- Most Promising Name: Golden Earring
- Soul Act: Stevie Wonder
- British Top Group: Yes
- British Male Singer: David Bowie
- British Female Singer: Maggie Bell
- Most Promising Name (British): Leo Sayer

=== NME Awards 1974 ===
- British Male Singer: David Bowie
- British Female Singer: Maggie Bell
- British Group: Yes
- British Stage Band: Genesis
- Most Promising New Name (British): Leo Sayer
- Disc Jockey: John Peel
- TV Show: 'Old Grey Whistle Test'
- British Single: The Who – '5.15'
- British Album: Pink Floyd - The Dark Side of the Moon
- Best Guitarist: Eric Clapton
- Best Keyboardist: Rick Wakeman
- Best Bass Guitarist: Paul McCartney
- Best Drummer: Carl Palmer
- Best Producer: David Bowie
- Best Instrumentalist: Roy Wood
- Best Songwriters: Elton John/Bernie Taupin
- Best Soul Act: Stevie Wonder
- Best Dressed Album: Yes - Yessongs
- World Singer: David Bowie
- World Female Singer: Diana Ross
- World Group: Yes
- World Stage Band: Alice Cooper
- World Album: Pink Floyd - The Dark Side of the Moon
- World Single: Golden Earring - "Radar Love"
- World's Most Promising New Name: Golden Earring

=== NME Awards 1975 ===
- British Male Singer: Paul Rodgers
- British Female Singer: Kiki Dee
- British Group: Roxy Music
- British Stage Band: Genesis
- British Disc Jockey: Noel Edmonds
- British Music TV Show: The Old Grey Whistle Test
- Most Promising New Name: Bad Company
- Music Radio Show: Alan Freeman Show
- World Male Singer: Robert Plant
- World Female Singer: Joni Mitchell
- Drummer: Carl Palmer
- Misc. Instrument: Mike Oldfield
- Producer: Eddy offord
- Album: Rod Stewart - Smiler
- Single: Bad Company - "Can't Get Enough"
- Best Dressed LP: Yes - Relayer
- Soul Act: Stevie Wonder
- Klutz of the Year: Steve Harley

=== NME Awards 1976 ===
- Best Group: Led Zeppelin
- Best British Stage Band: Queen
- Best Female Singer: Linda Ronstadt
- Turkey of the Year: Sex Pistols
- Best Male Singer: Robert Plant
- Most Promising Emergent Act: Eddie and the Hot Rods
- Best Keyboardist: Rick Wakeman
- Best Drummer: John Bonham
- Best Songwriter/Composer: Bob Dylan
- Best Television Show: 'The Old Grey Whistle Test'
- Best Disc Jockey: John Peel
- Most Missed Dead Act: Jimi Hendrix
- Best Guitarist: Jimmy Page
- Best Single: Thin Lizzy - :The Boys Are Back In Town"
- Best Album: Led Zeppelin - The Song Remains the Same
- Most Wonderful Human Being: Johnny Rotten
- Best Miscellaneous Instrumentalist: Mike Oldfield
- Best Radio Show: 'Alan Freeman's Saturday Show'
- Best Dressed Sleeve: Led Zeppelin - The Song Remains the Same
- Best Bassist: Paul McCartney

=== NME Awards 1977 ===
- Best Group: Sex Pistols
- Best New Group/Act: Tom Robinson
- Male Singer: David Bowie
- Female Singer: Julie Covington
- Best Album: The Sex Pistols - Never Mind the Bollocks
- Best Single: The Sex Pistols - "God Save the Queen"
- Keyboards: Rick Wakeman
- Drummer: Paul Cook
- Misc. Instrument: Mike Oldfield
- Disc Jockey: John Peel
- Radio Show: John Peel Show
- TV Show: 'The Old Grey Whistle Test'
- Event of the Year: Elvis dying
- Most Wonderful Human Being: Johnny Rotten
- Prat of the Year: Freddie Mercury

=== NME Awards 1978 ===
- Best Male Singer: David Bowie
- Best Female Singer: Debbie Harry
- Best Album: The Jam - All Mod Cons
- Best Single: The Clash - "(White Man) In Hammersmith Palais"
- Best Songwriter: Elvis Costello
- Best Dressed Sleeve: The Rolling Stones - Some Girls
- Best Group: The Clash
- Best New Group: Public Image Ltd
- Best Guitarist: Mick Jones
- Best Bassist: Jean Jacques Burnel
- Best Keyboardist: Dave Greenfield
- Best Drummer: Keith Moon
- Best DJ: John Peel
- Best Radio Show: John Peel Show
- Best TV Show: 'Revolver'
- Most Wonderful Human Being: Sid Vicious
- Pin-Up of the Year: Debbie Harry
- Film: 'Close Encounters of the Third Kind'
- Creep of the Year: John Travolta

=== NME Awards 1979 ===
- Male Singer: Sting
- Songwriter: Paul Weller
- Best Group: The Jam
- Guitarist: Paul Weller
- Bassist: Bruce Foxton
- Keyboards: Dave Greenfield
- Drums: Rick Buckler
- Female Singer: Kate Bush
- Best New Act: The Specials
- Most Wonderful Human Being: John Peel
- Image of the Year: Gary Numan
- Creep of the Year: Gary Numan
- Single: The Specials - "Gangsters"
- Album: The Jam - Setting Sons
- TV Programme: 'Fawlty Towers'
- Best Dressed Sleeve: Public Image Ltd - Metal Box
- Disc Jockey: John Peel
- Radio Show: John Peel Show
- Face of the Decade: Johnny Rotten
- Farce of the Decade: Mod Revival
- Film of the Year: Quadrophenia

=== NME Awards 1980 ===
- Best Group: The Jam
- Best New Act: UB40
- Best Male Singer: Paul Weller
- Best Guitarist: Paul Weller
- Best Drummer: Rick Buckler
- Best Songwriter: Paul Weller
- Best Bassist: Bruce Foxton
- Best Keyboardist: Dave Greenfield
- Best Other Instrumentalist: Saxa
- Best Single: The Jam - "Going Underground"
- Best Album: The Jam - Sound Affects
- Best Dressed Sleeve: The Jam - Sound Affects
- Best Disc Jockey: John Peel
- Best Dressed Person: Adam Ant
- Haircut of the Year: Eugene Reynolds
- Most Wonderful Human Being: Paul Weller
- Creep of the Year: Margaret Thatcher
- Event of the Year: Death of John Lennon
- TV Programme: 'Not the Nine O'Clock News'
- Movie of the Year: The Elephant Man

=== NME Awards 1981 ===
- Best Group: The Jam
- Best New Act: Altered Images
- Most Missed Person: John Lennon
- Best Songwriter: Paul Weller
- Best Female Singer: Siouxsie Sioux
- Best Male Singer: David Bowie
- Best Single: The Specials - "Ghost Town"
- Best LP: Echo & The Bunnymen - Heaven Up Here
- Best Dressed Sleeve: Echo & The Bunnymen - Heaven Up Here
- Best Guitarist: Paul Weller
- Best Bassist: Bruce Foxton
- Best Drummer: Rick Buckler
- Best Keyboardist: Dave Greenfield
- Best TV Programme: Coronation Street
- Best Radio Show: John Peel
- Best Film: 'Gregory's Girl'
- Most Wonderful Human Being: Paul Weller
- Best Dressed Person: Michael Foot
- Creep of the Year: Adam Andy

=== NME Awards 1982 ===
- Best Group: The Jam
- Best Male Singer: Paul Weller
- Best Female Singer: Siouxsie Sioux
- Creep of the Year: Margaret Thatcher
- Most Wonderful Human Being: Paul Weller
- Best Songwriter: Paul Weller
- Best Single: The Jam - "Town Called Malice"
- Best Longplayer: The Jam - The Gift
- Best Live Act: The Jam
- Best Dancefloor Favourite: Wham! - "Young Guns (Go for It)"
- Best Dressed Sleeve: Siouxsie and the Banshees - A Kiss in the Dreamhouse
- Event of the Year: The Jam Split
- Best Dressed Male: Paul Weller
- Best Dressed Female: Siouxsie Sioux
- Best Haircut: Paul Weller
- Best Electronics: Vince Clarke
- Best Guitarist: Paul Weller
- Best Bassist: Bruce Foxton
- Best Drummer: Rick Buckler
- Best Miscellaneous Instrument: The Emerald Express, Violin
- Best Radio Show: John Peel
- Best Music Video: Madness - "House of Fun"
- Best TV Show: The Young Ones
- Best Film: E.T. the Extra-Terrestrial

=== NME Awards 1983 ===
- Best Group: New Order
- Best New Act: The Smiths
- Best Dressed Female: Siouxsie Sioux
- Female Singer: Siouxsie Sioux
- Songwriter: Elvis Costello
- Male Singer: David Bowie
- Best Dressed Male: David Bowie
- Best Long Player: Elvis Costello - Punch the Clock
- Best Single: New Order - "Blue Monday"
- Best Film: Merry Christmas, Mr. Lawrence
- Best Promo Video: Michael Jackson - "Thriller"
- Most Wonderful Human Being: Paul Weller
- Creep of the Year: Margaret Thatcher
- TV Show: The Tube
- Best Dressed Sleeve: New Order - Power, Corruption & Lies
- Best Radio Programme: John Peel
- Best Guitarist: The Edge
- Best Drummer: Budgie
- Best Miscellaneous Musician: The TKO Horns
- Best Bassist: Peter Hook
- Best Keyboardist: Steve Nieve

=== NME Awards 1984 ===
- Best Group: The Smiths
- Best New Act: Bronski Beat
- Best Reggae Act: Smiley Culture
- Best Soul Act: Womack & Womack
- Best TV Show: The Tube
- Best Radio Show: John Peel
- Best Single: Frankie Goes to Hollywood - "Relax"
- Best LP: Cocteau Twins - Treasure
- Best Dressed Sleeve: Frankie Goes to Hollywood – 'Welcome To the Pleasure Dome'
- Promo Video: Frankie Goes to Hollywood - "Two Tribes"
- Best Film: Nineteen Eighty-Four
- Best Male Singer: Bono
- Best Songwriter: Morrissey & Marr
- Best Female Singer: Elizabeth Fraser
- Best Instrumentalist: Johnny Marr
- Best Dressed Person: Paul Weller
- Creep of the Year: Margaret Thatcher
- Most Wonderful Human Being: Arthur Scargill

=== NME Awards 1985 ===
- Best Group: The Smiths
- Best New Act: The Jesus and Mary Chain
- Best Male Singer: Morrissey
- Best Female Singer: Liz Fraser
- Best Songwriter: Morrissey/Marr
- Best Single: The Jesus and Mary Chain – 'Never Understand'
- LP of the Year: The Smiths – 'Meat Is Murder'
- Best Soul/Funk Band: Cameo
- Best Reggae Act: UB40
- Best Live Act: The Pogues
- Most Wonderful Human Being: Bob Geldof
- Creep of the Year: Margaret Thatcher
- Best Dressed: Morrissey
- Worst Dressed: Bob Geldof
- Best Haircut: Morrissey
- Worst Haircut: Feargal Sharkey
- Biggest Mouth: Bob Geldof
- Best Film: 'Letter to Brezhnev'
- Best TV Programme: 'Whistle Test'
- Best Radio Show: John Peel
- Best Video: Talking Heads – 'Road to Nowhere'
- Best Dressed Sleeve: The Pogues – 'Rum, Sodomy And the Lash'
- Best Hype: The Jesus and Mary Chain

=== NME Awards 1986 ===
- Best Single: The Smiths – 'Panic'
- Best LP: The Smiths – 'The Queen Is Dead'
- Best Male Singer: Morrissey
- Best Female Singer: Liz Fraser
- Best Group: The Smiths
- Most Wonderful Human Being: Morrissey
- Best Club/Venue: Town & Country Club
- Best Dance Record: Cameo – 'Word Up'
- Threat of the Year: AIDS
- Sex Symbol: Joanne Whalley
- Event of the Year: 1986 FIFA World Cup
- Best Film: 'Mona Lisa'
- Best TV Show: 'The Singing Detective'
- Creep of the Year: Margaret Thatcher
- Best New Music: The Housemartins
- Best Radio Show: John Peel

=== NME Awards 1987 ===
- Best Group: The Smiths
- Best Single: Prince - "Sign o' the Times"
- Best LP: The Smiths - Strangeways, Here We Come
- Male Singer: Morrissey
- Best Female Singer: Suzanne Vega
- Best New Act: The Proclaimers
- Best Dance Record: M/A/R/R/S – 'Pump Up the Volume'
- Most Wonderful Human Being: Morrissey
- Creep of the Year: Margaret Thatcher
- Bad News of the Year: Another Conservative Victory at the General Election
- Safe Sex: Morrissey
- Radio: John Peel
- Best TV Programme: 'Brookside'
- Best Film: 'Angel Heart'
- Event of the Year: Nuclear Agreement

=== NME Awards 1988 ===
- Best Band: The Wedding Present
- Solo Artist: Morrissey
- Best New Band/Act: The House of Love
- Best Single: The House of Love – 'Destroy The Heart'
- Best LP: R.E.M. – 'Green'
- Best TV Show: 'Brookside'
- Ugly Bastard of the Year: Bros (collective)
- Object of Desire of the Year: Wendy James
- Film of the Year: 'A Fish Called Wanda'
- Favourite NME Cover of 1988: Morrissey
- Best Night Out: The Wedding Present
- Radio Show of the Year: John Peel
- Stimulant of the Year: Acid
- Event of the Year: Mandela's Birthday Bash
- Bad News of the Year: US Election Result
- Most Wonderful Human Being: Morrissey
- Creep of the Year: Margaret Thatcher

=== NME Awards 1989 ===
- Band of the Year: The Stone Roses
- LP of the Year: The Stone Roses – 'The Stone Roses'
- Single of the Year: The Stone Roses – 'Fool's Gold'
- Best New Band/Artist: The Stone Roses
- Best Solo Artist: Morrissey
- Best Dance Record: Happy Mondays – 'WFL'
- Hype of the Year: 'Batman'
- Object of Desire: Wendy James
- Radio Show: John Peel
- TV Show: 'Blackadder'
- Film of the Year: 'Dead Poets Society'
- Fashion of the Year: Flares
- Club/Venue of the Year: The Haçienda
- Event of the Year (Music): Reading Festival
- Event of the Year (Real Life): Revolution In Eastern Europe
- Bastard of the Year: Margaret Thatcher

=== NME Awards 1990 ===
- Best Single: The Charlatans – 'The Only One I Know'
- Best LP: Happy Mondays – 'Pills 'n' Thrills and Bellyaches'
- Best New Band/Artist: The Charlatans
- Best Band: Happy Mondays
- Event of the Year: Thatcher's Resignation
- Solo Artist: Morrissey
- Radio Show: John Peel
- TV Show: Vic Reeves Big Night Out
- Film of the Year: 'Wild at Heart'
- Club Or Venue: Town & Country Club
- Hype of the Year: Teenage Mutant Ninja Turtles
- Fashion Item of the Year: DM Boots
- Bastard of the Year: Saddam Hussein
- Object of Desire: Betty Boo
- Word/Phrase: 'You wouldn't let it lie!"

=== NME Awards 1991 ===
- Best Band: R.E.M.
- Best LP: Primal Scream – 'Screamadelica'
- Best Single: Nirvana – 'Smells Like Teen Spirit'
- Best New Band: Kingmaker
- Best Venue: Town & Country Club
- Best Solo Artist: Morrissey
- Bastard of the Year: Saddam Hussein
- Film of the Year: 'The Silence of the Lambs'
- Radio Show of the Year: John Peel
- Fashion Item: DM Boots
- Event of the Year: The release of the hostages
- Object of Desire: Toni Halliday
- TV Show: 'Vic Reeves Big Night Out'
- Worst Record: Bryan Adams – '(Everything I Do) I Do It for You'
- Word/Phrase: "You fat bastard"

=== NME Awards 1992 ===
- Best Band: R.E.M.
- Best Album: R.E.M. – 'Automatic for the People'
- Solo Artist: Morrissey
- Venue: Town & Country Club
- Single: Suede – 'The Drowners'
- Worst Record: The Shamen – 'Ebeneezer Goode'
- New Band: Suede
- Event: Bill Clinton winning the US election
- Fashion Item: Dr. Martens
- Bastard of the Year: John Major
- Hype of the Year: Madonna's 'Sex'
- TV Show of the Year: 'Have I Got News For You'
- Word/Phrase of the Year: "Not!"
- Film of the Year: 'Wayne's World'
- Radio Show of the Year: John Peel
- Object of Desire: Toni Halliday

=== NME Awards 1994 ===
Presenters: Vic Reeves and Bob Mortimer

- Best New Band: Elastica
- Best Single: Radiohead – 'Creep'
- Best Band: Suede
- Best Album: The Boo Radleys – 'Giant Steps'
- Best Dance Act: Orbital
- Godlike Genius Award: John Peel
- Live Event: Megadog
- Rap Act: Cypress Hill
- Best Film: Reservoir Dogs
- Worst Record: Meat Loaf – 'I'd Do Anything for Love (But I Won't Do That)'
- Best Venue: The Forum
- Event of 1993: Unity March
- Best Radio Show: John Peel
- Hype: Jurassic Park
- Best Solo Artist: Björk
- Best New Act: Credit To The Nation
- Bastard: John Major
- Object of Desire: Björk

=== NME Awards 1995 ===
Presenters: Tip Top TV

- Best LP (voted by NME readers): Blur – Parklife
- Best Single (voted by NME readers): Oasis – "Live Forever"
- Best New Band: Oasis
- Best Solo Artist: Paul Weller
- Worst Record: Whigfield – "Saturday Night"
- Film of the Year: Pulp Fiction
- Best TV Show: Knowing Me Knowing You with Alan Partridge
- Best Comedian: Steve Coogan
- Most Desirable Human Being: Kylie Minogue
- Best Club/Venue: Brixton Academy
- NME Album of the Year: Oasis – Definitely Maybe
- NME Singles of the Year: Blur – "Girls & Boys"
- Philip Hall/On Award for Best New Act: Gene
- Godlike Genius Award For Services To Music: Alan McGee, Creation Records
- Live Act of the Year: Blur
- Best Rap Artist: Warren G
- Event of the Year: Glastonbury Festival
- Bummer of the Year: Kurt Cobain's Suicide
- Best Video: Blur – "Parklife"
- Best Band: Blur
- Best Live Event: Orbital at Glastonbury

=== NME Awards 1996 ===
Presenters: Vic Reeves and Bob Mortimer

- Best Live Act: Oasis
- Best Band: Oasis
- Best LP: Oasis - '(What's the Story) Morning Glory?'
- Best Single: Oasis - 'Wonderwall'
- Vibes Award For Best Dance Act: Goldie
- Best Dance Act: The Prodigy
- Best Solo Artist: Paul Weller
- The Special Award For Services Beyond The Call of Duty: Tony Crean for organising the War Child LP
- Album of the Year: Tricky – 'Maxinquaye'
- Single of the Year: Black Grape – 'Reverend Black Grape'
- Worst Record: Robson and Jerome – 'I Believe'
- Godlike Genius Award: Michael Eavis
- Best Musical Event: Glastonbury Festival
- Non- Musical Event: French Nuclear Testing
- Best Dressed Person: Jarvis Cocker
- Worst Dressed Person: Jarvis Cocker
- Best Video: Pulp – 'Common People'
- Live Act of the Year: Pulp
- Best TV Programme: Shooting Stars
- Best New Band: Supergrass
- The Philip Hall Radar Award: Rocket From The Crypt
- Best Radio Show: Radio 1's Evening Session
- Best Film: The Usual Suspects
- Best Comedian: Steve Coogan
- Most Desirable Human Being: Liam Gallagher
- Git of the Year: Damon Albarn
- Best Venue: Brixton Academy

=== NME Awards 1997 ===
- Best LP (voted for by readers): Manic Street Preachers – 'Everything Must Go'
- Best Single (voted for by readers): Manic Street Preachers – 'A Design for Life'
- Best Live Act: Manic Street Preachers
- Musical Moment of the Year: Skinner, Baddiel and the Lightning Seeds - 'Three Lions'
- Best LP: Beck – 'Odelay'
- Best Single: Underworld – 'Born Slippy'
- Worst Single: Spice Girls – 'Wannabe'
- Best Solo Artist: Beck
- Best Radio Show: Radio 1 Evening Session
- Most Desirable Person: Louise Wener
- Best Video: The Prodigy – 'Firestarter'
- Biggest Disappointment: The Stone Roses breaking up
- Best Club/Venue: Brixton Academy
- Best Band (voted by readers): Oasis
- Worst Dressed Person: Liam Gallagher
- Worst Band: Blur
- Arse of the Year: Damon Albarn
- Musical Event of the Year: Oasis at Knebworth
- Radio 1 Evening Session of the Year: Suede
- Best New Band/Artist: Kula Shaker
- Philip Hall/On Award for Best New Act: Super Furry Animals
- Best Dance Act: The Prodigy
- Vibes Award For Best Dance Act: Orbital
- Best Film: 'Trainspotting'
- Best TV Show: 'Shooting Stars'

=== NME Awards 1998 ===
Presenter: Eddie Izzard

- Best Band:The Verve
- Best LP: Radiohead – 'OK Computer'
- Godlike Genius:- Mark E Smith of The Fall.
- Best Single: The Verve – 'Bitter Sweet Symphony'
- Best Solo Artist: Beck
- Worst Single: Aqua – 'Barbie Girl'
- Best Film: 'The Full Monty'
- Musical Event of 1997: Glastonbury Festival
- Radio 1 Evening Session of the Year: Radiohead
- Best TV Show: 'Shooting Stars'
- Best Dance Act: Prodigy
- Best Radio Show: Radcliffe & Lard
- Best New Band: Embrace
- Best Club/Venue: Brixton Academy
- Best Music Video: The Verve – 'Bitter Sweet Symphony'
- Best Dance Single: The Prodigy – 'Smack My Bitch Up'
- Dickhead of the Year: Liam Gallagher
- Most Desirable Person: Louise Nurding

=== NME Premier Awards 1999 ===
- Best Single: Manic Street Preachers – 'If You Tolerate This Your Children Will Be Next'
- Best Band: Manic Street Preachers
- Best Music Video: Manic Street Preachers – 'If You Tolerate This Your Children Will Be Next'
- Best Album: Manic Street Preachers – 'This Is My Truth Tell Me Yours'
- Best New Band: Gomez
- Best Radio Show: Mark Radcliffe
- Best Dance Act: Fatboy Slim
- Best Dance Record: Fatboy Slim – 'The Rockafeller Skank'
- Godlike Genius: Massive Attack
- Best TV Show: 'South Park'
- Best Film: 'Lock, Stock and Two Smoking Barrels'
- Musical Event of the Year: Glastonbury Festival
- Best Solo Artist: Robbie Williams
- Most Desirable Person: Natalie Imbruglia
- Worst Record: Billie Piper – 'Because We Want To'
- Dickhead of the Year: Liam Gallagher
- Best Venue: Brixton Academy
- The Pop Personality's Brain That Should Be Kept Alive For Posterity: Nicky Wire
- The Pop Personality Who Would Make The Best Drugs Czar: Shaun Ryder
- The Pop Personality You Would To See On A Blind Date: Marilyn Manson & Billie Piper
- The Pop Personality That You'd Most Like As Your Doctor: Natalie Imbruglia
- The Pop Personality You Would Most Like To Shopping With: Brian Molko
- The Pop Personality You Would Most Like To Cook You A Meal: Tiny Woods
- The Pop Personality You Would Most Like To Be Marooned On A Desert Island With: Louise
- The Pop Personality You Would Most Like As Prime Minister: Nicky Wire
- The Pop Personality That You'd Most Like As Your Driving Instructor: Jay Kay
- The Pop Personality You Would Most Like To See In A Ring With Mike Tyson: Billie Piper

=== NME Premier Awards 2000 ===
Host: Steve Lamacq and Mary Anne Hobbs.

The award party took place at the Mermaid Theatre in London on February 1, 2000.

- Philip Hall On Award: Terris
- Live Act of the Year: Mogwai
- Best Live Act: Super Furry Animals
- on the Decks Awards For Dance Act of the Year: Death In Vegas
- Carling Premier Best New Artist: Muse
- Breezeblack Mix of 1999: Junior Carter
- Best Solo Artist: Beck
- Best Album Ever: The Stone Roses – 'The Stone Roses'
- Best Single Ever: Nirvana – 'Smells Like Teen Spirit'
- Total Genius of the Year: Ali G
- Greatest Musical Event Ever: Woodstock
- Best Radio Show: Radio 1 Evening Session
- Carling Premier Best LP: The Flaming Lips – 'The Soft Bulletin'
- NME Album of the Year: The Flaming Lips – 'The Soft Bulletin'
- NME Single of the Year: Aphex Twin – 'Windowlicker'
- Best TV Show: 'The Royle Family'
- Musical Event of the Year: Glastonbury
- Best Venue: Brixton Academy
- Dickhead of the Year: Robbie Williams
- Best Website: NME.COM
- Worst Record of the Year: The Vengaboys – 'We're Going to Ibiza'
- Best Film: 'The Blair Witch Project'
- Best DJ: Fatboy Slim
- NME.COM Award For Best NME Premier Show Performance: Ooberman
- Best Dance Act: The Chemical Brothers
- Best Music Video: Blur – 'Coffee & TV'
- Best Band: Blur
- Best Single: Blur – 'Tender'
- Best Band Ever: The Beatles
- Godlike Genius Award For Services To Music: Shaun Ryder
- Radio 1 Evening Session Session of the Year: Supergrass
- Artist of the Year: Travis

=== NME Awards 2001 ===
Host: Peter Kay

- Best Band: Radiohead
- Best Dance Act: Fatboy Slim
- Best Radio Show: Steve Lamacq
- Best Metal Act: Marilyn Manson
- Best Club DJ: Carl Cox
- Radio 1 Evening Session of the Year: Coldplay
- Best New Artist: Coldplay
- Best Single: Coldplay – 'Yellow'
- NME Carling Awards Tour Award: Amen, JJ72, Alfie
- Best Rock Act: U2
- Hero of the Year: Liam Gallagher
- Godlike Genius: U2
- Best Hip Hop/Rap Act: Eminem
- Villain of the Year: Robbie Williams
- Philip Hall On Award: Starsailor
- Best Pop Act: All Saints
- Best Club: Cream
- Best LP: Primal Scream – 'XTRMNTR'
- Best R&B/Soul Act: Kelis
- Best Solo Artist: Badly Drawn Boy
- Best Film: 'Gladiator'
- Musical Event of the Year: The Carling Weekend
- Best TV Programme: 'The League of Gentlemen'

=== NME Carling Awards 2002 ===
Host: Zane Lowe

- Best New Act: The Strokes
- Band of the Year: The Strokes
- Album of the Year: The Strokes – 'Is This It'
- Best Pop Act: Kylie Minogue
- Best Solo Artist: Ian Brown
- Best Video: Radiohead – 'Pyramid Song'
- Best Live Act: U2
- Outstanding Contribution to NME: The Charlatans
- Best Radio 1 Session: The Charlatans
- Best Heavy Metal Group: Lostprophets
- Honorary NME Carling Tour Award: Lostprophets
- Honorary NME Carling Tour Award: Andrew WK
- Honorary NME Carling Tour Award: The Coral
- Philip Hall On Award: The Coral
- Best Radio Show: The Evening Session
- Best Hip-Hop/Rap Act: Missy Elliott
- Best R&B/Soul Act: Aaliyah
- Best Dance Act: Basement Jaxx
- Best TV Show: 'The Office'
- Best Film: 'Moulin Rouge!'
- Godlike Genius Award: Nick Kent and Pennie Smith
- Best Single: Ash – 'Burn Baby Burn'

=== NME Carling Awards 2003 ===
Host: Bill Bailey

- NME Album of the Year: Coldplay – 'A Rush of Blood to the Head'
- Album of the Year: Coldplay – 'A Rush of Blood to the Head'
- NME Artist of the Year: Oasis
- Best UK Band: Oasis
- Best New Band: The Libertines
- Best Single: The Vines – 'Get Free'
- NME Best Single: Doves – 'There Goes the Fear'
- Best International Band: The Hives
- The Fuck Me! Award For Innovation: The Polyphonic Spree
- Philip Hall Hot New Band Award: Yeah Yeah Yeahs
- Best Video: Black Rebel Motorcycle Club – 'Whatever Happened To My Rock And Roll (Punk Song)'
- Best Solo Artist: Ryan Adams
- Hero of the Year: Ozzy Osbourne
- Best TV Show: 'The Osbournes'
- Best Live Venue: London Astoria
- Best Haircut: Liam Gallagher
- Best Dressed: The Hives
- Best Website: NME.com
- Event of the Year: Reading and Leeds Festivals
- Villain of the Year: Robbie Williams
- Worst Album: Robbie Williams – 'Escapology'
- Worst Single: Robbie Williams – 'Feel'
- Worst Band: Nickelback
- Worst Haircut: Jack Osbourne
- Worst Dressed: Christina Aguilera

=== NME Awards 2004 ===
Host: Vernon Kay

- Best Video: Radiohead – 'There There'
- Best Album: Radiohead – 'Hail to the Thief'
- Best New Band: Kings of Leon
- Best International Band: Kings of Leon
- Living Legend: Arthur Lee
- Best Single: The White Stripes – 'Seven Nation Army'
- Best Solo Artist: Ryan Adams
- Worst Single: Fast Food Rockers – 'Fast Food Song'
- Most Missed: Johnny Cash
- Best Website: NME.COM
- Hero of the Year: Pete Doherty
- Villain of the Year: George H. W. Bush
- Fight of the Year: Jack White vs Jason Von Bondie
- Waster of the Year: Pete Doherty
- Sexiest Man: Har Mar Superstar
- Sexiest Woman: Brody Dalle
- Best Haircut: Caleb Followill
- Best Live Venue: Brixton Academy
- Best Album Artwork: Radiohead 'Hail to the Thief'
- Best TV Show: 'The Office'
- Best Film: 'The Lord of the Rings: The Return of the King'
- The Fuck Me! Award For Innovation: Dizzee Rascal

=== Shockwaves NME Awards 2005 ===
Host: Simon Pegg and Nick Frost.

- Best Radio Show - Zane Lowe
- Best Solo Artist - Graham Coxon
- Best Live Band - Muse
- Best Track - Franz Ferdinand - "Take Me Out"
- Best Music DVD - Oasis - Definitely Maybe DVD
- Philip Hall Radar Award - Kaiser Chiefs
- Best TV Show - Little Britain
- Best International Band - The Killers
- Best New Band - Razorlight
- Best Video - Green Day - "American Idiot"
- Special Award For Lifelong Service To Music - John Peel
- John Peel Award For Musical Innovation - The Others
- Best Film - Shaun of the Dead
- Best Album - Franz Ferdinand - Franz Ferdinand
- Best Live Event - Glastonbury
- Best British Band - The Libertines
- Godlike Genius Award - New Order & Joy Division
- Best Dressed: Brandon Flowers, of The Killers
- Worst Dressed: Britney Spears
- Best Live Venue: London Carling Brixton Academy
- Best Website: NME.com
- Hero of the Year: John Peel
- Sexiest Man: Brandon Flowers, of The Killers
- Sexiest Woman: Gwen Stefani
- Worst Album: Insane Clown Posse, for Carnival of Carnage
- Worst Band: Insane Clown Posse

=== Shockwaves NME Awards 2006 ===
Host: Russell Brand

- Best New Band - Arctic Monkeys
- Best Video - Oasis - "The Importance of Being Idle"
- Best International Band - The Strokes
- Best TV Show - Gonzo (on MTV Two)
- Best Solo Artist - Kanye West
- Philip Hall Radar Award - The Long Blondes
- Best Radio Show - Zane Lowe
- Best Event - Reading and Leeds Festivals
- Best Live Band - Franz Ferdinand
- Best Music DVD - Live 8
- Best Film - Harry Potter and the Goblet of Fire
- John Peel Music Innovation Award - Gorillaz
- Best Track - Arctic Monkeys - "I Bet You Look Good on the Dancefloor"
- Best Album - Kaiser Chiefs - Employment
- Best British Band - Arctic Monkeys
- Godlike Genius Award - Ian Brown
- Best Website - NME.com
- Best Venue - Brixton Academy
- Hero of the Year - Bob Geldof
- Villain of the Year - George W. Bush
- Best Dressed - Ricky Wilson
- Worst Dressed - Justin Hawkins
- Worst Album - James Blunt - Back to Bedlam
- Worst Band - Son of Dork
- Sexiest Man - Pete Doherty
- Sexiest Woman - Madonna

=== Shockwaves NME Awards 2007 ===
Host: Lauren Laverne

- Godlike Genius Award - Primal Scream
- Best British Band - Muse
- Best International Band - My Chemical Romance
- Best Solo Artist - Jamie T
- Best Live Band - Kasabian
- Best New Band - Klaxons
- Best Album - Arctic Monkeys - Whatever People Say I Am, That's What I'm Not
- Best Track - The View - "Wasted Little DJs"
- Best Video - The Killers - "Bones"
- Best Music DVD - Arctic Monkeys - Scummy Man
- Best Live Event - Carling Weekend: Reading and Leeds Festivals
- Best TV Show - The Mighty Boosh
- Best Radio Show - Zane Lowe (BBC Radio 1)
- Best Film - Pirates of the Caribbean: Dead Man's Chest
- Sexiest Woman - Kate Moss
- Sexiest Man - Matt Bellamy (Muse)
- Worst Album - Robbie Williams - Rudebox
- Worst Band - Panic! at the Disco
- Best Dressed - Faris Rotter (The Horrors)
- Worst Dressed - Jonathan Ross
- Hero of the year - Gerard Way (My Chemical Romance)
- Villain of the Year - George W. Bush
- Best Live Venue - Carling Brixton Academy
- Best Website (excluding NME.com) - YouTube
- John Peel Award For Musical Innovation - Enter Shikari
- Philip Hall Radar Award - The Twang

=== Shockwaves NME Awards 2008 ===
The award party took place in indigO_{2} next to The O2 Arena on 28 February 2008.

Host: Matt Horne and James Corden

- Godlike Genius Award - Manic Street Preachers
- Best British Band - Arctic Monkeys
- Best International Band - The Killers
- Best Solo Artist - Kate Nash
- Best Live Band - Muse
- Best New Band - The Enemy
- Best Album - Klaxons - Myths of the Near Future
- Best Track - Arctic Monkeys - "Fluorescent Adolescent"
- Best Dancefloor Filler - The Wombats - "Let's Dance to Joy Division"
- Best Video - Arctic Monkeys - "Teddy Picker"
- Best Music DVD - Nirvana - MTV Unplugged in New York
- Best Live Event - Carling Weekend: Reading and Leeds Festivals
- Best TV Show - The Mighty Boosh
- Best Radio Show - Zane Lowe (BBC Radio 1)
- Best Film - Control
- Sexiest Woman - Kylie Minogue
- Sexiest Man - Noel Fielding
- Worst Album - Britney Spears - Blackout
- Worst Band - The Hoosiers
- Best Dressed - Noel Fielding
- Worst Dressed - Amy Winehouse
- Hero of the year - Pete Doherty
- Villain of the Year - George W. Bush
- Best Live Venue - Wembley Stadium
- Best Website (excluding NME.com) - Facebook
- John Peel Award For Musical Innovation - Radiohead
- Philip Hall Radar Award - Glasvegas

=== NME Awards USA ===
Host: Jim Jefferies & Har Mar Superstar

The award party took place at the El Rey Theatre on 23 April 2008.

The winners were:

- Best American Alternative/Indie Band: The Killers
  - Foo Fighters
  - Kings of Leon
  - My Chemical Romance
  - The White Stripes
- Best American Alternative/Indie Live Act: My Chemical Romance
  - Foo Fighters
  - The Killers
  - Kings of Leon
  - Queens of the Stone Age
- Best American Alternative/Indie Solo Artist: Albert Hammond Jr.
  - Andrew Bird
  - Beck
  - Cat Power
  - Ryan Adams
- Best American Alternative/Indie New Band: Vampire Weekend
  - Band of Horses
  - Black Kids
  - MGMT
  - Paramore
- Best American Alternative/Indie New Live Act: Vampire Weekend
  - Band of Horses
  - Black Kids
  - MGMT
  - Santigold
- Best American Alternative/Indie New Solo Artist: Mark Ronson
  - Cass McCombs
  - Sam Sparro
  - Santigold
  - Seasick Steve
- Best American Alternative/Indie Album: Foo Fighters, Echoes, Silence, Patience & Grace
  - The Hold Steady, Boys and Girls in America
  - The Killers, Sawdust
  - Kings of Leon, Because of the Times
  - The White Stripes, Icky Thump
- Best American Alternative/Indie Track: The Killers, "Tranquilize"
  - Foo Fighters, "The Pretender"
  - LCD Soundsystem, "All My Friends"
  - My Chemical Romance, "Teenagers"
  - The White Stripes, "Icky Thump"
- Best International Alternative/Indie Band: Arcade Fire
  - Arctic Monkeys
  - Muse
  - Oasis
  - Radiohead
- Best International Alternative/Indie Live Act: Arcade Fire
  - Arctic Monkeys
  - The Cribs
  - Kaiser Chiefs
  - Muse
- Best International Alternative/Indie Solo Artist: Kate Nash
  - Amy Winehouse
  - Feist
  - Jamie T
  - M.I.A.
- Best International Alternative/Indie New Band: Klaxons
  - The Enemy
  - Foals
  - The Last Shadow Puppets
  - The Wombats
- Best International Alternative/Indie New Live Act: Klaxons
  - CSS
  - Foals
  - The Pigeon Detectives
  - The Wombats
- Best International Alternative/Indie New Solo Artist: Kate Nash
  - Dev Hynes
  - Duffy
  - Jack Peñate
  - Lily Allen
- Best International Alternative/Indie Album: Arctic Monkeys, Favourite Worst Nightmare
  - Arcade Fire, Neon Bible
  - Babyshambles, Shotter's Nation
  - Klaxons, Myths of the Near Future
  - Radiohead, In Rainbows
- Best International Alternative/Indie Track: Klaxons, "Golden Skans"
  - Arcade Fire, "Intervention"
  - Arctic Monkeys, "Teddy Picker"
  - Bloc Party, "Flux"
  - Kate Nash, "Foundations"
- Best Alternative/Indie Music Video: Justice, "D.A.N.C.E."
  - Arctic Monkeys, "Fluorescent Adolescent"
  - Foo Fighters, "Long Road to Ruin"
  - The Killers, "Tranquilize"
  - Oasis, "Lord Don't Slow Me Down"
- Best Film: Juno
  - Control
  - No Country for Old Men
  - The Simpsons Movie
  - There Will Be Blood
- Best Television: Heroes
  - Grey's Anatomy
  - Lost
  - The Mighty Boosh
  - The Office
- Best Alternative/Indie Breakthrough Artist: Santigold
- Best Alternative/Indie Breakthrough Track: MGMT, "Time to Pretend"
- Classic Album: The Lemonheads, It's a Shame About Ray
- Godlike Genius Award: Jane's Addiction
- Inspiration Award: Mick Jones

=== Shockwaves NME Awards 2009 ===
Host: Mark Watson

The awards took place at the Brixton Academy on 25 February 2009.

The 2009 winners were:

- Godlike Genius Award - The Cure
- Outstanding Contribution To Music - Elbow
- Best British Band - Oasis
- Best International Band - The Killers
- Best Solo Artist - Pete Doherty
- Best Live Band - Muse
- Best New Band - MGMT
- Best Album - Kings of Leon – Only By The Night
- Best Track - MGMT – "Time to Pretend"
- Best Dancefloor Filler - Dizzee Rascal & Calvin Harris – "Dance Wiv Me"
- Best Video - The Last Shadow Puppets – "My Mistakes Were Made For You"
- Best DVD - Arctic Monkeys – Arctic Monkeys Live at the Apollo
- Best Live Event - Glastonbury Festival
- Best TV Show - The Mighty Boosh
- Worst TV Show - Big Brother
- Best Website - youtube.com
- Best Venue - London Astoria
- Worst Album - Jonas Brothers - A Little Bit Longer
- Worst Band - Jonas Brothers
- Villain of the Year - George W. Bush
- Best Dressed - Alexa Chung
- Worst Dressed - Amy Winehouse
- Sexiest Man - Matt Bellamy
- Sexiest Woman - Hayley Williams
- Best Album Artwork - Muse - HAARP
- Best Blog - Noel Gallagher
- Philip Hall Radar Award - The Big Pink

=== Shockwaves NME Awards 2010 ===
Host: Jarvis Cocker

Performances:

- Kasabian with Noel Fielding - "Vlad the Impaler"
- The Specials - "Too Much Too Young"
- Biffy Clyro featuring Marina Diamandis - "Many of Horror"
- The Big Pink with Lily Allen - "Dominos"

The awards took place at the Brixton Academy on 24 February 2010.

The 2010 winners were:

- Godlike Genius Award - Paul Weller
- Outstanding Contribution To Music - The Specials
- Best British Band - Muse
- Best International Band - Paramore
- Best Solo Artist - Jamie T
- Best New Band - Bombay Bicycle Club
- Best Live Band - Arctic Monkeys
- Best Album - Kasabian - West Ryder Pauper Lunatic Asylum
- Best Track - The Big Pink - "Dominos"
- Best Video - Biffy Clyro - "The Captain"
- Best Live Event - Blur, Hyde Park
- Best Festival - Glastonbury Festival
- Best TV Show - The Inbetweeners
- Best Film - Inglourious Basterds
- Best Dancefloor Filler - La Roux - "In for the Kill (Skream Remix)"
- Best DVD - Boosh Live - Future Sailors Tour
- Hero of the Year - Rage Against the Machine
- Villain of the Year - Kanye West
- Best Dressed - Lady Gaga
- Worst Dressed - Lady Gaga
- Worst Album - Jonas Brothers - Lines, Vines and Trying Times
- Worst Band - Jonas Brothers
- Hottest Man - Matt Bellamy
- Hottest Woman - Karen O
- Best Website - Muse.mu
- Best Album Artwork - Kasabian - West Ryder Pauper Lunatic Asylum
- Best Band Blog - Radiohead (Radiohead.com/deadairspace)
- Giving It Back Fan Award - Lily Allen for her Twitter ticket treasure hunt
- Phillip Hall Radar Award - The Drums

=== Shockwaves NME Awards 2011 ===
Host: Angelos Epithemiou

Performances:

- My Chemical Romance - "Na Na Na (Na Na Na Na Na Na Na Na Na)"
- Hurts - "Wonderful Life"
- PJ Harvey - "The Words That Maketh Murder"
- Crystal Castles - "Baptism"
- Foo Fighters - The band were asked to play a 3-song set, but instead decided to play a 2-hour set. Opening with a cover of "Young Man Blues" with Roger Daltrey of The Who on vocals, they then played their latest album Wasting Light in full, followed by a compilation of 9 their biggest hits.

The awards took place at the Brixton Academy on 23 February 2011.

The 2011 winners were:

- Godlike Genius Award - Dave Grohl
- John Peel Award for Innovation - Crystal Castles
- Philip Hall Radar Award - The Naked And Famous
- Outstanding Contribution To Music - PJ Harvey
- Best British Band - Muse
- Best International Band - My Chemical Romance
- Best Solo Artist - Laura Marling
- Best New Band - Hurts
- Best Live Band - Biffy Clyro
- Best Album - Arcade Fire – The Suburbs
- Best Track - Foals – "Spanish Sahara"
- Best Video - My Chemical Romance – "Na Na Na (Na Na Na Na Na Na Na Na Na)"
- Best Festival - Glastonbury
- Best TV Show - Skins
- Best Film - Inception
- Best Dancefloor Filler - Professor Green – "Jungle"
- Hero of the Year - Lady Gaga
- Villain of the Year - David Cameron
- Most Stylish - Brandon Flowers
- Least Stylish - Justin Bieber
- Worst Album - Justin Bieber – My World
- Worst Band - Jonas Brothers
- Hottest Man - Matt Bellamy
- Hottest Woman - Alison Mosshart
- Best Album Artwork - Klaxons – Surfing The Void
- Best Band Blog or Twitter - Hayley Williams
- Best Book - John Lydon – Mr Rotten's Scrapbook
- Best Small Festival (50,000 capacity or lower) - RockNess

=== NME Awards 2012 ===
- Godlike Genius Award – Noel Gallagher
- Outstanding Contribution to Music – Pulp
- Best British Band – Kasabian
- Best International Band – Foo Fighters
- Best Solo Artist – Florence + the Machine
- Best New Band – The Vaccines
- Best Live Band – Arctic Monkeys
- Best Album – The Horrors – Skying
- Best Track – Florence + the Machine – Shake It Out
- Best Video – Hurts – Sunday
- Best Festival – Glastonbury Festival
- Best TV Show – Fresh Meat
- Best Film – Submarine
- Best Music Film – Back and Forth
- Dancefloor Anthem – Katy B – Broken Record
- Hero of the Year – Matt Bellamy
- Villain of the Year – Justin Bieber
- Worst Album – Justin Bieber - Under the Mistletoe
- Worst Band – One Direction
- Hottest Man – Jared Leto
- Hottest Woman – Hayley Williams
- Best Album Artwork – Friendly Fires - Pala
- Best Band Blog or Twitter – @Lady Gaga (Lady Gaga)
- Most Dedicated Fans – Muse
- Best Book – Noel Fielding – The Scribblings of a Madcap Shambleton
- Best Small Festival – RockNess
- Best Reissue – The Smiths – Complete Re-issues
- Greatest Music Moment of the Year – The Stone Roses reunite

=== NME Awards 2013 ===
Host: Russell Kane

- Godlike Genius Award – Johnny Marr
- Philip Hall Radar Award – The Child of Lov
- Teenage Cancer Trust Outstanding Contribution to Music – The Cribs
- Best British Band – One Direction
- Best International Band – The Killers
- Best Solo Artist – Florence + the Machine
- Best New Band – Palma Violets
- Best Live Band – The Rolling Stones
- Best Album – The Maccabees – Given to the Wild
- Best Track – Foals – Inhaler
- Best Video – Arctic Monkeys – R U Mine?
- Best Festival – Reading and Leeds Festivals
- Best TV Show – Fresh Meat
- Best Film – The Hobbit: An Unexpected Journey
- Best Music Film – Crossfire Hurricane
- Dancefloor Anthem – Calvin Harris feat. Florence Welch – Sweet Nothing
- Hero of the Year – Barack Obama
- Villain of the Year – Harry Styles
- Worst Band – One Direction
- Hottest Man – Matt Bellamy
- Hottest Woman – Amy Lee
- Best Band Blog or Twitter – @babyhaim (Alana Haim)
- Best Fan Community – Muse
- Best Book – Mike Skinner – The Story of the Streets
- Best Small Festival – Festival No 6
- Best Reissue – Blur – 21
- Greatest Music Moment of the Year – 2012 Summer Olympics opening ceremony

=== NME Awards 2014 ===
Host: Huw Stephens

- Godlike Genius Award - Blondie
- Songwriters’ Songwriter - Paul McCartney
- Award For Innovation - Damon Albarn
- Teenage Cancer Trust Outstanding Contribution to Music Award - Belle and Sebastian
- Best British Band - Arctic Monkeys
- Best International Band - Haim
- Best Solo Artist - Lily Allen
- Best New Band - Drenge
- Best Live Band - One Direction
- Best Album - Arctic Monkeys - AM
- Best Track - Disclosure - "White Noise"
- Best Music Video - Eagulls - "Nerve Endings"
- Best Festival - Glastonbury Festival
- Best TV Show - Breaking Bad
- Best Music Film - The Stone Roses: Made of Stone
- Philip Hall Radar Award - Fat White Family
- Best Reissue - The Clash - Sound System
- Best Band Blog Or Twitter - Alana Haim, Haim
- Best Book - Morrissey - Autobiography
- Best Small Festival - Sŵn
- Best Fan Community - Arctic Monkeys
- Music Moment of the Year - Noel and Damon come together for Teenage Cancer Trust
- Worst Band - The 1975
- Hero of the Year - Alex Turner
- Villain of the Year - Harry Styles

=== NME Awards 2015 ===
- Godlike Genius Award: Suede
- Best British Band: Kasabian
- Best Album: Kasabian – 48:13
- Best International Band: Foo Fighters
- Best Live Band: Royal Blood
- Best New Band: Royal Blood
- Best Solo Artist: Jake Bugg
- Best Festival: Glastonbury
- Best Track: Jamie T – "Zombie"
- Best Video: Jamie T – "Zombie"
- Best Music Film: Pulp: A Film About Life, Death and Supermarkets
- Best Film: Northern Soul
- Best TV Show: Game of Thrones
- Dancefloor Filler: Iggy Azalea featuring Charli XCX – "Fancy"
- Worst Band: 5 Seconds of Summer
- Villain of the Year: Nigel Farage
- Hero of the Year: Alex Turner
- Music Moment of the Year: Jamie T's comeback
- Best Fan Community: Muse
- Small Festival of the Year: Liverpool Psych Fest
- Book of the Year: Viv Albertine – Clothes, Clothes, Clothes. Music, Music, Music. Boys, Boys, Boys
- Reissue of the Year: Manic Street Preachers – The Holy Bible
- Best Band Social Media: Liam Gallagher's Twitter
- Philip Hall Radar Award: Dean Blunt

=== NME Awards 2016 ===
- Godlike Genius Award: Coldplay
- Best British Band: The Maccabees
- Best International Band: Run the Jewels
- Best New Artist: Rat Boy
- Best British Solo Artist: Charli XCX
- Best International Solo Artist: Taylor Swift
- Best Live Band: Wolf Alice
- Best Album: Foals – What Went Down
- Best Track: Wolf Alice – "Giant Peach"
- Best TV Show: This is England '90
- Best Film: Beasts of No Nation
- Best Music Film: Blur: New World Towers
- Best Music Video: Slaves – "Cheer Up London"
- Best Actor: Idris Elba
- Best Actress: Vicky McClure
- Best Reissue: David Bowie – Five Years (1969–1973)
- Best Book: Patti Smith – M Train
- Best Festival: Glastonbury
- Best Small Festival: End of the Road
- Music Moment of the Year: The Libertines secret Glastonbury set
- Best Fan Community: The Libertines
- Worst Band: 5 Seconds of Summer
- Villain of the Year: Donald Trump
- Hero of the Year: Dave Grohl
- Vlogger of the Year: KSI
- Innovation Award: Bring Me the Horizon

=== NME Awards 2017 ===
- Godlike Genius Award: Pet Shop Boys
- Best British Band: Biffy Clyro
- Best International Band: Metallica
- Best New Artist: Dua Lipa
- Best British Female Artist: M.I.A.
- Best British Male Artist: Skepta
- Best International Female Artist: Christine and the Queens
- Best International Male Artist: Frank Ocean
- Best Festival Headliner: Adele
- Best Live Band: The 1975
- Best Album: Bastille – Wild World
- Best Track: Christine and the Queens – "Tilted"
- Best TV Show: Fleabag
- Best Film: My Scientology Movie
- Best Music Film: Oasis: Supersonic
- Best Music Video: Slaves – "Consume or Be Consumed"
- Best Reissue: Oasis – Be Here Now
- Best Book: Johnny Marr – Set the Boy Free
- Best Festival: Glastonbury Festival
- Best Small Festival: End of the Road
- Music Moment of the Year: Coldplay's Viola Beach tribute at Glastonbury
- Worst Band: 5 Seconds of Summer
- Villain of the Year: Nigel Farage
- Hero of the Year: Beyoncé
- Outstanding Contribution To Music: Wiley

=== NME Awards 2018 ===
- Godlike Genius Award: Liam Gallagher
- Best British Band: alt-J
- Best New Artist: Stefflon Don
- Best Live Artist: Kasabian
- Best Track: Charli XCX - "Boys"
- Best International Band: Haim
- Best Mixtape: Avelino - "No Bullshit"
- Best Album: J Hus - "Common Sense"
- Best Collaboration: Craig David ft. Bastille - "I Know You"
- Best Festival: Glastonbury Festival
- Best Film: Baby Driver
- Best Music Video: The Big Moon - "Sucker"
- Under the Radar Award - Pale Waves
- Best Festival Headliner - Muse
- Best International Solo Artist: Lorde
- NME Icon: Shirley Manson
- NME Innovation Award: Boy Better Know
- Best Book: Wiley - Eskiboy
- Best TV Show: Stranger Things
- Best Reissue: Radiohead - "OK Computer OKNOTOK 1997 2017"
- Best Small Festival: Festival N°6
- Music Moment of the Year: One Love Manchester
- Best Music Film: Gaga: Five Foot Two
- Hero of the Year: Ariana Grande
- Villain of the Year: Piers Morgan

=== NME Awards 2020 ===
- Godlike Genius Award: Emily Eavis
- Songwriter of the Decade: Robyn
- Best British Band: The 1975
- Best Band in the World: Slipknot
- Band of the Decade: The 1975
- Best New British Act: Easy Life
- Best New Act in the World: Clairo
- Best British Song: AJ Tracey - "Ladbroke Grove"
- Best Song in the World: Billie Eilish - "Bad Guy"
- Best British Album: Little Simz - Grey Area
- Best Album in the World: Lana Del Rey - Norman Fucking Rockwell!
- Best British Solo Act: FKA twigs
- Best Solo Act in the World: Taylor Swift
- Best Live Act: Foals
- Best Collaboration: Mura Masa and Slowthai - "Deal Wiv It"
- Best British Festival: Glastonbury
- Best Festival in the World: Glastonbury
- Best Small Festival: End of the Road
- Best Film: Blue Story
- Best Film Actor: Taron Egerton
- Best Music Video: Yungblud - "Original Me"
- Under the Radar Award: Beabadoobee
- Best Festival Headliner: The Cure
- NME Icon: Courtney Love
- Best Book: Debbie Harry - Face It: A Memoir
- Best TV Show: Peaky Blinders
- Best TV Actor: Jessica Barden
- Best Reissue: Muse - Origin of Muse
- Best Music Film: Liam Gallagher - As It Was
- Best Podcast: Have You Heard George's Podcast?
- Best Game: Star Wars Jedi: Fallen Order
- Best Music Moment of the year: BTS

- Songwriter Award: Jack Antonoff
- Villain of the Year: Jacob Rees-Mogg
- Hero of the Year: Tomorrow X Together
- Innovation Award: Halsey
- Best Band From The UK: Bring Me the Horizon
- Best Band in the World: Fontaines D.C.
- Best New Act From The UK: Berwyn
- Best New Act in the World: Olivia Rodrigo
- Best Song By A UK Artist: Chvrches - "How Not To Drown"
- Best Song in the World: Lorde - "Solar Power"
- Best Album By A UK Artist: Sam Fender - Seventeen Going Under
- Best Album in the World: Sam Fender - Seventeen Going Under
- Best Solo Act From The UK: Little Simz
- Best Solo Act in the World: Burna Boy
- Best Live Act: Rina Sawayama
- Best Collaboration: Griff and Sigrid - "Head On Fire"
- Best Festival In The UK: Leeds & Reading Festivals
- Best Festival in the World: Life Is Beautiful
- Best Small Festival: Wide Awake
- Best Film: Last Night in Soho
- Best Film Actor: Alana Haim
- Best Mixtape: Holly Humberstone The Walls Are Way Too Thin
- Best Music Video: Foals - "Wake Me Up"
- Best Producer: Nia Archives
- NME Radar Award: Griff
- Best Festival Headliner: Wolf Alice
- Best Music Book: Bobby Gillespie - Tenement Kid
- Best TV Series: Feel Good
- Best TV Actor: Aisling Bea
- Best Reissue: Taylor Swift - Red (Taylor's Version)
- Best Music Film: The Sparks Brothers
- Best Podcast: Table Manners
- Game Of The Year: Metroid Dread
- Indie Game of the Year: Unpacking (video game)
- Best Game Development Studio: Double Fine
- Best Ongoing Game: Final Fantasy XIV
- Best Audio in a Game: Forza Horizon 5
- Music Moment Of The Year: Liam Gallagher's Free Concert for NHS Workers
