= C. J. Harris (singer) =

American singer-songwriter (1991–2023)

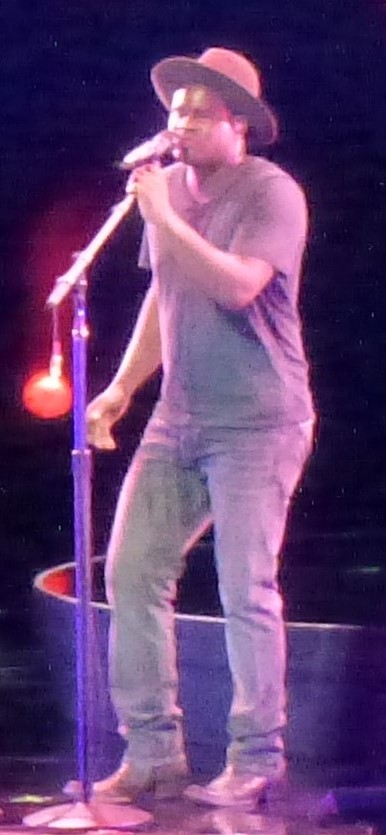
- Harris in 2014

Background information
- Born: Curtis Harris; January 28, 1991; Jasper, Alabama, U.S.
- Died: January 15, 2023 (aged 31) Jasper, Alabama
- Genres: Country; southern rock; blues rock
- Occupation: Singer
- Instruments: Vocals, guitar
- Years active: 2014–2023

Curtis "CJ" Harris (January 28, 1991 – January 15, 2023) was an American singer and songwriter from Jasper, Alabama, who finished in sixth place on the thirteenth season of American Idol in 2014. His first and only single, "In Love", was released in 2019. Before appearing on American Idol, he self-released the album Small Town Boy.

== Early life and career ==
Raised in Jasper, Alabama, Harris spent his summers working for his grandfather, whom he credited as a mentor. At age eight, he started learning the guitar on a broken one gifted to him from his grandfather; it only had three strings. Harris also played piano. His earliest music influences included Usher, Keith Sweat, and Darius Rucker. He also cited Ray LaMontagne, The Allman Brothers Band, John Legend, John Mayer, and Keith Urban as some of his favorite music artists. Harris was in church choir growing up. His singing was mostly self-taught, and his own musical style was described by AL.com in 2014 as "Earthy roots rock, with blues and country influences." Harris said that he considered his style similar to The Civil Wars.

The first American Idol audition Harris attended was in 2010. Before placing on the thirteenth season of the series in 2014, he auditioned unsuccessfully for The X-Factor and The Voice. Shortly after reaching the finals on American Idol, he reflected on his mindset going into the season 13 auditions, telling The Hollywood Reporter, "I saw they were doing the bus tour and they were going to be 30 minutes down the road from me. I said, 'You know what? I'm going to give it another chance. I've gotten so much better, my voice has matured and my playing has gotten so much better. I'm 23, before you know it I'll be 33 and I want to give it another chance.' " At the time of that audition, Harris worked at a barbecue restaurant and as a guitar teacher. His father died shortly before the start of American Idol's thirteenth season. By that point, Harris had already recorded an album titled Small Town Boy as an independent musician.

== American Idol ==
Harris attended the bus tour auditions for American Idol's thirteenth season in Tuscaloosa. He then auditioned before the judges in Salt Lake City. His audition performance of "Soulshine" was well-received, and in response, Keith Urban, a judge that year, said of Harris, "You sing 'cause you have to sing, not 'cause you want to sing. And I mean that in the deepest way. And that's why it's so believable and real." For the group rounds, Harris joined with the season's eventual winner, Caleb Johnson for a performance of Alex Clare's "Too Close". Before advancing to the semi-finals, Harris was one of a few contestants paired together for an impromptu sing-off. Harris was paired with Casey Thrasher, and the judges intended to only put one of them through to the next round. The judges were impressed with both performances however – Harris sang "Whipping Post" – and both contestants were put through.

In the semi-finals, Harris failed to receive enough votes to automatically advance into the finals. He was kept in the competition when the judges chose him as a Wild Card. Critics noted that Harris struggled with pitch in some of his performances. Harris received mostly positive attention for his participation on the series though; Mary Colurso of AL.com wrote that Harris was well-liked on the series for his "real-deal authenticity and good-guy appeal", while Maura Johnston of Vulture called Harris "a blast of charisma and unexpected song choices".

Harris reached the Top 10 alongside Dexter Roberts, a friend he had already known for several years from the Alabama music scene. The two of them auditioned together in Tuscaloosa. Harris borrowed Roberts' guitar for that audition, as his own guitar had broken a string during the wait in line. After finishing in sixth and seventh place respectively, Harris and Roberts returned to the American Idol stage for the season 13 finale, where they performed together alongside Darius Rucker.

Common opinion among critics was that Harris gave his best performance on American Idol when he covered "Can't You See" by The Marshall Tucker Band. Michael Slezak of TVLine called that performance "gritty" and "emotionally-connected", Dave Holmes of Vulture called it "lived-in and emotional and warm", and Colurso described it as "Rough-edged and raspy, imbued with real-deal emotion." Doug Gray, an original member of The Marshall Tucker Band, praised Harris' rendition of "Can't You See". Harris himself considered it to be one of his two best performances on American Idol, along with his rendition of John Mayer's "Gravity".

Episode	Theme	Song choice	Original artist	Order	Result
Audition	Auditioner's Choice	"Soulshine"	The Allman Brothers Band	N/A	Advanced
Hollywood Round, Part 1	A Capella	"Trouble"	Ray LaMontagne	N/A	Advanced
Hollywood Round, Part 2	Group Performance	"Too Close" with Tyler Ahlgren, Matthew Hamel, and Caleb Johnson	Alex Clare	N/A	Advanced
Hollywood Round, Part 3	Solo	"Bring It On Home to Me"	Sam Cooke	N/A	Advanced
Top 20 (10 Men)	Personal Choice	"Shelter"	Ray LaMontagne	2	Wild Card
Wild Card	Hollywood Solo	"Bring It On Home to Me"	Sam Cooke	1	Advanced
Top 13	This Is Me	"Radio"	Darius Rucker	5	Safe
Top 12	Home	"Waiting on the World to Change"	John Mayer	8	Safe
Top 11	Songs from the Movies	"Can't You See"	The Marshall Tucker Band	3	Safe
Top 10	Billboard Top 10	"Invisible"	Hunter Hayes	7	Safe
Top 9	I'm with the Band!	"If It Hadn't Been for Love"	The SteelDrivers	7	Bottom 3^{1}
Top 8	Back to the Start	Solo "Soulshine"	The Allman Brothers Band	2	Bottom 3^{2}
Top 8	Back to the Start	Duet "Alright" with Dexter Roberts	Darius Rucker	10	Bottom 3^{2}
Top 8^{3}	Songs from the 1980s	Duet "I Knew You Were Waiting (For Me)" with Malaya Watson	Aretha Franklin & George Michael	8	Bottom 2^{4}
Top 8^{3}	Songs from the 1980s	Solo "Free Fallin'"	Tom Petty	11	Bottom 2^{4}
Top 7	Competitors' Choice	Solo "Gravity"	John Mayer	4	Safe
Top 7	Competitors' Choice	Trio "Compass" with Jessica Meuse and Dexter Roberts	Lady Antebellum	9	Safe
Top 6	Rock 'n' Roll	"American Woman"	The Guess Who	3	Eliminated
Top 6	Country	"Whatever It Is"	Zac Brown Band	11	Eliminated

- ^Note 1 When Ryan Seacrest announced the results in this particular night, Harris was among the bottom 3, but was declared safe, as Majesty Rose was eliminated.
- ^Note 2 When Ryan Seacrest announced the results in this particular night, Harris was among the bottom 3, but was declared safe, as Sam Woolf was saved by the judges.
- ^Note 3 Due to the judges using their one save on Sam Woolf, the top 8 remained intact for another week.
- ^Note 4 When Ryan Seacrest announced the results in this particular night, Harris was among the bottom 2, but was declared safe, as Malaya Watson was eliminated.

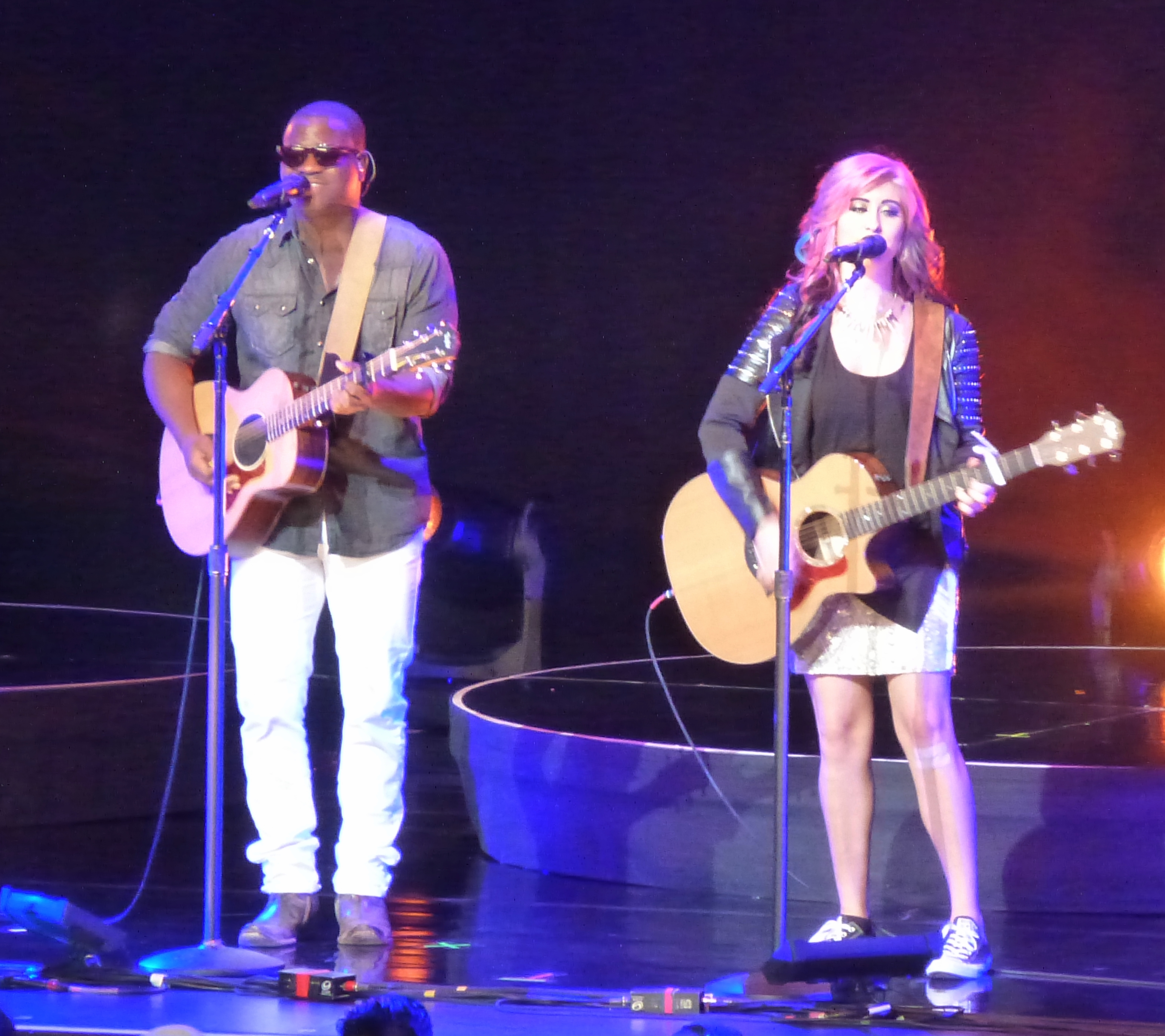
Harris performing with Jessica Meuse during the American Idol season 13 tour.

== Post-Idol ==
Shortly after his time on American Idol, Harris reunited with Darius Rucker for a performance at The Grand Ole Opry, participated in American Idol's season 13 tour, and performed at the 2014 Foothills Festival in his hometown of Jasper. He then moved to Nashville, where he became roommates for a time with his fellow season 13 finalists Alex Preston and Sam Woolf. In a post-Idol interview, Harris said that his preferred musical direction would be "a mix between country, blues, soul and Southern rock."

In 2019, Harris released his debut single, "In Love". At the time of his death in 2023, he was planning on releasing new music.

== Death ==
Harris died at a hospital in Jasper, Alabama, from a heart attack, on January 15, 2023, at the age of 31.

== Discography ==
=== Singles ===
Year	Song	Album
2019	"In Love"	Non-album single

=== American Idol digital singles ===
Year	Song	Album
2014	"Invisible"	Non-album single
2014	"If It Hadn't Been for Love"	Non-album single
2014	"Soulshine"	Non-album single
2014	"Free Fallin'"	Non-album single
2014	"Gravity"	Non-album single
2014	"American Woman"	Non-album single
