= American Idols Live! Tour 2014 =

2014 concert tour

- Tour by American Idol
- Top 10 contestants from season 13
- Start date: June 24, 2014
- End date: August 23, 2014
- No. of shows: 40

American Idol concert chronology
- American Idols Live! Tour 2013 (2013); American Idols Live! Tour 2014 (2014); American Idols Live! Tour 2015 (2015)

The American Idols Live! Tour 2014 was a concert tour that featured the Top 10 contestants of the thirteenth season of American Idol. The tour started on June 24, 2014, in Binghamton, New York and ended on August 23, 2014, in Redmond, Washington.

The size of the venues for this American Idol tour was smaller compared to previous years. The show scheduled for Albany, New York was canceled and the show in Syracuse was moved to a smaller venue. Unlike previous years, there was no live band, and the finalists performed to a backing track.

Dexter Roberts left the tour after appearing in only a few shows due to illness.

== Performers ==
Caleb Johnson (Winner)	Jena Irene (Runner-up)
Alex Preston (3rd place)	Jessica Meuse (4th place)
Sam Woolf (5th place)	C.J. Harris (6th place)
Dexter Roberts (7th place)	Malaya Watson (8th place)
Majesty Rose (9th place)	MK Nobilette (10th place)

=== Additional notes ===
Dexter Roberts did not appear in the show from July 1 onward. Later it was reported that he had left the tour by mutual agreement, and Roberts revealed that he was suffering from Rocky Mountain spotted fever he contracted from tick bites during a turkey hunt in Kentucky he attended soon after the thirteenth-season finale.

== Setlist ==
- "Counting Stars" by OneRepublic – Group
- "Fuckin' Perfect" by Pink – MK Nobilette with Malaya Watson and Jessica Meuse as backup
- "Tightrope" by Janelle Monáe – Majesty Rose with Jena Irene, Watson, and Meuse as backup
- "Cruise" by Florida Georgia Line – C.J. Harris and Dexter Roberts (C.J. Harris and Meuse after Roberts' departure)
- "When I Was Your Man" by Bruno Mars – Watson
- "Wake Me Up" by Avicii – Nobilette, Rose and Watson
- "Let Her Go" by Passenger – Alex Preston and Sam Woolf
- "Keep Your Hands to Yourself" by The Georgia Satellites – Roberts (dropped from the setlist after Roberts' departure)
- "Muckalee Creek Water" by Luke Bryan – Roberts (dropped from the setlist after Roberts' departure)
- "Pompeii" by Bastille – Preston with Harris and Woolf as backup
- "Gimme Shelter" by The Rolling Stones – Irene and Caleb Johnson
- "Gravity" by John Mayer – Harris with Preston as backup
- "American Woman" by The Guess Who – Harris with Irene, Meuse, and Preston on backup
- "Happy" by Pharrell Williams – Group

Intermission

- "Best Day of My Life" by American Authors and "Story of My Life" by One Direction – Group
- "We Are One" – Irene with Rose and Meuse
- "Can't Help Falling in Love" by Elvis Presley – Irene
- "My Body" by Young the Giant – Irene
- "Lego House" by Ed Sheeran – Woolf
- "Sail Away" by David Gray – Woolf
- "You and I" by Lady Gaga – Meuse with Irene, Rose and Watson on backup
- "Pumped Up Kicks" by Foster the People – Meuse with Rose and Woolf on backup
- "Fairytale" (Alex Preston) – Preston
- "Too Close" by Alex Clare – Preston
- "Family Tree" by Kings of Leon – Johnson
- "Maybe I'm Amazed" by Paul McCartney – Johnson with Rose, Watson and Woolf on backup
- "As Long As You Love Me" – Johnson with the girls on backup
- "Dazed and Confused" by Led Zeppelin – Johnson
- "Radioactive" by Imagine Dragons – Finale

== Tour dates ==
Date	City	Country	Venue	Tickets sold / available	Gross revenue
June 24, 2014	Binghamton	United States	Broome County Veterans Memorial Arena	—N/a	—N/a
June 27, 2014	Windsor	Canada	The Colosseum at Caesars	—N/a	—N/a
June 28, 2014	Orillia	Canada	Casino Rama Entertainment Centre	—N/a	—N/a
June 29, 2014	Syracuse	United States	Oncenter Complex	1,018 / 3,028 (34%)	$47,420
July 1, 2014	Highland Park	United States	Ravinia Pavilion	—N/a	—N/a
July 3, 2014	Cincinnati	United States	Pavilion at Horseshoe Casino	—N/a	—N/a
July 5, 2014	Mashantucket	United States	MGM Grand Theater	—N/a	—N/a
July 6, 2014	Wolf Trap	United States	Filene Center	—N/a	—N/a
July 8, 2014	West Long Branch	United States	Multipurpose Activity Center	1,482 / 2,463 (60%)	$84,687
July 9, 2014	Boston	United States	Blue Hills Bank Pavilion	—N/a	—N/a
July 11, 2014	Uniondale	United States	Nassau Coliseum	—N/a	—N/a
July 12, 2014	Bethlehem	United States	Sands Bethlehem Event Center	—N/a	—N/a
July 13, 2014	Durham	United States	Durham Performing Arts Center	2,100 / 2,712 (77%)	$93,051
July 15, 2014	Philadelphia	United States	Mann Center for the Performing Arts	1,981 / 4,564 (43%)	$65,433
July 17, 2014	Sarasota	United States	Van Wezel Performing Arts Hall	—N/a	—N/a
July 18, 2014	Clearwater	United States	Ruth Eckerd Hall	1,434 / 1,674 (86%)	$108,449
July 19, 2014	Fort Lauderdale	United States	Au-Rene Theater	964 / 2,561 (38%)	$67,474
July 20, 2014	St. Augustine	United States	St. Augustine Amphitheatre	—N/a	—N/a
July 22, 2014	Greenville	United States	Peace Concert Hall	—N/a	—N/a
July 24, 2014	Alpharetta	United States	Verizon Wireless Amphitheatre	—N/a	—N/a
July 25, 2014	New Orleans	United States	Saenger Theatre	—N/a	—N/a
July 26, 2014	Birmingham	United States	BJCC Concert Hall	1,960 / 2,608 (75%)	$114,254
July 28, 2014	San Antonio	United States	Majestic Theatre	—N/a	—N/a
July 29, 2014	Grand Prairie	United States	Verizon Theatre at Grand Prairie	—N/a	—N/a
July 30, 2014	Tulsa	United States	Brady Theater	—N/a	—N/a
August 1, 2014	Kansas City	United States	Midland Theatre	—N/a	—N/a
August 2, 2014	Mulvane	United States	Kansas Star Arena	—N/a	—N/a
August 3, 2014	Council Bluffs	United States	Harrah's Ballroom	—N/a	—N/a
August 6, 2014	Indianapolis	United States	Indiana State Fair	—N/a	—N/a
August 7, 2014	Mount Pleasant	United States	Soaring Eagle Entertainment Hall	—N/a	—N/a
August 8, 2014	Springfield	United States	Illinois State Fair	—N/a	—N/a
August 9, 2014	Prior Lake	United States	Mystic Showroom	—N/a	—N/a
August 11, 2014	Broomfield	United States	1stBank Center	—N/a	—N/a
August 13, 2014	Phoenix	United States	Comerica Theatre	—N/a	—N/a
August 14, 2014	Los Angeles	United States	Greek Theatre	2,826 / 5,764 (49%)	$88,649
August 16, 2014	Indio	United States	Fantasy Springs Special Events Center	—N/a	—N/a
August 17, 2014	San Jose	United States	City National Civic	1,822 / 3,016 (60%)	$94,117
August 20, 2014	Jacksonville	United States	Britt Pavilion	—N/a	—N/a
August 21, 2014	Portland	United States	Theater of the Clouds	2,492 / 6,354 (39%)	$67,996
August 23, 2014	Redmond	United States	Marymoor Park	—N/a	—N/a
Total				18,079 / 34,744 (52%)	$831,530
