= Dexter Roberts =

American singer-songwriter (born 1991)

- Born: July 12, 1991 (age 35); Fayette, Alabama, U.S.
- Genres: Country
- Occupation: Singer
- Instruments: Vocals, guitar
- Years active: 2008–present
- Label: First Launch Records

Dexter Roberts (born July 12, 1991) is an American singer and songwriter who first came to prominence in 2014 as the seventh place finalist on the thirteenth season of American Idol. In 2019, he placed third on the sixteenth season of The Voice. In between his appearances on American Idol and The Voice, he released two EPs.

== American Idol ==
Roberts performed "Drive" for his audition for American Idol, and for the group round he was part of the group Backstreet Cowboys together with Casey Thrasher and fellow finalist Ben Briley, performing the song "I Want It That Way". For the final solo he performed an original song, "Farmer's Grandson".

Episode	Theme	Song choice	Original artist	Order	Result
Audition	Auditioner's Choice	"Drive"	Casey James	N/A	Advanced
Hollywood Round, Part 1	A Capella	"Barton Hollow"	The Civil Wars	N/A	Advanced
Hollywood Round, Part 2	Group Performance	"I Want It That Way" with Ben Briley and Casey Thrasher	Backstreet Boys	N/A	Advanced
Hollywood Round, Part 3	Solo	"Farmer's Grandson" (original composition)	Dexter Roberts	N/A	Advanced
Top 31 (10 Men)	Personal Choice	"This Ole Boy"	Joe Nichols	6	Advanced
Top 13	This Is Me	"Aw Naw"	Chris Young	1	Safe
Top 12	Home	"Lucky Man"	Montgomery Gentry	4	Safe
Top 11	Songs from the Cinema	"Sweet Home Alabama"	Lynyrd Skynyrd	4	Safe
Top 10	Billboard Top 10	"Cruise"	Florida Georgia Line	2	Bottom 3 (Note: When Ryan Seacrest announced the results in this particular night, Roberts was among the bottom 3, but was declared safe second, as MK Nobilette was eliminated.)
Top 9	I'm with the Band!	"Boondocks"	Little Big Town	3	Safe
Top 8	Back to the Start	Solo "One Mississippi"	Brett Eldredge	7	Safe
Top 8	Back to the Start	Duet "Alright" with C.J. Harris	Darius Rucker	10	Safe
Top 8 (Note: Due to the judges using their one save on Sam Woolf, the top 8 remained intact for another week.)	Songs from the 1980s	Solo "Keep Your Hands to Yourself"	The Georgia Satellites	2	Safe
Top 8	Songs from the 1980s	Duet "Islands in the Stream" with Jessica Meuse	Kenny Rogers & Dolly Parton	10	Safe
Top 7	Competitors' Choice	Solo "Muckalee Creek Water"	Luke Bryan	5	Eliminated
Top 7	Competitors' Choice	Trio "Compass" with CJ Harris and Jessica Meuse	Lady Antebellum	9	Eliminated

Roberts, as a finalist, joined the American Idols LIVE! Tour 2014 after the show. However, he left the tour after a few shows by mutual agreement due to the illness. He had contracted Rocky Mountain spotted fever due to tick bites during a turkey hunt in Kentucky that he attended soon after the thirteenth-season finale.

== The Voice ==
Roberts was a contestant on the sixteenth season of The Voice on Blake Shelton's team. He earned four chairs in the blind auditions from celebrity coaches Shelton, Adam Levine, Kelly Clarkson and John Legend. He made it to the finale and finished in third place.

The Voice performances

Stage	Song	Original artist	Date	Order	Result
Blind Audition	"Like a Cowboy"	Randy Houser	4.10	March 4, 2019	Adam Levine, Kelly Clarkson, John Legend and Blake Shelton turned, joined Team Blake
Battle Rounds	"Hurricane"	Luke Combs	9.4	April 1, 2019	Defeated Dalton Dover. Advanced to the Live Cross Battles
Live Cross Battles	"Believe"	Brooks & Dunn	12.13	April 15, 2019	Defeated Andrew Jannakos. Advanced to the Live Playoffs
Live Playoffs (Top 24)	"Ain't Nothing 'Bout You"	Brooks & Dunn	16.24	April 29, 2019	Received enough public votes to advance. Advanced to the Quarterfinals (Top 13).
Live Quarterfinals (Top 13)	"Something Like That"	Tim McGraw	18.6	May 6, 2019	Received enough public votes to advance. Advanced to the Semi-finals (Top 8).
Live Semi-finals (Top 8)	"Here Without You"	3 Doors Down	20.7	May 13, 2019	Received enough public votes to advance. Advanced to the finals (Top 4).
Live Semi-finals (Top 8)	"Hey Jude" (Duet with Gyth Rigdon)	The Beatles	20.3	May 13, 2019	Received enough public votes to advance. Advanced to the finals (Top 4).
Live Finals (Top 4)	"Anything Goes"	Randy Houser	22.3	May 20, 2019	3rd Place
Live Finals (Top 4)	"Looking Back" (Original song)	Dexter Roberts	22.7	May 20, 2019	3rd Place
Live Finals (Top 4)	"Hard Workin' Man" (Duet with Blake Shelton)	Brooks & Dunn	22.10	May 20, 2019	3rd Place

== Career ==
Roberts signed with First Launch Records and released his first single, "Dream About Me," on March 12, 2015. He released a debut EP by the same title on March 24, 2015. In 2022, he released three singles: "Country As Country Comes", on February 10; "Friday Night" on March 10; and "Standing Knee Deep in a River" on May 19.

== Discography ==
=== EPs ===
Year	Title
2015	Dream About Me
2017	Dexter Roberts Unplugged, Vol. 1

=== Singles ===
Year	Song	Album
2015	"Dream About Me"	Dream About Me
2022	"Country As Country Comes"	
2022	"Friday Night"	
2022	"Standing Knee Deep in a River"	

=== American Idol and The Voice digital singles ===
Year	Song	Peak chart positions	Album
Year	Song	Country Digital Song Sales	Album
2014	"Cruise"	—	Non-album single
2014	"Boondocks"	—	Non-album single
2014	"One Mississippi"	—	Non-album single
2014	"Keep Your Hands to Yourself"	—	Non-album single
2014	"Muckalee Creek Water"	—	Non-album single
2019	"Ain't Nothing 'Bout You"	—	The Season 16 Collection (The Voice Performance)
2019	"Something Like That"	—	The Season 16 Collection (The Voice Performance)
2019	"Here Without You"	23	The Season 16 Collection (The Voice Performance)
2019	"Anything Goes"	—	The Season 16 Collection (The Voice Performance)
2019	"Hard Workin' Man"	—	The Season 16 Collection (The Voice Performance)
2019	"Looking Back"	—	The Season 16 Collection (The Voice Performance)
