= Alex Preston =

Alex Preston may refer to:

- Alex Preston (author), English author and journalist
- Alex Preston (singer), American singer-songwriter
