= Jessica Meuse =

American singer-songwriter (born 1990)

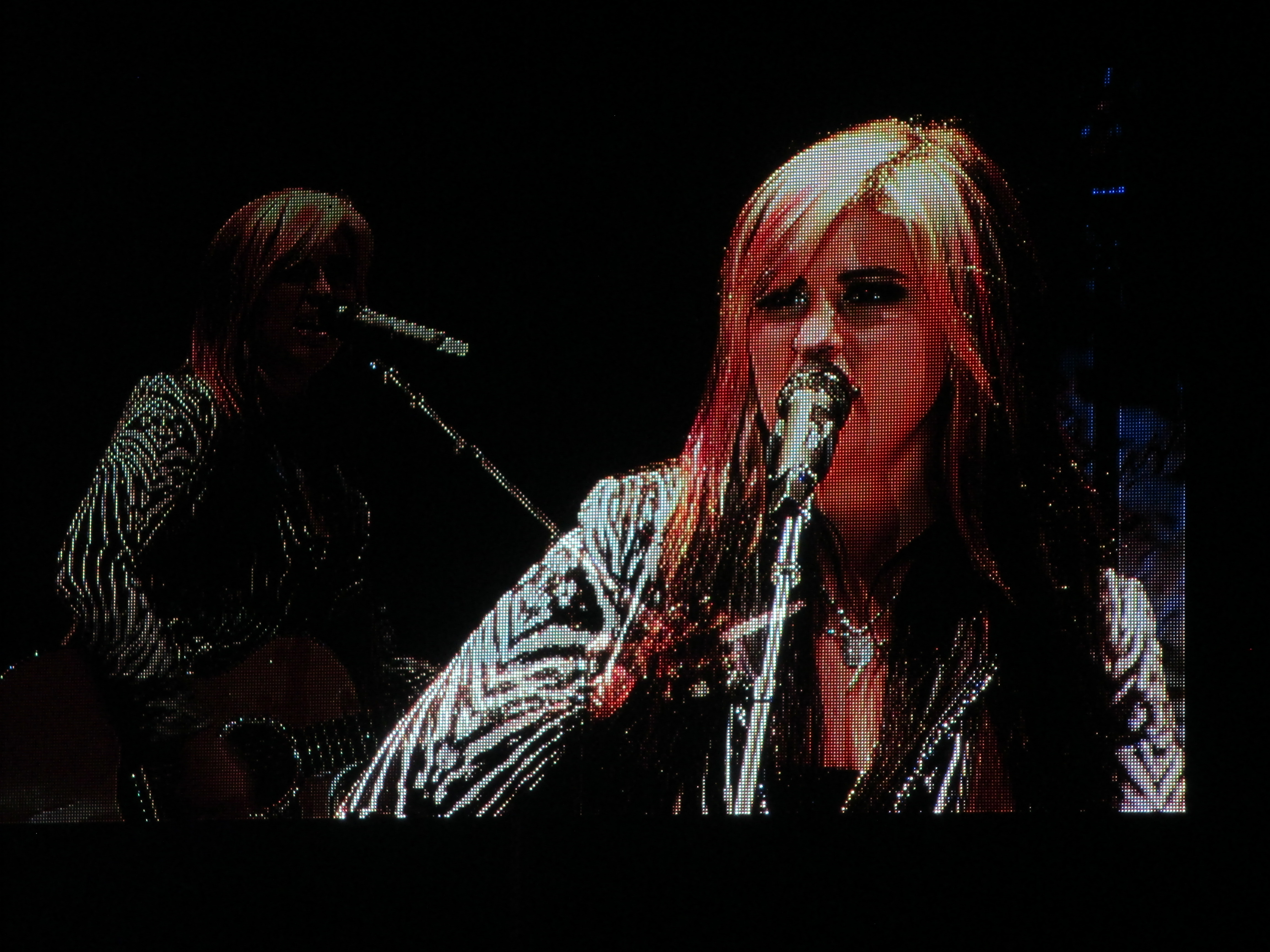
- Meuse performing on the American Idols Live! tour in Prior Lake, Minnesota, August 2014

Background information
- Born: Jessica Rose Meuse; October 19, 1990 (age 35); Round Rock, Texas, U.S.
- Origin: Slapout, Alabama
- Genres: Southern rock; blues rock; folk rock; country rock; alternative rock
- Occupations: Singer; songwriter
- Instruments: Vocals; guitar
- Years active: 2011–present
- Label: Independent
- Website: jessicameuse.com

Jessica Rose Meuse (born October 19, 1990), also known as Jess Meuse, is an American singer-songwriter from Slapout, Alabama. After several years of performing as an unsigned musician, she finished in fourth place on the 13th season of American Idol. Her debut album, What's So Hard About Bein' a Man, was self-released in 2011, three years before she received national exposure on reality television. While competing on American Idol, she became the first person in the history of the series to perform an original song during the finals. Her second album, Halfhearted, was released on August 3, 2018, through Warrior Records.

== Early life and education ==
Meuse was born in Round Rock, Texas on October 19, 1990, to Charles Edward and Sheila Arlene (Strobel) Meuse. Her mother's government job led to the family moving several times when she was a child. As a way to be more outgoing as a pre-teen, she recorded CDs and gave them to friends. While living in Zephyrhills, Florida in 2002, she attended St. Anthony Catholic School in nearby San Antonio, Florida, to the northwest.

Jessica Meuse said she performed publicly for the first time at a talent show at the school. When she was in the seventh grade, she moved to Slapout, Alabama, where she joined the Montgomery Youth Orchestra, eventually becoming principal second violin. She played solo shows at various festivals, fundraisers, schools, and public events. In addition to the violin, she plays guitar and piano. She attended Auburn University at Montgomery in Montgomery, Alabama where she majored in liberal arts.

== Musical influences ==
Meuse says she is "influenced by virtually every genre of music." Specifically, she has called her style "a blend of southern rock with alternative and rock n’ roll." Mary Colurso of AL.com said it is "rock...infused with country and metal." Meuse's musical influences include Coldplay, Miranda Lambert, Creedence Clearwater Revival, Stevie Nicks, Death Cab for Cutie, Bruno Mars, and Shinedown.

== Music career ==
=== Career beginnings and What's So Hard About Bein' a Man (2008–2014) ===
Meuse began writing music at 18. Her first song was called "What's So Hard About Bein' a Man". She self-released a CD with the same name in 2011 and had written around 60 original songs by the time of her American Idol audition.

In October 2010, Meuse won the Stars of Alabama Artist Showcase, a statewide music competition which was judged by professionals from Montgomery, Alabama; Atlanta, and Nashville. In October 2013, Meuse was featured by the Alabama Media Group in the Birmingham Sessions, an online showcase for musicians around the Birmingham, Alabama area. She auditioned for The Voice before her American Idol run, but did not pass the initial blind audition.

=== American Idol (2014) ===
While participating as a musical act in Vans Warped Tour, Meuse was encouraged by friends to audition for the 13th season of American Idol in Atlanta. She performed an original song called "Blue-Eyed Lie" and was advanced by all three judges. For her final Hollywood week performance, Meuse chose another original song called "Done." The judges were initially undecided between putting Meuse or Jesse Roach through to the top 30. To decide, the judges had Meuse and Roach do an impromptu sing-off. Meuse's performance of "Simple Man" (by Lynyrd Skynyrd) advanced her to the Top 30.

All of the contestants reprised their audition songs for top 8-week, giving Meuse the opportunity to sing "Blue Eyed Lie" again. That made her the first contestant in the history of American Idol to sing an original song during the finals. For top 4-week, she was originally going to sing another original song, called "The Hell You Put Me Through"–all of the contestants were going to sing originals for one of their performances that week. However, the producers changed their minds late in the week and gave the contestants a short amount of time to choose a replacement from a very limited list of songs. Meuse chose Pinks' "So What."

Meuse's fan base is known as "The Meuse Mafia." She jokingly refers to her experience on the show as being like the Hunger Games and in one of the American Idol shows she braided her hair in the same style as Katniss Everdeen. Several reviewers and journalists felt that Meuse was unfairly treated by the show including Annie Barrett, who wrote for TVLine that the judges were "just blatantly not rooting for her at all. Lyndsey Parker of Yahoo! Music concurred, writing that "it seemed like the judges and producers were doing their best" to get Meuse eliminated from the competition. She said that Meuse received "harsh critique" for praise-worthy performances, even as the judges overlooked significant flaws in other contestants. BuddyTV writer Jeff Dodge opined that Meuse was being held to an unfair "double standard." Writing for TV Guide, Liz Raftery assessed fan opinion as being "frustrat[ed]" with the judges over their poor treatment of Meuse.

Meuse was never among the "Bottom 3", until top 7-week, when the "Bottom 2" was composed of her and the eliminated contestant, Dexter Roberts. The next week, Meuse was again in the "Bottom 2", but C.J. Harris was eliminated. There was no bottom 2 for top 5-week. The contestants were offered a choice–if they agreed unanimously, the week's results would be discarded and all five of them would move on to perform again. Two of them would be eliminated a week later. Although Meuse voted in favor of the idea, the vote was not unanimous and Sam Woolf was eliminated. Meuse herself was eliminated during the show the next week. She came in fourth place and reprised her performance of "Blue Eyed Lie" as her exit song.

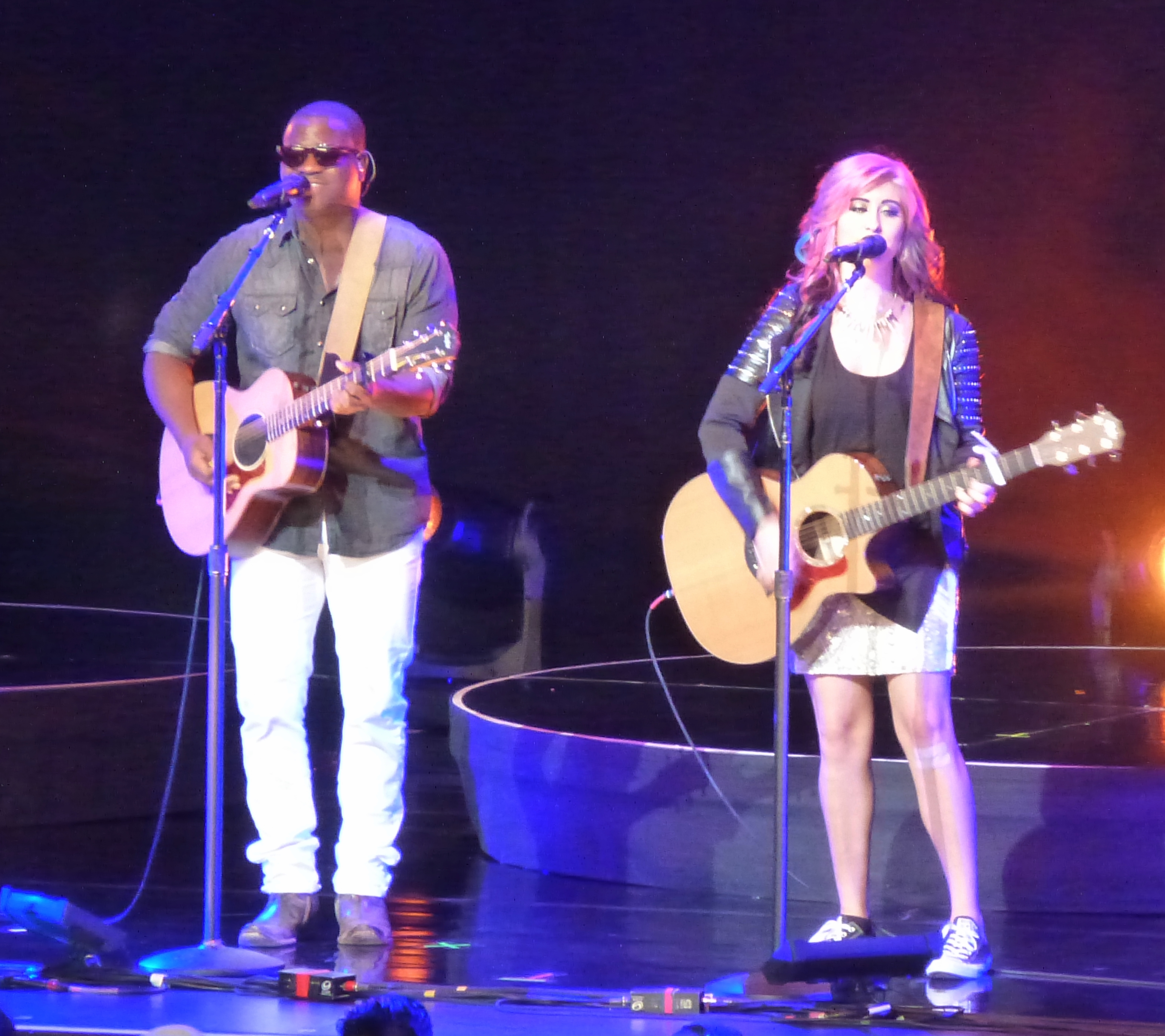
Meuse performing with C.J. Harris during the American Idol season 13 tour

Episode	Theme	Song choice	Original artist	Order	Result
Audition	Auditioner's Choice	"Blue-Eyed Lie"	Jessica Meuse	N/A	Advanced
Hollywood Round, Part 1	A Capella	Not aired	Not aired	N/A	Advanced
Hollywood Round, Part 2	Group Performance	"Single Ladies (Put a Ring on It)" with Stephanie Hanvey, Nica Nashae, and Cara Watson	Beyoncé	N/A	Advanced
Hollywood Round, Part 3	Solo	"Done"	Jessica Meuse	N/A	Advanced
Top 31 (10 Women)	Personal Choice	"Drink a Beer"	Luke Bryan	7	Advanced
Top 13	This is Me	"The Crow & the Butterfly"	Shinedown	10	Safe
Top 12	Home	"White Flag"	Dido	3	Safe
Top 11	Songs from the Cinema	"The Sound of Silence"	Simon & Garfunkel	2	Safe
Top 10	Billboard Top 10	"Pumped Up Kicks"	Foster the People	8	Safe
Top 9	I'm with the Band!	"Rhiannon"	Fleetwood Mac	6	Safe
Top 8	Back to the Start	Solo "Blue-Eyed Lie"	Jessica Meuse	1	Safe
Top 8	Back to the Start	Duet "Stop Draggin' My Heart Around" with Caleb Johnson	Stevie Nicks & Tom Petty	5	Safe
Top 8 (Note: Due to the judges using their one save on Sam Woolf, the top 8 remained intact for another week.)	Songs from the 1980s	Solo "Call Me"	Blondie	6	Safe
Top 8	Songs from the 1980s	Duet "Islands in the Stream" with Dexter Roberts	Kenny Rogers & Dolly Parton	10	Safe
Top 7	Competitors' Choice	Solo "Gunpowder & Lead"	Miranda Lambert	2	Bottom 2 (Note: When Ryan Seacrest announced the results in this particular night, Meuse was among the bottom 2, but was declared safe, as Dexter Roberts was eliminated.)
Top 7	Competitors' Choice	Trio "Compass" with C.J. Harris and Dexter Roberts	Lady Antebellum	9	Bottom 2
Top 6	Rock 'n' Roll	"Somebody to Love"	The Great Society	6	Bottom 2 (Note: When Ryan Seacrest announced the results in this particular night, Meuse was among the bottom 2, but was declared safe, as C.J. Harris was eliminated.)
Top 6	Country	"Jolene"	Dolly Parton	12	Bottom 2
Top 5	America's Requests	Solo "Human"	Christina Perri	4	Safe
Top 5	America's Requests	Duet "Beast of Burden" with Caleb Johnson	The Rolling Stones	7	Safe
Top 5	America's Requests	Solo "Summertime Sadness"	Lana Del Rey	11	Safe
Top 4	Love Songs	"Since U Been Gone"	Kelly Clarkson	2	Eliminated
Top 4	Love Songs	"So What"	Pink	6	Eliminated
Top 4	Love Songs	"You and I"	Lady Gaga	10	Eliminated

==== "Blue-Eyed Lie" ====
During her time on American Idol, Meuse was known for her original song "Blue-Eyed Lie". She had already gained positive attention for the song in Alabama a year earlier after performing it for an artist showcase held by the Alabama Media Group. At the time, Mary Colurso of AL.com commented on the song, calling it "confident and gritty". "Blue-Eyed Lie" was lauded by the press after Meuse performed it on American Idol. Jennifer Still of Digital Spy wrote that the song "absolutely rocks–literally and figuratively. It sounds like a song you could hear on the radio tomorrow", Lyndsey Parker of Yahoo! Music called Meuse's performance of the song "stellar", and Brian Mansfield of USA Today commended the song's "'60s garage-rock" sound. Michael Slezak of TVLine, who lauded the song for its gritty vocals and "stinging lyrics", ranked Meuse's live performance of "Blue-Eyed Lie" as being one of the 30 greatest moments in the history of American Idol.

=== Post-Idol and Halfhearted (2014–present) ===
Meuse returned to the American Idol stage for the season 13 finale, where she performed with Jennifer Nettles. She performed in the American Idol summer tour from June 24, 2014 to August 23. After the tour, Meuse went back to performing shows mostly in Alabama and Georgia, although she also played occasionally in California and Tennessee. In early 2015, she told The Hollywood Reporter that she had intentions of moving to Los Angeles. Her debut single, "Done," was released independently on April 21, 2015 and a second single, "Rio Grande", was released on January 5, 2016. Although Meuse expressed on Twitter in late 2016 that she considered Los Angeles to be her "second home", she continued to live primarily in Slapout until the end of 2016, when she moved to Houston accepting a position with the Lone Survivor Foundation. Around the same time, she announced that she had an EP in production. Within a few months, the EP was expanded into a full album. Titled Halfhearted, it was released through Warrior Records on August 3, 2018, as Meuse's first post-Idol album. All of the songs on Halfhearted were written by Meuse. The album reached the iTunes Top Ten Country Albums.

Four songs from Halfhearted were released as singles leading up to the album's release: "Love Her Better" on June 1, "High" on June 15, "California Dream" on June 29, and "Thank God It Didn't Work" on July 13. "Thank God It Didn't Work" was released to country radio and Taste of Country liked the song saying it is "a full-throated vocal showcase that demands your attention." Meuse left Warrior Records in 2019. Among the tracks on Halfhearted is "Without You", a duet between Meuse and Bo Bice. In June 2020, Fred Bronson of Billboard lauded "Without You" as being an "overlooked gem".

On April 15, 2020, Meuse premiered the song "Because You Love Me" as part of a virtual concert for Bethesda Lutheran Communities. She wrote the song for the organization and released it as a non-album single on September 18, 2020. A music video for the song was released later that month. A year later, Meuse spoke with Southwest News Media about the song, saying, "It can be about someone who loves somebody, about someone taking care of somebody; about the effect someone with different abilities has on their caretaker, or their family; it can be any kind of love; or it can be spiritual. For me, it’s my spirituality. A lot of times that’s what gets me through hardships and difficult times; when I am at the bottom, struggling."

== Personal life ==
Meuse calls herself a "very spiritual person" and has said she is motivated by her faith. She has over eight tattoos and designed at least seven of them herself. She has two on her right arm–one is a phoenix and one of a dove surrounded by three stars. She says they represent spiritual rebirth and the Holy Trinity. On her left arm, she has a tattoo of the word "Faith". After she and Jena Irene Asciutto participated in American Idol's 13th season together, they got matching tattoos of the Roman numeral XIII. Meuse loves animals and has many pets that were rescued from shelters, as well as several which she found abandoned.

Meuse's mother, Sheila, worked as the assistant director of the Central Alabama Veterans Health Care System, where in 2014, she became a whistleblower exposing mismanagement in the VA. Sheila Meuse's efforts and the VA's subsequent retaliation against her, have been chronicled by the Montgomery Advertiser and NPR.

== Discography ==
=== Albums ===
Title	Details
What's So Hard About Bein' a Man	Release date: 2011; Label: Independent; Formats: CD; Recorded and mixed by Tony Buenger at Guest House Studios in Eclectic, Alabama; Mastered by John Scrip at Massive Mastering in Schaumburg, Illinois
Halfhearted	Release date: August 3, 2018; Label: Warrior Records

=== Singles ===
Year	Song	Album
2015	"Done"	Non-album single
2016	"Rio Grande"	Non-album single
2018	"Love Her Better"	Halfhearted
2018	"High"	Halfhearted
2018	"California Dream"	Halfhearted
2018	"Thank God It Didn't Work"	Halfhearted
2020	"Because You Love Me"	Non-album single

=== American Idol digital singles ===
Year	Song	Album
2014	"Pumped Up Kicks"	Non-album single
2014	"Rhiannon"	Non-album single
2014	"Blue-Eyed Lie"	Non-album single
2014	"Call Me"	Non-album single
2014	"Gunpowder & Lead"	Non-album single
2014	"Jolene"	Non-album single
2014	"Summertime Sadness"	Non-album single
2014	"Yoü and I"	Non-album single
