= American Idol season 13 =

American Idol
- Season 13
- Hosted by: Ryan Seacrest
- Judges: Harry Connick Jr. Jennifer Lopez; Keith Urban
- Winner: Caleb Johnson
- Runner-up: Jena Irene
- Finals venue: Nokia Theatre L.A. Live

Release
- Original network: Fox
- Original release: January 15 – May 21, 2014

Season chronology
- ← Previous; Season 12 Next → Season 14

The thirteenth season of American Idol, styled as American Idol XIII, premiered on the Fox television network on January 15, 2014. Ryan Seacrest returned as host for his thirteenth season. Keith Urban was the only judge from the twelfth season to return. Former judge Jennifer Lopez, who returned after a one-season absence, and Harry Connick Jr. both joined the judging panel following the departures of Mariah Carey, Randy Jackson, and Nicki Minaj, although Jackson remained as a mentor, replacing Jimmy Iovine.

On May 21, Caleb Johnson was announced the winner, with Jena Irene as the runner-up. Other notable contestants from this season included Remi Wolf and Queen Naija.

== Changes from previous seasons ==
There were a number of major changes this season. On May 9, 2013, Randy Jackson announced that he would no longer serve as a judge. On May 30, 2013, Mariah Carey and Nicki Minaj both also announced they would not return to the judging panel. On August 1, 2013, it was confirmed that Keith Urban would return as a judge for another season. Executive producers Nigel Lythgoe and Ken Warwick were succeeded by Per Blankens, previously of Idol, the Swedish version of American Idol. On June 25, 2013, it was confirmed that producers Jesse Ignjatovic and Evan Prager would join Blankens as executive producers of the show. Bill DeRonde replaced Warwick as the director of the audition episodes and Louis J. Horvitz also replaced Gregg Gelfand as a director of the live show. Fox television executive Mike Darnell, who helped launch American Idol in 2002, left as programming head of Fox, and Fox Sports executive David Hill was hired to oversee the series. Rickey Minor returned to the show as musical director after having left at the end of the ninth season.

In August 2013, it was reported that Jennifer Lopez would be returning as an American Idol judge. On August 22, 2013, it was reported that Jimmy Iovine would not return as the in-house mentor this season, and that he would be replaced by Randy Jackson. On August 25, 2013, Variety had reported that record producer Dr. Luke was closing a deal to sign to the judging panel, with musician will.i.am and talent manager Scooter Braun also in discussion if Luke’s deal fell through. On August 30, 2013, The Hollywood Reporter wrote that Harry Connick Jr. had signed a deal to join the judges panel and that Simon Fuller had held a party the night before with all three judges to toast the forthcoming announcement. On September 3, 2013, Lopez and Connick Jr. were officially announced as judges for this season. It was also later reported that alumni Adam Lambert and Chris Daughtry would assist in mentoring the contestants.

In a rules change from past seasons, semifinalists from the twelfth season who had not made it into the top 10 would be eligible to audition again, provided they met all of the other requirements. This season, the viewers were also able to vote for their favorite contestants via Google Search. American Idol teamed up with Facebook to present "on-air visualizations" showing real-time East Coast voting developments, including live "demographic voting trends and relative contestant rankings." Voting could also start as soon as the performance shows began this season, and real time vote rankings were shown while the show is still in progress. Additionally, each contestant was assigned the same telephone number for the entire competition.

== Regional auditions ==
Auditions took place in the following cities:

American Idol (season 13) – regional auditions
City	Preliminary date	Preliminary venue	Filming date(s)	Filming venue	Golden tickets
Salt Lake City, Utah	July 11, 2013	EnergySolutions Arena	October 2–3, 2013	Marriott Hotel at City Creek	30
San Francisco, California	July 16, 2013	AT&T Park	October 21–22, 2013	Westin St. Francis	19
Detroit, Michigan	July 21, 2013	Ford Field	October 8–9, 2013	Book-Cadillac Hotel	40
Atlanta, Georgia	July 26, 2013	Gwinnett Center	October 29–30, 2013	W Atlanta Midtown	44
Boston, Massachusetts	August 2, 2013	Gillette Stadium	September 3–4, 2013	Boston Marriott Copley Place	25
Austin, Texas	August 7, 2013	Frank Erwin Center	September 25–26, 2013	Austin Convention Center	35
Omaha, Nebraska	August 11, 2013	CenturyLink Center	October 13–14, 2013	CenturyLink Center Omaha	21
Total number of tickets to Hollywood					212

In addition, special audition bus tours were held in Little Rock, Arkansas; Oxford, Mississippi; Tuscaloosa, Alabama; Knoxville, Tennessee; and Winston-Salem, North Carolina. Those chosen proceeded on to Salt Lake City to audition in front of the judges.

One audition this season was Tristen Langley, son of first season's third-placed finalist Nikki McKibbin, who made history as the first of the second-generation contestants on American Idol.

== Hollywood week ==
A new "Hollywood or Home" round was introduced this season where contestants could be eliminated soon after they had landed at LAX airport. 52 contestants performed solo in an airplane hangar, and of those, 32 were immediately sent back home. The 160 contestants left then proceeded to Hollywood and performed solo at the Dolby Theatre in groups of ten. After this round, 104 contestants remained and they performed in groups of three or four. 77 contestants went through to a solo round.

The Hollywood rounds ended with a top 30 being announced on February 12 and 13, 2014. However, a new twist was added where the judges only choose 15 female contestants and 14 male contestants, with the 15th man to be chosen by the public. The options were either Ben Briley or Neco Starr. The result was revealed at the end of the females' semifinals episode, and Briley was the selection.

== Semifinals ==
The semifinals began on February 18. The three-day event was marketed as "Rush Week". In another twist, the judges were required to announce which ten out of the fifteen per each gender would be eligible to sing for votes, thereby eliminating five men and five women without permitting them to perform. Then, the top five men and the top five women, along with three assorted Wild Card contestants selected by the judges, advanced to the finals.

Color key:

This contestant was chosen by the public and moved on to the live shows.
This contestant was not chosen by the public and was left to perform again for the judges in the Wild Card round.
This contestant was eliminated.

Contestants are listed in the order they performed.

Female contestants (February 18)
Contestant	Song	Result
Majesty Rose	"Happy"	Advanced
Kristen O'Connor	"Turning Tables"	Wild Card
Briana Oakley	"Warrior"	Eliminated
Jena Irene	"Paint It Black"	Wild Card
Bria Anai	"Wrong Side of a Love Song"	Wild Card
Marrialle Sellars	"Roar"	Eliminated
Jessica Meuse	"Drink a Beer"	Advanced
Emily Piriz	"Paris (Ooh La La)"	Advanced
MK Nobilette	"All of Me"	Advanced
Malaya Watson	"Hard Times (No One Knows Better Than I)"	Advanced

Male contestants (February 19)
Contestant	Song	Result
Caleb Johnson	"Stay with Me"	Advanced
C. J. Harris	"Shelter"	Wild Card
Emmanuel Zidor	"Best of My Love"	Eliminated
Sam Woolf	"Babylon"	Advanced
George Lovett	"Grenade"	Eliminated
Dexter Roberts	"This Ole Boy"	Advanced
Alex Preston	"Volcano"	Advanced
Malcolm Allen	"Comin' from Where I'm From"	Eliminated
Ben Briley	"Soulshine"	Advanced
Spencer Lloyd	"Love Don't Die"	Wild Card

Eliminated without performing
Females	Andrina Brogden	Kenzie Hall	Jillian Jensen	Brandy Neelly	Austin Wolfe
Males	Jordan Brisbane	Ethan Harris	Briston Maroney	Casey Thrasher	Maurice Townsend

=== Wild Card round ===
Following the ten finalists who advanced to the finals on Thursday, February 20, five of the remaining ten semifinalists were selected by the judges to compete in the Wild Card round, which began immediately afterward. Following another performance by each Wild Card contestant, the judges then selected three contestants to join the final group of 13.

Contestants are listed in the order they performed.

Contestant	Song	Result
C. J. Harris	"Bring It On Home to Me"	Advanced
Jena Irene	"Unbreakable Me"	Advanced
Spencer Lloyd	"Ordinary Girl"	Eliminated
Bria Anai	"It's a Man's Man's Man's World"	Eliminated
Kristen O'Connor	"Unconditionally"	Advanced

== Top 13 contestants ==
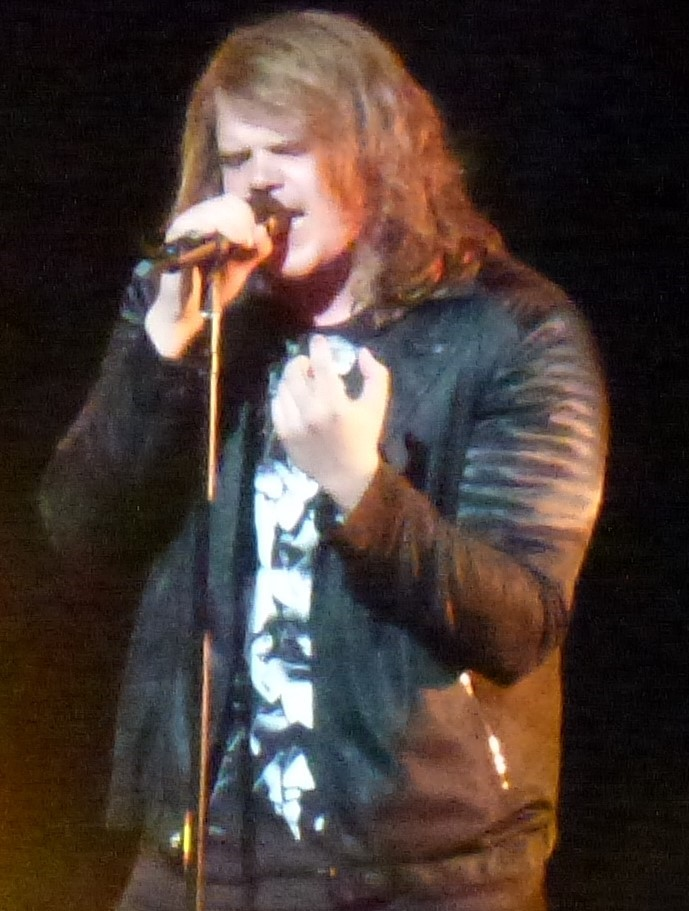
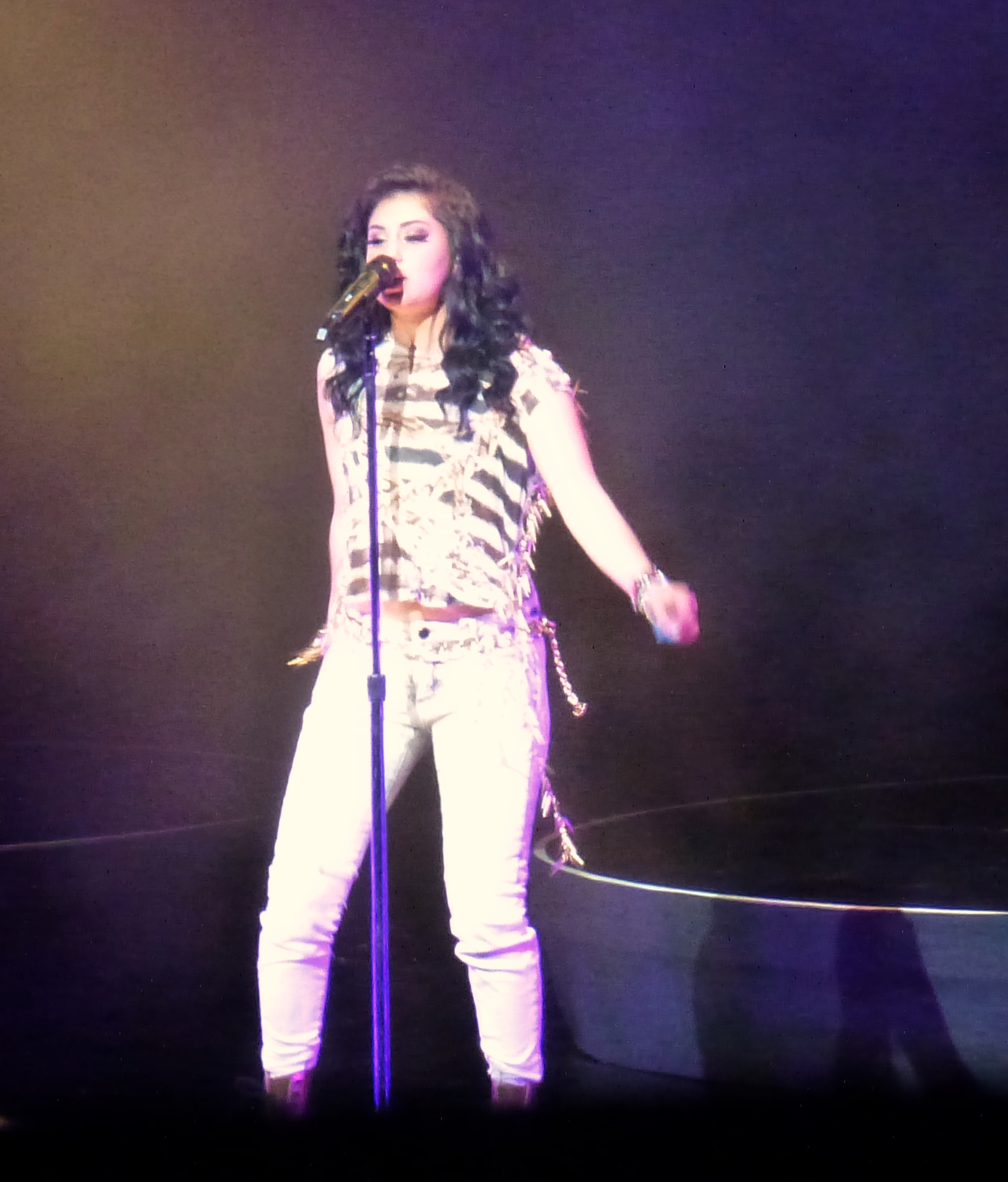
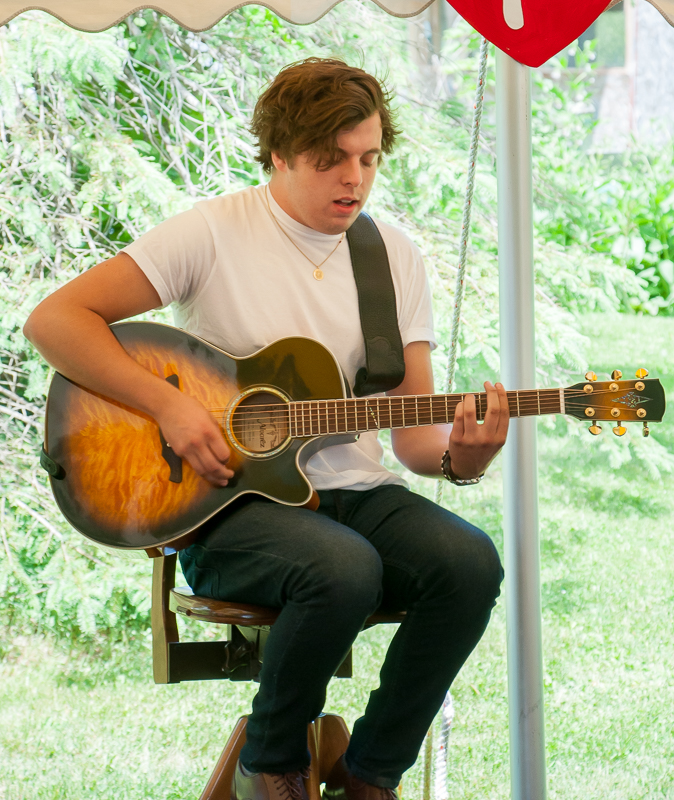
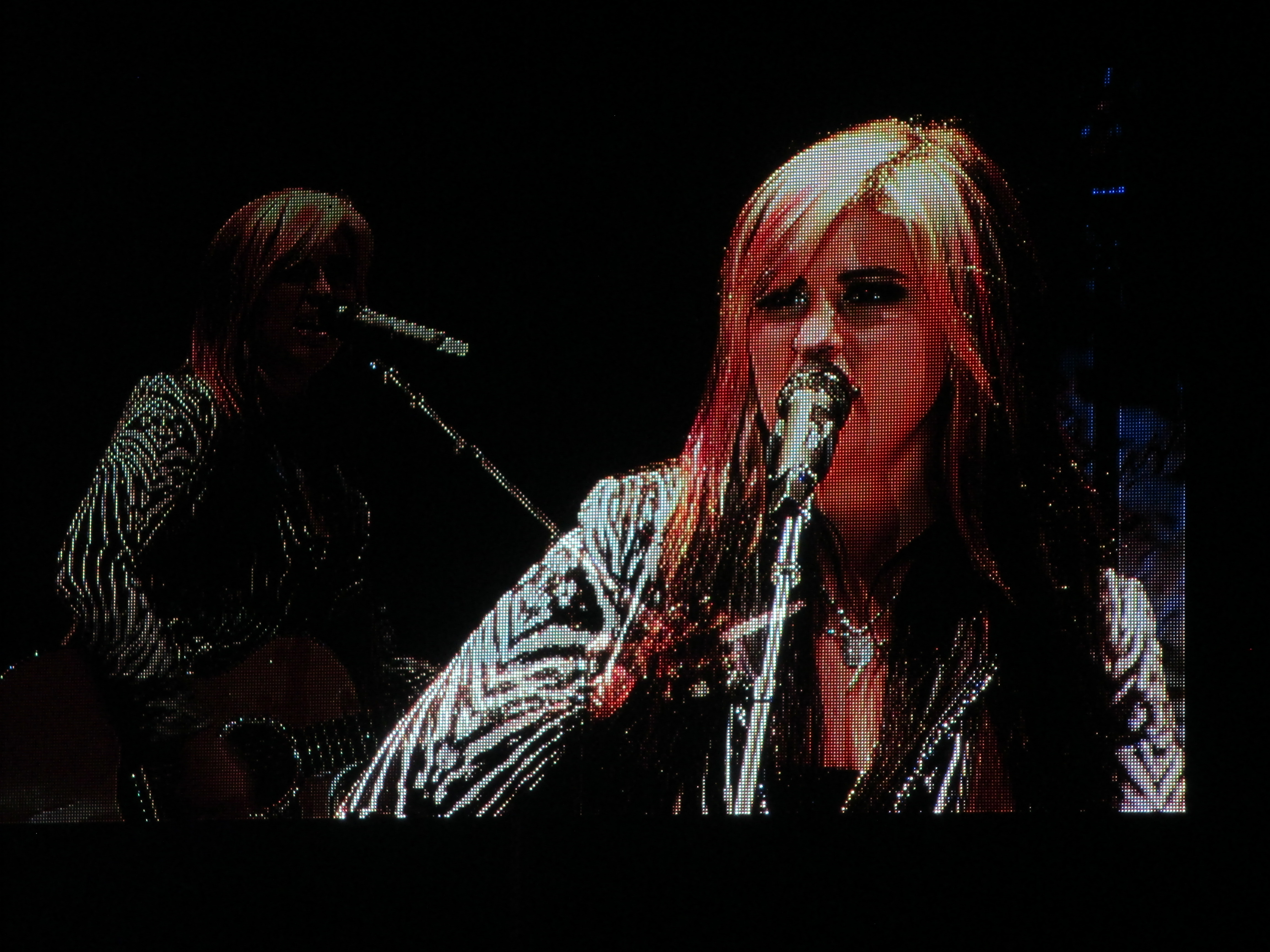
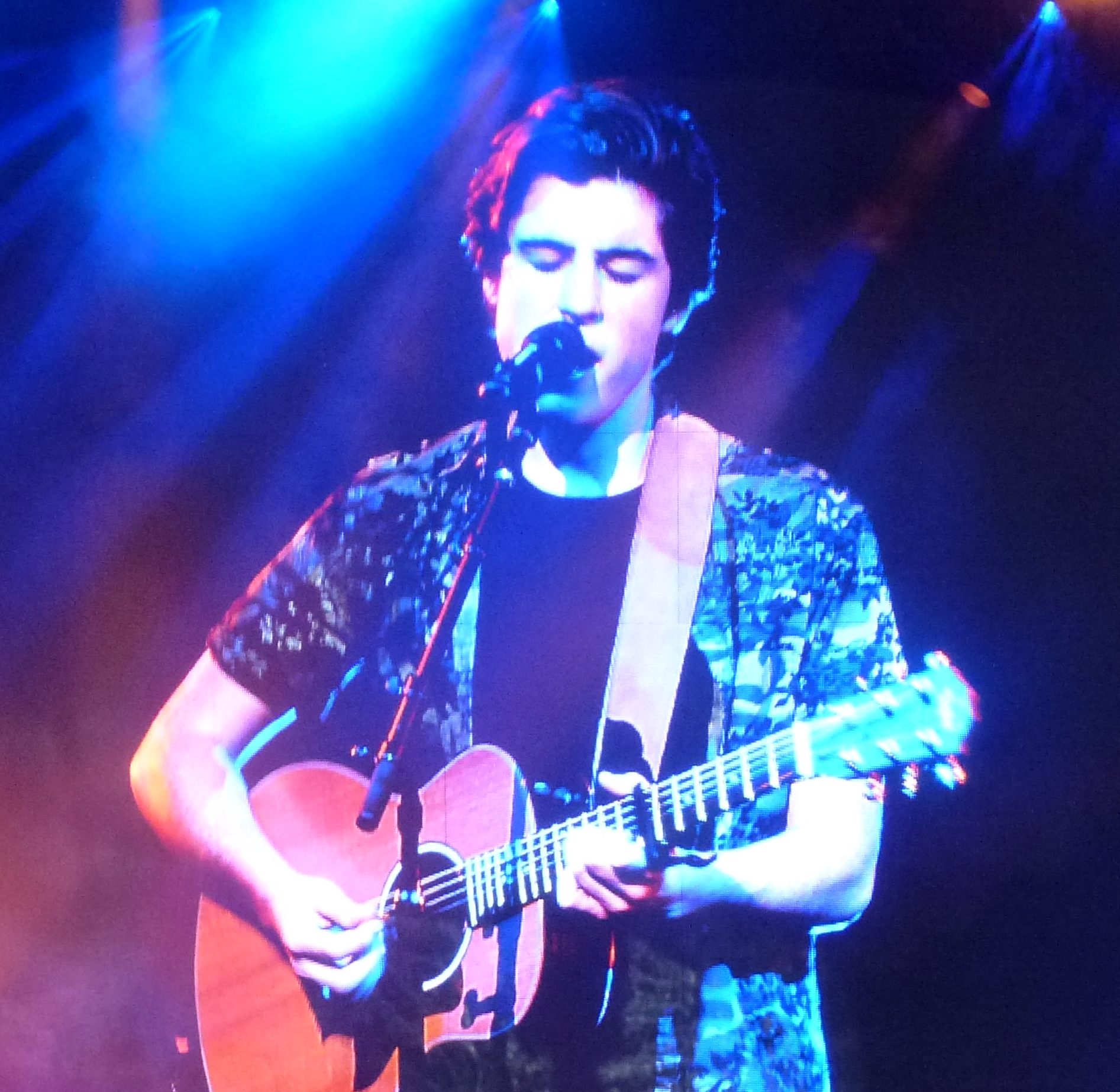
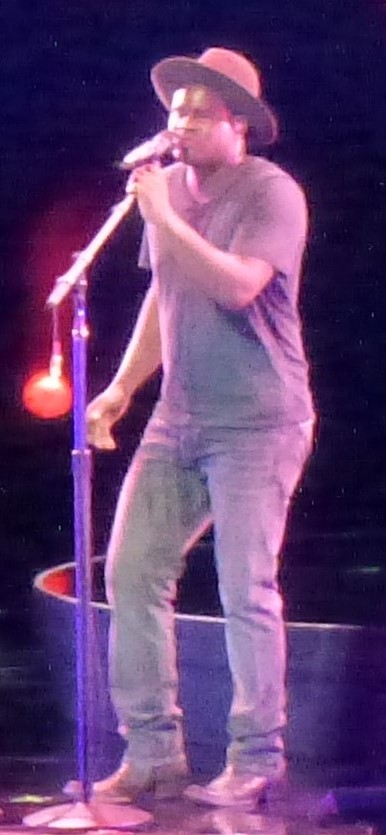
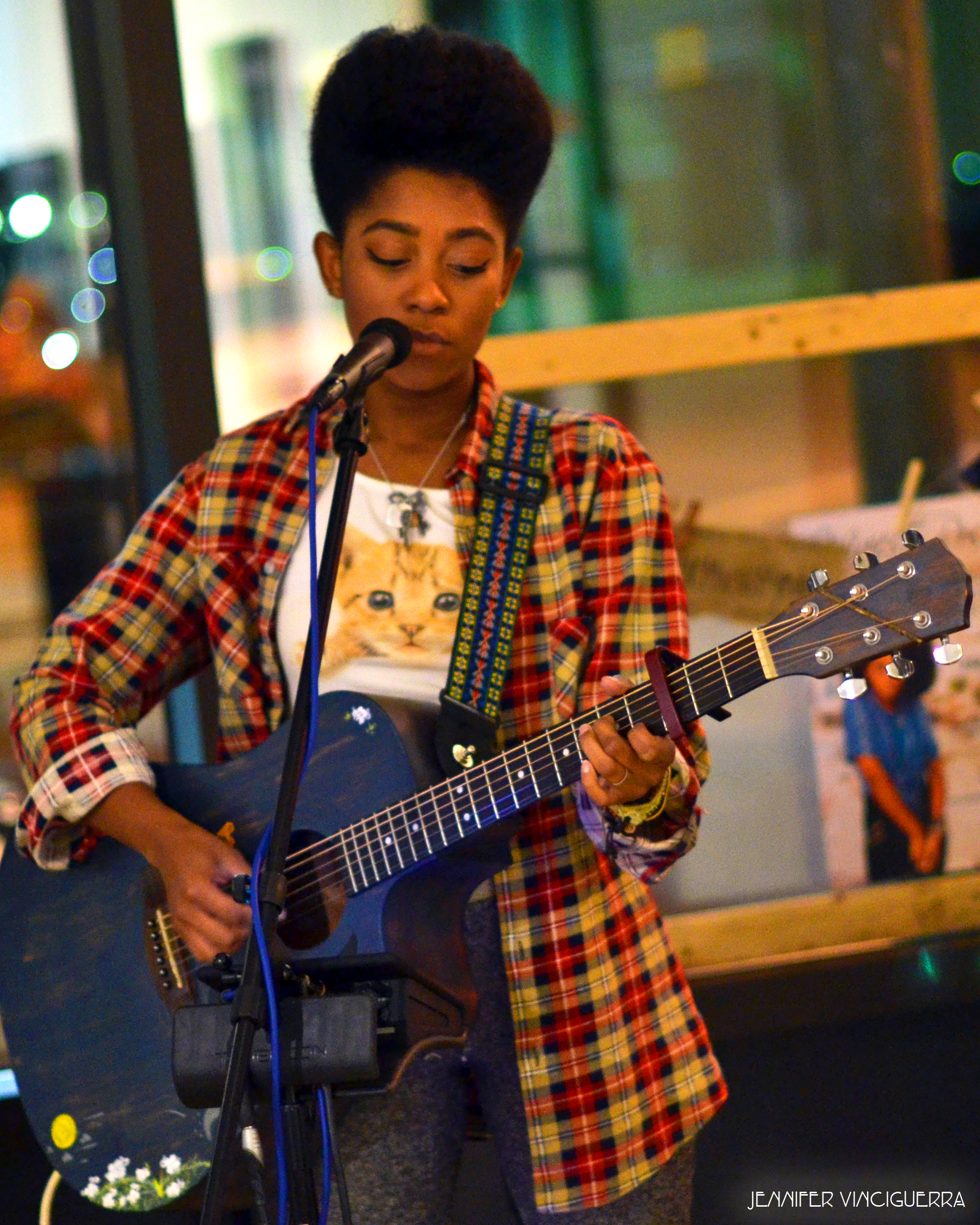
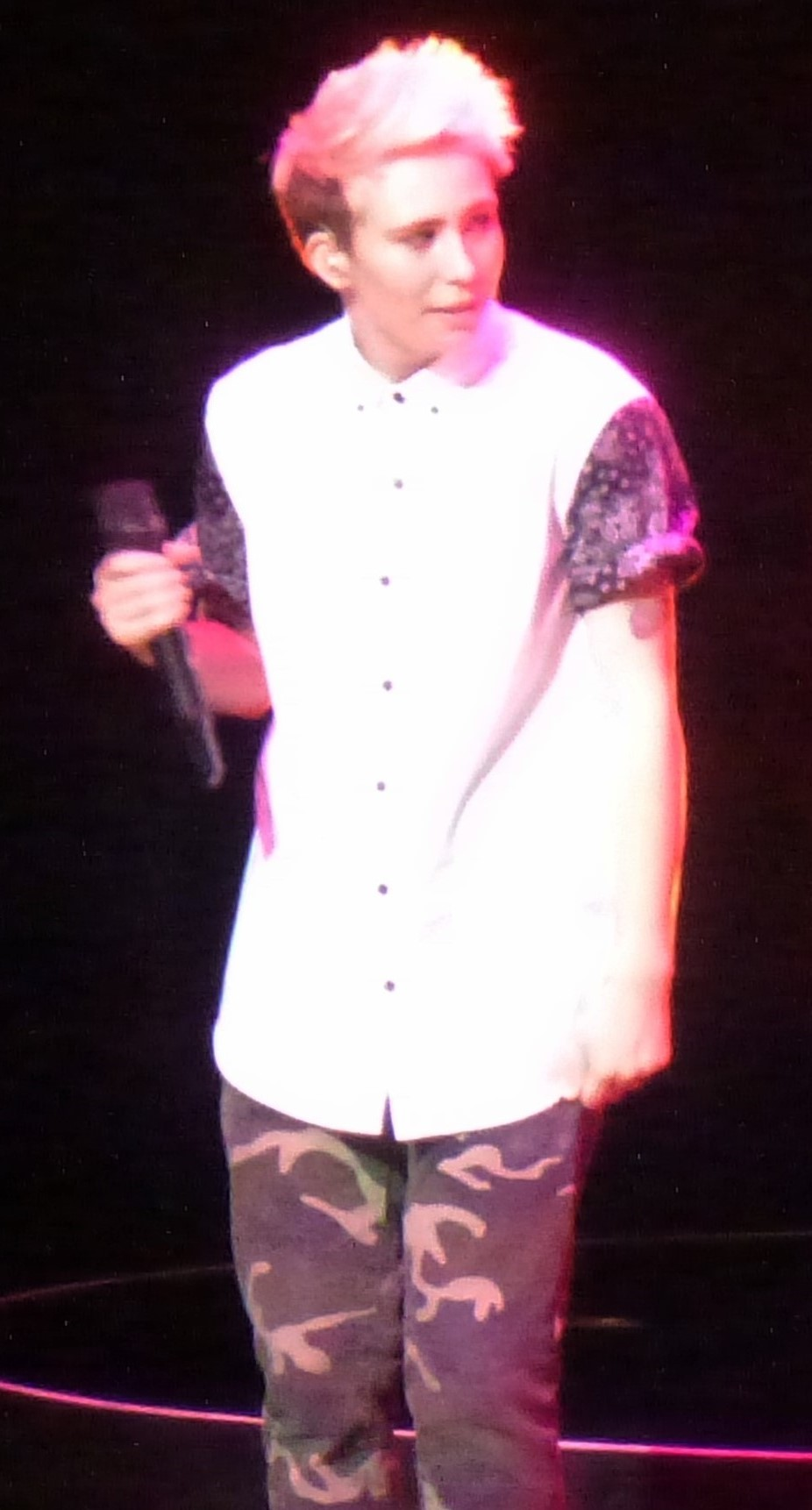
From left to right: Caleb Johnson, Jena Irene, Alex Preston, Jessica Meuse, Sam Woolf, C.J. Harris, Majesty Rose, and MK Nobilette
- Caleb Johnson (born April 23, 1991) was from Asheville, North Carolina. He had previously auditioned in the tenth and eleventh seasons, but he was cut during the selection of the top 25. He auditioned in Atlanta, where he performed an original song, "Into the Void." In Hollywood, he first performed "Sympathy for the Devil," followed by "Too Close" in a group that included C. J. Harris, and he performed "Radioactive" as his last solo.
- Jena Irene (born July 13, 1996) was from Farmington Hills, Michigan. She auditioned in Detroit with Adele's "Rolling in the Deep." She performed "Video Games" in Hollywood as her first solo, Alex Clare's "Too Close" in the group performance, and her own composition, "Unbreakable Me," in the Wild Card round.
- Alex Preston (born May 6, 1993) was from Mont Vernon, New Hampshire. He performed an original song, "Fairytales," for his audition. In Hollywood, he performed "Scream & Shout" as his first solo and "Fairytales" as his final solo.
- Jessica Meuse (born October 19, 1990, in Round Rock, Texas) was from Slapout, Alabama. She auditioned in Atlanta with one of her own songs, "Blue-Eyed Lie." She performed another original, "Done," in Hollywood.
- Sam Woolf (born April 19, 1996) was from Bradenton, Florida. He auditioned in Boston with "Lego House" by Ed Sheeran. He sang "Waiting on the World to Change" and his original composition, "I Tried," in Hollywood.
- C. J. Harris (born January 28, 1991) was from Jasper, Alabama. He auditioned in Salt Lake City, where he sang "Soulshine." He performed "Trouble" in Hollywood, and was in a group with fellow finalist Caleb Johnson, where they performed Alex Clare's "Too Close." For his final solo, he performed "Bring It On Home to Me."
- Dexter Roberts (born July 12, 1991) was from Fayette, Alabama. He performed "Drive" for his audition. He performed "I Want It That Way" as part of a group with fellow finalist Ben Briley, For his final solo, he performed an original song: "Farmer's Grandson."
- Malaya Watson (born September 24, 1997) was from Southfield, Michigan. She auditioned in Detroit with Aretha Franklin's "Ain't No Way." In Hollywood, she sang "Brand New Me" by Alicia Keys, and then performed "I Believe" as her final solo.
- Majesty Rose (born February 29, 1992) was from Goldsboro, North Carolina. She auditioned in Atlanta, where she sang Coldplay's "Violet Hill". In Hollywood, she performed "1234" and "Stars."
- MK Nobilette (born August 20, 1993) was from San Francisco, California, where she auditioned with "If I Were Your Woman." In Hollywood, she performed "Royals" in a group performance and "The A Team" by Ed Sheeran as her final solo.
- Ben Briley (born March 19, 1989) was from Gallatin, Tennessee. He auditioned in Atlanta, singing "Arms of a Woman." In Hollywood, he performed "I Want It That Way" in a group with fellow finalist Dexter Roberts, and "Stars" as his final solo.
- Emily Piriz (born January 28, 1996) was from Orlando, Florida. She auditioned in Atlanta, singing "Mamma Knows Best" by Jessie J. She sang "Nothing but the Water" as her first solo in Hollywood and "Stars" as her final solo.
- Kristen O'Connor (born April 19, 1989) was from Sebastian, Florida. She auditioned in Atlanta, singing "Good Morning Heartache". In Hollywood, she performed "Unconditionally" as a solo and "Treasure" in a group performance with fellow finalist, Sam Woolf.

== Finals ==
There were thirteen weeks of finals with thirteen contestants competing. At least one contestant was eliminated every week based on the public's votes, although the judges could veto one elimination through the use of the "judges' save."

Color key:

This contestant was saved by America's vote.
This contestant was in the bottom two or three, but was saved by America's vote.
This contestant was saved from elimination by the judges.
This contestant was eliminated.
This contestant won American Idol.
This contestant was the runner-up.

=== Top 13 – This Is Me ===
Contestants are listed in the order they performed.

Contestant	Song	Result
Dexter Roberts	"Aw Naw"	Safe
Malaya Watson	"Runaway Baby"	Bottom three
Kristen O'Connor	"Beautiful Disaster"	Eliminated
Ben Briley	"Folsom Prison Blues"	Safe
C.J. Harris	"Radio"	Safe
MK Nobilette	"Satisfaction"	Bottom three
Majesty Rose	"Tightrope"	Safe
Jena Irene	"The Scientist"	Safe
Alex Preston	"A Beautiful Mess"	Safe
Jessica Meuse	"The Crow & the Butterfly"	Safe
Emily Piriz	"Glitter in the Air"	Safe
Sam Woolf	"Unwell"	Safe
Caleb Johnson	"Pressure & Time"	Safe

Non-competition performance
Performers	Song
Top 13	"Counting Stars" "Radioactive"
Candice Glover	"Cried" "Same Kinda Man"
Jake Bugg	"Me and You"

=== Top 12 – Home ===
Contestants are listed in the order they performed.

Contestant	Song	Result
Jena Irene	"Suddenly I See"	Bottom three
Alex Preston	"I Don't Want to Be"	Safe
Jessica Meuse	"White Flag"	Safe
Dexter Roberts	"Lucky Man"	Safe
Emily Piriz	"Let's Get Loud"	Eliminated
Caleb Johnson	"Working Man"	Safe
MK Nobilette	"Drops of Jupiter (Tell Me)"	Bottom three
C.J. Harris	"Waiting on the World to Change"	Safe
Sam Woolf	"Just One"	Safe
Malaya Watson	"Take Me to the King"	Safe
Ben Briley	"Turning Home"	Safe
Majesty Rose	"Fix You"	Safe

Non-competition performance
Performers	Song
Phillip Phillips	"Raging Fire"
Kodaline	"All I Want"

=== Top 11 – Movie soundtracks ===
Contestants chose songs featured in movies, and are listed in the order they performed.

Contestant	Song	Film	Result
Sam Woolf	"Come Together"	Across the Universe	Bottom three
Jessica Meuse	"The Sound of Silence"	The Graduate	Safe
C.J. Harris	"Can't You See"	Blow	Safe
Dexter Roberts	"Sweet Home Alabama"	Forrest Gump	Safe
Ben Briley	"Bennie and the Jets"	27 Dresses	Eliminated
Majesty Rose	"Let It Go"	Frozen	Bottom three
Caleb Johnson	"Skyfall"	Skyfall	Safe
MK Nobilette	"Make You Feel My Love"	Hope Floats	Safe
Alex Preston	"Falling Slowly"	Once	Safe
Jena Irene	"Decode"	Twilight	Safe
Malaya Watson	"I Am Changing"	Dreamgirls	Safe

Non-competition performance
Performers	Song
Harry Connick, Jr.	"One Fine Thing" "Come by Me"
Mali Music	"Beautiful"

=== Top 10 – Billboard top 10 ===
Contestants each performed one song from the Billboard top 10 lists from 2011 to 2014. Contestants are listed in the order they performed.

Contestant	Song	Result
MK Nobilette	"Perfect"	Eliminated
Dexter Roberts	"Cruise"	Bottom three
Jena Irene	"Clarity"	Safe
Alex Preston	"Story of My Life"	Safe
Malaya Watson	"When I Was Your Man"	Safe
Caleb Johnson	"The Edge of Glory"	Safe
C.J. Harris	"Invisible"	Safe
Jessica Meuse	"Pumped Up Kicks"	Safe
Majesty Rose	"Wake Me Up"	Bottom three
Sam Woolf	"We Are Young"	Safe

Non-competition performance
Performers	Song
Jennifer Lopez with Allison Iraheta, French Montana, Jessica Sanchez & Pia Toscano	"I Luh Ya Papi"
Royal Teeth	"Wild"

=== Top 9 – "I'm with the band!" ===
Each contestant performed as the lead singer of the show's band, performing one song each of their choice.

Contestant	Song	Result
Alex Preston	"Don't Speak"	Safe
Majesty Rose	"Shake It Out"	Eliminated
Dexter Roberts	"Boondocks"	Safe
Malaya Watson	"The Long and Winding Road"	Safe
Sam Woolf	"Hey There Delilah"	Bottom three
Jessica Meuse	"Rhiannon"	Safe
C.J. Harris	"If It Hadn't Been for Love"	Bottom three
Caleb Johnson	"Dazed and Confused"	Safe
Jena Irene	"Bring Me to Life"	Safe

Non-competition performance
Performers	Song
Top 9	"Clocks" "(I Can't Get No) Satisfaction" "My Songs Know What You Did in the Dark (Light Em Up)"
Janelle Monáe	"What is Love?"

=== Top 8 (April 3) – Back to the start ===
Contestants performed two songs each: one solo, which was the song that they had originally performed when they first auditioned, and one duet with a fellow contestant. Contestants are listed in the order they performed. The judges chose to use their "judges' save" when Sam Woolf was announced as the performer to be eliminated. As a result, no one was eliminated this week.

Contestant	Order	Audition song	Result
Jessica Meuse	1	"Blue-Eyed Lie"	Safe
C.J. Harris	2	"Soulshine"	Bottom three
Sam Woolf	4	"Lego House"	Saved by the judges
Malaya Watson	6	"Ain't No Way"	Bottom three
Dexter Roberts	7	"One Mississippi"	Safe
Jena Irene	9	"Rolling in the Deep"	Safe
Caleb Johnson	11	"Chain of Fools"	Safe
Alex Preston	12	"Fairytales"	Safe
Jena Irene & Alex Preston	3	"Just Give Me a Reason"	
Caleb Johnson & Jessica Meuse	5	"Stop Draggin' My Heart Around"	
Malaya Watson & Sam Woolf	8	"Lucky"	
C.J. Harris & Dexter Roberts	10	"Alright"	

Non-competition performance
Performers	Song
Daughtry	"Waiting for Superman"

=== Top 8 (April 10) – Music from the 1980s ===
David Cook served as a guest mentor this week. Contestants performed two songs each: one solo and one duet with a fellow contestant. Contestants are listed in the order they performed.

Contestant	Order	Song	Result
Jena Irene	1	"I Love Rock 'n' Roll"	Safe
Dexter Roberts	2	"Keep Your Hands to Yourself"	Safe
Malaya Watson	4	"Through the Fire"	Eliminated
Jessica Meuse	6	"Call Me"	Safe
Sam Woolf	7	"Time After Time"	Safe
Alex Preston	9	"Every Breath You Take"	Safe
C.J. Harris	11	"Free Fallin'"	Bottom two
Caleb Johnson	12	"Faithfully"	Safe
Alex Preston & Sam Woolf	3	"The Girl Is Mine"	
Jena Irene & Caleb Johnson	5	"It's Only Love"	
C.J. Harris & Malaya Watson	8	"I Knew You Were Waiting (For Me)"	
Jessica Meuse & Dexter Roberts	10	"Islands in the Stream"	

=== Top 7 – Competitors' choice ===
Each contestant performed two songs: one song chosen by a fellow contestant and either one duet with a fellow contestant or one trio with two fellow contestants. Contestants are listed in the order they performed.

Contestant	Order	Song	Chosen by	Result
Caleb Johnson	1	"Family Tree"	Alex Preston	Safe
Jessica Meuse	2	"Gunpowder & Lead"	Sam Woolf	Bottom two
C.J. Harris	4	"Gravity"	Caleb Johnson	Safe
Dexter Roberts	5	"Muckalee Creek Water"	C.J. Harris	Eliminated
Alex Preston	7	"The A Team"	Dexter Roberts	Safe
Sam Woolf	8	"Sail Away"	Jessica Meuse	Safe
Jena Irene	10	"Creep"	Caleb Johnson	Safe
Alex Preston & Sam Woolf	3	"Let Her Go"		
Jena Irene & Caleb Johnson	6	"Gimme Shelter"		
C.J. Harris, Jessica Meuse & Dexter Roberts	9	"Compass"		

=== Top 6 – Rock and roll & country ===
Each contestant performed two songs: one rock and roll and one country. Contestants are listed in the order they performed.

Contestant	Order	Song	Result
Jena Irene	1	"Barracuda"	Safe
Jena Irene	10	"So Small"	Safe
Sam Woolf	2	"It's Time"	Safe
Sam Woolf	7	"You're Still the One"	Safe
C.J. Harris	3	"American Woman"	Eliminated
C.J. Harris	11	"Whatever It Is"	Eliminated
Alex Preston	4	"Animal"	Safe
Alex Preston	9	"Always on My Mind"	Safe
Caleb Johnson	5	"Sting Me"	Safe
Caleb Johnson	8	"Undo It"	Safe
Jessica Meuse	6	"Somebody to Love"	Bottom two
Jessica Meuse	12	"Jolene"	Bottom two

=== Top 5 – America's choice ===
Jason Mraz served as a guest mentor this week. Each contestant performed three songs chosen by viewers through a public vote, one of which was either a duet with a fellow contestant or a trio with two fellow contestants. Contestants are listed in the order they performed.

During the results show, the contestants were given the option to decide whether this week would be a non-elimination week (the following week would then feature a double-elimination), but it would have required a unanimous agreement. Since Jena Irene and Alex Preston declined the option, the elimination went forth as planned.

Contestant	Order	Song	Result
Alex Preston	1	"Sweater Weather"	Safe
Alex Preston	8	"Say Something"	Safe
Caleb Johnson	2	"I Don't Want to Miss a Thing"	Safe
Caleb Johnson	12	"Still of the Night"	Safe
Jessica Meuse	4	"Human"	Safe
Jessica Meuse	11	"Summertime Sadness"	Safe
Sam Woolf	5	"Sing"	Eliminated
Sam Woolf	10	"How to Save a Life"	Eliminated
Jena Irene	6	"My Body"	Safe
Jena Irene	9	"Valerie"	Safe
Jena Irene, Alex Preston & Sam Woolf	3	"Best Day of My Life"	
Caleb Johnson & Jessica Meuse	7	"Beast of Burden"	

Non-competition performance
Performers	Song
Keith Urban	"Good Thing"

=== Top 4 – Love songs: break-ups, dedications, and make-ups ===
Each contestant performed three love songs: the first dealing with break-ups, the second dealing with personal dedications, and the third dealing with make-ups. Contestants are listed in the order they performed.

Contestant	Order	Song	Result
Caleb Johnson	1	"You Give Love a Bad Name"	Safe
Caleb Johnson	5	"Travelin' Band"	Safe
Caleb Johnson	9	"Maybe I'm Amazed"	Safe
Jessica Meuse	2	"Since U Been Gone"	Eliminated
Jessica Meuse	6	"So What"	Eliminated
Jessica Meuse	10	"You and I"	Eliminated
Alex Preston	3	"Too Close"	Safe
Alex Preston	8	"I'm Yours"	Safe
Alex Preston	12	"Yellow"	Safe
Jena Irene	4	"Heartbreaker"	Safe
Jena Irene	7	"Bad Romance"	Safe
Jena Irene	11	"Can't Help Falling in Love"	Safe

=== Top 3 ===
Each contestant performed three songs: one chosen by mentor Randy Jackson, one chosen by the judges, and one chosen by the finalists' hometown. Contestants are listed in the order they performed.

This was also American Idol's 500th episode.

Contestant	Order	Song	Result
Caleb Johnson	1	"Never Tear Us Apart" (Note: Song chosen by Randy Jackson)	Safe
Caleb Johnson	4	"Demons"	Safe
Caleb Johnson	7	"Dazed and Confused"	Safe
Alex Preston	2	"Pompeii"	Eliminated
Alex Preston	5	"Stay"	Eliminated
Alex Preston	8	"Story of My Life"	Eliminated
Jena Irene	3	"Titanium"	Safe
Jena Irene	6	"Heart Attack"	Safe
Jena Irene	9	"Creep"	Safe

Non-competition performance
Performers	Song
The Chainsmokers	"#Selfie"
Scotty McCreery	"Feelin' It"

=== Top 2 – Finale ===
Each contestant performed three songs, one of which was chosen by producer Simon Fuller, and are listed in the order they performed.

Contestant	Order	Song	Result
Jena Irene	1	"Dog Days Are Over" (Note: Song chosen by Simon Fuller.)	Runner-up
Jena Irene	3	"Can't Help Falling in Love"	Runner-up
Jena Irene	5	"We Are One"	Runner-up
Caleb Johnson	2	"Dream On"	Winner
Caleb Johnson	4	"Maybe I'm Amazed"	Winner
Caleb Johnson	6	"As Long as You Love Me"	Winner

Non-competition performance
Performers	Song
Top 13 (Note: MK Nobilette was not a part of this group performance.)	"Breakaway"
Jena Irene & Caleb Johnson	"We Will Rock You" "Just a Girl" "It's Only Love"
Sam Woolf with Phillip Phillips	"Home" "Raging Fire"
Jessica Meuse with Jennifer Nettles	"That Girl" "Wrecking Ball"
Jennifer Lopez	"First Love"
Caleb Johnson with Kiss	"Love Gun" "Shout It Out Loud"
Ben Briley, Dexter Roberts, C.J. Harris, Sam Woolf, Alex Preston & Caleb Johnson with Aloe Blacc	"The Man"
Kristen O'Connor, Emily Piriz, Majesty Rose, Malaya Watson, Jessica Meuse & Jena Irene with Demi Lovato	"Really Don't Care" "Neon Lights"
Jena Irene	"Decode"
Jena Irene with Paramore	"Ain't It Fun"
John Legend	"You & I (Nobody in the World)"
Malaya Watson with John Legend	"All of Me"
Alex Preston with Jason Mraz	"Love Someone"
Richard Marx & Ryan Seacrest	"Right Here Waiting"
Darius Rucker	"True Believers"
C.J. Harris & Dexter Roberts with Darius Rucker	"Alright"
Jena Irene & Caleb Johnson	"Need You Now"
Lady Antebellum	"Bartender"
Harry Connick, Jr., Randy Jackson, Jennifer Lopez & Keith Urban	"True Colors" "Go Your Own Way"
Caleb Johnson	"As Long as You Love Me"

== Elimination chart ==
Color key:

Winner
Runner-up
Did not perform
Saved by the public
Saved by the judges
Bottom two or three
Eliminated

American Idol (season 13) - Eliminations
Contestant	Pl.	Semifinals		Top 13	Top 12	Top 11	Top 10	Top 9	Top 8 (Note: Because the judges used their one "judges' save" to save Sam Woolf, the top 8 remained intact for another week.)		Top 7	Top 6	Top 5 (Note: In a twist, the contestants were given the option to (by unanimous agreement) decide whether there would be a non-elimination week (with the following week being a double-elimination), Since Jena Irene and Alex Preston declined, the Top 5 eliminations continued as planned.)	Top 4	Top 3	Finale
Contestant	Pl.	2/20		2/27	3/6	3/13	3/20	3/27	4/3	4/10	4/17	4/24	5/1	5/8	5/15	5/21
Caleb Johnson	1	Safe	N/A	Safe	Safe	Safe	Safe	Safe	Safe	Safe	Safe	Safe	Safe	Safe	Safe	Winner
Jena Irene	2	Wild Card	Saved	Safe	Bottom three	Safe	Safe	Safe	Safe	Safe	Safe	Safe	Safe	Safe	Safe	Runner-up
Alex Preston	3	Safe	N/A	Safe	Safe	Safe	Safe	Safe	Safe	Safe	Safe	Safe	Safe	Safe	Eliminated	
Jessica Meuse	4	Safe	N/A	Safe	Safe	Safe	Safe	Safe	Safe	Safe	Bottom two	Bottom two	Safe	Eliminated		
Sam Woolf	5	Safe	N/A	Safe	Safe	Bottom three	Safe	Bottom three	Saved	Safe	Safe	Safe	Eliminated			
C.J. Harris	6	Wild Card	Saved	Safe	Safe	Safe	Safe	Bottom three	Bottom three	Bottom two	Safe	Eliminated				
Dexter Roberts	7	Safe	N/A	Safe	Safe	Safe	Bottom three	Safe	Safe	Safe	Eliminated					
Malaya Watson	8	Safe	N/A	Bottom three	Safe	Safe	Safe	Safe	Bottom three	Eliminated						
Majesty Rose	9	Safe	N/A	Safe	Safe	Bottom three	Bottom three	Eliminated								
MK Nobilette	10	Safe	N/A	Bottom three	Bottom three	Safe	Eliminated									
Ben Briley	11	Safe	N/A	Safe	Safe	Eliminated										
Emily Piriz	12	Safe	N/A	Safe	Eliminated											
Kristen O'Connor	13	Wild Card	Saved	Eliminated												
Bria Anai		Wild Card	Eliminated													
Spencer Lloyd		Wild Card	Eliminated													
Malcolm Allen		Eliminated														
George Lovett		Eliminated														
Briana Oakley		Eliminated														
Marrialle Sellars		Eliminated														
Emmanuel Zidor		Eliminated														

== Controversy ==
=== Caleb Johnson comment ===
During his interview with AfterBuzz TV following the top 5 elimination show, Caleb Johnson made offensive remarks about his fans who tweet him song suggestions. "[Twitter] gives access to a bunch of retards to talk to me," Caleb said. "I don't really enjoy having to see somebody telling me what song I have to sing. I think at this point of the competition, I can pick and choose my own songs and represent me. I don't need 10,000 people saying, 'You should sing this, you should sing that. Listen to me!' Fortunately, guys, I'm going to listen to myself, whether you like it or not."

His comment was described as "arrogant," with some fans becoming angry. Caleb issued an apology on his Facebook page. "For the record that juvenile comment I made in the interview was not directed towards my fans but to the wackos that send hundreds of hate messages a day to me! You guys are amazing and I cannot thank you enough for your support. Sorry if it offended anybody it was the wrong choice of words. Also I greatly appreciate it when you guys give me song suggestions but it gets really overwhelming at the volume it comes in so please understand! Rock on!"

== Reception ==
=== U.S. Nielsen ratings ===
Live + same day ratings

For the first time in nearly twelve years, an American Idol episode dropped beneath the ten-million viewer mark. This occurred on February 18, 2014. The last time an episode was below this mark was July 24, 2002.

Episode list

No.	Episode	Air date	Ratings/Share households	Rating/Share 18–49	Viewers (millions)	Weekly rank	Ref.
1	"It's a New Dawn, It's a New Day!"	January 15	8.7 / 14	4.7 / 13	15.19	5	
2	"The Auditions Head West"	January 16	7.5 / 12	3.9 / 12	13.35	6	
3	"Do It For Detroit!"	January 22	7.8 / 12	4.0 / 11	13.29	4	
4	"Just Peachy!"	January 23	7.2 / 11	3.4 / 10	12.39	6	
5	"Be-UTAH-ful"	January 29	7.3 / 11	3.8 / 10	12.73	8	
6	"OMG! Omaha!"	January 30	6.6 / 10	3.2 / 9	11.42	11	
7	"Hollywood or Home: An Idol Cliff 'Hangar'"	February 5	8.0 / 12	3.9 / 11	13.43	9	
8	"Hollywood Week: Group Love"	February 6	6.5 / 10	3.1 / 9	11.08	13	
9	"Hollywood Week: Final Judgment"	February 12	6.7 / 10	3.4 / 10	11.67	9	
10	"A Hollywood Ending"	February 13	5.8 / 9	3.0 / 9	10.18	10	
11	"Rush Week: Girls' Night"	February 18	5.9 / 9	2.7 / 8	9.73	11	
12	"Rush Week: Guys' Night"	February 19	6.0 / 9	2.6 / 8	9.95	14	
13	"Rush Week: Meet Your Finalists"	February 20	5.7 / 9	2.4 / 8	9.36	15	
14	"The Top 13: This Is Me"	February 26	6.6 / 10	2.7 / 8	10.78	14	
15	"The Top 13 Results"	February 27	5.9 / 9	2.4 / 7	10.01	17	
16	"The Top 12: Home"	March 5	6.4 / 10	2.7 / 8	10.53	13	
17	"The Top 12 Results"	March 6	6.1 / 10	2.2 / 7	9.76	17	
18	"The Top 11: Songs from the Cinema"	March 12	6.2 / 10	2.4 / 7	10.27	12	
19	"The Top 11 Results"	March 13	5.4 / 9	2.2 / 6	8.86	21	
20	"The Top 10: Billboard Top 10 Charts"	March 19	6.0 / 10	2.2 / 7	9.83	13	
21	"The Top 10 Results"	March 20	5.1 / 8	2.0 / 6	8.41	22	
22	"The Top 9"	March 26	5.6 / 9	2.2 / 7	9.33	15	
23	"The Top 9 Results"	March 27	4.9 / 8	1.9 / 6	7.98	24	
24	"The Top 8"	April 2	5.6 / 9	2.1 / 6	8.89	21	
25	"The Top 8 Results"	April 3	4.9 / 8	1.7 / 5	7.72	25	
26	"Top 8 Redux"	April 9	5.4 / 9	2.0 / 7	8.90	18	
27	"Top 8 Redux Results"	April 10	4.7 / 8	1.8 / 5	7.63	23	
28	"The Top 7"	April 16	5.2 / 8	1.9 / 6	8.53	14	
29	"Top 7 Results"	April 17	4.9 / 8	1.9 / 6	7.97	15	
30	"The Top 6"	April 23	5.4 / 9	2.1 / 7	9.02	17	
31	"Top 6 Results"	April 24	4.7 / 8	1.8 / 5	7.68	24	
32	"The Top 5"	April 30	5.2 / 8	1.9 / 6	8.79	19	
33	"Top 5 Results"	May 1	4.3 / 7	1.5 / 5	7.03	>25	
34	"The Top 4"	May 7	4.9 / 8	1.8 / 6	7.97	22	
35	"Top 4 Results"	May 8	4.5 / 7	1.6 / 5	7.18	>25	
36	"The Top 3"	May 14	5.4 / 9	2.1 / 6	8.93	19	
37	"Top 3 Results"	May 15	5.2 / 8	2.0 / 6	8.67	21	
38	"The Final 2"	May 20	4.0 / 7	1.7 / 6	6.76		
39	"Finale"	May 21	6.1 / 10	2.6 / 9	10.53		

Live + 7 day (DVR) ratings

Episode list

No.	Episode	Air date	DVR 18–49	Total 18–49	DVR viewers (millions)	Total viewers (millions)	Ref.
1	"Auditions #1"	January 15	0.7	5.4	2.585	17.773	
2	"Auditions #2"	January 16	N/A	N/A	N/A	N/A	
3	"Auditions #3"	January 22	0.8	4.8	2.120	15.407	
4	"Auditions #4"	January 23	1.0	4.4	2.479	14.870	
5	"Auditions #5"	January 29	0.8	4.6	1.967	14.698	
6	"Auditions #6"	January 30	0.8	4.0	1.888	13.312	
7	"Hollywood or Home"	February 5	0.9	4.8	2.240	15.668	
8	"Hollywood Group Round"	February 6	0.9	4.0	2.268	13.346	
9	"Hollywood Round, Top 30 reveal Part #1"	February 12	0.8	4.2	1.864	13.539	
10	"Hollywood Round, Top 30 reveal Part #2"	February 13	0.8	3.8	1.874	12.058	
11	"Rush Week: Girls' Night"	February 19	N/A	N/A	N/A	N/A	
12	"Rush Week: Guys' Night"	February 20	0.7	3.3	1.763	11.715	
13	"Rush Week: Meet Your Finalists"	February 21	0.6	3.0	1.592	10.947	
14	"The Top 13: This Is Me"	February 26	N/A	N/A	N/A	N/A	
15	"The Top 13 Results"	February 27	N/A	N/A	N/A	N/A	
16	"The Top 12: Home"	March 5	N/A	N/A	N/A	N/A	
17	"The Top 12 Results"	March 6	N/A	N/A	N/A	N/A	
18	"The Top 11: Songs from the Cinema"	March 12	N/A	N/A	N/A	N/A	
19	"The Top 11 Results"	March 13	N/A	N/A	N/A	N/A	
20	"The Top 10: Billboard Top 10 Charts"	March 19	N/A	N/A	N/A	N/A	
21	"The Top 10 Results"	March 20	N/A	N/A	N/A	N/A	
22	"The Top 9"	March 26	N/A	N/A	N/A	N/A	
23	"The Top 9 Results"	March 27	N/A	N/A	N/A	N/A	

=== Critical response ===
Harry Connick Jr. was lauded for his performance as a judge. USA Today, Rolling Stone, and MTV all claimed that he "stole the spotlight" during the season premiere with his humor and knowledgeable feedback. Kristin Dos Santos of E! Online suggested that Connick Jr. could save the struggling show. She wrote that he was better than Simon Cowell, writing that while he is "brutally honest," he also shows heart. Robert Rorke of the New York Post wrote that Connick Jr. was unlikely to "save" American Idol, but also wrote that he made the show watchable again by bringing class and keeping the focus on the contestants. Keith Urban was also lauded as a judge, and his chemistry with Harry Contick Jr was considered one of the highlights of the season.

The "Rush Week" twist was not well received by critics. As described by Lyndsey Parker of Yahoo TV, "The other five just sat backstage for a couple hours (while their loved ones sat in the audience), waited in vain for their names to be called, and eventually went home." Furthermore, Amy Reiter of the Los Angeles Times stated, "Like the women, once 10 of the guys were given the chance to compete for our votes, the five remaining... were collectively shuffled before us, looking stunned and solemn, and then sent home, this time with a few tepidly encouraging parting words from the judges."

== Music releases ==
- Music releases

== Concert tour ==
- American Idols LIVE! Tour 2014
