= Sam Woolf (singer-songwriter) =

American singer (born 1996)

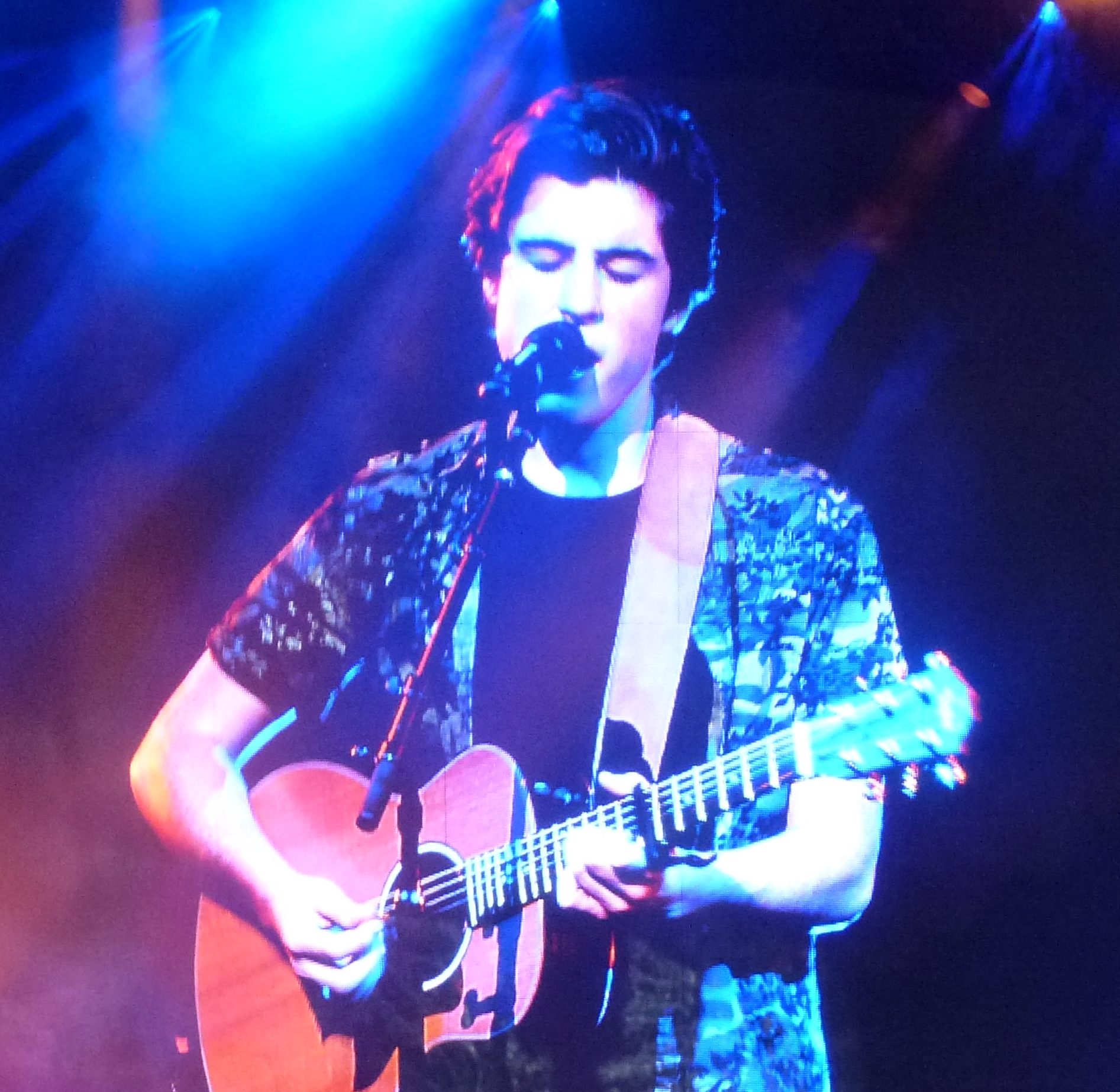

Background information
- Born: Samuel Joseph Woolf; April 19, 1996 (age 30); West Bloomfield, Michigan, United States
- Genres: Indie folk, folk-pop, folk rock, indie pop
- Occupation: Singer-songwriter
- Instruments: Vocals, guitar
- Years active: 2013–present

Samuel Joseph Woolf (born April 19, 1996) is an American singer-songwriter from West Bloomfield, Michigan who finished in fifth place on the thirteenth season of American Idol. Shortly after his participation on the series, he released the EP Pretend, which reached the top ten on Billboard's Heatseekers chart. Since then, he has released several non-album singles and collaborated on several songs with The Como Brothers.

== Early life ==
Sam Woolf was born on April 19, 1996, in West Bloomfield, Michigan to Mary and Scott Woolf. His great-grandfather, Sammy Woolf, was a well-known Detroit bandleader, his uncle is composer Randall Woolf, and pianist Kathleen Supové is his aunt (by marriage). His great-uncle, Mickey Woolf, was a musician prominent in Detroit's Jewish community. Woolf was a student at the Scotch Elementary School in West Bloomfield, but moved to North Port, Florida in 2006 when he was 9. When he was 13, his mother remarried and moved to another city in Florida, and Woolf and his older sister Emily remained in North Port with their father. Woolf and his father moved to Bradenton, Florida just prior to his second year of high school, where he attended Braden River High School. At the beginning of his junior year, he moved in with his grandparents who also live in Bradenton.

Woolf's first live public performance was at his sixth grade talent show where he performed The Beatles' "Hey Jude." Woolf later became interested in music as a career, took singing lessons from an opera teacher, Bob Lischetti, and performed locally in Bradenton. He also was mentored at the Del Couch Music Education Foundation and went to Interlochen Arts Camp in Michigan for four weeks the summer after his second year of high school. In the summer of 2013, Woolf completed a five-week program at the Berklee College of Music and was selected as one of the top four songwriters for their singer showcase, where he performed an original song, "The Same." While he was in Boston, the audition for the thirteenth season of American Idol was held near Berklee College of Music and at his mother's suggestion, he decided to attend the audition. He attended Berklee College of Music, briefly, before pursuing his full time career as a singer songwriter.

== American Idol ==
Woolf auditioned in Boston, singing "Lego House" by Ed Sheeran. He sang "Waiting on the World to Change" on the first round in Hollywood, and his original composition entitled "I Tried" in the final solo of the Hollywood Round.

Episode	Theme	Song choice	Original artist	Order	Result
Audition	Auditioner's Choice	"Lego House"	Ed Sheeran	N/A	Advanced
Hollywood Round, Part 1	A Capella	"Waiting on the World to Change"	John Mayer	N/A	Advanced
Hollywood Round, Part 2	Group Performance	"Treasure" with Kristen O'Connor	Bruno Mars	N/A	Advanced
Hollywood Round, Part 3	Solo	"I Tried" (original composition)	Sam Woolf	N/A	Advanced
Top 31 (10 Men)	Personal Choice	"Babylon"	David Gray	4	Advanced
Top 13	This Is Me	"Unwell"	Matchbox Twenty	12	Safe
Top 12	Home	"Just One"	Blind Pilot	9	Safe
Top 11	Songs from the Cinema	"Come Together"	The Beatles	1	Bottom 3^{1}
Top 10	Billboard Top 10	"We Are Young"	Fun feat. Janelle Monáe	10	Safe
Top 9	I'm with the Band!	"Hey There Delilah"	Plain White T's	5	Bottom 3^{2}
Top 8	Back to the Start	Solo "Lego House"	Ed Sheeran	4	Saved^{3}
Top 8	Back to the Start	Duet "Lucky" with Malaya Watson	Jason Mraz & Colbie Caillat	8	Saved^{3}
Top 8^{4}	Songs from the 1980s	Duet "The Girl Is Mine" with Alex Preston	Michael Jackson & Paul McCartney	3	Safe
Top 8^{4}	Songs from the 1980s	Solo "Time After Time"	Cyndi Lauper	7	Safe
Top 7	Competitors' Choice	Duet "Let Her Go" with Alex Preston	Passenger	3	Safe
Top 7	Competitors' Choice	Solo "Sail Away"	David Gray	8	Safe
Top 6	Rock 'n' Roll	"It's Time"	Imagine Dragons	2	Safe
Top 6	Country	"You're Still the One"	Shania Twain	7	Safe
Top 5	America's Requests	Trio "Best Day of My Life" with Jena Irene & Alex Preston	American Authors	3	Eliminated
Top 5	America's Requests	Solo "Sing"	Ed Sheeran	5	Eliminated
Top 5	America's Requests	Solo "How to Save a Life"	The Fray	10	Eliminated

- ^Note 1 When Ryan Seacrest announced the results in this particular night, Woolf was among the bottom 3, but was declared safe first, as Ben Briley was eliminated.
- ^Note 2 When Ryan Seacrest announced the results in this particular night, Woolf was among the bottom 3, but was declared safe, as Majesty Rose was eliminated.
- ^Note 3 Woolf received the lowest number of votes; however, the judges decided to use their one save of the season to allow him to remain in the competition.
- ^Note 4 Due to the judges using their one save on Woolf, the top 8 remained intact for another week.

== Post-Idol ==
After his appearance on Idol, Woolf deferred for one year an offer of admissions to Berklee College of Music until fall 2015. Woolf performed nationally in the American Idol season 13 tour, then held a 'Welcome Home' concert in Bradenton, Florida at IMG Academy Stadium on September 27, 2014. He opened a similar homecoming concert for his fellow American Idol season 13 finalist, Alex Preston, at the Capitol Center For the Arts in Concord, New Hampshire on November 8, 2014, and on February 28, 2015, he performed in Lakewood Ranch, Florida's Winterfest, along with The Doobie Brothers, War, Jefferson Starship, Matt Walden and performers from the Del Couch Music Education Foundation.

Woolf wrote and recorded a five-song EP, Pretend, which he self-released on December 18, 2014. The album was partially crowdfunded and was produced by Danny Blume, who co-wrote some of the songs with Woolf.

On September 1, 2016, Woolf released the standalone single "Stop Thinking About It", and on January 1, 2017, he released the standalone single "Fast 'n' Dirty". Music videos were released for both singles. Woolf co-wrote "Fast 'n' Dirty" with Orion Meshorer and Stephen Puthon. Explaining the song, he said, "Never in a million years did I think I'd have a song called 'Fast and Dirty'...I'd just like to say that this song/video is supposed to be a joke, in a way...don't take it seriously." On April 19, 2017, he released the standalone single "Call Me Crazy", which features Christina Galligan. Woolf co-wrote "Call Me Crazy" with Meshorer and Parker James. On August 25, 2018, he released the standalone single "You", on August 12, 2020, he released the standalone single "Ease My Mind", and on October 1, 2021, he released the standalone single "Good Ol Times". On June 17, 2022, he released a cover of "Danny's Song" by Kenny Loggins. On January 1, 2023, he released the standalone single "Worst Thing", which he described as "the most honest song" he had "ever written"; on February 24, 2023, he released the standalone single, "Light Me Up"; and on July 28, 2023, he released the standalone single, "Bet on You", which he wrote with the Como Brothers.

Live at 89 North, a 2015 EP by the Como Brothers, features Woolf on a cover of "Hey Jude". Woolf and the Como Brothers have since continued to collaborate. In 2018, they released the single "On It" and announced an upcoming six-track EP titled Backbeat in the Morning. Leading up to the release of their EP, they have released three more tracks: "Diamonds on my Chain" in 2019, "Twisted" in January 2020, and "Coming Home" in September 2020. Backbeat in the Morning was recorded with Grammy-winning engineer Kenta Yonesaka at Germano Studios in New York City. Music videos have been released for all four songs. In 2022, Woolf and the Como Brothers released the song "Give a Little Love", and in 2023, they released the song "Boo Hoo".

Woolf has opened multiple concerts for We The Kings. He has also performed at Dream Fest in Tampa, Florida, the Warwick Summer Concert Series in New York, the Boston Arts Festival, and the Riverwalk Regatta in Florida. He often performs at events, both public and private, in Florida, the Midwest, and the Northeast.

== Discography ==
=== Extended plays ===
Title	Details	Peak chart positions
Title	Details	US Heatseeker
Pretend	Released: December 18, 2014; Self-released; Formats: CD, digital download	9

=== Singles ===
Year	Song	Album
2016	"Stop Thinking About It"	Non-album single
2017	"Fast 'n' Dirty"	Non-album single
2017	"Call Me Crazy" (featuring Christina Galligan)	Non-album single
2018	"You"	Non-album single
2020	"Ease My Mind"	Non-album single
2021	"Good Ol Times"	Non-album single
2022	"Danny's Song"	Non-album single
2023	"Worst Thing"	Non-album single
2023	"Light Me Up"	Non-album single
2023	"Bet on You"	Non-album single

=== As featured artist ===
Year	Song	Album
2015	"Hey Jude" (The Como Brothers featuring Sam Woolf)	Live at 89 North
2018	"On It" (The Como Brothers featuring Sam Woolf)	Backbeat in the Morning
2019	"Diamonds On My Chain" (The Como Brothers featuring Sam Woolf)	Backbeat in the Morning
2020	"Twisted" (The Como Brothers featuring Sam Woolf)	Backbeat in the Morning
2020	"Coming Home" (The Como Brothers featuring Sam Woolf)	Backbeat in the Morning
2022	"Give a Little Love" (The Como Brothers featuring Sam Woolf)	N/A
2023	"Boo Hoo" (The Como Brothers featuring Sam Woolf)	N/A

=== American Idol digital singles ===
Year	Song	Album
2014	"We Are Young"	Non-album single
2014	"Hey There Delilah"	Non-album single
2014	"Lego House"	Non-album single
2014	"Time After Time"	Non-album single
2014	"Sail Away"	Non-album single
2014	"You're Still the One"	Non-album single
2014	"How to Save a Life"	Non-album single
