= Majesty Rose =

American singer (born 1992)

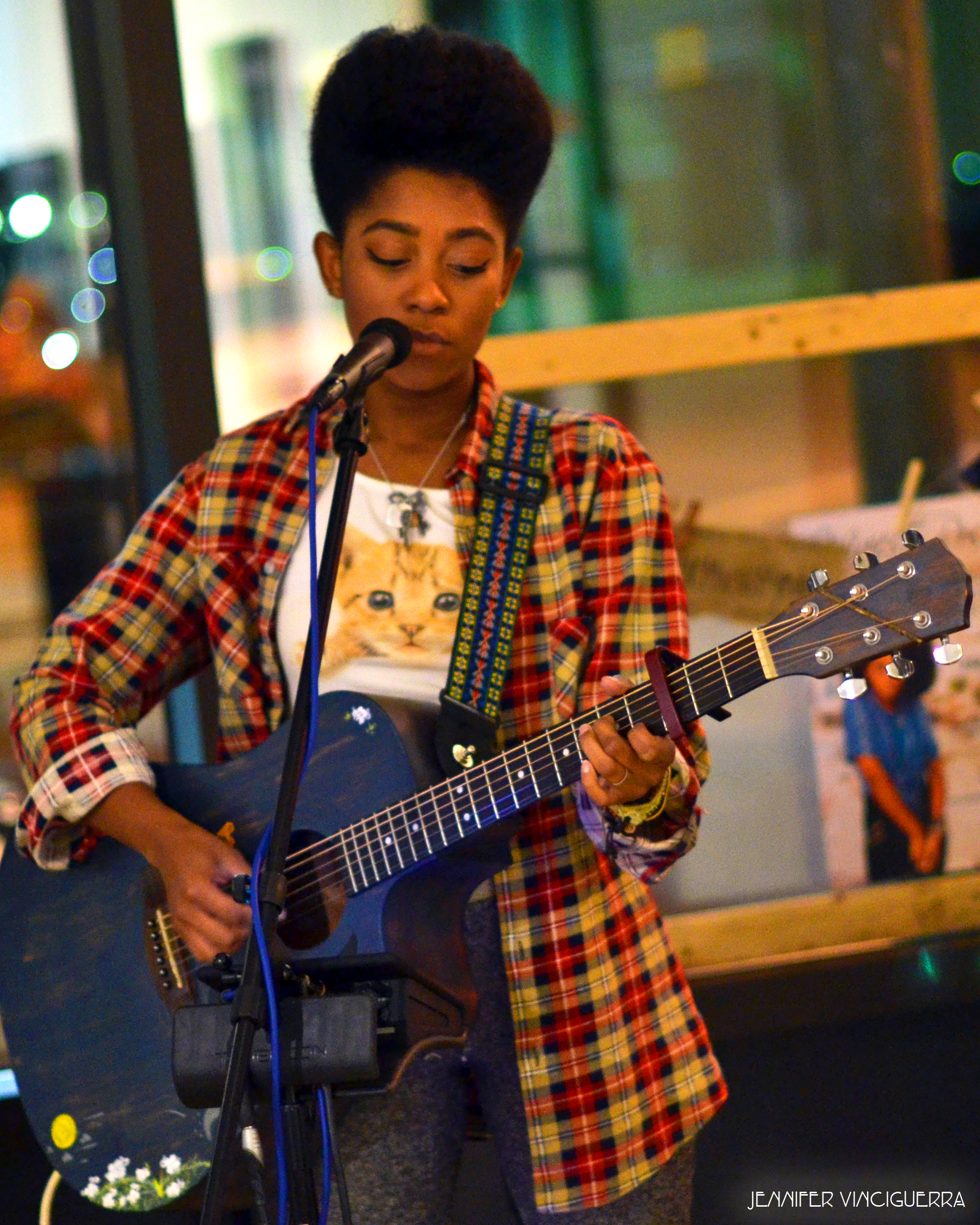

Background information
- Born: Majesty Rochelle York; February 29, 1992 (age 34); Goldsboro, North Carolina, U.S.
- Genres: Pop
- Occupation: Singer
- Instruments: Vocals, guitar
- Years active: 2014–present

Majesty Rochelle York (born February 29, 1992), better known as Majesty Rose, is an American singer and songwriter. After placing ninth place on the thirteenth season of American Idol, she released the EP, Bloom, in 2016, and the standalone single, "Plunge", in 2017. She then joined with Maverick City Music for the 2019 EP Maverick City Vol. 2, which peaked at number 11 on Billboard's Heatseekers Albums chart. Rose rejoined with Maverick City Music for the 2020 albums Maverick City Vol. 3 Part 1 and Maverick City Christmas, which each peaked in the top five on Billboard's Top Gospel Albums chart.

== Early life ==
Majesty Rose was born on February 29, 1992, to Lori Grant and Rickey York. Rose began writing at age ten and taught herself the acoustic guitar at seventeen. Despite her skills as a singer and guitarist, she has never taken formal lessons.

She was a student at the Eastern Wayne High School and graduated in 2010. She also attended Wayne Community College and participated in SGA (Student Government Association). She worked as a preschool teacher at the Goldsboro Family YMCA before appearing on American Idol. Rose is known in her community for serving at multiple churches and volunteering at nursing homes and community outreach projects.

According to Rose, she changed her name from Majesty Rochelle York to Majesty Rose as a dare going into American Idol. She always wished her name was "Rose".

== American Idol ==
Rose took part in a competition at The American Idol Experience in Disney's Hollywood Studios while she was on a holiday with her best friend's family in Florida. Rose sang the song "Reflection" from film Mulan and won a ticket to audition in front of the producers on American Idol.

In the results show for the top 11-week, Rose was in the bottom 3, but ultimately Ben Briley was eliminated. In the following week she was again in the bottom 3, but ultimately MK Nobilette was eliminated. Rose herself, was eliminated in the top 9.

Episode	Theme	Song choice	Original artist	Order	Result
Audition	Auditioner's Choice	"Violet Hill"	Coldplay	N/A	Advanced
Hollywood Round, Part 1	A Capella	"1234"	Feist	N/A	Advanced
Hollywood Round, Part 2	Group Performance	"Stars"	Grace Potter and the Nocturnals	N/A	Advanced
Hollywood Round, Part 3	Solo	"Stars"	Grace Potter and the Nocturnals	N/A	Advanced
Top 20 (10 Women)	Personal Choice	"Happy"	Pharrell Williams	1	Safe
Top 13	This Is Me	"Tightrope"	Janelle Monáe feat. Big Boi	7	Safe
Top 12	Home	"Fix You"	Coldplay	12	Safe
Top 11	Songs from the Cinema	"Let It Go"	Idina Menzel	6	Bottom 3 (Note: When Ryan Seacrest announced the results in this particular night, Majesty Rose was among the bottom 3, but was declared safe second, as Ben Briley was eliminated.)
Top 10	Billboard Top 10	"Wake Me Up"	Avicii	9	Bottom 3 (Note: When Ryan Seacrest announced the results for this particular night, Majesty Rose was among the Bottom 3, but was declared safe first, as MK Nobilette was eliminated.)
Top 9	I'm with the Band!	"Shake It Out"	Florence and the Machine	2	Eliminated

== Post-Idol ==
Rose released an EP, titled Bloom, in June 2016. The EP received a positive review from Mark Franklin of The York Dispatch's blog, Idol Chatter. Rose then released the non-album single "Plunge" in 2017.

A few years later, Rose joined with Maverick City Music for multiple releases, starting with the 2019 EP Maverick City Vol. 2, which features her on the track "You Keep on Getting Better". This EP peaked at number 11 on Billboard's Heatseekers Albums chart, at number 29 on the Top Independent Albums chart, and at number 35 on the Top Christian Albums chart. Rose then returned for the 2020 albums Maverick City Vol. 3 Part 1 and Maverick City Christmas. Maverick City Vol. 3 Part 1 features Rose on the track "Love is a Miracle". This album peaked at number two on the Top Gospel Albums chart and at number six on the Top Christian Albums chart. It also won the Billboard Music Award for Top Gospel Album. Maverick City Christmas features Rose on the tracks "Joyful Joyful We Adore Thee / Angels We Have Heard on High" and "The First Noel". This album peaked at number four on the Top Gospel Albums chart.

== Discography ==
=== EPs ===
Year	Title
2016	Bloom

=== Singles ===
Year	Title	Album
2016	Plunge	Non-album single

=== As featured artist ===
Year	Title	Peak chart positions			
Year	Title	Top Christian Albums	Top Gospel Albums	Heatseekers Albums	Top Independent Albums
2019	Maverick City Vol. 2	35		11	29
2020	Maverick City Vol. 3 Part 1	6	2		
2020	Maverick City Christmas		4		
