= Ben Briley =

American singer from Gallatin, Tennessee

- Born: John Benjamin Briley; March 19, 1989 (age 37); Gallatin, Tennessee, United States
- Genres: Country; southern rock
- Occupation: Singer
- Instruments: Vocals; guitar; piano; harmonica; banjo; dobro
- Years active: 2014–present

John Benjamin Briley (born March 19, 1989) is an American singer-songwriter from Gallatin, Tennessee, who finished in 11th place on the thirteenth season of American Idol. During college, he joined a gospel group called "25 Drive", with which he released an album. In 2014, he released the country music EP Outlier.

== Personal life ==
Briley was born in Gallatin, Tennessee to John R. Briley and Tribby Graves. Briley has a large extended family – from his grandparents down, he has around one-hundred-and-twenty relatives. Music has been an important aspect of his family for several generations, especially on his mother's side: his great-grandmother, Kitty Cora Cline, was one of the first female members of the Grand Ole Opry; her daughter, Gladys Cline Graves, wrote songs and poetry, but did not pursue a career, as she had eleven children and chose to focus on raising them instead. From 1975 to 1985, Briley's mother sang and played guitar on a morning T.V. show hosted by Ralph Emery. Several members of Briley's family on his father's side have played guitar, banjo, bass, and fiddle. Briley's father and grandfather, Wesley Briley, were both ministers, and Wesley also owned a farm. Growing up, Briley would often work on the farm with his grandfather, whom he greatly admired. Briley married his wife Courtney (who is a friend and former high school classmate of American Idol season 12 fifth place finalist Janelle Arthur) in June 2013 and was inspired by her to try out for American Idol.

Briley began singing at a very young age – his first performance was at a family Christmas party when he was only three years old. He won several talent shows during grade school, and when he was eleven years old, he performed the National Anthem at a Vanderbilt University basketball game. In second grade, Briley was inspired by the devotion that he felt for his younger sister, Mary Meggan, to request that his school observe a special holiday for siblings. The school adopted his idea, and Brothers and Sisters Day spread throughout Tennessee. It was recognized by then-governor Don Sundquist and became an official holiday for the state. Al Gore, who was vice-president at the time, heard about it and told President Bill Clinton, who then designated the third week of November as National Family Week. Later, President George W. Bush also responded to the idea and declared June 2, 2001, as National Child's Day.

Briley can play over twelve instruments, including the guitar, piano, banjo, harmonica, and dobro. His primary musical influence is Johnny Cash, and his style encompasses a wide variety of genres, including country, gospel, bluegrass, southern rock, R&B, and blues. While attending Gallatin High School, Briley was elected student body president. He considered pursuing a career in politics. He joined a musical group called "The Performers" during high school, and sang with them at various school events, as well as for the Tennessee General Assembly. Although he is a devoted fan of the University of Tennessee's Tennessee Vols, Briley attended Middle Tennessee State University, where he served as an anchor for campus sports and received a degree in broadcasting, marketing, and public relations. He continued to pursue music during college, performing with multiple bands in coffee houses and joining a gospel group called "25 Drive". He released an album with this group and together, they participated in the National Quartet Convention.

== American Idol ==
Episode	Theme	Song choice	Original artist	Order	Result
Audition	Auditioner's Choice	"Arms of a Woman"	Amos Lee	N/A	Advanced
Hollywood Round, Part 1	A Capella	"Stars"	Grace Potter and the Nocturnals	N/A	Advanced
Hollywood Round, Part 2	Group Performance	"I Want It That Way" with Dexter Roberts and Casey Thrasher	Backstreet Boys	N/A	Advanced
Hollywood Round, Part 3	Solo	"Stars"	Grace Potter and the Nocturnals	N/A	Advanced
Top 31 (10 Men)	Personal Choice	"Soulshine"	The Allman Brothers Band	9	Advanced
Top 13	This Is Me	"Folsom Prison Blues"	Johnny Cash	4	Safe
Top 12	Home	"Turning Home"	David Nail	11	Safe
Top 11	Songs from the Cinema	"Bennie and the Jets"	Elton John	5	Eliminated

== Post-Idol career ==
After his participation on American Idol, Briley released an EP, titled, Outlier, in December 2014. Outlier received positive attention from the Lebanon Democrat and The York Dispatch. Holly Tong wrote in the Lebanon Democrat that Outlier "showcases [Briley's] individuality and versatility".

== Discography ==
=== Extended plays ===
Title	Details
Outlier	Release date: December 11, 2014; Label: Independent; Formats: CD, music download
