= MK Nobilette =

American singer

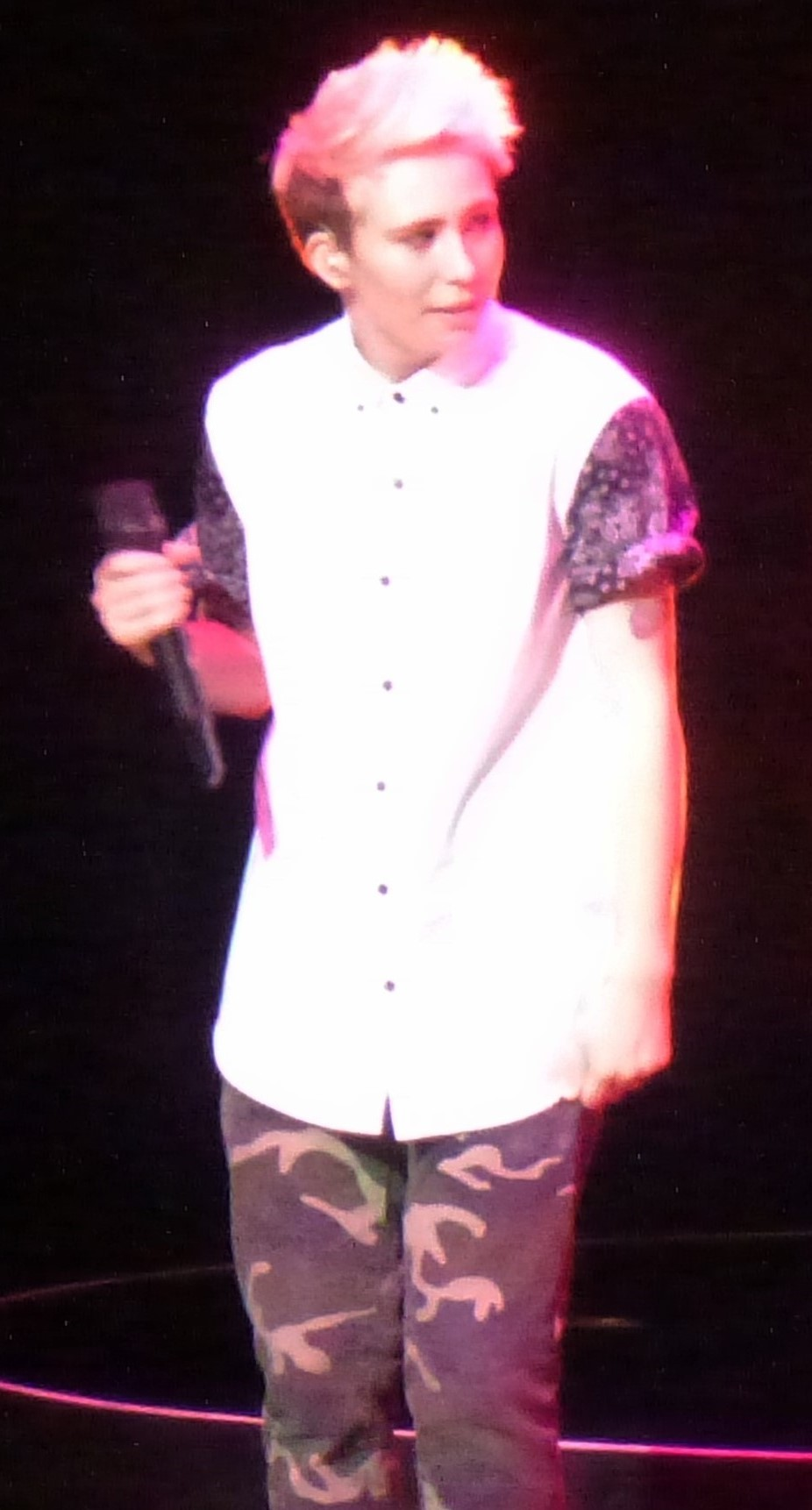

Background information
- Born: Michaela Anne Nobilette; August 20, 1993 (age 33); San Francisco, California, United States
- Genre: Pop
- Occupation: Singer
- Instruments: Vocals, guitar
- Years active: 2014–present
- Label: Velvet Rhythm Entertainment

Michaela Anne Nobilette (born August 20, 1993), also Emkay Brazil, most commonly known as MK Nobilette, is an American singer from San Francisco, California, who finished in tenth place on the thirteenth season of American Idol.

While on American Idol, she became the first openly gay contestant in the history of the series to acknowledge her sexuality on air. She was also American Idol's first openly gay female finalist. (Note: Will Young, the 2002 winner of Pop Idol, the contest on which all the other Idol series are based, never hid being gay, but did come out publicly after he won, preempting a tabloid newspaper outing him.; Jim Verraros, American Idol (season 1) (2002) had discussed being gay in online journals which the show forced him to take down, not due his sexuality, but because they felt he might be trying to get extra votes. He came out after he finished the show and tour.; Vanessa Olivarez, American Idol (season 2) (2003) came out to other contestants, behind the scenes, but not on the show.; Clay Aiken, American Idol (season 2) (2003) runner-up came out as gay in 2008, after many years of speculation, and denying he was gay.; David Hernandez, American Idol (season 7) (2008), was assumed to be gay because he was revealed to have worked as a nude male stripper at a gay strip club. He has since come out as gay. FOX made no disclosure of his dancing prior to his elimination, and AI has also had female strippers, not holding the work against them.; Adam Lambert, American Idol (season 8) (2009) runner-up, was outed during the final week of the competition – "he was the favourite to win until some pictures of him with another bloke mysteriously made their way into the public domain the week of the final" – although he had come out of the closet when he was 18, in 2000. Mainstream media speculated on the readiness of American Idol voters for an openly gay winner. He confirmed that he was gay in a Rolling Stone cover interview shortly after he was named runner-up. Nobilette is the only out woman to compete in the finals.)

Nobilette released a single, "Make Believe", in 2015.

== Musical influences ==
She cited her earliest musical influence as The Little Mermaid, and more recently soul singer and musician Allen Stone.

== Career ==
=== 2014–present: American Idol ===
Nobilette was one of 75,000 contestants to audition for the thirteenth season of American Idol. She sang for the initial cattle call judges at San Francisco's AT&T Park in July 2013 along with approximately 1,000 other hopefuls. She became one of the top 13 finalists in February 2014. She has been praised for her "vocal ability and likable demeanor" as well as her "soulful rasp".

When flown into Hollywood for the next rounds of the competition, Nobilette was one of many contestants who had to "sing for their lives" in a special "Hollywood or Home" round to see if they would go through right there, or be put back on the plane. Contestants were eliminated soon after they landed at LAX airport before they would get to proceed to Hollywood. The celebrity judges, Harry Connick Jr., Jennifer Lopez and Keith Urban, were uncertain of 52 contestants, each was asked to perform solo in an airplane hangar, with 32 ultimately sent back to the airport.

Although the judges showed support, and generally praised her, Nobilette was in the bottom rankings with the public votes in the first weeks of the combined men and women shows. In the Top 13 and Top 12 shows she was among the bottom three. For the Top 11-week, "Songs from the Cinema," the results of which would determine the top ten finalists, who would be included on the annual American Idols LIVE! Tour 2014, Nobilette performed "Make You Feel My Love." Two covers of the song, one each from Garth Brooks, and Trisha Yearwood, were featured on the soundtrack of the film Hope Floats (1998). The original was by Bob Dylan, and Nobilette stated she performed the song in a recital during her time in high school, and loved most of the covers of the song.

She did not appear in the American Idol 2014 Finale due to feeling ill at the time.

In the fall of 2014, it was reported that Nobilette signed a record deal with Velvet Rhythm Entertainment, a San Francisco-based label. Her debut single "Make Believe" was released on May 12, 2015.

==== Performances and results ====
Performances:
Episode	Theme	Song choice	Original artist	Order	Result
Audition	Auditioner's Choice	"If I Were Your Woman"	Gladys Knight & the Pips	N/A	Advanced
Hollywood Round, Part 1	A Cappella	Not aired	Allen Stone	N/A	Advanced
Hollywood Round, Part 2	Group Performance	"Royals" with Briana Oakley	Lorde	N/A	Advanced
Hollywood Round, Part 3	Solo	"The A Team"	Ed Sheeran	N/A	Advanced
Top 31 (10 Women)	Personal Choice	"All of Me"	John Legend	9	Advanced
Top 13	This Is Me	"Satisfaction"	Allen Stone	6	Bottom 3 (Note: When Ryan Seacrest announced the results in this particular night, Nobilette was among the bottom 3, but was declared safe first, as Kristen O'Connor was eliminated.)
Top 12	Home	"Drops of Jupiter (Tell Me)"	Train	7	Bottom 3 (Note: When Ryan Seacrest announced the results in this particular night, Nobilette was among the bottom 3, but was declared safe second, as Emily Piriz was eliminated.)
Top 11	Songs From The Cinema	"To Make You Feel My Love"	Bob Dylan	8	Safe
Top 10	Billboard Top 10	"Perfect"	Pink	1	Eliminated

== Personal life ==
Nobilette was adopted and raised by two lesbian women and is publicly out as lesbian, which she talked about during her initial audition for the American Idol celebrity judges, which was aired. She stated to the judges, "I'm very obviously gay, and there are always going to be people in America and everywhere else who are definitely going to hate me. But I think in the last two years there have been a lot of things that have really changed that, and have made it a positive thing." She is the first finalist to be openly gay going into the top contestants round; other contestants were not public with their information, and came out publicly after their finals. Her moms separated when she was four, and both now have girlfriends, resulting in a large extended family, which Nobilette characterized as "very San Francisco."

She lives in San Francisco, previously with her girlfriend Casey Ellis, who is also her vocal coach, and accompanist. The couple regularly serenaded one another. In a "5 Things" segment she noted that she has played soccer all her life and also enjoys snowboarding. Nobilette is currently a student. Nobilette and Ellis have split since Nobilette's Idol appearances.

Nobilette was raised Jewish. She graduated high school in 2012 from Ruth Asawa San Francisco School of the Arts (Vocal department).
