= Alex Preston (singer) =

American singer (born 1993)

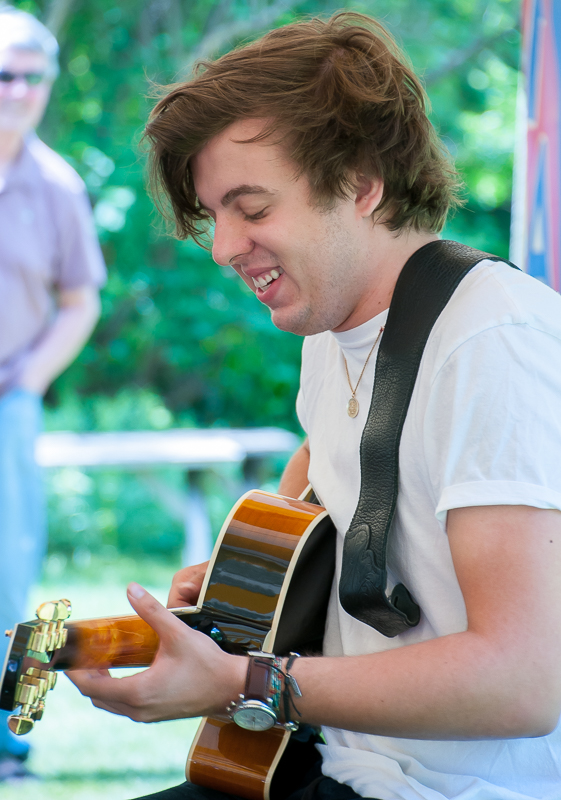

Background information
- Born: Alex Preston Philbrick; May 6, 1993 (age 33); Boston, Massachusetts, United States
- Genres: Indie folk; folk-pop; folk rock; indie pop
- Occupations: Singer-songwriter; musicians
- Instruments: Vocals; guitar
- Years active: 2014–present

Alex Preston Philbrick (born May 6, 1993), better known as Alex Preston, is an American singer-songwriter who first came to prominence as the third-place finalist on the thirteenth season of American Idol. His self-titled debut album was released on July 21, 2015, and his second album, A Work in Progress, was released in 2018.

== Early life ==
Alex Preston was born and raised in Mont Vernon, New Hampshire. He wrote his first song called "Fish Food" when he was 12. He attended Souhegan High School in Amherst, New Hampshire where he played the guitar in a jazz band, and in the percussion section in concert and a marching band. He also formed a band with friends, Dustin Newhouse, Josh Brackett and Tucker Brown, called Undertow. He graduated from high school in 2011, and studied at the University of New Hampshire.

Preston has written songs with his cousin Jo Dee Messina, the rock band Framing Hanley, and Aria Summer. His song was used on the album "Voices for Heroes," a benefit for Sandy Hook. He won the "Open For MixFest" competition organized by a radio station to open for acts such as Backstreet Boys, Gavin DeGraw and Of Monsters and Men. His single "The Light Was Already Here" was released in September 2013.

== American Idol ==
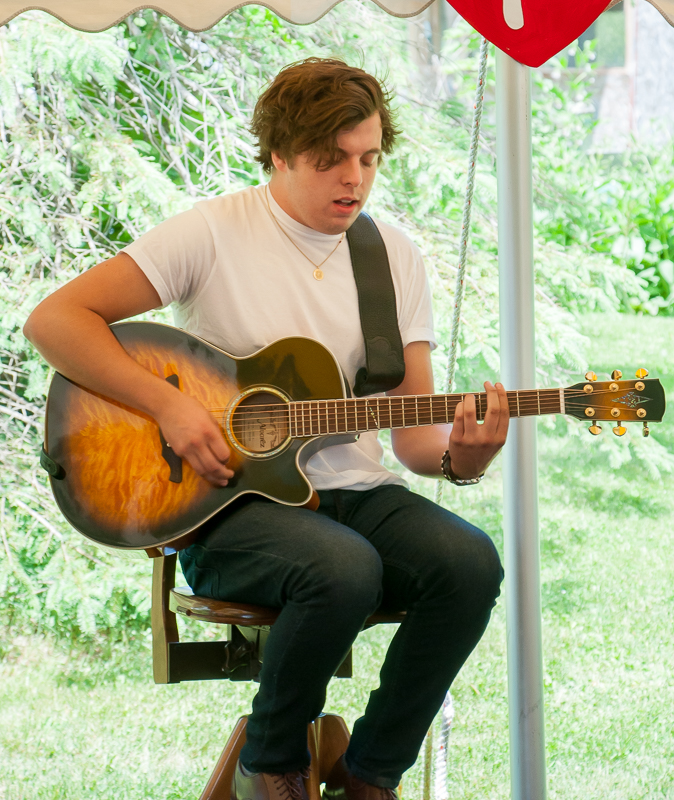
Alex Preston performing in 2015, shortly after placing third on American Idol.

Episode	Theme	Song choice	Original artist	Order	Result
Audition	Auditioner's Choice	"Fairytales" (original composition)	Alex Preston	N/A	Advanced
Hollywood Round, Part 1	A Capella	"Scream & Shout"	will.i.am feat. Britney Spears	N/A	Advanced
Hollywood Round, Part 2	Group Performance	Not aired	Not aired	N/A	Advanced
Hollywood Round, Part 3	Solo	"Fairytales" (original composition)	Alex Preston	N/A	Advanced
Top 31 (10 Men)	Personal Choice	"Volcano"	Damien Rice	7	Advanced
Top 13	This Is Me	"A Beautiful Mess"	Jason Mraz	9	Safe
Top 12	Home	"I Don't Want to Be"	Gavin DeGraw	2	Safe
Top 11	Songs from the Cinema	"Falling Slowly"	Glen Hansard & Markéta Irglová	9	Safe
Top 10	Billboard Top 10	"Story of My Life"	One Direction	4	Safe
Top 9	I'm with the Band!	"Don't Speak"	No Doubt	1	Safe
Top 8	Back to the Start	Duet "Just Give Me a Reason" with Jena Irene	Pink feat. Nate Ruess	2	Safe
Top 8	Back to the Start	Solo "Fairytales" (original composition)	Alex Preston	12	Safe
Top 8 (Note: Due to the judges using their one save on Sam Woolf, the top 8 remained intact for another week.)	Songs from the 1980s	Duet "The Girl Is Mine" with Sam Woolf	Michael Jackson & Paul McCartney	3	Safe
Top 8	Songs from the 1980s	Solo "Every Breath You Take"	The Police	9	Safe
Top 7	Competitors' Choice	Duet "Let Her Go" with Sam Woolf	Passenger	3	Safe
Top 7	Competitors' Choice	Solo "The A Team"	Ed Sheeran	7	Safe
Top 6	Rock 'n' Roll	"Animal"	Neon Trees	4	Safe
Top 6	Country	"Always on My Mind"	Brenda Lee	9	Safe
Top 5	America's Requests	Solo "Sweater Weather"	The Neighbourhood	1	Safe
Top 5	America's Requests	Trio "Best Day of My Life" with Jena Irene & Sam Woolf	American Authors	3	Safe
Top 5	America's Requests	Solo "Say Something"	A Great Big World & Christina Aguilera	8	Safe
Top 4	Love Songs	"Too Close"	Alex Clare	3	Safe
Top 4	Love Songs	"I'm Yours"	Jason Mraz	8	Safe
Top 4	Love Songs	"Yellow"	Coldplay	12	Safe
Top 3	Randy Jackson's Choice	"Pompeii"	Bastille	2	Eliminated
Top 3	Judges' Choice	"Stay"	Rihanna feat. Mikky Ekko	5	Eliminated
Top 3	Hometown's Choice	"Story of My Life"	One Direction	8	Eliminated

== 2014–2019: Alex Preston album and A Work in Progress ==
His debut, self-titled album was recorded in a cabin in Lone Pine, California and was released in 2015. His second album, A Work in Progress, was released in 2018. In 2019, he won a New England Emmy Award in the Special Event Coverage category for the program NH Chronicle Presents New Hampshire Idol.

== Discography ==
=== Albums ===
- Alex Preston (2015)
1. "Break My Heart"
2. "You"
3. "Fairytales"
4. "The Light Was Already Here"
5. "Close to You"
6. "200 Miles"
7. "The Author"
8. "Get Up, Get Down"
9. "Love Letters"
- A Work in Progress (2018)

=== Digital singles ===
Year	Song	Album
2013	"The Light Was Already Here"	Non-album single
2014	"Story of My Life"	Non-album single
2014	"Don't Speak"	Non-album single
2014	"Fairytales"	Non-album single
2014	"Every Breath You Take"	Non-album single
2014	"The A Team"	Non-album single
2014	"Animal"	Non-album single
2014	"Say Something"	Non-album single
2014	"Too Close"	Non-album single
