= UN (album) =

Studio album by Dan Black
- Released: 13 July 2009 (UK)
- Recorded: 2009
- Genres: Alternative dance, wonky pop, electronic
- Length: 45:55
- Labels: A&M; Polydor; The:Hours
- Producer: Dan Black

Dan Black chronology
UN (2009)	Do Not Revenge (2017)

Singles from UN
- 1. "Yours" Released: 1 December 2008; 2. "Symphonies" Released: 29 June 2009; 3. "Wonder" Released: 2010; 4. "U + Me =" Released: 2010; 5. "Alone" Released: October 2010

UN (styled as ((UN))) is the debut studio album by British singer-songwriter Dan Black, the former lead singer of the alternative rock band, The Servant. The album was released in the UK on 13 July 2009 by Polydor, and later in the United States on 16 February 2010 by A&M Records.

The album was recorded entirely by Black and debuted to generally mixed reviews from music critics, with some praising its sound and others denouncing its lack of originality.

== Conception ==
Black spent a year creating material for the album, writing over seventy songs. However, Black later referred to many of them as 'rubbish'. Prince, DJ Shadow, Beck, and De La Soul have all been cited as having a significant influence on the album. Black conceived the title UN meaning "one" in order to signify his debut album.

However, Black has stated that the album's title also refers to its substance, such as, "un-rock, un-hip hop, un-everything".

== Recording ==
Black recorded the album entirely on his laptop in the basement of his apartment in Paris, in a span of two months. In the studio, Black would work alone as long as twelve hours at a time. Except for the mixing and mastering, Black created the album by himself exclusively.

== Singles ==
"Symphonies", the album's first official single, was released as the U.S. iTunes "Single of the Week" for the week of 28 December 2009. A remix of the song was recorded with Kid Cudi, and was released as a bonus track for the American release of the album. Both versions of the song received heavy airplay on Nova and Triple J networks in Australia as well as alternative radio worldwide. The remix version of the song, featuring Kid Cudi, is also included on NBA 2K11.

"Wonder" was released as soundtrack in EA Sports game, FIFA 11.

"U + Me =" was released as a radio single in Australia on Triple J.

A promo CD of "Wonder" was sent to Australian radio on 5 November 2010.

== Track listing ==
All songs written and composed by Dan Black.

No.	Title	Length
1.	"Symphonies"	3:41
2.	"U + Me ="	3:11
3.	"Ecstasy"	4:11
4.	"Alone"	3:33
5.	"Cocoon"	4:22
6.	"Yours"	3:27
7.	"Pump My Pumps"	3:35
8.	"Wonder"	3:41
9.	"Cigarette Pack"	4:16
10.	"Life Slash Dreams"	3:46
11.	"I Love Life"	3:12
12.	"Let Go"	5:00
Total length:		45:55

U.S. Edition
No.	Title	Length
13.	"Symphonies" (featuring Kid Cudi)	3:41
14.	"Poet"	2:57
15.	"Karate Kid"	4:27

Sample credits

- "Symphonies" contains an uncredited sample from "Starman Leaves", written by Jack Nitzsche, and performed by the City of Prague Philharmonic Orchestra; and uncredited elements from "Umbrella", written by Christopher Stewart, Terius Nash, Kuk Harrell, and Shawn Carter, and performed by Rihanna.

== Critical reception ==
Professional ratings
Review scores
Source	Rating
Allmusic	3.5/5 stars
BBC Music	(favourable)
The Guardian	3/5 stars
The Independent	4/5 stars
musicOMH	3/5 stars
NME	(unfavourable)
PopMatters	(8/10)
Rave	2/5 stars
Spin	(6/10)
The Telegraph	4/5 stars

Critical response to the album has been mixed, with some critics praising Black's blend of sounds and others criticizing his lack of originality. According to Metacritic, which assigns a normalized rating out of 100 to reviews from mainstream critics, the album holds a score of 67/100, indicating "generally favorable reviews", based on ten reviews. Lou Thomas of BBC wrote a favorable review of the album, stating, "Dan Black has made a smart, confident record that is far more accessible than many made by such an overtly cool customer." Andy Gill of The Independent also wrote favorably of the album, calling it "An impressive debut." Neil McCormick of The Telegraph gave the album 4 out of 5 stars, complimenting Black's new image and describing the record as "smart, addictive future pop." A reviewer from Mojo, impressed with the album, stated, "Black's chops and tunes suggest he won't stay underground."

However, not all reviews were favorable. Dave Simpson of The Guardian gave the album 3 out of 5 stars, stating, "His whiny vocals grate after a while, and while tracks like Yours offer fabulous - if soulless - computerised funk, the impact of the discoid stomper Pump By Pumps is rather dulled when you realise the tune had a previous life as Cliff Richard's Devil Woman." Barry Walters of Spin, who gave the album a six out of ten, stated the album's lead single "epitomizes the downbeat side of Black's knack for recycling divergent styles into cinematic synth pop." However, Walters also complimented Dan's style, stating, "the album works best when Black's mood swings between Technicolor dreams and depressing quotidian details."" Louis Pattison of NME also wrote an unfavorable review, stating that the "Truth is, Dan Black surfed this hype wave by doing a clever thing with bits of other people’s songs. 'Symphonies' aside, he’s still got to find himself in them." Chris Parkin of Dot Music also wrote unfavorably of the album, stating, "However much electro trickery he has at his fingertips, he needs some songs first." Chad Parkhill of Rave, criticized the album's lack of coherence, calling it "the kind of one-man creative enterprise that demonstrates exactly the perils of going it alone."

== Personnel ==
- Dan Black - all instruments
- John C.F. Davis - mastering
- Tom Elmhirst - mixdown

== Accolades ==
Title	Award	Nominated work	Result
2010 MTV Video Music Awards	Best Special Effects in a Video	"Symphonies"	Nominated
2010 MTV Video Music Awards	Breakthrough Video	"Symphonies"	Nominated

== Release history ==
Country	Date	Label
United Kingdom	13 July 2009	Polydor Records
United States	16 February 2010	Polydor Records
