= Starman (1984 film) =

1984 film by John Carpenter

- Theatrical release poster
- Directed by: John Carpenter
- Written by: Bruce A. Evans; Raynold Gideon
- Produced by: Larry J. Franco
- Starring: Jeff Bridges; Karen Allen; Charles Martin Smith; Richard Jaeckel
- Cinematography: Donald M. Morgan
- Edited by: Marion Rothman
- Music by: Jack Nitzsche
- Color process: Metrocolor
- Production companies: Industrial Light & Magic; Delphi II Productions
- Distributed by: Columbia Pictures
- Release date: December 14, 1984
- Running time: 115 minutes
- Country: United States
- Language: English
- Budget: $24 million
- Box office: $28.7 million (domestic)

Starman is a 1984 American science fiction romance drama film directed by John Carpenter and written by Bruce A. Evans and Raynold Gideon, with Dean Riesner making uncredited rewrites.

The film tells the story of a relationship between recently widowed Jenny Hayden (Karen Allen) and Starman, a non-corporeal alien who has come to Earth and cloned the human body of her deceased husband Scott (portrayed by Jeff Bridges), in response to the invitation found on the gold phonograph record installed on the Voyager 2 space probe.

The film received positive reviews but faltered in its initial box office debut. Bridges was nominated for the Academy Award for Best Actor for his role. It inspired the short-lived Starman television series in 1986.

== Plot ==
Starman is a love story. It's It Happened One Night. It's all the classic stories of star-crossed lovers, the lovers who can't really make it together but have a bond of love...

— John Carpenter

The Voyager 2 space probe, launched in 1977, carries a phonographic disc with a message of peace, inviting alien civilizations to visit Earth. The probe is intercepted by an alien ship traveling through space which then sends a scout vessel to establish first contact with Earth. Instead of greeting the vessel, the U.S. government shoots it down. Crashing in Chequamegon Bay, Wisconsin, the lone alien occupant, looking like a floating ball of energy, finds the home of recently widowed Jenny Hayden. He uses a lock of hair from her deceased husband Scott, to clone a body for himself. The alien "Starman" has seven spheres with him which provide energy to perform miraculous feats. The alien uses the first sphere to send a message to his people stating that Earth is hostile and his spacecraft was destroyed. He arranges to rendezvous with them in three days' time. He then uses the second sphere in self-defense and the third to create a holographic map of the United States, coercing Jenny into taking him to the rendezvous in Arizona.

Jenny, however, attempts to escape. Having a very basic understanding of the English language from the phonographic disk, the Starman learns to communicate with Jenny and assures her that he means no harm. He explains that if he does not reach the rendezvous point, Arizona's Barringer Crater, in three days, he will die. Jenny teaches the Starman how to drive a car and use credit cards, so he can continue the journey alone. When he resurrects a dead deer, she is moved and decides to stay with him. The authorities pursue the pair across the country. A police officer shoots and critically wounds Jenny. To escape, the Starman crashes their car into a gas tanker and uses another sphere to protect them from the explosion. They take refuge in a mobile home that is being towed. He uses another sphere to heal Jenny. After being assured that she will recover, he proceeds to hitchhike toward Arizona without her, but Jenny reaches him while he and his driver are stopped at a roadblock. Reunited, they hitchhike together, resuming their journey towards the crater.

Later, while stowing away on a railroad boxcar, the two have sex. The Starman tells Jenny, "I gave you a baby tonight." She reveals that she is infertile, but he assures her that she is pregnant. He explains that Scott is the posthumous father, as Starman used Scott's DNA to clone himself. As a child also of Starman, their son will possess all the Starman's knowledge and will grow up to be a teacher. Starman offers to stop the pregnancy if she wishes, but Jenny embraces him, accepting the gift. They accidentally travel too far on the train and arrive in Las Vegas. Jenny loses her wallet. The Starman uses one of their last quarters in a slot machine, which he manipulates to win the $500,000 jackpot. They buy a Cadillac to complete their journey to Arizona.

National Security Agency director George Fox learns that the Starman's flight trajectory, prior to being shot down, was to the Barringer Crater. So, he arranges to have the Army capture the Starman, dead or alive. SETI scientist Mark Shermin, another government official involved in the case, criticizes Fox's heavy-handed approach and reminds him that the Starman was invited to Earth. Appalled to learn that Fox is planning to vivisect the alien, Shermin then resolves to help the Starman escape rather than let Fox capture him.

Jenny and the dying Starman reach the crater as Army helicopters pursue them. Just as they are surrounded, a large spaceship appears and descends into the crater. Light surrounds the couple and the Starman is fully healed. While preparing to leave, he tells Jenny he will never see her again. Jenny asks him to take her with him, but he says she would die on his world. He then gives her his last sphere, saying that their son will know what to do with it. Jenny watches as the ship departs.

== Cast ==
- Jeff Bridges as Scott Hayden / Starman
- Karen Allen as Jenny Hayden
- Charles Martin Smith as Mark Shermin
- Richard Jaeckel as George Fox
- Robert Phalen as Major Bell
- Tony Edwards as Sergeant Lemon
- John Walter Davis as Brad Heinmuller
- Ted White as Deer Hunter
- Dirk Blocker as Cop #1
- M. C. Gainey as Cop #2
- George Buck Flower as Cook (as Buck Flower)
- Ralph Cosham as Marine Lieutenant
- Lu Leonard as Roadhouse Waitress
- Mickey Jones as Truck Driver
- David Wells as Fox's Assistant
- Ronald Colby as Cafe Owner

== Production ==
Starman spent five years in development at Columbia. The original script by Bruce A. Evans and Raynold Gideon was purchased by the studio at the urging of executive producer Michael Douglas, shortly before it optioned Steven Spielberg's Night Skies. Evans and Gideon's first, and only, rewrite was rejected by both the studio and Douglas. Screenwriter Dean Riesner came onto the project in late 1981 after director Mark Rydell left the project due to artistic differences with Douglas. Riesner had no idea that he would spend over two years struggling with the incessant demand for rewrites—he eventually authored five rewrites of Starman with six different directors, but did not receive screen credit because, according to him, "the Writers Guild, in their infinite wisdom, decided I didn't contribute 50 percent of the screenplay." Carpenter personally campaigned for Riesner's credit; advocating Evans and Gideon's initial draft was an entirely different movie (than the shooting script Riesner later authored)—Carpenter said that the alien actually flew around like Superman in the initial script. Carpenter was reportedly outraged when the WGA arbitration ruled in favor of original writers, Gideon and Evans. The director resolved to thank his screenwriter by including an on-screen dedication to Riesner in the film's end credits sequence. The Writers' Guild deemed Carpenter's on-screen accolade as a deliberately provocative violation of their ruling. For a short time, the Guild were threatening to force Columbia to destroy all prints of the film (in exhibition) containing Carpenter's offending dedication to Riesner. Other uncredited writers who worked on the script were Edward Zwick and Diane Thomas.

According to Riesner, producers at Columbia were concerned at the initial box office returns for E.T. the Extra-Terrestrial, because Starman (while Riesner was working its second rewrite) was too similar. Adrian Lyne worked with Douglas on the project, for about a year, before departing to direct Flashdance for Paramount. He was replaced by John Badham, who worked with Douglas for "some months" developing the project; Columbia actually gave them an October 1982 start-date to begin principal photography. In 1985, Badham acknowledged his initial enthusiasm for the script, "I wanted Tom Conti for the lead role [Badham had seen him in London doing Whose Life Is It Anyway?] and he was anxious to do it." But in the summer of 1982, Variety published the first review of E.T., as soon as he read it he realized the two projects were too similar. Douglas immediately ordered script revisions, but Badham eventually moved on to take over directing duties on WarGames. Riesner was charged with keeping Starman essentially the same while making it distinct from E.T., and would work with three subsequent directors: Tony Scott, Peter Hyams, and John Carpenter. Whereas Scott was more interested in style than narrative drive and wanted to cast Philip Anglim, and Hyams pushed for a more conventional science fiction approach, Carpenter, who was eager to shed his image as a maker of exploitative thrillers, wished to emphasize the cross-country rapport that develops between the two leads, Starman and Jenny Hayden, as in The Defiant Ones, The 39 Steps, and It Happened One Night over special effects. Riesner dropped the "heavy political implications" from the script to comply with this.

Parts of the film were shot in Tennessee, Iowa, Arizona, Nevada, and Monument Valley, Utah.

=== Soundtrack ===
Starman: Original Motion Picture Soundtrack

Soundtrack album by Jack Nitzsche
- Released: December 14, 1984
- Genre: Soundtrack
- Length: 33:05
- Label: Varèse Sarabande

Soundtrack
Review scores
Source	Rating
AllMusic	4/5 stars

The soundtrack to Starman was released on December 14, 1984. The album also contains a rendition of "All I Have to Do Is Dream" performed by stars Jeff Bridges and Karen Allen.

All music is composed by Jack Nitzsche (except "All I Have to Do Is Dream," written by Felice and Boudleaux Bryant).

No.	Title	Length
1.	"Jenny Shot"	1:30
2.	"Here Come the Helicopters"	5:04
3.	"Honeymoon"	0:56
4.	"Road Block"	1:38
5.	"Do You Have Somebody?"	1:18
6.	"Pickup Truck"	3:01
7.	"What's It Like up There?"	1:46
8.	"All I Have to Do Is Dream"	3:29
9.	"Lifting Ship"	1:22
10.	"I Gave You a Baby"	2:11
11.	"Morning Military"	1:04
12.	"Define Love"	1:33
13.	"Balls"	1:10
14.	"Starman Leaves"	7:04

== Release ==
=== Theatrical ===
Starman was released first in the United States in 1,261 cinemas on 14 December 1984.

=== Home media ===
The film was released on Blu-ray on August 11, 2009. A collector's edition reissue would later be released on December 18, 2018, by Shout Factory.

== Reception ==
=== Box office ===
Starman grossed nearly $2.9 million in its opening weekend, debuting at number 6. It was released the same week as David Lynch's film Dune and one week after the release of Peter Hyams' film 2010: The Year We Make Contact. The film grossed a total of $28.7 million from its domestic run.

=== Critical response ===
The review aggregator Rotten Tomatoes reports an approval rating of 83% based on 121 reviews. The site's critics consensus reads: "Starman initially begins as an offbeat sci-fi adventure, but transforms into a surprisingly sweet drama, courtesy of Jeff Bridges' disarming performance and John Carpenter's careful direction." The aggregator Metacritic gives the film a score of 71 out of 100, based on seven critics, indicating "generally favorable reviews". Contemporary opinion was generally positive, and tended to focus on the visual effects and Jeff Bridges' acting. Conversations around the film often questioned whether Starman would launch Bridges into an acting superstar. Retrospective reviews have generally remained positive.

==== Contemporary opinion ====
Roger Ebert gave the film three stars out of four and wrote "Starman contains the potential to be a very silly movie, but the two actors have so much sympathy for their characters that the movie, advertised as space fiction, turns into one of 1984's more touching love stories." In a highly positive review for The New York Times, Janet Maslin praised the film along with its actors and director, stating: "If Starman doesn't make a major difference in Jeff Bridges's career, Mr. Bridges is operating in the wrong galaxy." She referred to it as "a science fiction film with sex appeal" and commended the film's romance and humour.

John Nubbin reviewed Starman for Different Worlds magazine and stated that "Filled with routine special effects, Starman is nothing special. It is a filler movie, just taking space on the screen until something else comes along. It is nice to hope that when aliens do land they will be smart and wise and able to heal and distill all the knowledge we need, etc. As a film plot, though, it is already getting a bit tired. It was nice that Jeff Bridges and Karen Allen got some work, but one can only hope the next time we see them that it is in something worthwhile."

==== Retrospective opinion ====
Duane Byrge wrote for The Hollywood Reporter that Starman had "an amusing and appealing storyline" and a "winning performance" by Jeff Bridges, describing it as "an often on-target look at current American culture". However, he found the script lacking in its plot development and characterization of military officials, but praised its "humane message" and Carpenter for "fluid storytelling", commending the score and visual effects. Mark Harrison wrote for Den of Geek that it was "a classic sci-fi date movie" and "not only an outlier in [Carpenter's] body of work but also an inarguable product of his direction". He praised it for a "canny reversal of gender roles" where Bridges' Star Man is shown the world by a cynical Karen Allen. He praised the film's lead performances, believing that Karen Allen's portrayal "might be her best ever performance".

Alan Jones awarded it four stars out of five for Radio Times, referring to the film as a "religious sci-fi parable", praising Bridges' acting and the special effects. He described it as "funny, suspenseful and moving" and concluded that it was one of Carpenter's greatest films. Halliwell's Film Guide was less positive, describing it as a "derivative but eccentric science-fiction fantasy with lapses of narrative and a general attempt to make the love story predominant over the hardware". The review by Time Out called it "a rather lame sci-fi love story", lacking the energy of many of Carpenter's films. The review criticized the film's predictability and Bridges' acting, believing the humor to "wear thin pretty quick". Colin Greenland reviewed Starman for Imagine magazine, and stated that it, "starts well, with engaging performances from Karen Allen [...] and Jeff Bridges", but complains that the second half devolves into an "irritatingly soft-headed love story".

=== Awards and accolades ===
Jeff Bridges was nominated for the Academy Award for Best Actor at the 57th Academy Awards, making Starman the only film by John Carpenter to receive an Academy Award nomination. Bridges was also nominated for the Golden Globe Award for Best Actor – Drama at the 42nd Golden Globe Awards and was awarded the Saturn Award for Best Actor at the 12th Saturn Awards. Karen Allen also received a nomination for the Saturn Award for Best Actress from the Academy of Science Fiction, Fantasy & Horror Films. The film itself was nominated Best Science Fiction Film. Jack Nitzsche received a nomination for the Golden Globe Award for Best Original Score.

The film was nominated for, but does not appear on the following lists:

- 2002: AFI's 100 Years...100 Passions – Nominated
- 2008: AFI's 10 Top 10: Nominated Science Fiction Film

== Legacy ==
=== Remake ===
In April 2016, The Hollywood Reporter reported that Shawn Levy would direct and produce a remake written by Arash Amel. Michael Douglas, who was a producer of the original, was also on board to produce, while Dan Cohen and Robert Mitas were executive producing, and Matt Milam and Adam North were overseeing the project for Columbia. In 2021, Levy declared the remake to be improbable, as he could not find a good draft that was worthy of adaptation.

=== In popular culture ===
The City of Prague Philharmonic Orchestra covered "Starman Leaves (End Title)" for their 2005 cover compilation album, The Science Fiction Album. The 2010 single "Symphonies" by Dan Black from his album UN, and its remix featuring Kid Cudi, sampled CoPPO's cover of the song. At the end of the music video, the lead character is beamed away by a bright circular spaceship, similar to the manner in which the Starman from the film departs Earth. The music video itself contains scenes which pay homage to several Jeff Bridges films, including Tron and King Kong.

In Guardians of the Galaxy Vol. 2, flashbacks revealing the courtship of Peter Quill (Chris Pratt)'s parents Meredith (Laura Haddock) and Ego (Kurt Russell) feature a 1978 Ford Mustang King Cobra.
