= Dhunn =

Indian rock band

- Origin: Bengaluru, India
- Genres: Hindi rock
- Years active: 2007 – present
- Labels: Encore Films
- Members: Ankur Bhasin, Muneer A Mohsin
- Past members: Rahul Gupta

Dhunn is an Indian music band of soft rock – contemporary genre and comprises Ankur Bhasin and Muneer A. Mohsin. Dhunn is known for their original, melodious music and live instrumentation in their music. Being a young and emerging group, Dhunn is a major hit with the late teens and early adults. Dhunn write and compose all their own music.

== Members ==
- Ankur Bhasin
- Muneer A Mohsin

== Early years ==
Ankur and Muneer both studied in Bishop Cotton Boys' School, Bangalore, India. During their schooling days, Ankur started writing poetry and his interest in music led to participation in a literary fest organised by Baldwin Boys' School in 1997. Ankur's group won third prize in the Western Music (Group) category. With an enthused interest, as an aftermath of the unanticipated win in the literary fest, Ankur decided to learn guitar. Ankur met with his school mate Muneer who was also struggling to learn guitar. Together they started learning and teaching guitar to each other.

Being largely self-taught and without the knowledge of written music, the duo created their own format of notations and chords and started creating their own music. However, after the completion of their high school in 2000, Ankur moved to Carnegie Mellon University, US for further studies. Muneer also subsequently moved to Michigan State University, USA for pursuing his college.

In USA, Ankur served as the President of Awaaz (a student organisation for Indian Music at Carnegie Mellon University) during the year 2002–2003 and also formed a fusion band Raag 'n Roll. The band was an instant hit amongst the students, having gathered more than 350 people for its first performance in Pittsburgh, USA. The band was however disbanded the next year with many of its members leaving the university upon completion of their courses at Carnegie Mellon University.

== Music career ==
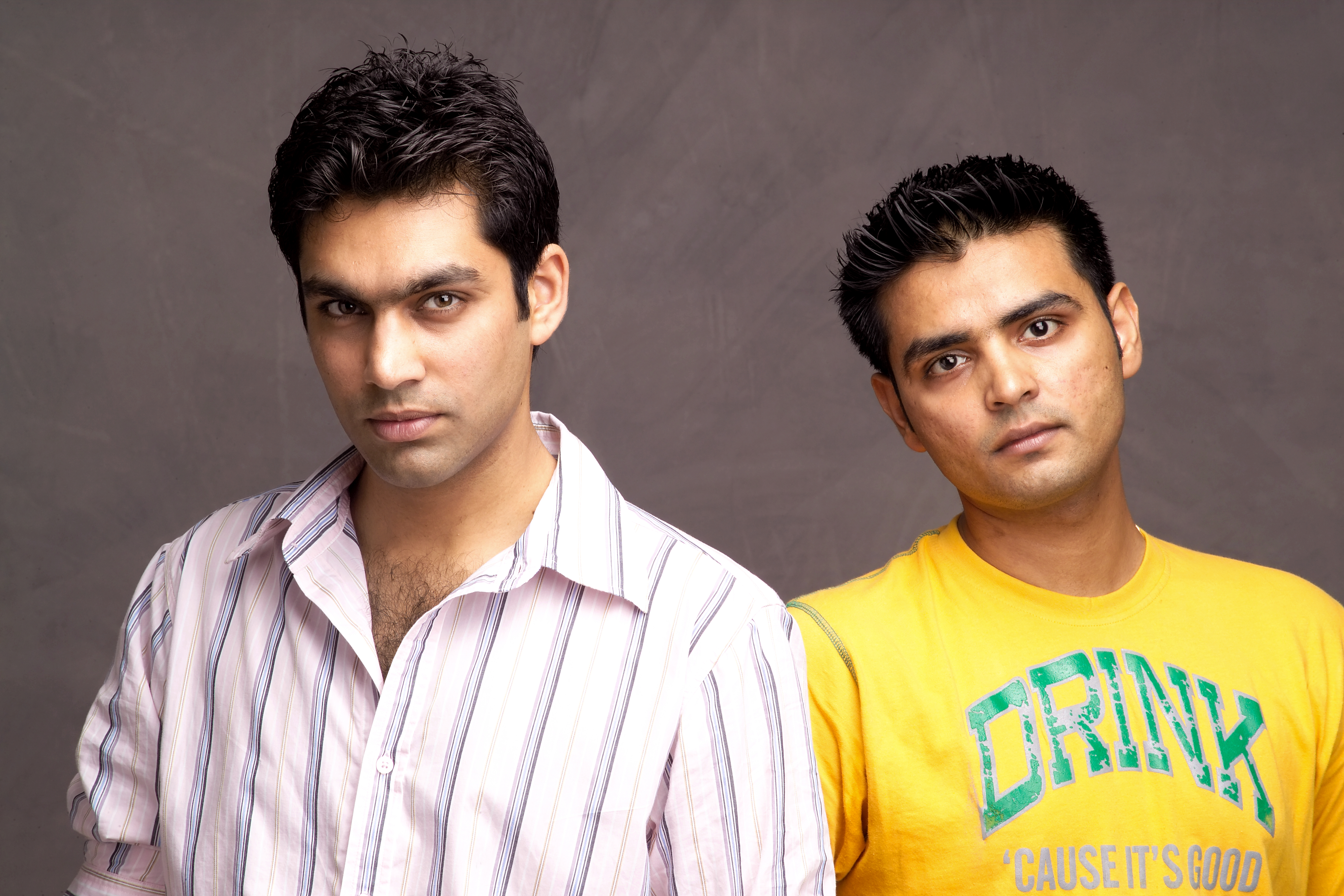
Muneer and Ankur

After the completion of their college in 2004, the duo met up again in Bangalore. Rekindling their interest in music, Ankur and Muneer started creating their own music. Ankur soon met with another friend from school – Rahul Gupta. Due to their shared interest in original music, Ankur invited Rahul to be part of the band (then known as Dreamers). Dreamers changed their name to Vibrants and recorded their debut album at Raveolution Studios, Bangalore.

The band once again changed their name to Dhunn and launched their debut video, Yaadein, at Cinemax, Versova, Mumbai on 11 April 2007. Rahul, however, soon separated from the band thereafter. The label Dhunn signed to was unable to deliver and release the music and Dhunn subsequently cancelled the agreement with the label.

Dhunn released their second video, Tumhari Yaad in 2008 at Lido Mall, Bengaluru.

Dhunn actively performed in Bengaluru, Mumbai and Vietnam for 2 years after which the band went on a hiatus.

On May 10, 2000, Dhunn finally launched their music online through Encore Films.

== Album discography ==
Year of release	Album name	Music Company
2020	Dhunn	Encore Films

== Video Discography ==
Year	Video	Director
2008	Tumhari Yaad	Shekhar Sirin
2007	Yaadein Remix	Mridul Toolsidaas
2007	Yaadein	Mridul Toolsidaas

== Performances ==
Date	Performance
14 November 2008	For Little Paradise at Forum Mall, Bangalore, India
26 October 2008	For Indian Business Chamber at Sheraton, Ho Chi Minh City, Vietnam
18 July 2008	For Rotary Jayanagar, Bangalore, India
15 June 2008	IIM, Bangalore, India
8 June 2008	Little Paradise, Bangalore, India
3 November 2007	For Diwali Mela by Punjabi Welfare Association at Patel's Inn, Bangalore, India
27 October 2007	For Oxfam at LIDO Mall, Bangalore, India
11 April 2007	Club Escape, Mumbai, India
25 February 2007	Gold Coin Club, Bangalore, India
24 February 2007	For Rotary Indranagar on International Night for World Understanding Month at Herbs and Spices, Whitefied, Bangalore, India

== TV appearances ==
Date	Feature
29 October 2007	Dhunn's LIDO show telecasted on TV 9
27 October 2007	Interview on Udaya TV
24 October 2007	E TV
Aug / Sep 2007	Dhunn shoots three episode series with Real Estate TV for the show titled "Space Harmonics"
14 May 2007	MTV Super select (MTV India)

== Radio Appearances ==
Date	Feature
2 March 2008	LIVE show on FM Rainbow from 3pm – 5pm
21 June 2007	LIVE show on Radio City, Bangalore on for World Music Day
16 June 2007	Radio Mirchi, Bangalore from 9pm-midnight on the Club Mirchi
19 May 2007	Radio Mirchi, Mumbai from 9pm to 1am on Club Mirchi with Jeeturaaj
25 June 2006	Radio City Live, Bangalore at 9pm

== Magazine appearances ==
Month	Feature
July 2007	Man's World
June 2007	Featured as Upcoming Artist in RAVE, India
April 2007	Generation Y
2007	Nirvana Woman Fashion Magazine

== Trivia ==
Dhunn's debut video 'Yaadein' is ranked No. 13 in the All Time Non Movie Hits category by Rajshri
