= Best Special Effects =

Best Special Effects usually refers to a specific award category at various awards ceremonies within cinema, TV and music, and may refer to:

- Academy Award for Best Visual Effects, which was called Best Special Effects from 1939 to 1963, and included both visual and sound effects from 1939 to 1962
- BAFTA Award for Best Special Visual Effects, which has been known as that since it was introduced in 1982
- MTV Video Music Award for Best Visual Effects, which was called Best Special Effects in a Video from 1984 to 2011
