= The Servant (album) =

Studio album by The Servant
- Released: 5 April 2004 (UK)
- Genre: Alternative rock, Indie rock, pop rock
- Length: 46:25 (Standard Edition); 62:19 (Limited Edition)
- Label: Prolifica Records
- Producer: Dan Black, Steve Dub (co-producer)

The Servant chronology
With the Invisible (2000)	The Servant (2004)	How to Destroy a Relationship (2006)

The Servant is the debut album of the London-based alternative band The Servant in 2004, released via the Prolifica Recordings. The limited edition contained 15 tracks and totalled an hour in length.

== Critical reception ==
Tom Alford of counterculture praised the album, stating that it "bears the mark of quality" and that the band "suffuse their low-rent tales with superbly constructed musical themes, beautiful harmonies and a sense that they have been doing this far longer than they actually have." David Poulain of Sound of Violence called it "a beautiful pop-rock album in the broad sense."

== Personnel ==
- Dan Black - vocals, laptop, guitar
- Chris Burrows - guitar
- Matt Fisher - bass guitar
- Trevor Sharpe - drums, percussions

== Track listing ==
All tracks are written by Dan Black, except "Devil", which contains an interpolation of "Me and the Devil Blues" by Robert Johnson.

No.	Title	Length
1.	"Cells"	4:47
2.	"Beautiful Thing"	4:00
3.	"Liquefy"	3:41
4.	"Body"	4:42
5.	"Devil"	4:16
6.	"Orchestra"	3:32
7.	"I Can Walk In Your Mind"	3:42
8.	"Not Scared, Terrified"	4:18
9.	"Jesus Says"	4:04
10.	"Get Down"	3:11
11.	"Glowing Logos"	6:12

Limited Edition Bonus Tracks
No.	Title	Length
12.	"Jack The Ripper"	3:41
13.	"Brand New Lover"	4:24
14.	"Papyrus"	5:13
15.	"Oh No, No, Not Another One"	2:36

== Charts ==
Chart (2004–06)	Peak position
French Albums (SNEP)	23
Italian Albums (FIMI)	28
