= Middle man =

Middle man or Middleman or The Middle Men may refer to:

- an intermediary, which may be a third party that offers intermediation services; or in trade, entities or people offering value-added services to a product, such as between a wholesaler and a retailer or a reseller

== Literature ==
- "The Middleman", shorty story by Indian-American writer Bharati Mukherjee
- The Middleman, a comic published by Viper Comics

== Film ==
- Middle Man (1990 film), the fifth installment in the Chinese In the Line of Duty film series
- Middle Men (film), a 2009 American black comedy-drama film
- Middle Man (film), a 2016 American black comedy
- The Middle Man (film), a 2021 multi-national comedy
- The Middleman (film), alternative title for Jana Aranya, a 1976 Indian Bengali-language film

== Television ==
- "The Middle Men", an episode of Torchwood
- "Middle Men", a season 3 episode of The Loud House
- The Middleman (TV series), an ABC Family TV series based on the comic

== Music ==
- Middle Man (album), a 1980 album by Boz Scaggs, or its title track
- Middleman (band), a 4-piece alternative band based in Leeds in West Yorkshire, England
- "Middleman" (song), a 1994 song by Terrorvision

== See also ==
- Man in the middle (disambiguation)
