= Man in the middle =

Man in the middle may refer to:

== Arts and entertainment ==
- Man in the Middle (film), a 1964 movie
- "Man in the Middle" a song from the 1975 album ABBA by ABBA
- "Man in the Middle" a song on the 2001 album This Is Where I Came In by the Bee Gees
- "Man in the Middle" a song by David Bowie recorded with his band Arnold Corns as a B-side to "Hang On to Yourself" in 1972
- Man In The Middle, a memoir of basketballer John Amaechi

== Other uses ==
- Man-in-the-middle attack, a form of cryptographic attack in computer security

== See also ==
- Middle man (disambiguation)
