= The Redland =

American hip hop group

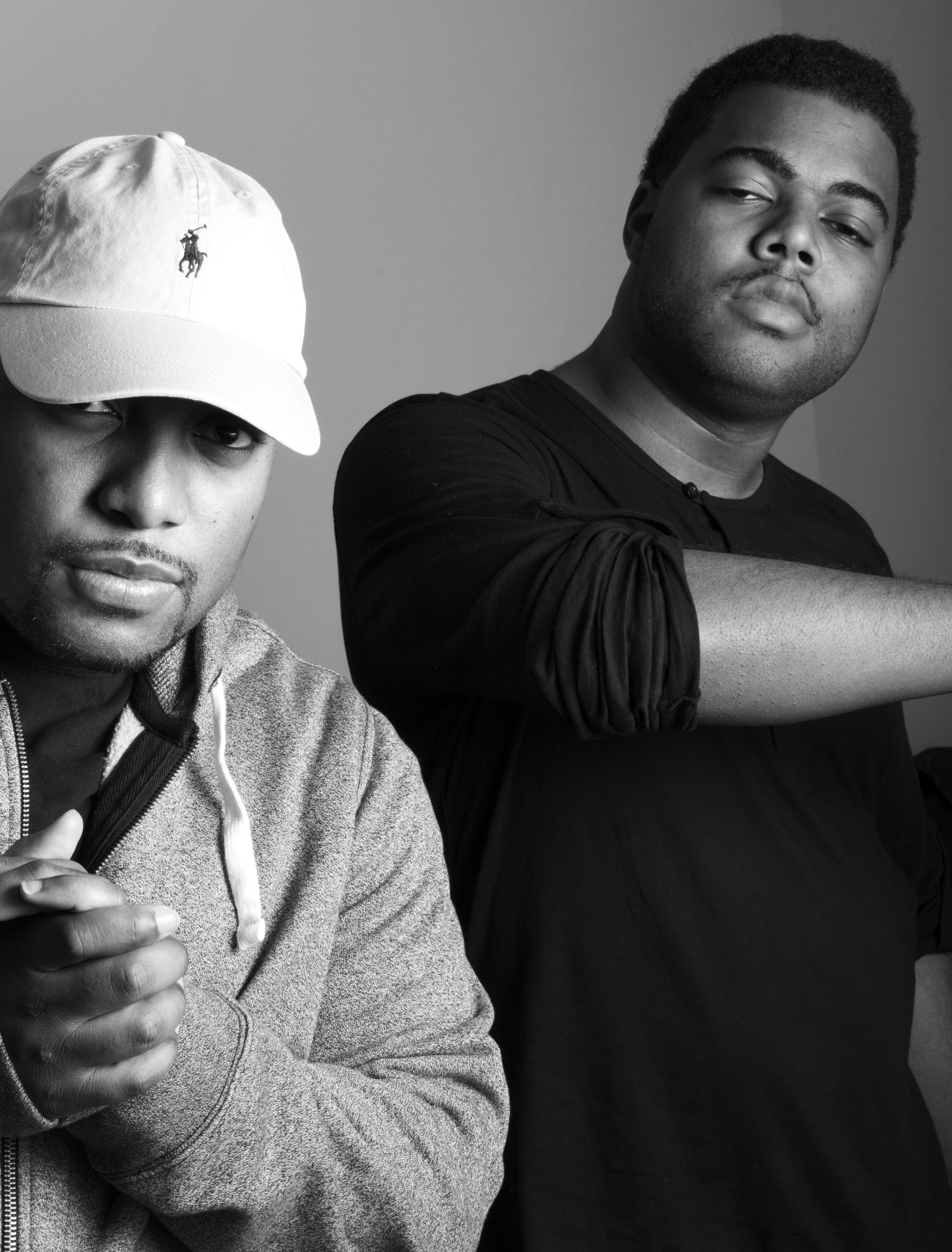
- The Redland, 18 December 2011

Background information
- Origin: Atlanta, Georgia, United States
- Genres: Hip hop, R&B, pop, alternative
- Years active: 2005–present
- Label: The Redland Entertainment
- Members: Earvin Rodney (Earv Legend); Robert Nkosi Evans (Kose)
- Website: web.archive.org/web/20201202221419/http://www.theredlandmusic.com/

The Redland is an American hip hop and R&B duo that originated in Atlanta, Georgia. The group was formed in August 2005, when both its members Earvin Rodney (rhymes, vocals) and Robert Nkosi Evans (vocals) were still attending Morehouse College. Band members state that The Redland title symbolizes The Redlands of Louisiana and Oklahoma, where Earvin Rodney and Robert Nkosi Evans come from respectively. After founding The Redland, Earvin Rodney and Robert Nkosi Evans became better known by their stage names Earv Legend and Kose respectively.

With the debut of their single release, “So Far", featured on the NBA 2K11 soundtrack, NBA 2K11 officially introduced The Redland beyond the Morehouse College campus.

== Beginnings ==
The Redland members both had individual passions for music. However, after meeting at Morehouse College in 2001, they discovered and cultivated their talents together as The Redland. Initially, the band was creating music for fun, but after building on-campus fan base and getting attention, they invested in professional studio equipment and decided to devote themselves to a musical career.

== Career ==
In 2009, The Redland released their debut album EPIC that was made available for purchase on iTunes. The album featured singer Billie Miles. The album cover was shot by photographer and cinematographer Damien Marcano, and a video was shot for the single EPIC. The video aired on Fuse and VH1 Soul.

Following the success of EPIC, The Redland released free mixtape Dontknowwhatitmeans.com (Mixtape) in 2009. Djbooth.net sponsored and introduced the free album's lead single "Don't Know What It Means". Mixtape tracks sample from such classic artists as Nirvana, Tupac, Led Zeppelin, Jay Z, Outkast, Jimi Hendrix, The Killers, Ice Cube, Lil Wayne, and Red Hot Chili Peppers. The mixtape was a Djbooth.net success receiving 4.6 out of 5 stars in member ratings.

In 2011, The Redland released Hip Hop Evolved on iTunes and the video for the album's lead single "Cool Out" appeared on YouTube. Featuring singer Bree D'Val and Grammy winner Bobby Avila as guitarist, the video showed the collaborators' crossing paths in Juarez, Mexico. The strangers go on to ride off together after sharing a cool, tranquil performance. The video was shot in California's Mojave Desert.

The Redland's mixtape The Life. TheParty was released in late 2012 on the band's website. The Life. The Party's most popular song, "Bad Girls" (The Redland's take on Lana Del Rey's hit video "Games"), was featured in BeforetheBig Remix Battle against Kinetics and One Love. The Redland won the competition with 78% of all votes.

An Enlightened Contagion which is The Redland's first full studio album, was released in 2014 on iTunes. Album is written entirely by Earv and Kose, with every track produced by Kose. An Enlightened Contagion draws from the language of The Redland Manifesto, which is full of declarations about their goals and viewpoint. In 2015 The Redland released An Enlightened Contagion Deluxe which includes remixes and is a 16-track collection with messages on empowerment, survival, tolerance, consciousness and social justice.

== Band members ==
- Earvin Rodney (rhymes, vocals), born October 20, 1983, is from New York City and grew up in Baton Rouge, Louisiana.
- Robert Nkosi Evans (vocals), born March 10, 1983, is from Waco, Texas and grew up in Ardmore, Oklahoma.

Earv Legend stamps each song with rap lyrics. Kose serves The Redland not only as a rapper and singer, but he also produces each of their beats.

Kose described his counterpart Earv Legend in an interview for Adam's World: “As an artist Earv Legend provides a vivid view of what he sees around him. He does this without judgment. He can find the poetry in any subject or person. I really don't look at him as just a rapper. To me he is more like an author who has just chosen music as his platform for now." The interview continues with Earv's apt description of Kose: “Kose is that once in a generation musician. He literally, out of everyone, is one of my favorite artists of all time. It's just a matter of time before the world hears what I've heard and comes to the same conclusion.”

== Musical style and influences ==
The Redland has citied Tupac, John Legend, Bob Dylan and Common as their influencers. The band mixes various styles and genres from hip-hop, rap and R&B to pop and alternative to create a different sound.

== Media and appearances ==
The Redland's most widespread success has been its song placement on Visual Concepts and 2K Sport's NBA 2K11 video game. The Redland's song, "So Far", was chosen to be featured on the game that went on to sell over 5.5 million units worldwide. "So Far"'s presence on YouTube encouraged covers, inspired tributes, and even fueled arguments over lyrics and meanings.

Over the years, The Redland has visited many radio stations for on-air interviews, including National Public Radio's Chocolate City; hosted by L.A.'s own Garth Trinidad. The band had video placement on On Demand. The Redland was selected for Virgin American In-Flight Airplay in the “New Music Discovered” category, and also for the Road to the Canadian Music Fest Tour 2010. The Redland's single Epic also made Rap Networks Record Breakers Top 30, marking number 17.

The band has performed across Atlanta at Stankonia, The Sweet Auburn Festival, The Masquerade, East Atlanta Lounge, MJQ's, and Smith's Olde Bar. While in L.A., they performed at The Roxy Theatre. On a trip to London in 2013, The Redland performed at popular night club Jalouse. In 2015 The Redland performed live at Midem, annual live music and networking festival and conference in Cannes, France.

According to The Redland website and social media posts, the band supports social justice and wants to use the power of music to influence issues such as Equality, World Hunger, Youth Development, Education, Voting, Political Activism, Women's Rights, Racial Incarceration Disparity and Gun Violence. The Redland has chosen the tagline "Where Music Meets Social Justice" to communicate their overall philosophy.

== Discography ==
=== Albums ===
List of studio albums with album details
Year	Title	Album details
2009	Epic - EP	Released: April 13, 2009; Label: The Redland Entertainment; Formats: CD, digital download
2011	Hip-Hop Evolved	Released: February 1, 2011; Label:The Redland Entertainment; Formats: CD, digital download
2011	Hip-Hop Evolved (Remixes) - EP	Released: March 15, 2011; Label: The Redland Entertainment; Formats: CD, digital download
2014	An Enlightened Contagion	Released: August 5, 2014; Label: The Redland Entertainment; Formats: CD, digital download
2015	An Enlightened Contagion Deluxe	Released: April 28, 2015; Label: The Redland Entertainment; Formats: CD, digital download

=== Songs ===
Title	Year	Album/Single
So Far	2009	Epic-EP; Hip-Hop Evolved (Remixes)-EP; An Enlightened Contagion; An Enlightened Contagion Deluxe
Epic	2009	Epic-EP
Survive	2014	Single; An Enlightened Contagion; An Enlightened Contagion Deluxe
Inside	2009	Epic-EP
You Say You Love Me	2009	Epic-EP
Cool Out feat Bree D'val	2011	Hip Hop Evolved; Hip-Hop Evolved (Remixes)-EP
Can't Slow Down	2011	Hip Hop Evolved; Hip-Hop Evolved (Remixes)-EP; An Enlightened Contagion; An Enlightened Contagion Deluxe
Cross That Line	2011	Hip Hop Evolved; Hip-Hop Evolved (Remixes)-EP; An Enlightened Contagion; An Enlightened Contagion Deluxe
Tonight	2015	An Enlightened Contagion; An Enlightened Contagion Deluxe
In The Rain	2011	Hip-Hop Evolved (Remixes)-EP; An Enlightened Contagion Deluxe
No Sleep (Remix)	2015	An Enlightened Contagion Deluxe
All The Same	2015	An Enlightened Contagion; An Enlightened Contagion Deluxe
Fancy Words	2011	Hip-Hop Evolved; Hip-Hop Evolved (Remixes)-EP
Fallen	2014	An Enlightened Contagion; An Enlightened Contagion Deluxe
Step Into My Room	2015	An Enlightened Contagion; An Enlightened Contagion Deluxe
Hero	2015	An Enlightened Contagion; An Enlightened Contagion Deluxe
Survive (DJ Panic City Remix)	2015	Single; An Enlightened Contagion Deluxe
No Sleep	2015	An Enlightened Contagion; An Enlightened Contagion Deluxe
On Me	2015	An Enlightened Contagion; An Enlightened Contagion Deluxe
Love Thief (Remix)	2015	An Enlightened Contagion Deluxe
Love Thief	2015	Single, An Enlightened Contagion; An Enlightened Contagion Deluxe

=== Music Videos ===
Title	Year
Epic	2009
Cool Out feat Bree D'val	2011
Survive	2014
Love Thief	2015
