= Moor Music Festival =

Annual event in Yorkshire, England

Coordinates: 53.956451°N 2.056854°W

The Moor Music Festival was an annual music festival held initially on a farm in Addingham Moorside, near the town of Ilkley, West Yorkshire. For the 2009 and 2010 festivals, the setting was moved to Heslaker Farm near to Skipton in North Yorkshire.

The festival had artists playing from the local area and beyond, many being prominent artists in the New Yorkshire music scene. In 2006, bands appearing included The Lodger, Monkey Swallows the Universe, Black Wire, Middleman and iLIKETRAiNS.

2007 saw new additions such as the electronic music tent The Twisted Ballroom hosted by Leeds collective Gonzo and a dub, jungle and dubstep tent called The Trench run by Leeds soundsystem High Pressure.

The event was free from corporate sponsorship and promoted green action and other environmental causes, with stalls at the event on trade justice, climate change, third world development and other social issues.

The 2011 event was relabeled as the Beacons Festival, but was cancelled due to adverse weather on the first day of the event. Thereafter, the event moved away from Skipton and was held on various days across the North of England.
