= MTV Video Music Award for Best Visual Effects =

Annual music video award

- "Hate That I Made You Love Me" by Ariana Grande is the most recent recipient.
- Awarded for: Visual effects
- Country: United States
- Presented by: MTV
- First award: 1984
- Currently held by: Hadi Dahrouge and Jehan Bouazza – "Hate That I Made You Love Me" by Ariana Grande (2026)

Highlights
- Most wins: Peter Gabriel (3); GloriaFX, Jim Blashfield, Loris Paillier, Mathematic, Sean Broughton & Vania Heymann (2)
- Most nominations: Missy Elliott (6); Mathematic (9)
- Website: VMA website

The MTV Video Music Award for Best Visual Effects is a craft award given to the artist, the artist's manager, and the visual effects artists and/or visual effects company of the music video. From 1984 to 2006, the award's full name was Best Special Effects in a Video, and after a brief removal in 2007, its name was shortened to Best Special Effects between 2008 and 2011. In 2012, the category acquired its current name.

The biggest winners are director Jim Blashfield, special effects artist Sean Broughton, executive producer Loris Paillier and production company GloriaFX, with two wins each. In terms of nominations, visual effects company Mathematic is the biggest nominee in the category's history (seven nominations). Closely following are GloriaFX and Ingenuity Studios (formerly Ingenuity Engine), each receiving a total of six nominations. Special effects supervisors David Yardley and Fred Raimondi, as well as the companies Pixel Envy (headed by the Brothers Strause) and BUF come in third place, with four nominations apiece.

The performer whose videos have won the most awards is Peter Gabriel, garnering three Moonmen. Meanwhile, Missy Elliott's videos have received the most nominations with six.

No performer has won a Moonman in this category for working on their video's effects. However, David Byrne from Talking Heads ("Burning Down the House") and Adam Jones from Tool ("Prison Sex") have been nominated for doing such work.

== Recipients ==
=== 1980s ===
Year	Winner(s)	Work	Nominees	Ref.
1984	Godley & Creme	"Rockit" (performed by Herbie Hancock)	"Burning Down the House" – David Byrne and Julia Hayward (performed by Talking Heads); "Dancing with Myself" – Eric Critchley (performed by Billy Idol); "Hyperactive!" – David Yardley (performed by Thomas Dolby); "You Might Think" – Charlex (performed by The Cars)	
1985	Tony Mitchell, Kathy Dougherty and Peter Cohen	"Don't Come Around Here No More" (performed by Tom Petty and the Heartbreakers)	"Go Insane" – David Yardley (performed by Lindsey Buckingham); "It's a Miracle" – David Yardley (performed by Culture Club); "Run to You" – Cinebuild (performed by Bryan Adams); "Slow Dancing" – David Yardley (performed by Lindsey Buckingham)	
1986	Michael Patterson and Candace Reckinger	"Take On Me" (performed by a-ha)	"Burning House of Love" – Daniel Kleinman (performed by X); "Money for Nothing" – Ian Pearson (performed by Dire Straits); "Rough Boy" – Max Anderson and Chris Nibley (performed by ZZ Top); "Sex as a Weapon" – Daniel Kleinman and Richard Uber (performed by Pat Benatar)	
1987	Peter Lord	"Sledgehammer" (performed by Peter Gabriel)	"Big Time" – Peter Wallach (performed by Peter Gabriel); "The Boy in the Bubble" – Jim Blashfield (performed by Paul Simon); "Land of Confusion" – Jim Yukich and John Lloyd (performed by Genesis); "Missionary Man" – Willy Smax (performed by Eurythmics)	
1988	Jim Francis and Dave Barton	"Hourglass" (performed by Squeeze)	"Got My Mind Set on You" – John McCallum (performed by George Harrison); "Need You Tonight/Mediate" – Lynn Maree Milburn (performed by INXS); "Touch of Grey" – Gary Gutierrez (performed by Grateful Dead); "When We Was Fab" – Chris Lyons (performed by George Harrison)	
1989	Jim Blashfield	"Leave Me Alone" (performed by Michael Jackson)	"I Wish U Heaven" – Maury Rosenfeld and Fred Raimondi (performed by Prince); "Oh Daddy" – Joey Ahlbum (performed by Adrian Belew); "Wild, Wild West" – Nicholas Brandt and Bridget Blake-Wilson (performed by The Escape Club)	

=== 1990s ===
Year	Winner(s)	Work	Nominees	Ref.
1990	Jim Blashfield	"Sowing the Seeds of Love" (performed by Tears for Fears)	"Cradle of Love" – Peter Moyer (performed by Billy Idol); "Opposites Attract" – Michael Patterson (performed by Paula Abdul); "We Didn't Start the Fire" – Chris Blum (performed by Billy Joel)	
1991	David Faithfull and Ralph Ziman	"Falling to Pieces" (performed by Faith No More)	"Crazy" – Big TV! (performed by Seal); "Do the Bartman" – Brad Bird (performed by Bart Simpson); "Here Comes the Hammer" – Fred Raimondi and Maury Rosenfeld (performed by MC Hammer); "I've Got You Under My Skin" – Pitov (performed by Neneh Cherry); "When It Began" – Carl Bressler and Paul Rachman (performed by The Replacements)	
1992	Simon Taylor	"Even Better Than the Real Thing" (performed by U2)	"Black or White (Short Version)" – Jamie Dixon (performed by Michael Jackson); "Let's Get Rocked" – Ian Pearson (performed by Def Leppard); "She's Mad" – Carlos Arguello and Michele Ferrone (performed by David Byrne)	
1993	Real World Productions and Colossal Pictures	"Steam" (performed by Peter Gabriel)	"Livin' on the Edge" – Cream Cheese Productions (performed by Aerosmith); "She Kissed Me" – Michel Gondry (performed by Terence Trent D'Arby); "Shock to the System" – Stan Winston (performed by Billy Idol)	
1994	Brett Leonard and Angel Studios	"Kiss That Frog" (performed by Peter Gabriel)	"Amazing" – Cream Cheese Films and Video Image (performed by Aerosmith); "Human Behaviour" – Michel Gondry (performed by Björk); "Prison Sex" – Adam Jones (performed by Tool)	
1995	Fred Raimondi	"Love Is Strong" (performed by The Rolling Stones)	"Army of Me" – BUF (performed by Björk); "Scream" – Kevin Tod Haug, Alexander Frisch, Ashley Clemens, Richard 'Dr.' Baily, Jay Johnson and P. Scott Makela (performed by Michael Jackson and Janet Jackson); "Waterfalls" – Peter Conn and Chris Mitchell (performed by TLC)	
1996	Chris Staves	"Tonight, Tonight" (performed by The Smashing Pumpkins)	"Free as a Bird" – Johnny Senered, Kristen Johnson and Ben Gibbs (performed by The Beatles); "Tha Crossroads" – Cameron Noble (performed by Bone Thugs-n-Harmony); "Walking Contradiction" – Jefferson Wagner and Brian Boles (performed by Green Day)	
1997	Jonathan Glazer and Sean Broughton	"Virtual Insanity" (performed by Jamiroquai)	"The Beautiful People" – D.A.V.E. and Panic & Bob (performed by Marilyn Manson); "The End Is the Beginning Is the End" – Chris Staves, Nigel Randall, Edson Williams and the Brothers Strause (performed by The Smashing Pumpkins); "Men in Black" – Paul Griffin, Alan Rosenfield and Wade Howie (performed by Will Smith); "Novocaine for the Soul" – Ashley Clemens (performed by Eels)	
1998	Steve Murgatroyd, Dan Williams, Steve Hiam and Anthony Walsham	"Frozen" (performed by Madonna)	"Come to Daddy" – Chris Cunningham, Glassworks, Red and Creature FX (performed by Aphex Twin); "Everlong" – Paul Sokol and Chris W. (performed by Foo Fighters); "Pink" – Kevin Yagher (performed by Aerosmith); "Push It" – Sebasten Caudron (performed by Garbage)	
1999	Sean Broughton, Stuart D. Gordon and Paul Simpson of Digital Domain	"Special" (performed by Garbage)	"Freak on a Leash" – Matt Beck, Edson Williams and the Brothers Strause (performed by Korn); "Joints & Jam" – Brian Beletic and Todd Somodivilla (performed by The Black Eyed Peas); "Miami" – Eric Swenson, Andrea Mansour and Simon Mowbray (performed by Will Smith); "Nothing Really Matters" – Johan Renck, Bjorn Benckert and Tor-Bjorn Olsson (performed by Madonna); "What's It Gonna Be?!" – Fred Raimondi (performed by Busta Rhymes featuring Janet Jackson)	

=== 2000s ===
Year	Winner(s)	Work	Nominees	Ref.
2000	Glassworks	"All Is Full of Love" (performed by Björk)	"Californication" – Pixel Envy (performed by Red Hot Chili Peppers); "Everything is Everything" – Method Studios (performed by Lauryn Hill); "I Disappear" – Asylum Visual Effects (performed by Metallica); "Pumping on Your Stereo" – Jim Henson's Creature Shop (performed by Supergrass)	
2001	Carter White FX, Audio Motion and Clear Post Production	"Rock DJ" (performed by Robbie Williams)	"Elevation (Tomb Raider Mix)" – Pixel Envy and Chris Watts (performed by U2); "Get Ur Freak On" – Glenn Bennett (performed by Missy Elliott); "Weapon of Choice" – Ben Gibbs (performed by Fatboy Slim)	
2002	Sebastian Fau and Twisted Labs	"Fell in Love with a Girl" (performed by The White Stripes)	"Alive" – Pixel Envy (performed by P.O.D.); "Black Suits Comin' (Nod Ya Head)" – Pixel Envy (performed by Will Smith); "One Minute Man" – Nathan McGuinness and Marc Varisco (performed by Missy Elliott featuring Ludacris and Trina)	
2003	Nigel Sarrag	"Go with the Flow" (performed by Queens of the Stone Age)	"Floetic" – Base 2 Studios (performed by Floetry); "Seven Nation Army" – BUF (performed by The White Stripes); "There There" – John Williams and Dave Lea (performed by Radiohead); "Work It" – Realm Productions (performed by Missy Elliott)	
2004	Elad Offer, Chris Eckardt and Money Shots	"Hey Ya!" (performed by OutKast)	"Float On" – Christopher Mills and Revolver Film Company (performed by Modest Mouse); "The Hardest Button to Button" – Richard de Carteret, Angus Kneale and Dirk Greene (performed by The White Stripes); "Megalomaniac" – Jake Banks, Matt Marquis and Stardust Studios (performed by Incubus); "Walkie Talkie Man" – Angus Kneale, Jamie Scott and The Mill (performed by Steriogram)	
2005	Passion Pictures	"Feel Good Inc." (performed by Gorillaz)	"Lose Control" – Radium (performed by Missy Elliott featuring Ciara and Fatman Scoop); "Number One Spot" – 20Twenty (performed by Ludacris); "Speed of Sound" – A52 (performed by Coldplay); "Vertigo" – Jam Abelenet (performed by U2); "The Widow" – Artificial Army (performed by The Mars Volta)	
2006	Louis Mackall and Tonia Wallander	"We Run This" (performed by Missy Elliott)	"The Adventure" – Jack Effects (performed by Angels & Airwaves); "Hell Yes" – Hammer & Tongs (performed by Beck); "Life Wasted" – Fernando Apodaca (performed by Pearl Jam); "Original of the Species" – John Leamy and Lawrence Nimrichter (performed by U2)	
2007	—N/a			
2008	SoMe and Jonas & François	"Good Life" (performed by Kanye West featuring T-Pain)	"Bleed It Out" – David Lebensfeld and Adam Catino (performed by Linkin Park); "Ching-a-Ling" / "Shake Your Pom Pom" – Les Umberger (performed by Missy Elliott); "Honey" – X1 FX (performed by Erykah Badu); "Violet Hill" – Asa Mader (performed by Coldplay)	
2009	Chimney Pot	"Paparazzi" (performed by Lady Gaga)	"Paranoid" – Wizardflex and Ghost Town Media (performed by Kanye West featuring Mr Hudson); "Single Ladies (Put a Ring on It)" – VFX Effects and Louis Mackall V (performed by Beyoncé); "We Made You" – Ingenuity Engine (performed by Eminem); "Who's Gonna Save My Soul" – Gradient Effects and Image Metrics (performed by Gnarls Barkley)	

=== 2010s ===
Year	Winner(s)	Work	Nominees	Ref.
2010	Humble and Sam Stephens	"Uprising" (performed by Muse)	"21st Century Breakdown" – Laundry (performed by Green Day); "Bad Romance" – Skulley Effects VFX (performed by Lady Gaga); "Not Afraid" – Animaholics-VFX (performed by Eminem); "Symphonies" – Corinne Bance and Axel D'Harcourt (performed by Dan Black)	
2011	Jeff Dotson for Dot & Effects	"E.T." (performed by Katy Perry featuring Kanye West)	"Don't Turn the Lights On" – The Mill (performed by Chromeo); "Power" – Nice Shoes and ArtJail (performed by Kanye West featuring Dwele); "Simple Math" – DANIELS (performed by Manchester Orchestra); "Waiting for the End" – Ghost Town Media (performed by Linkin Park)	
2012	Deka Brothers and Tony "Truand" Datis	"First of the Year (Equinox)" (performed by Skrillex)	"Burn It Down" – Ghost Town Media (performed by Linkin Park); "Turn Me On" – Alex Frisch, Joe Harkins, Scott Metzger and Vico Sharabani (performed by David Guetta featuring Nicki Minaj); "Where Have You Been" – BAKED FX (performed by Rihanna); "Wide Awake" – Ingenuity Engine (performed by Katy Perry)	
2013	Grady Hall, Jonathan Wu and Derek Johnson	"Safe and Sound" (performed by Capital Cities)	"Breakn' a Sweat" – RADICAL FRIEND (performed by Skrillex featuring The Doors)); "It's You" – Royal Post / Paris (performed by Duck Sauce); "Tiny Tortures" – Dustin Bowser (performed by Flying Lotus); "Wicked Games" – Drop and Abel (performed by The Weeknd)	
2014	1stAveMachine	"The Writing's on the Wall" (performed by OK Go)	"Grab Her!" – Mathematic and Emile Sornin (performed by Disclosure); "Lazaretto" – Mathematic and Jonas & François (performed by Jack White); "Rap God" – Rich Lee, Louis Baker, Mammal Studios, Laundry! and Sunset Edit (performed by Eminem); "Turn Down for What" – DANIELS and Zak Stoltz (performed by DJ Snake and Lil Jon)	
2015	Brewer, GloriaFX, Tomash Kuzmytskyi and Max Chyzhevskyy	"Where Are U Now" (performed by Skrillex and Diplo featuring Justin Bieber)	"Bad Blood" – Ingenuity Studios (performed by Taylor Swift featuring Kendrick Lamar); "Fucking Young/Death Camp" – GloriaFX (performed by Tyler, The Creator); "Telegraph Ave." – GloriaFX (performed by Childish Gambino); "Two Weeks" – GloriaFX, Tomash Kuzmytskyi and Max Chyzhevskyy (performed by FKA Twigs)	
2016	Vania Heymann and GloriaFX	"Up&Up" (performed by Coldplay)	"Can't Feel My Face" – Louis Mackall and T.J. Burke (performed by The Weeknd); M3LL155X – Lewis Saunders and Jihoon Yoo (performed by FKA twigs); "Pillowtalk" – David Smith (performed by Zayn); "Send My Love (To Your New Lover)" – Jonathan Box and MPC (performed by Adele)	
2017	Jonah Hall of Timber	"HUMBLE." (performed by Kendrick Lamar)	"Chained to the Rhythm" – MIRADA (performed by Katy Perry featuring Skip Marley); "Dis Generation" – Brandon Hirzel of Bemo (performed by A Tribe Called Quest); "iSpy" – Max Colt and Tomash Kuzmytskyi of GloriaFX (performed by Kyle featuring Lil Yachty); "Sign of the Times" – Cédric Nivoliez of ONE MORE (performed by Harry Styles)	
2018	Loris Paillier at BUF Paris	"All the Stars" (performed by Kendrick Lamar and SZA)	"Lonely Together" – KPP (performed by Avicii featuring Rita Ora); "Look What You Made Me Do" – Ingenuity Studios (performed by Taylor Swift); "No Tears Left to Cry" – Dominique Vidal and Loris Paillier at BUF Paris (performed by Ariana Grande); "Wait" – Timber (performed by Maroon 5); "Walk on Water" – Rich Lee for Drive Studios (performed by Eminem featuring Beyoncé)	
2019	Loris Paillier and Lucas Salton for BUF VFX	"Me!" (performed by Taylor Swift featuring Brendon Urie of Panic! at the Disco)	GloriaFX, Sergii Mashevskyi and Anatolii Kuzmytskyi – "Just Us" (performed by DJ Khaled featuring SZA); Bryan Fugal of Centralfugal Productions, Ryan Ross and Andres Jaramillo – "When the Party's Over" (performed by Billie Eilish); Analog – "Cellophane" (performed by FKA Twigs); Fabrice Lagayette at Mathematic – "God Is a Woman" (performed by Ariana Grande); Ethan Chancer – "No New Friends" (performed by LSD)	

=== 2020s ===
Year	Winner(s)	Work	Nominees	Ref.
2020	EIGHTY4 and Mathematic	"Physical" (performed by Dua Lipa)	"Adore You" – Mathematic (performed by Harry Styles); "All the Good Girls Go to Hell" – Drive Studios (performed by Billie Eilish); "Highest in the Room" – Ingenuity Studios (performed by Travis Scott); "I Love Me" – Hoody FX (performed by Demi Lovato); "Rain on Me" – Ingenuity Studios (performed by Lady Gaga with Ariana Grande)	
2021	Mathematic	"Montero (Call Me by Your Name)" (performed by Lil Nas X)	"All I Know So Far" – Dominique Vidal, Geoffrey Niquet, Annabelle Zoellin and Camille Gibrat (performed by Pink); "Build a Bitch" – Andrew Donoho, Denhov Visuals, Denis Strahhov, Rein Jakobson, Vahur Kuusk, Tatjana Pavlik and Yekaterina Vetrova (performed by Bella Poarch); "Higher Power" – Mathematic (performed by Coldplay); "Tangerine" – YSF Studio Paris (performed by Glass Animals); "You Right" – La Pac, Anthony Lestremau, Julien Missaire, Petr Shkolniy, Alexi Bailla, Micha Sher, Antoine Hache, Mikros MPC, Nicolas Huget, Guillaume Ho Tsong Fang, Benjamin Lenfant, Stephane Pivron, MPC Bangalore, Chanakya Chander, Raju Ganesh and David Rouxel (performed by Doja Cat and The Weeknd)	
2022	Cameo FX	"Industry Baby" (performed by Lil Nas X and Jack Harlow)	"Happier Than Ever" – Ingenuity Studios (performed by Billie Eilish); "The Heart Part 5" – Deep Voodoo (performed by Kendrick Lamar); "My Universe" – AMGI, BUF, Ingenuity, Rodeo FX, and Territory Studio (performed by Coldplay and BTS); "Stay" – Digital Axis (performed by The Kid Laroi and Justin Bieber); "Sweetest Pie" – Mário Dubec at UPP (performed by Megan Thee Stallion and Dua Lipa)	
2023	Parliament	"Anti-Hero" (performed by Taylor Swift)	"Love from the Other Side" – Thomas Bailey and Josh Shaffner (performed by Fall Out Boy); "Music for a Sushi Restaurant" – Chelsea Delfino and Black Kite Studios (performed by Harry Styles); "Super Freaky Girl" – Cameo FX (performed by Nicki Minaj); "Unholy" – Max Colt and FRENDER (performed by Sam Smith and Kim Petras); "Void" – Carbon (performed by Melanie Martinez)	
2024	Synapse Virtual Production, Louise Lee, Rich Lee, Metaphysic and Flawless Post	"Houdini" (performed by Eminem)	"Boa" – Mathematic (performed by Megan Thee Stallion); "The Boy Is Mine" – Digital Axis (performed by Ariana Grande); "Get Him Back!" – Uppercut, John Geehreng, Steve Cokonis, Mitch Gardiner, Chelsea Pistono, John Ashby, Alice Cen, Ernie Armitage, Georgina Poushkine, Cooper Vacheron, Preston Mohr, Karen Arakelian and Justin Johnson (performed by Olivia Rodrigo); "Selfish" – Max Colt and FRENDER (performed by Justin Timberlake)	
2025	Vania Heymann and Tal Baltuch	"Manchild" (performed by Sabrina Carpenter)	"Abracadabra" – Yeap Crew, Yura Karikh and Igor Eyth (performed by Lady Gaga); "APT." – Maksymilian Rafal Ojster (performed by Rosé and Bruno Mars); Brighter Days Ahead – Mathematic (performed by Ariana Grande); Hurry Up Tomorrow – Zeke Faust (performed by The Weeknd); "Just Keep Watching" – Daniel Saldivar and White Rhino VFX (performed by Tate McRae)	
2026	Mathematic Studio, Hadi Dahrouge and Jehan Bouazza	"Hate That I Made You Love Me" (performed by Ariana Grande)	"Eyes Closed" – Serhii Solodkyi (performed by Jisoo and Zayn); Confessions II – The Film – Monumental (performed by Madonna); "Stateside + Zara Larsson" – Copenhagen VFX (performed by PinkPantheress and Zara Larsson); "Click Clack Symphony" – Frame23 Studio (performed by Raye featuring Hans Zimmer); "The Fate of Ophelia" – Parliament (performed by Taylor Swift)	

== Visual Effects Statistics ==
=== Multiple wins ===
2 wins

- GloriaFX
- Jim Blashfield
- Loris Paillier
- Mathematic
- Sean Broughton
- Vania Heymann

=== Multiple nominations ===
9 nominations

- Mathematic

8 nominations

- Ingenuity Studios (Note: formerly known as Ingenuity Engine)

7 nominations

- GloriaFX

5 nominations

- Max Colt (Note: A.K.A. Max Chyzhevskyy)

4 nominations

- BUF
- David Yardley
- Fred Raimondi
- Pixel Envy

3 nominations

- Ghost Town Media
- Jim Blashfield
- Loris Paillier
- Louis Mackall
- Rich Lee
- Tomash Kuzmytskyi

2 nominations

- Alexander Frisch (Note: A.K.A. Alex Frisch)
- Angus Kneale
- Ashley Clemens
- BEMO
- Ben Gibbs
- Brothers Strause
- BUF Paris
- Cameo FX
- Chris Staves
- Chris Watts (Note: A.K.A. Chris W.)
- Cream Cheese Productions (Note: A.K.A. Cream Cheese Films and Video Image)
- Daniel Kleinman
- DANIELS
- Digital Axis
- Drive Studios
- Edson Williams
- FRENDER
- Glassworks
- Ian Pearson
- Jeff Dotson
- Jonas & François
- Laundry
- Maury Rosenfeld
- Michael Patterson
- Michel Gondry
- Parliament
- Sean Broughton
- The Mill
- Timber
- Vania Heymann

== Artist Statistics ==
=== Multiple wins ===
3 wins

- Peter Gabriel

2 wins

- Kanye West (Note: 1 as a featured artist.)
- Kendrick Lamar
- Lil Nas X
- Skrillex
- Taylor Swift

=== Multiple nominations ===
6 nominations

- Missy Elliott

5 nominations

- Ariana Grande
- Coldplay
- Eminem
- Taylor Swift

4 nominations

- Kanye West (Note: 1 as a featured artist.)
- Kendrick Lamar (Note: 1 as a featured artist.)
- Lady Gaga
- Peter Gabriel
- U2
- The Weeknd

3 nominations

- Aerosmith
- Billie Eilish
- Billy Idol
- Björk
- FKA Twigs
- Harry Styles
- Katy Perry
- Linkin Park
- Michael Jackson
- Skrillex
- The White Stripes
- Will Smith

2 nominations

- Beyoncé (Note: 1 as a featured artist.)
- Dua Lipa
- Garbage
- George Harrison
- Green Day
- Janet Jackson (Note: 1 as a featured artist.)
- Justin Bieber (Note: 1 as a featured artist.)
- Lil Nas X
- Lindsey Buckingham
- Ludacris (Note: 1 as a featured artist.)
- Madonna
- Megan Thee Stallion
- Nicki Minaj (Note: 1 as a featured artist.)
- The Smashing Pumpkins
- SZA (Note: 1 as a featured artist.)
