= Tighten Up (The Black Keys song) =

Single by the Black Keys

from the album Brothers
- B-side: "Howlin' for You"
- Released: April 23, 2010
- Studio: The Bunker (Brooklyn, New York)
- Genre: Alternative rock; blues rock; garage rock
- Length: 3:34
- Label: Nonesuch
- Songwriters: Dan Auerbach; Patrick Carney
- Producer: Danger Mouse

The Black Keys singles chronology
"Same Old Thing" (2008)	"Tighten Up" (2010)	"Next Girl" (2010)

Professional ratings
Review scores
Source	Rating
Rolling Stone	4/5 stars

"Tighten Up" is a song by American rock band the Black Keys. It is the third track on their 2010 album Brothers and was released as the record's first single on April 23, 2010.

The song has become one of the most successful Black Keys singles in the United States, being their first song to chart on the Billboard Hot 100 and reaching number one on the Alternative Songs and Rock Songs charts. At the 53rd Grammy Awards in 2011, the song won Best Rock Performance by a Duo or Group with Vocal (the last song to receive the award), while also receiving a nomination for Best Rock Song. Musically, the song is in the key of F-sharp minor.

== Music video ==
The original music video for the song was a low-budget clip starring a puppet dinosaur named Frank who is standing beside a plant. The video shows him dancing and miming the words a little, whilst subtitles go on saying different facts about the video, the band, and Frank; e.g. "Frank has a profile on eHarmony..." "He is a puppet, not a real dinosaur." This goes along the same direction of using sort of "obvious" or "simple" ways to say things like the album cover does; e.g. "This is a song by the Black Keys", "It's from an album called Brothers", etc. The video was made by director Chris Marrs Piliero as the label asked them to do a placeholder video for "Tighten Up" as a teaser for Brothers. Piliero was inspired by both "stupid kid shit that could still be for adults, like Yo Gabba Gabba! and "all these weird and sometimes creepy old-school puppet stuff from the 50s, 60s, 70s.", considering at first an ALF doll before settling on the dinosaur. He later made a similar teaser video for "Next Girl", where Frank interacts with bikini-clad models.

The official music video, also directed by Piliero, was released on May 18, 2010. It shows Auerbach and his fictional son walking to the park. Auerbach sits next to Carney on a bench while their fictional sons play with toy trucks. Auerbach's son looks up on the playground to see a little girl, after which he starts to lip sync to the song. He climbs up on the playground and goes in to kiss her but then he opens his eyes to realize Carney's son has lured her away. After he attempts to kiss her, the two boys begin to fight. After Auerbach and Carney attempt in vain to break up the fight, they see the mother of the girl, played by Spanish actress Carlotta Elektra Bosch, and begin to fight like their sons. They hit each other using mostly Carney's drum kit and after the woman sees them fighting, she walks away in disgust. Their boys come to them and shake their heads at them with disappointment.

The official music video won the 2010 MTV Video Music Award for Breakthrough Video, and it appears on Pitchfork's top music videos of 2010.

== Reception ==
"Tighten Up" is widely considered to be one of the Black Keys' greatest songs. In 2012, Complex ranked the song number one on their list of the 15 greatest Black Keys songs, and in 2019, Paste ranked the song number three on their list of the 10 greatest Black Keys songs. In 2011, Rolling Stone put the song on its list of the 15 Best Whistling Songs of All Time.

== Track listing ==
All songs were written by the Black Keys.

1. "Tighten Up" – 3:30
2. "Howlin' for You" – 3:11

== Personnel ==
The Black Keys

- Dan Auerbach – guitars, vocals, keyboards, production on "Howlin' for You"
- Patrick Carney – drums, percussion, production on "Howlin' for You"

Additional musicians

- Nicole Wray – backing vocals on "Howlin' for You"

Technical personnel

- Tchad Blake – mixing
- Danger Mouse at The Bunker, Brooklyn, NY – production
- Brian Lucey at Magic Garden Mastering – mastering
- Mark Neil at Muscle Shoals Sound Studio – engineering and production on "Howlin' for You"
- Kennie Takahashi – engineering on "Tighten Up"

== Chart performance ==
On the week ending November 6, 2010, "Tighten Up" debuted at number 93 on the Billboard Hot 100. It re-entered at number 87 on the week ending January 22, 2011. The single also achieved early success on rock radio, hitting number one on both the Alternative Songs chart (for 10 weeks) and the Rock Songs chart (for 12 weeks).

=== Weekly charts ===
Chart (2010–11)	Peak position
Belgium (Ultratip Bubbling Under Flanders)	17
Canada Hot 100 (Billboard)	57
Canada Rock (Billboard)	2
Denmark Airplay (Tracklisten)	4
US Billboard Hot 100	87
US Adult Alternative Airplay (Billboard)	12
US Alternative Airplay (Billboard)	1
US Rock Songs (Billboard)	1

=== Year-end charts ===
Chart (2010)	Position
US Hot Rock Songs (Billboard)	28
Chart (2011)	Position
US Hot Rock Songs (Billboard)	8

=== Decade-end charts ===
Chart (2010–2019)	Position
US Hot Rock Songs (Billboard)	18

== Certifications ==
Region	Certification	Certified units/sales
Canada (Music Canada)	3× Platinum	240,000^{‡}
New Zealand (RMNZ)	Gold	15,000^{‡}
United Kingdom (BPI)	Silver	200,000^{‡}
United States (RIAA)	Platinum	1,000,000^{‡}
^{*} Sales figures based on certification alone.^{‡} Sales+streaming figures based on certification alone.

== Usage in media ==
"Tighten Up" has been licensed to appear in EA Sports game FIFA 11, the musical video games Rocksmith, Rock Band 3 (as downloadable content for both) and Guitar Hero Live, the TV series Gossip Girl, a Subaru commercial, a Molson commercial, and the films I Am Number Four, Bad Teacher, and Spring Breakers.

In 2015, a cover by Justin Young was used in the sci-fi TV series The Expanse, in the first episode of season 1, "Dulcinea". The lyrics of the song were translated to the Belter Creole, a constructed language made for the TV series by Nick Farmer, that was spoken in the show by Belters, the inhabitants of the asteroid belt and outer planets. The full version of the song was later song was placed on the TV series The Collector's Edition version of the soundtrack, that was realized on December 13, 2019.

== See also ==
- List of Billboard Alternative Songs number ones of the 2010s
