= How to Destroy a Relationship =

Studio album by The Servant
- Released: 2 October 2006
- Genres: Alternative rock, indie rock, indie pop
- Producer: Jim Lowe

The Servant chronology
The Servant (2004)	How to Destroy a Relationship (2006)

How to Destroy a Relationship is the second album released by London rock group The Servant. It was released in Italy, France, and Switzerland on October 2, 2006.

The producer was Jim Lowe, who produced albums by Stereophonics and The Charlatans.

== Track listing ==
1. "How to Destroy a Relationship" - 3:34
2. "Sleep Deprivation" - 3:43
3. "Hey Lou Reed" - 4:10
4. "Save Me Now" - 3:57
5. "Moonbeams" - 3:41
6. "Brains" - 4:32
7. "Hey Do You Feel Good?" - 4:47
8. "(I Should Be Your) Girlfriend" - 3:50
9. "I Wish I Could Stop Wishing for Things" - 3:19
10. "On Your Knees Kid" - 4:23
11. "Out of Phase" - 3:26

== Singles ==
- "How To Destroy a Relationship" (2006)
- "(I Should Be Your) Girlfriend" (2006)
- "Hey Lou Reed" (2007)
