= Beacons (festival) =

Music Festival

Beacons Metro
- Genre: Indie rock, alternative rock, dance
- Dates: Mid-August (Beacons); October (Beacons Metro)
- Locations: Heslaker Farm, Skipton, England (Beacons); Various Venues in Leeds, Manchester and Liverpool (Beacons Metro)
- Years active: Beacons (2011–2014); Beacons Metro (2015–2017)
- Website: www.beaconsmetro.com

Beacons Metro is a music festival that took place at various venues in Leeds, Liverpool and Manchester in October 2015–2017. The festival was formerly named simply Beacons and took place on the middle weekend of August 2011–2014 at Heslaker Farm on the Funkirk Estate, Skipton, England.

== History ==
Beacons, which replaced the Moor Music Festival, was set to begin at Heslaker Farm on the Funkirk Estate, Skipton in 2011, with Tom Vek, Jamie Woon and Jamie xx as headliners. The festival was cancelled at the last minute however, due to adverse weather. In 2012 the festival returned and took place for the first time with headline performances from Roots Manuva, Factory Floor, Cass McCombs, Willy Mason and King Krule. The 2013 festival took place across 16–18 August and featured performances from Django Django, Savages, Local Natives and Fucked Up. The 2014 festival, headlined by Daughter, The Fall and Action Bronson, was the last to take place at Heslaker. In February 2015 the organisers announced that, despite Beacons 2014 being the "best ... so far", feedback they had received suggested that "the cost of attending a traditional, camping festival was becoming increasingly difficult to meet" for many festival goers and, as a result, they had made the decision to change the format to an inner-city festival, with events in Leeds, Manchester and Liverpool in October of that year. This tri-city event, "the next stage of the festival's evolution", was renamed Beacons Metro. The Leeds leg of Beacons Metro, part of a 12-week programme of events, opened with a performance from Pissed Jeans at Belgrave Music Hall before moving to the three-storey Headrow House, formally home to the "notorious" Big Lil's nightclub which was closed in 2004 after a number of violent incidents, while the Manchester leg featured a performance from Mac DeMarco at the city's Albert Hall.
