= Symphonies (song) =

Single by Dan Black

from the album UN
- Released: 29 June 2009
- Recorded: 2008
- Genre: Alternative dance; hip hop; electronic
- Length: 3:41
- Label: A&M; The Hours; Polydor (UK); Cocoon Recordings (DE); Embassy of Music (DE)
- Songwriter: Dan Black
- Producer: Dan Black

Dan Black singles chronology
"Yours" (2008)	"Symphonies" (2009)	"U + Me =" (2009)

Remix EP cover
- Cover for the remix EP, featuring Kid Cudi.

"Symphonies" is a song by British musician Dan Black, released as the first single from his 2009 debut album UN.

Evolving from his previous single "HYPNTZ", the track was written, composed, and produced by Black himself.

The track was released as the U.S. iTunes "Single of the Week" for the week of 28 December 2009 and the video was released on iTunes for free for the week of 15 March 2010. A remix of the song was recorded with Kid Cudi, and was released as a bonus track in the United States.

The track has also been used in the "A More Exciting Place to Live" ad campaign by Virgin Media in the UK. It was also used in 2010 comedy film Easy A and used on the NBA 2K11 soundtrack.

== Conception and production ==
In 2008, Black originally recorded a song called "HYPNTZ", which interpolated lyrics from "Hypnotize", a song by The Notorious B.I.G. (Christopher Wallace), and sampled the drum beat from Rihanna's "Umbrella". However, the night before the video was shot, Wallace's estate informed Black of its objection to the song. Black reworked new lyrics for the song and added vocals, retitling it "Symphonies".

The track prominently samples the City of Prague Philharmonic Orchestra's cover of the main theme from the film Starman written by Jack Nitzsche. The sample appears throughout the track, mainly during the chorus.

An instrumental version of the track was featured on a Virgin Media advertisement. The remixed version of the song with Kid Cudi has also been used in 2K Sports video game, NBA 2K11. A Dada Life remix of the song is used in the trailer for the HBO series, Euphoria.

== Music video ==
The song's music video features many fictional movie trailers, with each movie's title being the line of the song that is said while the trailer is shown.

The video was nominated for Best Special Effects in a Video and Breakthrough Video at the 2010 MTV Video Music Awards, but lost in both categories.

== Track listing ==
CD single

1. "Symphonies" - 3:43

7" Single

A. "Symphonies" - 3:43
B. "Symphonies" (Passion Pit Remix) – 4:24

Limited Edition 12" Single

A1. "Symphonies" (Passion Pit Remix) – 4:24
A2. "Symphonies" (Hot City Remix) – 5:16
B. "Symphonies" (Duff Disco Remix) - 6:03

United Kingdom Remix EP

1. "Symphonies" (Passion Pit Remix) – 4:24
2. "Symphonies" (Hot City Remix) – 5:16
3. "Symphonies" (David E Sugar Remix) - 5:50
4. "Symphonies" (Duff Disco Remix) - 6:03

United States Remix EP

1. "Symphonies" - 3:39
2. "Symphonies" (featuring Kid Cudi) - 3:46
3. "Symphonies" (Chris Lake Remix) (featuring Kid Cudi) - 6:44
4. "Symphonies" (Dada Life Remix) (featuring Kid Cudi) - 4:24
5. "Symphonies" (Gigi Barocco Remix) (featuring Kid Cudi) - 4:42
6. "Symphonies" (Passion Pit Remix) - 4:22

== Chart positions ==
Chart (2010)	Peak position
US Alternative Airplay (Billboard)	34
