= The Servant (band) =

British rock band

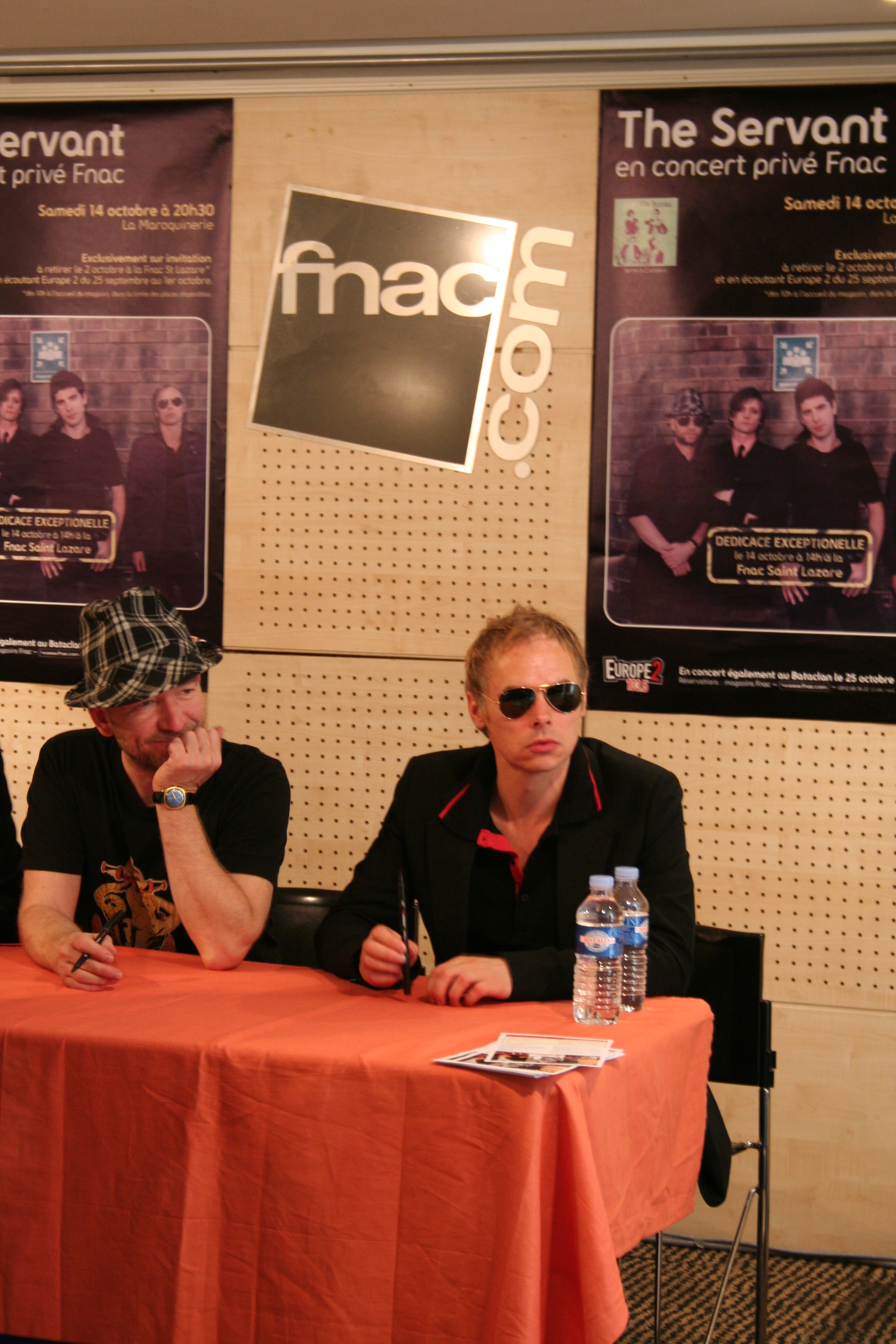
- Autograph session at Fnac Saint-Lazare (Paris, France)

Background information
- Origin: London, United Kingdom
- Genres: Alternative rock, indie rock, indie pop
- Years active: 1998–2007
- Labels: Prolifica, Recall Group
- Past members: Dan Black; Matt Fisher; Chris Burrows; Trevor Sharpe

The Servant was an English alternative band, formed in London in 1998. They were more popular in France, Spain, Switzerland as well as other European countries than they were in their home territory.

The band's debut album received a largely negative review in the NME. French cultural magazine Les Inrockuptibles was more positive, reflecting the posthumous judgment in The Guardian which described the band as having "flirted with international success over their decade-long career before finally splitting in 2007" in a feature on lead singer Dan Black, by then a solo artist.

Black, Fisher and Sharpe were originally guitarist, bassist, and drummer in Minty, the former band of the late Leigh Bowery. Minty were involved in the Romo scene in 1995-1997; Sharpe also played drums for another Romo band, Plastic Fantastic.

They produced two EPs and two albums between 1999 and 2006.

The band split up in 2007. A compilation album was released in 2014.

== History ==
Their first introduction to an American audience was in the trailer of the film Sin City with the instrumental version of their song "Cells". This version of "Cells" is not on the Sin City soundtrack, but it can be downloaded via their website ("Cells" was also used in the film The Transporter and Transporter 2, along with their song, "Body"). Since the Sin City trailers, there has been significant U.S. interest in their records and demands for live concerts.

Before achieving commercial success in 2004 with their self-titled album, released by Prolifica Records in the UK and by Recall Group in France, The Servant released two EPs: Mathematics in 1999 and With the Invisible in 2000.

The band released their fourth album entitled How To Destroy A Relationship in 2006.

On 26 November 2007, the band announced on their blog at MySpace that they were splitting up "to move on to pastures new".

On 8 September 2014, to mark the 10 years since the release of their first album, The Servant released a 'Best Of' compilation, called "Collection", for digital download world-wide. The compilation album features previously unreleased tracks, such as "Away". The single "Away", recorded with producer Jim Lowe (Stereophonics, The Charlatans) was released on 23 June 2014.

== Members ==
- Dan Black - vocals, rhythm guitar, keyboard, laptop
- Chris Burrows - lead guitar
- Matt Fisher - bass guitar
- Trevor Sharpe - drums, percussion

=== Dan Black ===
Dan Black was the lead singer for the band; he also played guitar and wrote many of the band's songs. He is also known as a guest vocalist for the Italian group Planet Funk. Black has since begun a solo career releasing Billboard single Symphonies and touring across the United States.

== Discography ==
=== Studio albums ===
- The Servant (2004)
- How to Destroy a Relationship (2006)

=== Extended Plays ===
- Mathematics (1999)
- With the Invisible (2000)

=== Singles ===
- "The Apes and the Chimpanzees"
- "In a Public Place"
- "Milk Chocolate" (Promo)
- "Orchestra"
- "Liquefy"
- "Cells"
- "I Can Walk in Your Mind" (Promo)
- "How To Destroy a Relationship"
- "(I Should Be Your) Girlfriend"
- "Hey Lou Reed"
