= Humble (production studio) =

American production studio

- Industry: Direction, Post-production, Design, Special effects, Animation, Visual effects, Color grading
- Founded: 2006
- Headquarters: New York City, USA
- Number of locations: 1
- Website: www.humble.tv

Humble is a commercial production company with offices in New York and Los Angeles. Humble and its sister post-production company Postal, specialize in the integration of live action production, design, edit, animation, and visual effects for advertising and original creative content.

== History ==
Humble, launched in 2006 by Eric Berkowitz, is a New York-based production house, known for film direction, special effects, animation, motion graphics, 3D modeling and visual effects for television commercials, video content for the web & mobile devices, and music videos. Humble's work for Domino's Pizza was awarded a Clio and nominated for an Emmy. The Humble-produced music video for "Uprising" by Muse won the 2010 MTV Video Music Award for "Best Special Effects". Other artists' music videos produced by Humble include Wolfmother and Passion Pit.

In 2010 Humble expanded their production offering to include digital production services beyond video content.
