= MTV Video Music Award – Breakthrough Video =

Annual music video award

MTV Video Music Award for Breakthrough Video
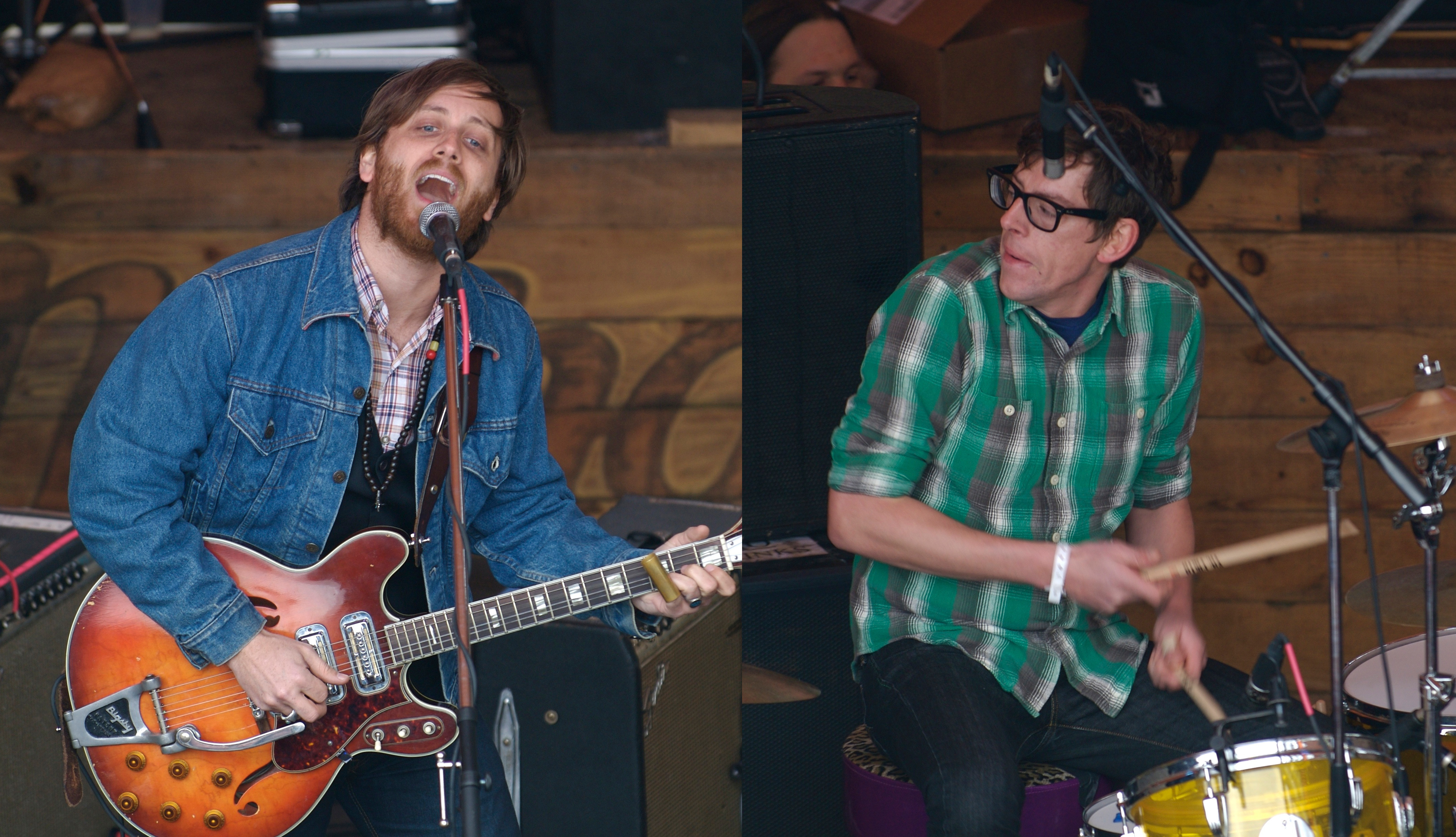
- "Tighten Up" by The Black Keys is the last recipient of this award.
- Country: United States
- Presented by: MTV
- First award: 1988
- Final award: 2010
- Currently held by: The Black Keys – "Tighten Up" (2010)

Highlights
- Most wins: R.E.M. & Fatboy Slim (2)
- Most nominations: Björk, Busta Rhymes, Coldplay, Gorillaz & R.E.M. (3)
- Website: VMA website

The MTV Video Music Award for Breakthrough Video was first awarded in 1988, replacing the award for Most Experimental Video. Along with Best Direction in a Video, this award was considered to be one of the most important professional categories at the VMAs, as every once in a while it was even presented during the main show (unlike most technical awards which were presented during the pre-show).

The award for Breakthrough Video was given out every year from 1988 to 2005, after which it was retired. In 2009, however, MTV decided to bring back this category and continued to present it until 2010, after which it was retired again.

R.E.M. and Fatboy Slim are the two biggest winners of this award, as they each have won it twice. Art of Noise, meanwhile, is the only artist or group to have won this award under its two incarnations: Most Experimental Video in 1985 and Breakthrough Video in 1989.

== Recipients ==
=== 1980s ===
Recipients
Year (Note: Each year is linked to the article about the MTV Video Music Awards held that year.)	Winner(s)	Video	Nominees	Ref.
1988	INXS	"Need You Tonight" / "Mediate"	George Harrison – "When We Was Fab"; Squeeze – "Hourglass"; Suzanne Vega – "Luka"; XTC – "Dear God"	
1989	Art of Noise (featuring Tom Jones)	"Kiss"	Paula Abdul – "Straight Up"; Elvis Costello – "Veronica"; The Escape Club – "Wild, Wild West"; Fine Young Cannibals – "She Drives Me Crazy"; Michael Jackson – "Leave Me Alone"; Jody Watley – "Real Love"	

=== 1990s ===
Recipients
Year (Note: Each year is linked to the article about the MTV Video Music Awards held that year.)	Winner(s)	Video	Nominees	Ref.
1990	Tears for Fears	"Sowing the Seeds of Love"	Paula Abdul – "Opposites Attract"; Sinéad O'Connor – "Nothing Compares 2 U"; Red Hot Chili Peppers – "Higher Ground"	
1991	R.E.M.	"Losing My Religion"	Deee-Lite – "Groove Is in the Heart"; Enigma – "Sadeness (Part I)"; Seal – "Crazy"	
1992	Red Hot Chili Peppers	"Give It Away"	Tori Amos – "Silent All These Years"; David Byrne – "She's Mad"; Van Halen – "Right Now"	
1993	Los Lobos	"Kiko and the Lavender Moon"	Aerosmith – "Livin' on the Edge"; Terence Trent D'Arby – "She Kissed Me"; Green Jellÿ – "Three Little Pigs"; George Michael – "Killer" / "Papa Was a Rollin' Stone"; Porno for Pyros – "Pets"	
1994	R.E.M.	"Everybody Hurts"	Beastie Boys – "Sabotage"; Björk – "Human Behaviour"; Deep Forest – "Sweet Lullaby"; Nine Inch Nails – "Closer"	
1995	Weezer	"Buddy Holly"	Green Day – "Basket Case"; Michael Jackson and Janet Jackson – "Scream"; TLC – "Waterfalls"	
1996	The Smashing Pumpkins	"Tonight, Tonight"	Björk – "It's Oh So Quiet"; Busta Rhymes – "Woo Hah!! Got You All in Check"; Foo Fighters – "Big Me"; Garbage – "Queer"; Radiohead – "Just"	
1997	Jamiroquai	"Virtual Insanity"	The Chemical Brothers – "Setting Sun"; Daft Punk – "Da Funk"; Missy Elliott – "The Rain (Supa Dupa Fly)"; Radiohead – "Paranoid Android"	
1998	The Prodigy	"Smack My Bitch Up"	Busta Rhymes – "Put Your Hands Where My Eyes Could See"; Garbage – "Push It"; Sean Lennon – "Home"; Madonna – "Ray of Light"; Roni Size/Reprazent – "Brown Paper Bag"	
1999	Fatboy Slim	"Praise You"	Busta Rhymes – "Gimme Some More"; Eels – "Last Stop: This Town"; Eminem (featuring Dr. Dre) – "Guilty Conscience"; Korn – "Freak on a Leash"; Unkle (featuring Thom Yorke) – "Rabbit in Your Headlights"	

=== 2000s ===
Recipients
Year (Note: Each year is linked to the article about the MTV Video Music Awards held that year.)	Winner(s)	Video	Nominees	Ref.
2000	Björk	"All Is Full of Love"	Blur – "Coffee & TV"; The Chemical Brothers – "Let Forever Be"; Nine Inch Nails – "Into the Void"; Supergrass – "Pumping on Your Stereo"	
2001	Fatboy Slim	"Weapon of Choice"	Common (featuring Macy Gray) – "Geto Heaven (Remix)"; Gorillaz – "Clint Eastwood"; NSYNC – "Pop"; R.E.M. – "Imitation of Life"; Robbie Williams – "Rock DJ"	
2002	The White Stripes	"Fell in Love with a Girl"	Cake – "Short Skirt/Long Jacket"; Coldplay – "Trouble"; The Crystal Method – "Name of the Game"; DMX – "Who We Be"; Maxwell – "This Woman's Work"	
2003	Coldplay	"The Scientist"	Floetry – "Floetic"; Kenna – "Freetime"; Queens of the Stone Age – "Go with the Flow"; Sum 41 – "The Hell Song"	
2004	Franz Ferdinand	"Take Me Out"	Modest Mouse – "Float On"; New Found Glory – "All Downhill from Here"; Steriogram – "Walkie Talkie Man"; Kanye West (featuring Syleena Johnson) – "All Falls Down"; The White Stripes – "The Hardest Button to Button"	
2005	Gorillaz	"Feel Good Inc."	Missy Elliott (featuring Ciara and Fatman Scoop) – "Lose Control"; Eminem – "Mosh"; Sarah McLachlan – "World on Fire"; U2 – "Vertigo"	
2006 – 2008	—N/a			
2009	Matt & Kim	"Lessons Learned"	Anjulie – "Boom"; Bat for Lashes – "Daniel"; Chairlift – "Evident Utensil"; Cold War Kids – "I've Seen Enough"; Death Cab for Cutie – "Grapevine Fires"; Gnarls Barkley – "Who's Gonna Save My Soul"; Major Lazer – "Hold the Line"; Passion Pit – "The Reeling"; Yeah Yeah Yeahs – "Heads Will Roll"	

=== 2010s ===
Recipients
Year (Note: Each year is linked to the article about the MTV Video Music Awards held that year.)	Winner(s)	Video	Nominees	Ref.
2010	The Black Keys	"Tighten Up"	Dan Black – "Symphonies"; Coldplay – "Strawberry Swing"; Gorillaz (featuring Bobby Womack and Mos Def) – "Stylo"	

== Statistics ==
=== Artists with multiple wins ===
2 wins

- Fatboy Slim
- R.E.M.

=== Artists with multiple nominations ===
3 nominations

- Björk
- Busta Rhymes
- Coldplay
- Gorillaz
- R.E.M.

2 nominations

- Eminem
- Fatboy Slim
- Garbage
- Michael Jackson
- Missy Elliott
- Nine Inch Nails
- Paula Abdul
- Radiohead
- Red Hot Chili Peppers
- The Chemical Brothers
- The White Stripes
