= Max Colt =

Ukrainian visual effect producer

- Born: Maksym Chyzhevskyi; December 10, 1982 (age 43); Alchevsk, Ukrainian SSR, Soviet Union (now Ukraine)
- Occupation: Visual Effects Producer
- Years active: 2010–present
- Spouse: Valeriya Valeyeva
- Children: Eva and Nicole Colt
- Website: www.maxcolt.com

Max Colt (born Maksym Chyzhevskyy, (Note: Ukrainian: Максим Чижевський, romanized: Maksym Chyzhevskyi) December 10, 1982) is a visual effects producer and supervisor. He won MTV Video Music Award in 2015 for Best Visual Effects for his work on music video for Justin Bieber, Skrillex and Diplo and 2016 MTV Video Music Award for Coldplay "Up&Up" music video. He has produced visual effects for music videos for artists such as Britney Spears, Imagine Dragons, Justin Bieber, Kanye West, Foals, Ariana Grande and Shakira. Colt was born in Alchevsk, Ukraine.

== Early career ==
Early in his career, Max spent time working as a Creative director for an advertising firm with brands including Coca-Cola, Henkel, and Procter & Gamble. He participated in Ukrainian national video projects such as: Pray for Ukraine, directed by Evgeny Afineevsky,

Max moved to Los Angeles in 2014 where he began working on music videos, commercials and feature films. He studied visual effects production at Gnomon visual effects school.

== Present career ==
Colt now spends most of his time in visual effects. Since 2010, he produced more than 300 music videos, several short and feature films and nearly 50 commercials.

== Awards ==
2015 the MTV Video Music Award for Best Visual Effects with Skrillex and Diplo for Justin Bieber's "Where Are Ü Now."

2016 MTV Music Video Awards for Best Visual Effects with Coldplay.

2016 Cannes Lions International Festival of Creativity / Film Craft (Silver) with Coldplay - "UP&UP"

== Films ==
- American Gods (TV series)
- Abattoir, directed by Darren Lynn Bousman
- Robin Hood (2018 film)
- Romka, directed by Evgeny Afineevsky
- The Harvesting directed by Ivan Kraljevic
- Winter on Fire, directed by Evgeny Afineevsky

== Commercials ==
- Nike Commercial 2016
- Jordan C OVO 2016
- Tele2 Settle for more with Joel Kinnaman
- FIFA World Cup ''19
- Apple Music with The Weeknd
- Courtyard by Marriott
- Yves Saint Laurent (designer)
- Helmut Lang (fashion brand) and Jeremy Deller
- Capcom

== Music videography ==
- Travis Scott - "Butterfly Effect"
- Pink (singer) - "Beautiful Trauma"
- Avril Lavigne - "Heads Above The Water"
- Kanye West - "Fade"
- The Weeknd - "Party Monster"
- Coldplay - "Up&Up"
- Fergie- "Milf"
- Galantis - "Runaway (U & I)"
- Imagine Dragons - "Shots"
- Muse - "Mercy"
- Ariana Grande - "One Last Time"
- Ten Walls - "Walking With Elephants"
- Redfoo - "New Thang"
- Nicki Minaj - "Anaconda"
- Paris Hilton - "Come Alive"
- French Montana - "Gifted ft. The Weeknd"
- James Blake [life round here] ft. Chance The Rapper
- DJ Khaled ft. Drake, Rick Ross, Lil Wayne - "No New Friends"
- Tyga ft. Chris Brown - "Fuck For The Road"
- Jason Derulo - "The Other Side"
- David Guetta - "Just One Last Time ft. Taped Rai"
- Juicy J ft. Lil Wayne - "Bands A Make Her Dance"
- Foals - "Bad habit"
- Chris Brown - "Fine China"
- Nicki Minaj, Cassie - "The Boys"
- Nicki Minaj — "I am your leader"
- Lil Wayne ft. Big Sean "My Homies Still"
- DJ Khaled "Take It to the Head" ft. Chris Brown . Rick Ross . Nicki Minaj . Lil Wayne
- Rick Ross, Meek Mill & T-Pain - "Bag of Money"
- Mary J. Blige feat Rick Ross – "Why"
- Justin Bieber – "Boyfriend"
- Tyga ft. Big Sean - "IM GONE"
- J. Cole ft. Missy Elliott - "Nobody's perfect"
- French Montana ft. Rick Ross, Diddy and Charlie Rock - "Shot Caller" (Remix)
- Diddy / Dirty Money Feat. Chris Brown – "Yesterday"
- Mary J. Blige ft Diddy and Lil Wayne – "Someone To Love Me" (Naked)
- Melanie Fiona – "Never Coming Back"
- Diddy Dirty Money feat. Trey Songz and Rick Ross – "YourLove"
- Lil Wayne ft. Rick Ross – "John" (Explicit)
- Chris Brown – "SheAin'tYou"
- Chris Brown ft. Busta Rhymes and Lil Wayne – "LookAtMeNow"
- Chris Brown feat. Justin Bieber – "Next 2 You"
- Jason Derulo – "Breathing"
- Chris Brown ft. Kevin K-MAC McCall – "Strip"
- FreeSol ft. Justin Timberlake and Timbaland – "Fascinated"
- Jessie J – "Domino"
