= 2010 MTV Video Music Awards =

Award ceremony

- Date: Sunday, September 12, 2010
- Location: Nokia Theatre (Los Angeles, California)
- Country: United States
- Hosted by: Chelsea Handler

Highlights
- Most awards: Lady Gaga (8)
- Most nominations: Lady Gaga (13)

Television/radio coverage
- Network: MTV and VH1
- Produced by: Jesse Ignjatovic; Dave Sirulnick
- Directed by: Hamish Hamilton

The 2010 MTV Video Music Awards took place on September 12, 2010 at Nokia Theatre in Los Angeles, honoring the best music videos from the previous year. Chelsea Handler hosted the event, the first woman in sixteen years – since the 1994 MTV Video Music Awards – to do so.

Being nominated 13 times, Lady Gaga became the most-nominated artist in VMA history for a single year and subsequently became the first female artist to receive two nominations for Video of the Year when both "Bad Romance" and "Telephone" were nominated for the award. She was also the top winner of the night when "Telephone" won Best Collaboration and "Bad Romance" won seven separate awards including Video of the Year, bringing her total number of moonmen to eight. When she accepted her award for Video of the Year, she also announced the title of her second studio album, Born This Way and sang an excerpt from the title track. She accepted the award while wearing a dress complete with a hat, purse, and shoes all made entirely from cuts of raw meat, which drew backlash from PETA.

Overall, the show grabbed 11.4 million viewers – the largest audience for a Video Music Awards show since 2002.

== Performances ==
Artist(s)	Song(s)
Pre-show
Nicki Minaj will.i.am	"Your Love" (intro) "Check It Out"
Main show
Eminem; Rihanna	"Not Afraid" / "Love the Way You Lie"
Justin Bieber	"U Smile" (intro) "Baby" "Somebody to Love"
Usher	"DJ Got Us Fallin' in Love" "OMG"
Florence and the Machine	"Dog Days Are Over"
Taylor Swift	"Innocent"
Drake; Mary J. Blige; Swizz Beatz	"Fancy"
B.o.B; Bruno Mars; Paramore	"Nothin' on You" (intro) "Airplanes" "The Only Exception"
Linkin Park	"The Catalyst"
Kanye West; Pusha T	"Runaway"

The house artist was Deadmau5. The following performed along with him:

- Travie McCoy – "Billionaire"
- Jason Derulo – "Ridin' Solo"
- Robyn – "Dancing on My Own"

Outside in the parking lot there were the following performances:

- N.E.R.D. and Ciara – "Hot-n-Fun"

Source: Performers

== Winners and nominees ==
Winners are in bold text.

Video of the Year	Best Male Video
**Lady Gaga – "Bad Romance"**; B.o.B (featuring Hayley Williams) – "Airplanes"; Eminem – "Not Afraid"; Florence + the Machine – "Dog Days Are Over"; Lady Gaga (featuring Beyoncé) – "Telephone"; Thirty Seconds to Mars – "Kings and Queens"	**Eminem – "Not Afraid"**; B.o.B (featuring Hayley Williams) – "Airplanes"; Jason Derulo – "In My Head"; Drake – "Find Your Love"; Usher (featuring will.i.am) – "OMG"
Best Female Video	Best New Artist
**Lady Gaga – "Bad Romance"**; Beyoncé (featuring Lady Gaga) – "Video Phone (Extended Remix)"; Kesha – "Tik Tok"; Katy Perry (featuring Snoop Dogg) – "California Gurls"; Taylor Swift – "Fifteen"	**Justin Bieber (featuring Ludacris) – "Baby"**; Broken Bells – "The Ghost Inside"; Jason Derulo – "In My Head"; Kesha – "Tik Tok"; Nicki Minaj (featuring Sean Garrett) – "Massive Attack"
Best Pop Video	Best Rock Video
**Lady Gaga – "Bad Romance"**; B.o.B (featuring Bruno Mars) – "Nothin' on You"; Beyoncé (featuring Lady Gaga) – "Video Phone (Extended Remix)"; Kesha – "Tik Tok"; Katy Perry (featuring Snoop Dogg) – "California Gurls"	**Thirty Seconds to Mars – "Kings and Queens"**; Florence + the Machine – "Dog Days Are Over"; MGMT – "Flash Delirium"; Muse – "Uprising"; Paramore – "Ignorance"
Best Hip-Hop Video	Best Dance Music Video
**Eminem – "Not Afraid"**; B.o.B (featuring Hayley Williams) – "Airplanes"; Drake (featuring Kanye West, Lil Wayne and Eminem) – "Forever"; Jay-Z (featuring Swizz Beatz) – "On to the Next One"; Kid Cudi (featuring MGMT and Ratatat) – "Pursuit of Happiness"	**Lady Gaga – "Bad Romance"**; Cascada – "Evacuate the Dancefloor"; David Guetta (featuring Akon) – "Sexy Chick"; Enrique Iglesias (featuring Pitbull) – "I Like It" (Jersey Shore Version); Usher (featuring will.i.am) – "OMG"
Best Collaboration	Breakthrough Video
**Lady Gaga (featuring Beyoncé) – "Telephone"**; 3OH!3 (featuring Kesha) – "My First Kiss"; Beyoncé (featuring Lady Gaga) – "Video Phone (Extended Remix)"; B.o.B (featuring Hayley Williams) – "Airplanes"; Jay-Z and Alicia Keys – "Empire State of Mind"	**The Black Keys – "Tighten Up"**; Dan Black – "Symphonies"; Coldplay – "Strawberry Swing"; Gorillaz (featuring Bobby Womack and Mos Def) – "Stylo"
Best Direction	Best Choreography
**Lady Gaga – "Bad Romance" (Director: Francis Lawrence)**; Eminem – "Not Afraid" (Director: Rich Lee); Jay-Z and Alicia Keys – "Empire State of Mind" (Director: Hype Williams); Pink – "Funhouse" (Director: Dave Meyers); Thirty Seconds to Mars – "Kings and Queens" (Director: Bartholomew Cubbins)	**Lady Gaga – "Bad Romance" (Choreographer: Laurieann Gibson)**; Beyoncé (featuring Lady Gaga) – "Video Phone (Extended Remix)" (Choreographers: Frank Gatson, Phlex and Bryan Tanaka); Lady Gaga (featuring Beyoncé) – "Telephone" (Choreographer: Laurieann Gibson); Janelle Monáe (featuring Big Boi) – "Tightrope" (Choreographers: Janelle Monáe and the Memphis Jookin Community); Usher (featuring will.i.am) – "OMG" (Choreographer: Aakomon "AJ" Jones)
Best Special Effects	Best Art Direction
**Muse – "Uprising" (Special Effects: Humble and Sam Stephens)**; Dan Black – "Symphonies" (Special Effects: Corinne Bance and Axel D’Harcourt); Eminem – "Not Afraid" (Special Effects: Animaholics-VFX); Green Day – "21st Century Breakdown" (Special Effects: Laundry); Lady Gaga – "Bad Romance" (Special Effects: Skulley Effects VFX)	**Florence + the Machine – "Dog Days Are Over" (Art Directors: Louise Corcoran and Aldene Johnson)**; Beyoncé (featuring Lady Gaga) – "Video Phone (Extended Remix)" (Art Director: Lenny Tso); Eminem – "Not Afraid" (Art Director: Ethan Tobman); Lady Gaga – "Bad Romance" (Art Director: Charles Infante); Thirty Seconds to Mars – "Kings and Queens" (Art Director: Marc Benacerraf)
Best Editing	Best Cinematography
**Lady Gaga – "Bad Romance" (Editor: Jarrett Fijal)**; Eminem – "Not Afraid" (Editor: Ken Mowe); Miike Snow – "Animal" (Editor: Frank Macias); Pink – "Funhouse" (Editor: Chris Davis); Rihanna – "Rude Boy" (Editor: Clark Eddy)	**Jay-Z and Alicia Keys – "Empire State of Mind" (Director of Photography: John Perez)**; Eminem – "Not Afraid" (Director of Photography: Christopher Probst); Florence + the Machine – "Dog Days Are Over" (Director of Photography: Adam Frisch); Lady Gaga – "Bad Romance" (Director of Photography: Thomas Kloss); Mumford & Sons – "Little Lion Man" (Director of Photography: Ben Magahy)
Latino Artist of the Year
**Aventura**; Camila; Daddy Yankee; Pitbull; Shakira; Wisin & Yandel

== Artists with multiple wins and nominations ==
Artists who received multiple awards
Wins	Artist
8	Lady Gaga
2	Eminem

Artists who received multiple nominations
Nominations	Artist
13	Lady Gaga
8	Eminem
5	Beyoncé
5	B.o.B
4	Florence + the Machine
4	Jay-Z
4	Thirty Seconds to Mars
3	Alicia Keys
3	Kesha
3	Usher
2	Dan Black
2	Drake
2	Jason Derulo
2	Katy Perry
2	Muse
2	Pink

== Music Videos with multiple wins and nominations ==
Music Videos that received multiple awards
Wins	Artist	Music Video
7	Lady Gaga	"Bad Romance"
2	Eminem	"Not Afraid"

Music Videos that received multiple nominations
Nominations	Artist	Music Video
10	Lady Gaga	"Bad Romance"
8	Eminem	"Not Afraid"
5	Beyoncé (featuring Lady Gaga)	"Video Phone (Extended Remix)"
4	B.o.B. (featuring Hayley Williams)	"Airplanes"
4	Florence + the Machine	"Dog Days Are Over"
4	Thirty Seconds to Mars	"Kings and Queens"
3	Jay-Z & Alicia Keys	"Empire State of Mind"
3	Kesha	"Tik Tok"
3	Lady Gaga (featuring Beyoncé)	"Telephone"
3	Usher (featuring will.i.am)	"OMG"
2	Dan Black	"Symphonies"
2	Jason Derulo	"In My Head"
2	Katy Perry (featuring Snoop Dogg)	"California Gurls"
2	Muse	"Uprising"
2	Pink	"Funhouse"

== Appearances ==
=== Pre-show ===
- Sway Calloway – presented Best Dance Music Video and Best Collaboration

=== Main show ===
- Lindsay Lohan, Rick Ross, Flo Rida and Lil Jon – appeared in the opening sketch
- Ellen DeGeneres – presented Best Female Video
- The cast of Jackass 3D – presented Best Rock Video
- Kim Kardashian – introduced Justin Bieber
- Kesha and Trey Songz – introduced Usher
- Katy Perry and Nicki Minaj – presented Best Male Video
- Jared Leto and Ashley Greene – introduced Florence and the Machine
- Cory Monteith, Chris Colfer, Amber Riley and Jane Lynch – presented Best Pop Video
- Rosario Dawson and Chris Pine – introduced Taylor Swift
- Jesse Eisenberg, Andrew Garfield and Justin Timberlake – introduced Drake, Mary J. Blige and Swizz Beatz
- Joe Manganiello and Evan Rachel Wood – introduced the winners of the professional categories
- The cast of Jersey Shore – appeared in an on-stage skit with host
- Sofía Vergara – presented Best Hip-Hop Video
- Selena Gomez and Ne-Yo – introduced B.o.B, Bruno Mars and Paramore
- Romeo and Victoria Justice – presented Best New Artist
- Emma Stone and Penn Badgley – introduced Linkin Park
- Cher – presented Video of the Year
- Aziz Ansari – introduced Kanye West

Source: presenters

== Controversy ==
=== will.i.am's blackface criticism ===
Some viewers took offense to the producer/ rapper will.i.am's outfit, especially the dark makeup, which, to some fans, was reminiscent of the antiquated, racially charged practice of blackface. After fans blasted the rapper online, he took to Twitter to defend the look as artistic expression and not an embrace of the controversial maquillage typically used to lampoon African-Americans. Will.i.am responded to the backlash on his Twitter stating "1st. just because I where all black including head mask as expression and emphasize my outfit, it shouldn't be looked at as racial," Will tweeted. "Let go of the past. there are far more important things 2 bark about. (Jobs, health, education) not a black man wearing all black everything." Will.i.am insisted the face paint was a harmless costume choice and that fans concerned with the image Will's look projected should focus on larger issues.

=== Lady Gaga's meat dress ===
While accepting her award for Video of the Year, presented by legendary singer and actress Cher, Lady Gaga wore a dress made entirely from cuts of raw meat. The dress bore a resemblance to an artwork, Vanitas: Flesh Dress for an Albino Anorectic, created by Canadian artist Jana Sterbak in 1987. Along with the dress, her hat, shoes, and purse were all made from meat as well. PETA president Ingrid Newkirk issued a statement concerning the controversial outfit. After questioning whether the meat was real or not, Newkirk was quick to disparage Gaga saying, "Meat is the decomposing flesh of a tormented animal who didn't want to die, and after a few hours under the TV lights, it would smell like the rotting flesh it is and likely be crawling in maggots--not too attractive, really." Franc Fernandez, the designer of the meat dress, said later in an interview with MTV, "...it's not a sticky meat. It's not a messy dress at all, surprisingly. [...] It's actually very clean meat, very sturdy and strong and doesn't run at all. [...] The meat dries out, rather than rotting. It becomes jerky." Gaga later explained to Ellen DeGeneres that the outfit exhibited her disapproval with the United States military's Don't ask, don't tell policy and further clarified, "If we don't stand up for what we believe in and if we don't fight for our rights, pretty soon we're going to have as much rights as the meat on our own bones. And I am not a piece of meat." She also commented on the outfit's nature, "...it is certainly no disrespect to anyone that is vegan or vegetarian. As you know, I am the most judgment-free human being on the earth." Afterwards, DeGeneres, who is a vegan, jokingly gave Gaga a bikini and skirt made from lettuce and other various vegetables.

== See also ==
- 2010 MTV Europe Music Awards
