= Middleman (band) =

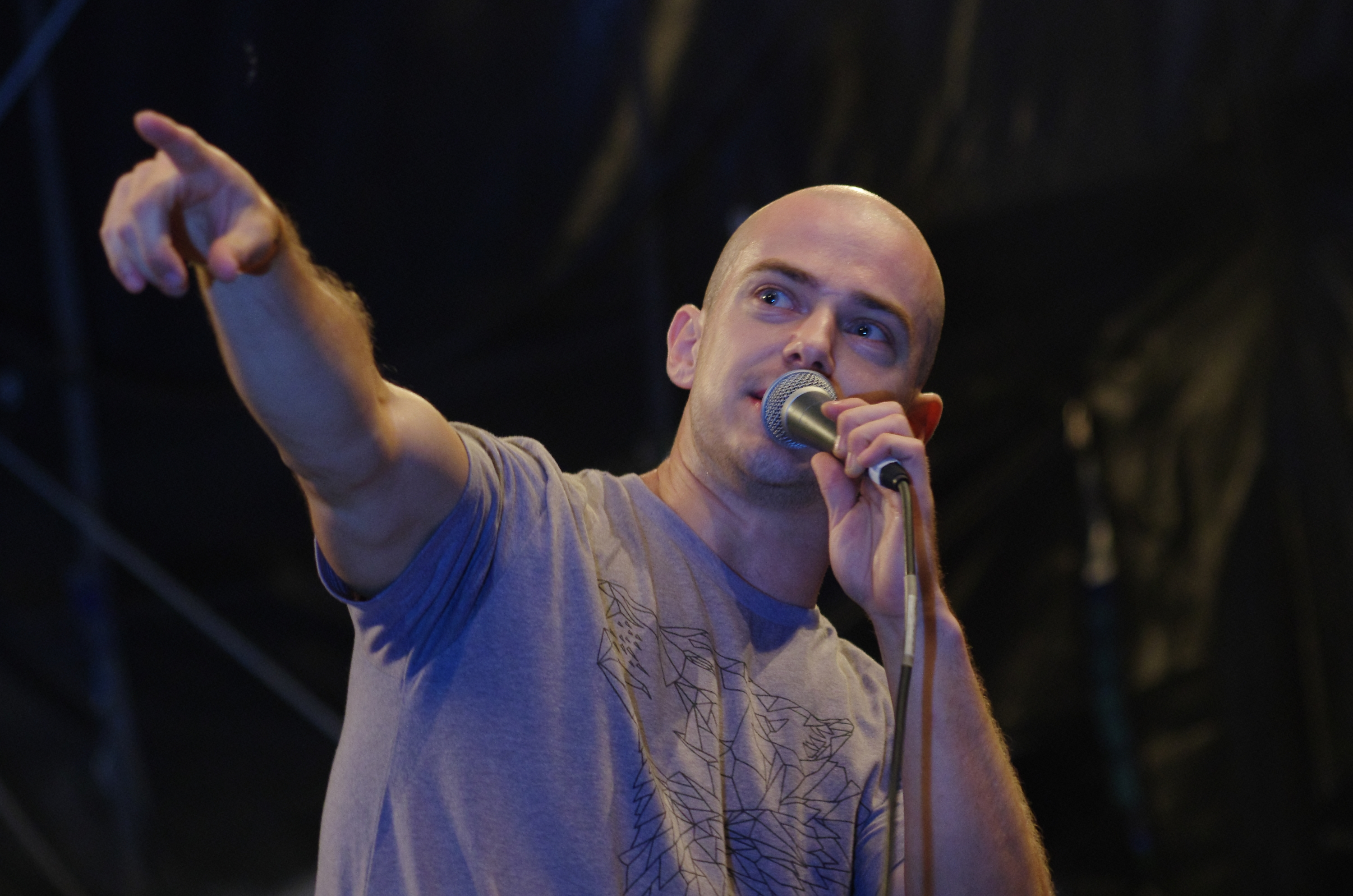
Andy Craven-Griffiths, singer of Middleman at Krach Am Bach Festival 2013 in Beelen, Germany

Middleman are a four-piece alternative rap rock band based in Leeds, West Yorkshire, England. They formed in 2006. They released singles Blah Blah Blah and Good To Be Back on Bad Sneakers records in 2007, and It’s not Over Yet on Blip Records on 5 September 2010. Their next single Chipping Away is due for release on 12 December 2010 on Blip Records. It's Not Over Yet is featured on the basketball game NBA 2K11 by 2K Sports along with tracks from artists such as Snoop Dogg and Two Door Cinema Club.

== Media ==
Middleman have played live sessions for Huw Stephens on BBC Radio 1, Tom Robinson on BBC 6 Music and John Kennedy on XFM. They have received airplay on national radio stations such as BBC Radio 1, Kerrang Radio and XFM from DJs such as Steve Lamacq, Zane Lowe, Colin Murray, Huw Stephens, Rory McConnell and Eddy Temple-Morris. Steve Lamacq voted Middleman his unsigned band of the week in November 2007. Their music has featured on TV programmes such as Soccer AM. The band's song You Look Like You Do appeared on the Neon Nights Mixtape (2007) alongside artists such as Gossip, Crystal Castles and Kate Nash.

== Awards ==
Middleman came second in the 2006 BT Digital Music Awards as Best Unsigned Band, were voted Unsigned Hip Hop Act of the Year by Channel 4 entertainment show Freshly Squeezed, and were the overall winners of the 2009 Futuresound competition which saw them opening the Festival Republic stage at both Reading and Leeds festivals.

== Live ==
Middleman have performed more than 200 live gigs. They have supported artists Lee "Scratch" Perry, The Streets, Jack Penate, Lethal Bizzle, The Go! Team, Toots & the Maytals, Esser, Dan Le Sac Vs Scroobius Pip and The Sunshine Underground. They have performed at more than a dozen festivals including Latitude Festival 2007, Leeds Festival 2007 (Topman Unsigned8 Stage Headline Act), Secret Garden Party 2007 (Main Stage), Beat-Herder 2007, Kendal Calling 2009 (Main Stage), Moor Music Festival 2007 and 2009, Reading Festival 2009 (Festival Republic Stage), Leeds Festival 2009 (on both the Festival Republic Stage and the BBC Introducing Stage), Chapel Allerton Arts Festival, Leeds, UK in 2012 and South by Southwest, Texas, USA in 2010. They toured the Netherlands in May 2010.
