= Dan Black =

British singer-songwriter

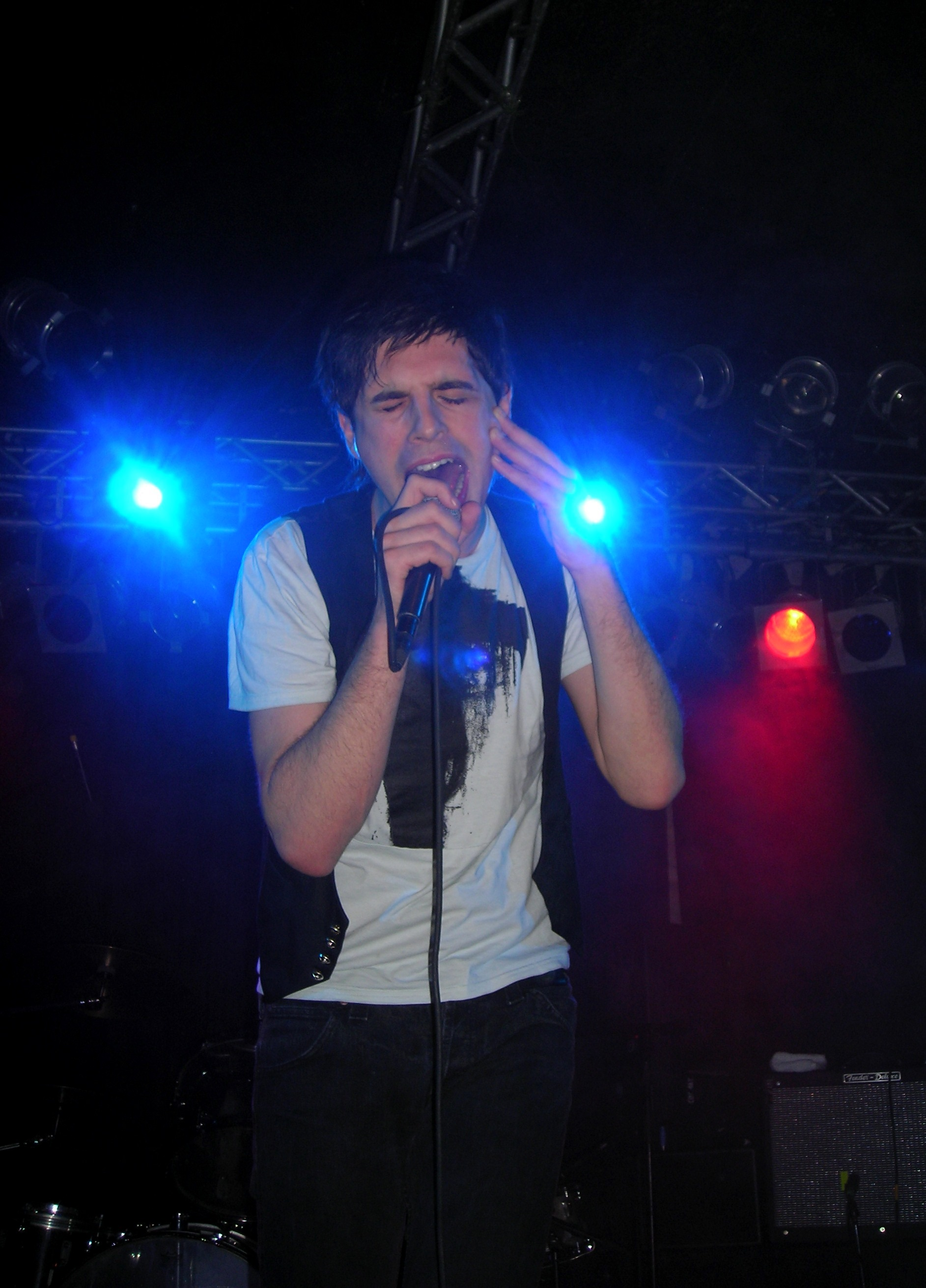
- Black with The Servant live in Rome, 2007

Background information
- Born: Daniel Emmett Black; 16 November 1975 (age 50); Newcastle upon Tyne, England
- Genres: Electronic; alternative dance; wonky pop; synthpop
- Years active: 1998–present
- Labels: The Hours; A&M; Polydor; Ultra
- Website: www.dan-black.com

Daniel Edward Black (born 16 November 1975) is an English singer-songwriter and vocalist. He was a member of alternative rock band the Servant, before their split in 2007. He is also a vocalist for the Italian British group Planet Funk. After releasing his breakthrough song "HYPNTZ", he signed to The:Hours, releasing his first two singles – "Alone" and "Yours" – in 2008. The following year, he released his most commercially successful single to date, "Symphonies".

== Career ==
=== Early career ===
Black was originally a guitarist in Minty, the former band of the late Leigh Bowery. He was also a founding member of Massive Ego, a late addition to the Romo scene, of which Minty had previously been cited as a core band by music magazine Melody Maker. Black was later the lead singer and rhythm guitarist of alternative rock band the Servant. He was a member of the band from their conception in 1998 to their split in 2007.

=== 2008–2012 ===
In 2008, Black released a solo single, "HYPNTZ". The song's lyrics were taken from rapper The Notorious B.I.G.'s "Hypnotize", while its instrumental sampled a cover of "Starman" by the City of Prague Philharmonic Orchestra and Apple Inc's "Vintage Funk Kit 03". The single received positive reviews, with one critic commenting: "It achieves its magic formula in a manner that is both arbitrary and obvious, which is a part of its brilliance. The Umbrella break + Starman soundtrack + a beautiful melodic rendering of a gangsta rap staple: we know exactly what has been done here, and this is why it sounds so good". However, before a planned music video could be shot, The Notorious B.I.G.'s estate informed Black's team of their objection to the use of the "Hypnotize" lyrics. The "HYPNTZ" single was consequently taken out of circulation and the video scrapped.

Black later signed a deal with The:Hours, releasing two singles, "Alone" and "Yours". He gained further popularity in 2009 when his track "U + Me =" was chosen as the UK iTunes Store's "Free Single of the Week". It was later used as the signature tune for BBC Switch's The Cut. Signing a deal with A&M, his debut album UN was released on 13 July 2009. The album was preceded by a single, "Symphonies", which was released after a successful performance at Glastonbury 2009 in the John Peel Tent. Black also performed on the Freeze:Freesports on 4 main stage at London Battersea Power Station in November that year. Other acts performing at the same event were Friendly Fires and Chase & Status.

"Symphonies" was released as the U.S. iTunes "Single of the Week" for the week of 28 December 2009, and the video was released on iTunes for free for the week of 15 March 2010. UN was released in the United States on 16 February 2010, containing three bonus tracks, including a remix of "Symphonies" with American rapper Kid Cudi. "Symphonies" was serviced to American alternative formatted radio stations in its original version, peaking at #34 on the Billboard Alternative Songs chart. The "Symphonies" video was nominated for Best Special Effects in a Video and Breakthrough Video at the 2010 MTV Video Music Awards, but lost in both categories. Symphonies was also put onto the popular video game NBA 2K11

"Symphonies" won the coveted prize "The Christmas Song" in 2010. [source?]

Black toured the U.S. and U.K in February 2010, including a showcase performance in March at SXSW 2010 in Austin, Texas. He also performed at Camp nou in 2011, and at the Austin City Limits Music Festival in October 2010, and was captured "photobombing" a number of attendees.

In 2011, he was featured on Kaskade's album, Fire and Ice on the track "Ice". [source?]

On 31 July 2012, Black released "Raw", a single promoting the new Absolut flavor of vodka, Caipiroska. In 2012, Black's production was featured on American record label GOOD Music's compilation album Cruel Summer, on the song "Creepers", performed by Kid Cudi. [source?]

=== 2013–present ===
Black's second studio album was tentatively set for release in 2013 with the original lead single "Hearts" dropping in mid-2013. That same year, Black stated the working title is Do Not Revenge. In February 2017, Dan Black began teasing the release of the album which was released on 7 July 2017.

== Discography ==
=== Albums ===
==== Studio albums ====
- UN (2009)
- Do Not Revenge (2017)

==== EPs ====
- Dan Black (UN Album Sampler) (2008) (promotional release)
- Dan Black (2009) (promotional release)
- iTunes Live: London Festival '09 (2009)

==== Mixtapes ====
- Weird Science (2010)

=== Singles ===
- "Alone" (2008)
- "Yours" (2008)
- "HYPNTZ" (2008) (limited release)
- "Symphonies" (2009)
- "U + Me =" (2009)
- "Symphonies" (Remix, featuring Kid Cudi) (2010) #34 Billboard Alternative Songs
- "Ghost" (with Kidz in Space) (2010)
- "Sunlight" (with Bag Raiders) (2010)
- "Raw" (2012) (promotional release)
- "Hearts" (featuring Kelis) (2013)
- "Toy Spark Gun" (with SALM (SomethingALaMode)) (2013)
- "Farewell" (featuring Kelis) (2017)
- "Headphones" (2017)
- "Wash Away" (2017)
- "I'm Lost" (2025)
- "I Run Right Back To You" (2025)

=== Other appearances ===
- "ICE" (Kaskade with Dada Life and Dan Black) [Fire & Ice] (2011)

=== Writing and production credits ===
The following songs and albums were written and/or produced by Black for other artists.

- "Creepers" (GOOD Music featuring Kid Cudi) [Cruel Summer] (2012) [writer, producer]
- "Chambre 12", the first album of the French singer Louane Emera (2015) [producer]
- "Gemme", a single by French singer Nolwenn Leroy (2017) [co-writer]
