= Rave (magazine) =

Rave was a UK monthly fan music magazine that covered the pop music scene and mod subculture of the Swinging Sixties in the United Kingdom from 1964 to 1971. It was based in London, and internationally distributed in Europe and Canada.

== History ==
Rave was a monthly music magazine launched in February 1964 by editor Don Wedge (New Musical Express) and published by George Newnes Ltd. It was filled with original photos, posters, interviews and life stories of pop icons from the Beat Generation in the UK. The magazine covered the Beatles, the Rolling Stones, the Who, Small Faces, Cliff Richard, the Spencer Davis Group, the Walker Brothers, Jimi Hendrix, Pink Floyd, Julie Driscoll, Peter Frampton and Marc Bolan to name a few, as well as fashion icons such as Mary Quant, Twiggy and Jean Shrimpton. The music magazine was discontinued in 1971. Similar to Beat Instrumental.

Rave magazine featured respected young women journalists Cathy McGowan, Maureen O'Grady, Dawn James, Claire Rayner and photography work by Jean-Marie Périer, Terry O'Neill, Marc Sharratt, etc. Articles included topics of interest to young women.
