= NBA 2K11 =

2010 basketball video game

- American cover art featuring Michael Jordan
- Developer: Visual Concepts
- Publisher: 2K
- Series: NBA 2K
- Platforms: Microsoft Windows; PlayStation 2 PlayStation 3 PlayStation Portable; Xbox 360; Wii
- Release: NA: October 5, 2010; EU: October 8, 2010; AU: October 8, 2010; JP: October 14, 2010; Wii: NA: October 5, 2010; EU: October 8, 2010; AU: November 11, 2010
- Genre: Sports
- Modes: Single-player, multiplayer

NBA 2K11 is a 2010 basketball simulation video game developed by Visual Concepts and published by 2K. It was released in October 2010 for Microsoft Windows, PlayStation 2, PlayStation 3, PlayStation Portable, Xbox 360, and Nintendo Wii. As the twelfth installment in the NBA 2K series, it is the successor to NBA 2K10 and the predecessor to NBA 2K12. Michael Jordan of the Chicago Bulls is the cover athlete of the game. This is the first game in the series to be compatible with the PlayStation Move.

The game strives to realistically depict the experience of the National Basketball Association (and the NBA G League in association mode). Players mainly play NBA basketball games in a variety of game modes with real and customizable players and teams. MyPlayer mode is one of the modes. In it, players create their own player and play through their career in the NBA. A mode called Association is also present, in which the player assumes control of an NBA organization, and simulates through seasons. Two new modes focusing on Michael Jordan are introduced, as are classic NBA teams. Online modes and quick play options among others are also available.

NBA 2K11 received positive reviews from critics upon release. Positive comments were directed at the overall gameplay and presentation, as well as the introduction of the Michael Jordan-centric modes, while negative comments were concerning the presence of technical issues. By August 2011, the game had sold over 5.5 million copies worldwide. The game is the series' first 2010s entry.

== Gameplay ==
NBA 2K11 is a basketball simulation game which strives to emulate the National Basketball Association. Players mostly play NBA basketball games with real or created players and teams. The game features several aesthetical details found in real televised NBA games, such as commentary from Kevin Harlan, Clark Kellogg, and Steve Kerr (who makes his debut as the lead analyst), halftime shows, replays, customizable camera angles, and other details. Starting from this game, Doris Burke replaces Cheryl Miller as the sideline reporter.

Along with standard online and quick play game modes, several other game modes are present. Association mode allows the player to assume control of an entire NBA organization, simulating through NBA seasons, managing personnel, and participating in off-season activities, such as the draft and free agency. MyPlayer mode returns from NBA 2K10, in which the player creates their own basketball player. The player customizes the appearance, animations, and other aspects of their player, and plays through their basketball career, upgrading their attributes.

One of the game's most-touted features is the "Jordan Challenge" mode. The mode centers on Michael Jordan, and tasks the player with achieving ten of his most memorable accomplishments in his career, such as scoring 69 points in a game. Completing the challenges unlocks a selection of shoes worn by Jordan throughout his career, which can then be used in several game modes. Another mode focusing on Jordan is present after completing the Jordan Challenge (or entering a cheat code), that is similar to the MyPlayer mode, with the player being able to play through an entire career of Jordan had he began his NBA career in the 2010-11 NBA Season. Instead of a customizable player, the player can play with Jordan on any team, and will start as the rookie version before progressing through his career. Jordan's appearance changes as the player progresses in the mode.

Along with current NBA teams, such as the Houston Rockets and Orlando Magic, NBA 2K11 introduces 18 classic NBA teams. The teams are used in the Jordan Challenge mode, but the player may use them in quick play. Some of the teams included are the 1985–86 Boston Celtics, the 1997–98 Utah Jazz, the 1991–92 Portland Trail Blazers, and several of Jordan's Chicago Bulls teams.

== Soundtrack ==
- Snoop Dogg - NBA 2K Theme
- Big Boi - Shutterbug
- Drake - Over
- Cassidy - Game Time
- Ron Artest - Champion
- Duck-Down All Stars, Buckshot, Skyzoo, Promise, Sean Price - Better Than You
- The Alan Parsons Project - Sirius
- Art vs. Science - Hollywood
- Big Rock Candy Mountain - Rocketship
- The Brunettes - Red Rollerskates
- The Chicharones - Little By Little
- Children Collide - Skeleton Dance
- The Constellations, Asher Roth - We're Here to Save the Day
- Dan Black, Kid Cudi - Symphonies (Remix)
- Delorean - Deli
- EV - Home of the Brave (Instrumental)
- Failsafe - Hope & Only If We Learn
- HOGNI - Bow Down
- Kidz in Space - Downtime
- Middleman - It's Not Over Yet
- Rakaa, Aloe Blacc - Crown of Thornes
- The Redland - So Far
- The Russian Futurists - Paul Simon & Precious Metals
- Sonny Bones - Rise
- Two Door Cinema Club - I Can Talk
- Yung Automatik & Bay Root Productions - Go Hard or Go Home
- Dux Jones - Pourin' It On

== Development and release ==
NBA 2K11 was released in October 2010 for Microsoft Windows, PlayStation 2, PlayStation 3, PlayStation Portable, Xbox 360, and Nintendo Wii. It was developed by Visual Concepts and published by 2K Sports, a subsidiary of Take-Two Interactive. Michael Jordan is the game's cover athlete. NBA 2K11 features a soundtrack consisting of 27 songs.

== Reception ==
Reception

Aggregate score
Aggregator	Score
Metacritic	(PC) 82/100 (PS3) 89/100 (X360) 89/100

Review scores
Publication	Score
Destructoid	7.5/10
Game Informer	8.75/10
GameSpot	8/10
GamesRadar+	4.5/5
IGN	8/10
Push Square	9/10
VideoGamer.com	8/10

According to the review aggregation website Metacritic, the Microsoft Windows, PlayStation 3, and Xbox 360 versions of NBA 2K11 all received "generally favorable" reviews from critics upon release. The PlayStation 2, PlayStation Portable, and Nintendo Wii versions of the game do not hold an aggregated score on the website, due to a lack of reviews.

Matt Bertz of Game Informer praised the Michael Jordan-centric mode, calling it "must-play", the realistic presentation, the well-rounded gameplay, the controls, and the soundtrack, describing it as the best in any sports game of the year. Bertz experienced some technical issues, but described them as being minor, finishing his review by saying that other basketball games are inferior to NBA 2K11.

GameSpot's Tom Mc Shea called NBA 2K11 a "huge improvement" over NBA 2K10, citing the "lifelike" presentation, improved artificial intelligence, and "overhauled" controls as reasons for that. He also enjoyed the addition of classic NBA teams, even if he felt that the Michael Jordan-focused mode didn't provide enough entertainment. Mc Shea's biggest criticism of the game focused on the technical issues he encounters, particularly in regard to the online modes.

Richard Grisham from GamesRadar wrote: "No hoops junkie should miss NBA 2K11. It's not just another yearly update with some obligatory back-of-the-box modifications; it's a loving study of the greatest player of his generation and his biggest rivals, played out with beautiful sights and sounds that remind us just how great the Air Jordan era was."

During the 14th Annual Interactive Achievement Awards, the Academy of Interactive Arts & Sciences nominated NBA 2K11 for "Sports Game of the Year".

By August 2011, the game had sold over 5.5 million copies worldwide.
