= List of people from Bradenton, Florida =

This is a list of people who were born in, lived in, or are closely associated with the city of Bradenton, Florida.

== Athletics ==
- Hank Aaron (1934–2021) – Major League Baseball (MLB) player and National Baseball Hall of Fame and Museum inductee
- Freddy Adu (b. 1989) – soccer player
- Hugo Armando (b. 1978) – tennis player
- Sekou Bangoura (b. 1991) – tennis player
- Bob Barron (1928–1991) – NASCAR Cup Series driver
- Waite Bellamy (b. 1940) – Eastern Professional Basketball League player
- Chase Brown (b. 2000) – National Football League (NFL) player
- Sydney Brown (b. 2000) – NFL player
- An Byeong-hun (b. 1991) – PGA Tour golfer
- Sandra Cacic (b. 1974) – tennis player
- Gene Clines (1946–2022) – MLB player
- Kimberly Couts (b. 1989) – tennis player
- Jordan Cox (b. 1992) – tennis player
- Ed Culpepper (1934–2021) – NFL player
- Tiffany Dabek (b. 1990) – tennis player and coach
- Taylor Dent (b. 1981) – tennis player
- Bill Doak (1891–1954) – MLB player
- Eric DuBose (b. 1975) – MLB player
- Brian Dunn (b. 1974) – tennis player
- Victoria Duval (b. 1995) – tennis player
- Tyler Dyson (b. 1997) – MLB player
- Zach Edey (b. 2002) – National Basketball Association (NBA) player
- Deshaun Fenwick (b. 1991) – NFL player
- Tommie Frazier (b. 1974) – Canadian Football League player and college football coach
- Colton Gordon (b. 1998) – MLB player
- Sammy Green (b. 1954) – NFL player
- Rod Harper (b. 1985) – NFL player
- Christian Harrison (b. 1994) – tennis player
- Jamea Jackson (b. 1986) – tennis player
- Hank Johnson (1906–1982) – MLB player
- Shang Juncheng (b. 2005) – tennis player
- Jessica Korda (b. 1993) – LPGA Tour golfer
- Nelly Korda (b. 1998) – LPGA Tour golfer
- Sebastian Korda (b. 2000) – tennis player
- Michaëlla Krajicek (b. 1989) – tennis player
- Rick Lamb (b. 1990) – PGA Tour golfer
- JC Latham (b. 2003) – NFL player
- Kelvin McKnight (b. 1997) – NFL player
- Adrian McPherson (b. 1983) – NFL player
- Ahmad Miller (b. 1978) – NFL player
- Shintaro Mochizuki (b. 2003) – tennis player
- Johnny Moore (1902–1991) – MLB player
- Jamie Moyer (b. 1962) – MLB player
- Naoki Nakagawa (b. 1996) – tennis player
- Sharrod Neasman (b. 1991) – NFL player
- Ingrid Neel (b. 1998) – tennis player
- Ryan Neuzil (b. 1997) – NFL player
- Whitney Osuigwe (b. 2002) – tennis player
- Brian Poole (b. 1992) – NFL player
- Maria Sharapova (b. 1987) – tennis player
- Satnam Singh (b. 1995) – NBA player and wrestler
- Myles Straw (b. 1994) – MLB player
- Sunitha Rao (b. 1985) – tennis player
- John Reeves (b. 1975) – NFL player
- Austin Reiter (b. 1991) – NFL player
- Patrik Rikl (b. 1999) – tennis player
- Clifford Rozier (1972–2018) – NBA player
- Ace Sanders (b. 1991) – NFL player
- Robby Stevenson (b. 1976) – NFL player
- Willie Taggart (b. 1976) – NFL player and coach
- Sarah Taylor (b. 1981) – tennis player
- Peter Warrick (b. 1997) – NFL player
- Fabian Washington (b. 1983) – NFL player
- Benny Williams (b. 2002) – college basketball player
- Todd Williams (b. 1978) – NFL player
- Tyrone Williams (b. 1973) – NFL player
- Mark Workman (1930–1983) former first overall pick in the 1952 NBA draft, by the Milwaukee Hawks, born in Logan, West Virginia

== Arts & entertainment ==
- Chris Berry (b. 1960) – broadcaster
- Graeme Edge (1941–2021) – co-founder of The Moody Blues, drummer, songwriter, and poet
- Alfred Ellis (1941–2021) – member of The J.B.'s, saxophonist, composer, and arranger
- Teri Harrison (b. 1981) – model, actress, and Playboy Playmate
- Helen Jepson (1904–1997) – opera singer
- Al Klink (1915–1991) – saxophonist
- Charles Trippy (b. 1984) – bassist for We the Kings and YouTuber
- Sam Woolf (b. 1996) – singer-songwriter

== Military, politics, & public service ==
- Jim Boyd (b. 1956) – Florida Senate majority leader
- George E. Martin (1902–1995) – US Army major general, lived in Bradenton during retirement
- Greg Steube (b. 1978) – U.S. representative

== Other ==
- Anthony Rossi (1900–1993) – businessman and founder of Tropicana
