= State College of Florida, Manatee–Sarasota =

Public college in Bradenton, Florida, US

State College of Florida, Manatee-Sarasota
- Other name: SCF
- Former names: Manatee Junior College; Manatee Community College
- Motto: Veritas Libertas
- Motto in English: "The Truth Is Freedom"
- Type: Public college
- Established: September 17, 1957; 69 years ago
- Parent institution: Florida College System
- Accreditation: Southern Association of Colleges and Schools
- Endowment: $62 million
- President: Tommy Gregory
- Students: 8,424 ( 2021–22 )
- Location: Bradenton, Florida, United States
- Colors: Green, Dark Blue, Teal Blue, Light Blue
- Nickname: The Manatees
- Sporting affiliations: Division I NJCAA, FCSAA
- Mascot: Maverick the Manatee
- Website: www.scf.edu

State College of Florida, Manatee–Sarasota (SCF) is a public college with campuses in the Manatee and Sarasota counties of Florida, United States. Part of the Florida College System, it is designated a "state college" because it offers a greater number of bachelor's degrees than community colleges. SCF is accredited by the Southern Association of Colleges and Schools. Founded in 1957 as Manatee Junior College, it was known as Manatee Community College from 1985 to 2009.

State College of Florida is the region's oldest and largest public college, operating three campuses serving Bradenton, Lakewood Ranch, and Venice. SCF's official colors are green, white, and blue. The college's intercollegiate sports teams are "The Manatees" and are represented by mascot Maverick the Manatee.

== History ==
State College of Florida, Manatee–Sarasota was established on September 17, 1957, by the Florida Board of Education as Manatee Junior College (MJC). The college came into existence under a plan of the State Board of Education to provide accessible higher education to Florida's population.

In November 1957, Samuel R. Neel Jr became the college's first president, and the first classes were held on September 2, 1958, in what was formerly a senior high school; enrollment in the first term was 502 students. The college began administering classes in its own facilities in 1959, where the Bradenton campus stands today. Neel Auditorium, an 830-seat auditorium, would be dedicated October 29, 1966, on the Bradenton campus. State College of Florida's 100-acre (40 ha) Bradenton campus is home to The SCF Collegiate School (SCFCS), The Family Heritage House Museum, SCF's Dental Hygiene Clinic, and the athletic facilities for The Manatees. The college's administrative offices are also located on the Bradenton campus.

The Venice center was opened in 1977 by MJC's board of trustees. During this period, the center's functions were funded by the donations of residents living in the surrounding communities, which included Venice, North Port, and Englewood. It was not until 1983 that the college received an appropriation from the Florida Legislature to expand the Venice center into a full-service Venice campus. It was dedicated on March 30, 1985, and the college's name was changed that year to Manatee Community College (MCC). The Venice campus lake is nicknamed Lake Jervey and dedicated to Bill Jervey Jr for his outstanding contributions to the college.

At the beginning of 2003, MCC opened the 5-acre (2.0 ha) Lakewood Ranch campus. The land appropriated for this was donated by the Schroeder-Manatee Ranch. The Lakewood Ranch campus offers credit and non-credit programs of study, as well as technical and workforce development courses. In 2007, the Schroeder-Manatee Ranch donated an additional 5 acres (2.0 ha) to the Lakewood Ranch campus. MCC obtained supplementary funding from the Florida Legislature, which was allocated for the construction of the Medical Technology and Simulation Center.

In September 2008, MCC began the process of becoming a state college under the direction of then-president Lars A. Hafner, and on March 17, 2009, the State Board of Education unanimously approved the college's proposal to offer its first baccalaureate degree. In July of that same year, MCC officially changed its name to State College of Florida, Manatee–Sarasota (SCF) to reflect its new status as a four-year state institution. The first bachelor's degree to be offered at the college was a Bachelor of Science in Nursing (B.S.N.), which started in January 2010. State College of Florida continues to add baccalaureate degree programs to its offerings based on a combination of regional, state, and national need. Several other bachelor's degree programs are now offered at SCF.

In June 2025 the university was placed on Warning status by its educational accreditor, the Southern Association of Colleges and Schools, after the accreditor's board found significant non-compliance with its standards of student achievement.

=== Campus ===
Students can attend classes on campuses located in Bradenton, Venice, and Lakewood Ranch. Students can also visit many business and public-sector sites throughout the community as well as attend online classes. The Bradenton campus is outside the city limits, in the Bayshore Gardens census-designated place.

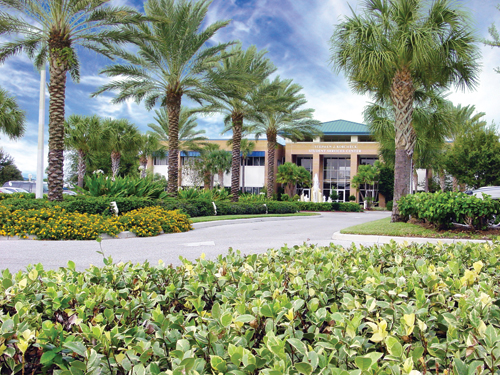
Bradenton campus. Stephen J. Korcheck Student Services Center

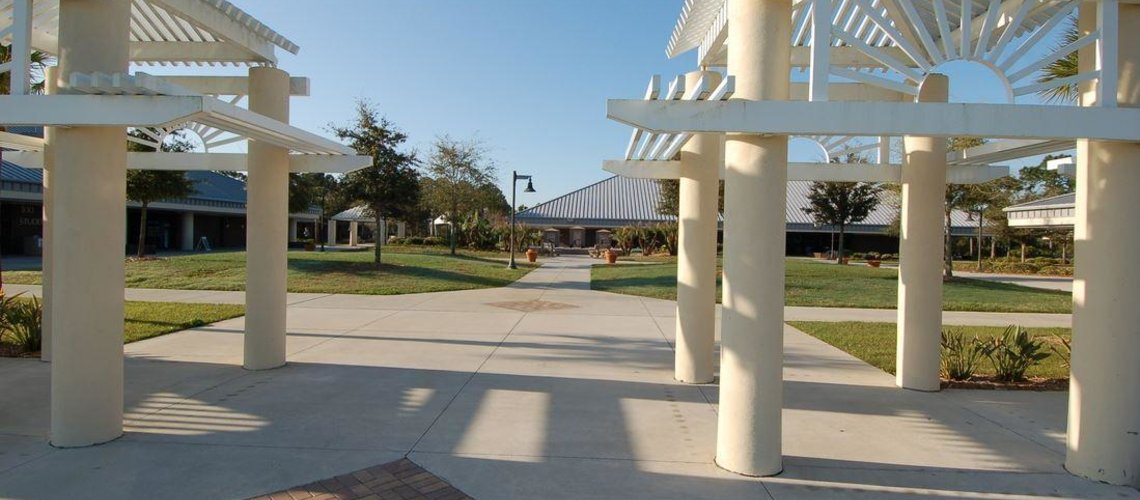
Venice campus

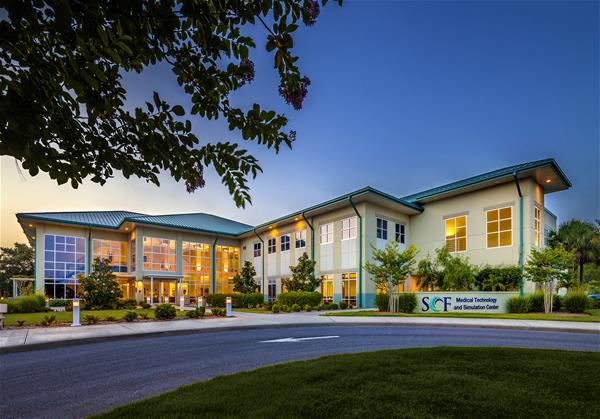
Lakewood Ranch campus. Medical Technology and Simulation Center (MTSC)

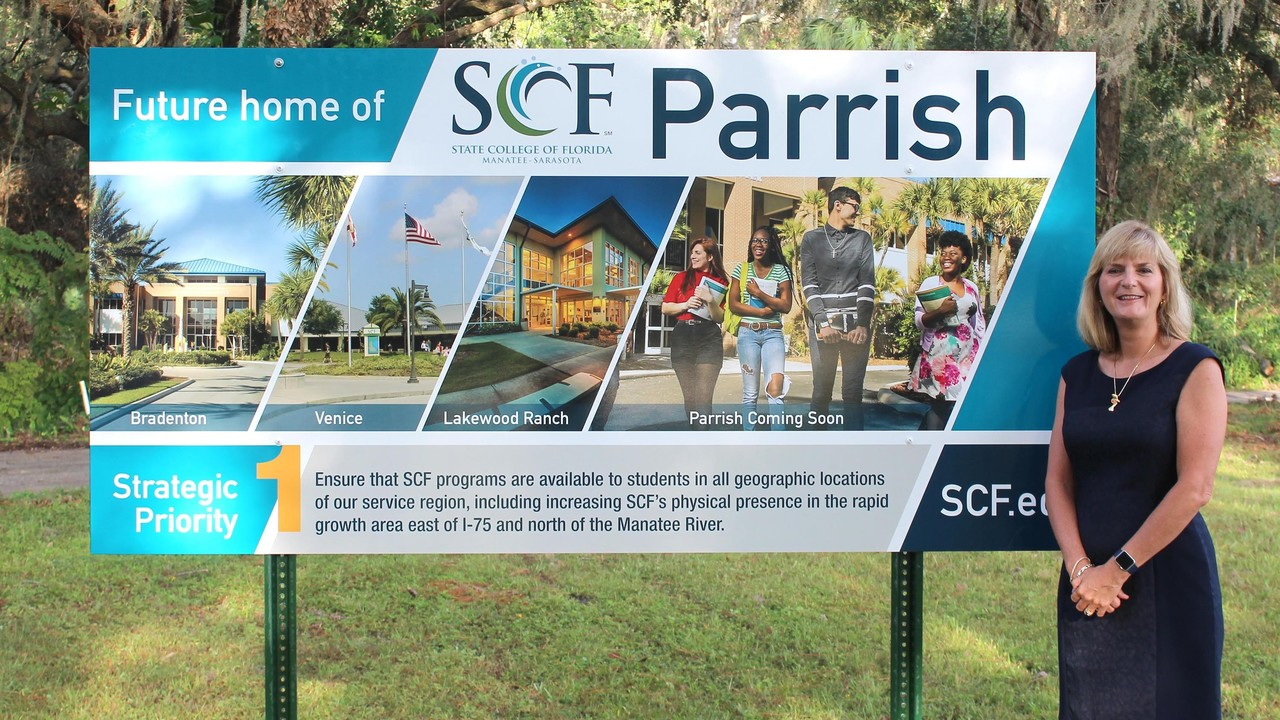
Future Parrish campus with college president Carol Probstfeld.

=== Sustainability ===
State College of Florida has been awarded The Association of Florida College's Campus Sustainability Award. And in 2011, the college was awarded The U.S. Green Building Council's Leadership in Energy and Efficient Design (LEED) Gold certification for the construction of the Medical Technology & Simulation Center on its Lakewood Ranch campus. Maintaining sustainability remains a continuous effort at SCF by integrating environmental, social, and economic goals through design, planning, and operational organization to meet its current needs.

== Administration ==
As a member of the Florida College System, State College of Florida falls under the purview of the State Board of Education. SCF is governed by the Florida Legislature and by a District Board of Trustees, consisting of eight members appointed by the Governor to oversee the college's operations.

Tommy Gregory was inaugurated as the seventh president of the college on February 7, 2025, following the start of his presidential term on July 1, 2024. He succeeded Carol F. Probstfeld who was inaugurated as the sixth president of the State College of Florida on November 8, 2013, after serving as the college's vice president of business and administrative services.

During Probstfeld's term as president, the State College of Florida Foundation launched its first Capital Campaign in 2016 to provide facilities that enhance the student experience. The campaign financed $1 million in technological upgrades for the new Library and Learning Center that opened in February 2018 and includes a $3.5 million Studio for the Performing Arts and a $9.5 million Health and Human Performance Center. Both of which will be built on the Bradenton campus. She also led the college's 2015–2020 Boldly Engaging strategic plan. Shortly afterward, SCF purchased 74 acres (300,000 m^{2}) of land for a new Parrish campus.

== Academics ==
State College of Florida is accredited by the Commission on Colleges of the Southern Association of Colleges and Schools to award associate and baccalaureate degrees. Noncredit education is offered under SCF's Lifelong Learning & Workforce Development programs. More than 50 percent of the college-bound high school students in Manatee and Sarasota counties attend SCF each year, with a current enrollment of over 11,000 students. State College of Florida is among the top 100 producers of associate degrees in the United States.

State College of Florida is also a charter member of the Manufacturing Institute's "M-list," which recognizes schools for excellence in manufacturing education. The Manufacturing Institute is an organization that is dedicated to improving and expanding manufacturing in the United States. SCF was one of eleven Florida College System institutions to be selected, helping Florida lead the nation with the most schools on the list.

State College of Florida's nursing program annually records one of the highest certification rates in the state of Florida, and the physical therapy assistant, occupational therapy assistant, dental hygiene, and radiography programs have a 98% percent licensure pass rate.

SCF's study abroad program allows students the unique opportunity to travel to places outside of the United States. Students can visit places such as London, Oxford, Paris, Amsterdam, and more. The program takes place during the summer months.

=== Libraries ===
State College of Florida has three campus libraries including a large online collection. These locations include Bradenton, Venice, and Lakewood Ranch. The collections include print and electronic books, academic journals, magazines and newspapers, thousands of online research databases, audio books, streaming videos, DVDs, citation tools, music, and periodicals. Group study rooms, computer labs, and wireless printing services are also available. In addition to the on site librarians, students can use digital reference services such as AskALibrarian, where they can chat, email, or text with an SCF librarian.

A new $17.6 million library facility opened in 2018 at the Bradenton location. The facility includes a visualization studio, which has a visual capability of 270 degrees, a 200-seat community room, 3D printers, and a film studio with multiple editing suites, as well as a section of the library into which students may not bring mobile telephones and laptop computers. The mission statement for the college library is as follows, "The SCF Libraries engage students, faculty, staff, and community members in the discovery and creation of knowledge."

=== Research ===
SCF is one of the 25 colleges and universities in the United States to participate in Yale University's Small World Initiative, a project that engages students in real-world research by searching for and identifying antibiotic-producing bacteria in soil and other environments. The college has also partnered with Tufts University to test the prevalence of antibiotic resistance in the environment. Other undergraduate research opportunities are offered to SCF students under the Tampa Bay Bridge to Baccalaureate program (B2B), a collaboration between The State College of Florida, Hillsborough Community College, and St. Petersburg College. The B2B program is funded by the National Science Foundation . The purpose of the B2B program is to increase the number of underrepresented students completing a bachelor's degree in science, technology, engineering, or mathematics (STEM). Under the program, students have the opportunity to participate in research and internships through the college, local businesses, and through other partner universities.

== Partnerships and Community Development ==
The college's Venice campus is home to the Gator Engineering program, a collaboration with the University of Florida. Students can take their math and science courses at SCF and upon successful completion will be granted admission to UF's Herbert Wertheim College of Engineering.

State College of Florida also participates in the FUSE Transfer Program, a partnership with the University of South Florida. The FUSE Program provides a seamless transition from SCF to the USF System. The program also allows for timely completion of both the Associate of Arts (A.A.) and bachelor's degrees.

Previously, the college held dual enrollment classes on the campuses of high schools operated by the School District of Manatee County and Sarasota County Public Schools. In 2018, the college announced that it would only offer dual enrollment classes held on its own campuses or those accessed on the internet.

The Cross College Alliance is a collaboration between the State College of Florida, the University of South Florida, the Ringling College of Art and Design, New College of Florida, and the Ringling Museum of Art. The purpose of the Cross College Alliance (CCA) is to provide a network that expands the learning opportunities for students on the west coast of Florida. The CCA hosts a number of events throughout the year that inspire community building and collaboration.

=== 26 West Center for Advanced Technology and Innovation ===
The 26 West Center for Advanced Technology and Innovation is a collaboration between the State College of Florida, local employers, the Economic Development Corporation of Sarasota County, and the Bradenton Area Economic Development Corporation. The $8 million facility opened in the fall of 2021 on SCF's Bradenton campus and currently houses the brand new coding and IT academy, university partnership center, a video/creative production studio, and the new 26 West Center Technology Business Incubator.

== Student life ==
Collectively, State College of Florida's three campuses have over 30 registered student organizations, including an active Student Government, intramural sports, and a campus ministry. Students can participate in clubs such as Phi Theta Kappa, Model UN, Circle K International, and more.

=== Student government ===
The Bradenton and Venice campuses each have their own independent Student Government Associations. State College of Florida's SGA is divided into three parts consisting of the executive board, the General Council, and the Inter-Club Council. The executive board is composed of the Student Body President, Student Body Vice President, Secretary/Treasurer, and the Inter-Club Council (ICC) President. The Inter-Club Council (ICC) is composed of representatives from each registered club on campus, while the General Council is made up of members of the student body. Executive board elections are held during the spring semester, but General Council members can join as late as the beginning of the fall semester. Members of the SGA Executive Board also serve on the Student Activities Budget Review Committee (SABR), which manages and allocates funds to SCF'S 50+ clubs and organizations. General Council members can serve on the Campus Activities Board (CAB), which is responsible for planning and organizing campus activities throughout the semester such as the annual spring and fall festivals.

=== Brain Bowl ===
The Brain Bowl team at the State College of Florida has achieved state and national recognition for being one of the top quiz bowl programs in the country. In the 2014-2015 competition season, SCF's "Fire Team" compiled a record of 58–2 against other two-year schools, going on to win championships at tournaments such as the 2014 Delta Burke Invitational, 2015 FCSAA West Central Regional, 2015 FCSAA Brain Bowl State Championship, 2015 NAQT South Florida Community College Sectionals, and the 2015 NAQT Community College Championship Tournament. The team was also invited to compete in NAQT's Intercollegiate Championship Tournament (DII), where the team placed 25th with a record of 7–6, notably defeating four-year schools such as UC Berkeley, Duke University, University of Alabama, and Claremont Colleges in the process.

=== Music ===
State College of Florida's music program is home to eleven different musical ensembles. They include The Bradenton Symphony Orchestra, Symphonic band, Chamber choir, Concert choir, Big band, Jazz combo, Guitar ensemble, Keyboard studies, Presidential string quartet, Presidential jazz combo, and the Musical Theatre Ensemble. State College of Florida's music students perform in multiple concerts throughout the semester as well as numerous community and state events such as the FCSAA Winter Music Symposium. Auditions are open to students and the general public. Alumni include singer-songwriter Matt Walden and R&B singer R.LUM.R.

=== Theater ===
Studio 84 Productions, the student theatre and musical theatre company at the State College of Florida does a total of four to five productions per year. Auditions are open to students and to the community. Most theatre graduates have gone on to four-year universities to receive their Bachelor of Arts (B.A.) or Bachelor of Fine Arts (B.F.A.) degrees in Theater and Performing Arts. SCF Theater alumni include American actor Dallas Roberts (The walking Dead), various Broadway performers, and many more.

=== Recreation ===
State College of Florida's Bradenton campus includes a weight room, sand volleyball court, outdoor basketball court, outdoor fitness area, and a reflection pond. Most of the athletic fields, such as the gymnasium and the tennis courts, are open to students when not in use. The Venice campus includes a 0.75-mile (1.21 km) fit trail and nature trail that surrounds the campus lake and includes 10 stations for balanced exercise routines. The State College of Florida Foundation is currently in the process of raising funds for a brand-new Health and Human Performance Center that will be built on the college's Bradenton campus. The 40,348-square-foot (3,748.5 m^{2}) facility will feature a full-size fitness center, training facilities, a state-of-the-art gymnasium, team rooms for The Manatees and for away teams, classrooms, offices, and concession and vending areas.

== Athletics ==
State College of Florida launched its intercollegiate athletics program in 1957 and adopted "The Lancers" as its mascot. When MCC decided to change its name to SCF in 2009, the college adopted a new mascot, as well as changing the college's official colors from blue and yellow, to blue and green.

Today, State College of Florida's athletic teams are known as "The Manatees" and are represented by the mascot Maverick the Manatee. State College of Florida hosts five intercollegiate sports teams. They include: Men's Baseball, Women's Softball, Women’s Beach Volleyball, and Women's Court Volleyball. Women's Cross-Country (Coming Soon). They compete in the Citrus Conference and Sun-Lakes Conference of the Florida College System Activities Association (FCSAA) in NJCAA Region VIII. The State College of Florida Manatees have won numerous regional, state, and conference titles and have made several national championship appearances.

Athletics alumni include MLB players Nick Goody, Josh Lucas, and Reggie McClain.

== Cultural ==
=== The Family Heritage House Museum ===
The Bradenton campus is home to The Family Heritage House Museum, a gallery and research center for the study of African American history and achievements housed in the college's Library and Learning Center. The Annie Lucy Williams Children's Room includes the complete collection of Coretta Scott King Award children's books. Exhibits include a timeline of significant events in African American history, including slavery, fights for freedom, community building and education, the Harlem Renaissance, the Civil Rights Movement, Kwanzaa, and the modern era in South Africa. There are also displays about the Underground Railroad and a collection of African masks. The Admission is free.

=== Neel Performing Arts Center ===
The Samuel R. Neel Performing Arts Center located on SCF's Bradenton campus is an 830-seat auditorium built in 1966. Since then, State College of Florida's Neel Performing Arts Center has been the cultural center of Manatee and Sarasota county and the home of SCF's music program. The Elizabeth M. Eaton Memorial Pipe Organ, a 50-rank, 3-manual instrument built by master craftsman Charles McManis, is situated on the stage of the performing arts center.

=== Howard Studio Theatre ===
The David S. and Anne V. Howard Studio Theatre is a 116-seat performance center built in 2008 on State College of Florida's Bradenton campus. It is the home of Studio 84 Productions, the SCF student theatre company. The Howard Studio Theatre hosts a number of student performances throughout the semester as well as multiple performances by local and professional theatrical groups.

=== Fine Art Gallery ===
The Fine Art Gallery on the SCF Bradenton campus features exhibits made by students and faculty, as well as various installations by local and professional artists. The galleries exhibits embrace critical issues and the connections between art, education, and culture.

== Notable alumni ==
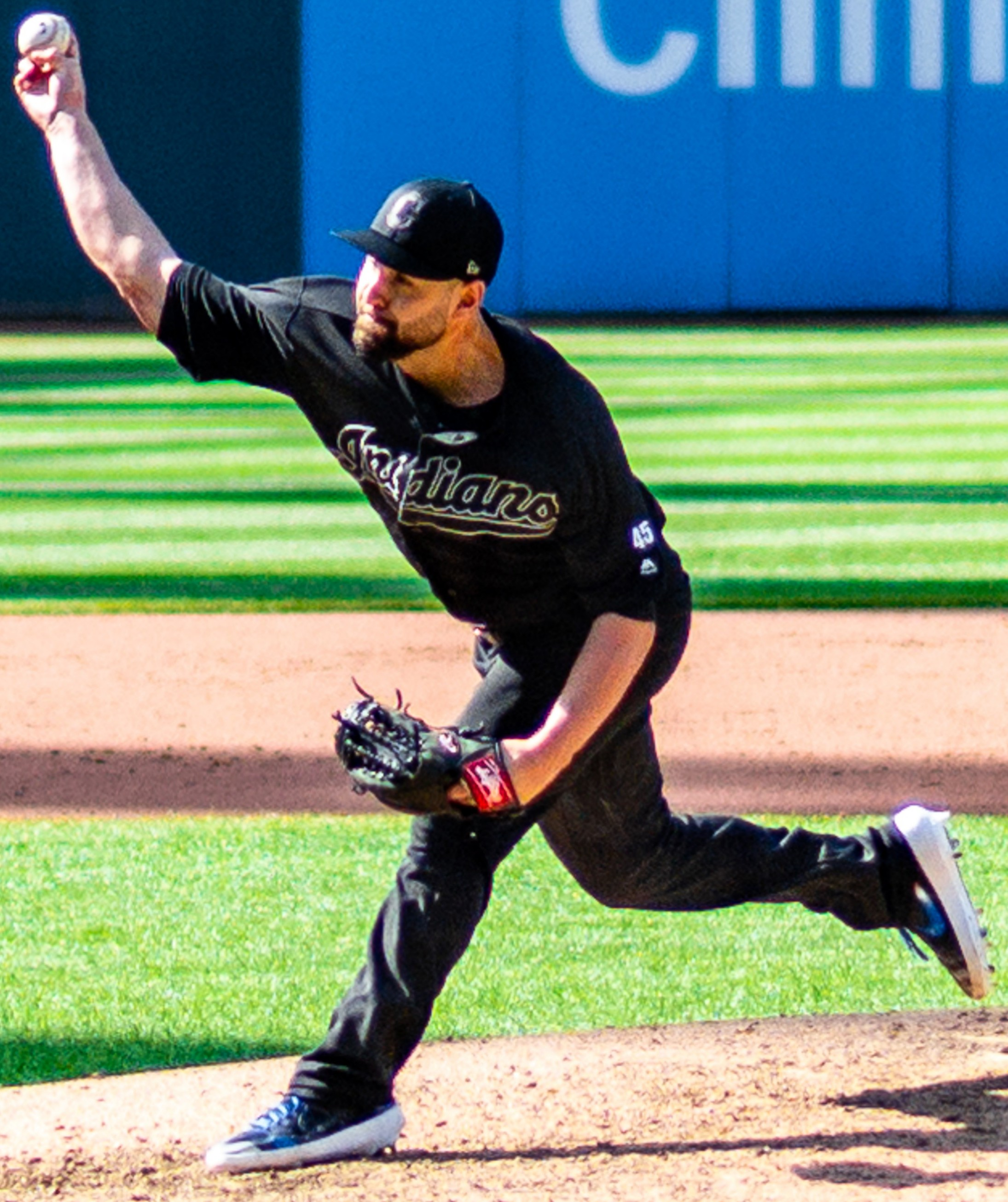
Nick Goody

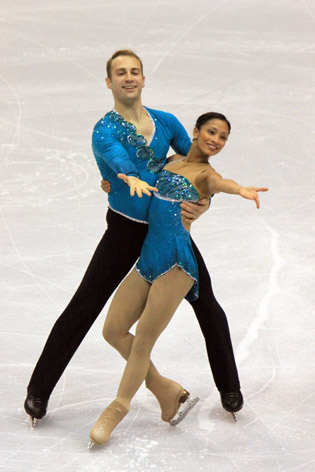
Amanda Evora

State College of Florida alumni include authors, musicians, actors, artist, company founders, state representatives, screenwriters, producers, multiple athletes, and many more.

Alumnus	Notability
Lance Carter	Professional baseball player
Alex Cole	Professional baseball player
Amanda Evora	U.S. Olympic figure skater
Bill Galvano	Member of the Florida House of Representatives and Senate
Nick Goody	MLB player
Matt Hudson	Member of the Florida House of Representatives
Mike Le	Screenwriter, director, and producer
Josh Lucas	Professional baseball player
Reggie McClain	Professional baseball player
Rob McKittrick	Filmmaker, screenwriter, director
Dallas Roberts	Actor
R.LUM.R	R&B singer

== Notable faculty ==
Faculty member	Title	Notability
Pete Carney	Director of Jazz Studies	Author, Composer, Recording artist
Dave Moates	Assistant Baseball coach	Former professional baseball player
Don Robinson	Baseball Pitching coach	Former professional baseball player
Wyatt Rainey Blassingame	Creative writing instructor	Author

== See also ==
- State College of Florida Collegiate School - College preparatory school on the SCF Bradenton and Venice campuses; based on a Swedish model
- Robert C. Wynn Baseball Field - Home of The Manatees Baseball team
- Florida College System - A system of 28 public community colleges and state colleges in the U.S. state of Florida
