= Matt Walden =

American singer (born 1994)

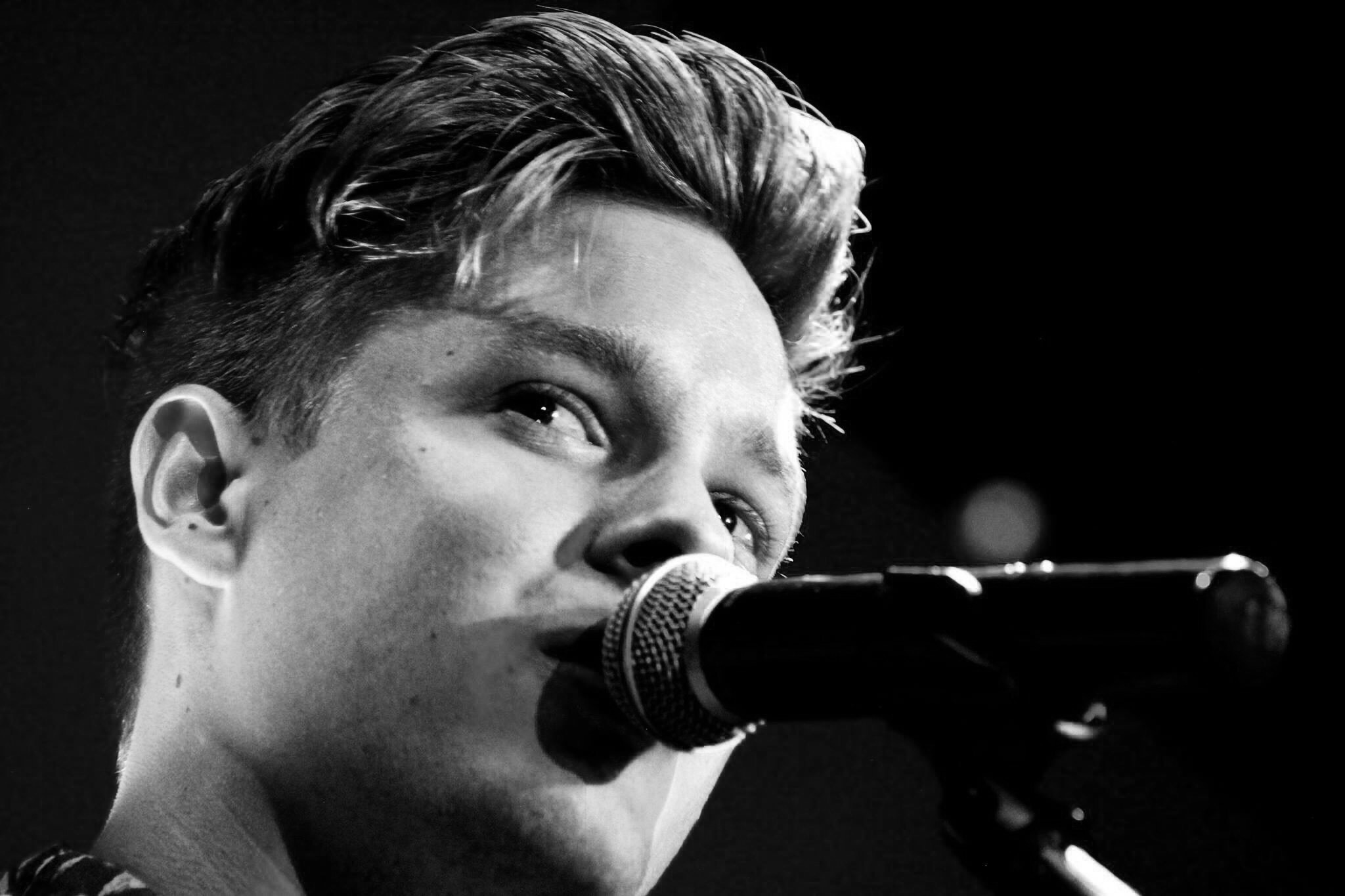
- Matt Walden, singer-songwriter, Bradenton, Fla.

Background
- Birth name: Matthew James Walden
- Born: December 28, 1994 (age 31)
- Genres: singer-songwriter, acoustic, pop, folk, hip hop
- Instruments: Piano, guitar, drums, bass
- Years active: 2014–present
- Website: MattWalden.com

Matthew James Walden (born December 28, 1994) is a singer-songwriter from Bradenton, Florida. His first original single, Flipped the Script, was released on May 16, 2015, and charted at No. 38 on the iTunes Singer-Songwriter chart. His first EP, Life, was released July 7, 2015, and on its first day of pre-sales, hit No. 7 on the iTunes Singer-Songwriter Top Album chart. Walden released his first full-length album, Walden., on May 20, 2016, and reached No. 25 on the iTunes Singer-Songwriter Top Album chart. Walden's single "With You" was released on April 27, 2017, and has more than 229,000 plays on Spotify.

== Early life ==
Walden was born in Bradenton, Florida, to Kimberly Baran Thomas, a personal trainer, and James Cornelius Walden, a roofing consultant and appraiser. They divorced in 2002, and Walden lived with his mother and younger brother, Christopher, in Bradenton. Walden attended Palma Sola Elementary School, Martha B. King Middle School and Manatee High School, graduating in 2013. He attended State College of Florida, Manatee-Sarasota for two years.

At age 6, his mother enrolled him in piano lessons, which he continued for 10 years. Early performances included recitals of Beethoven and Bach classical works, which he played in local churches, in front of attentive audiences. At 9 years old, Walden took a few months of guitar lessons to learn the basics and a few more lessons at age 15. In high school, he learned more about playing the guitar by watching YouTube videos and learned how to write songs by breaking down the patterns of songs by verse, chorus and bridge. One of his first songs, Just Another Story, was about a girl unaware of a boy's affections.

Walden considers Ed Sheeran, Damien Rice, All Time Low and The Maine as his major musical influences.

Musician Billy Rice, known for playing with Toby Keith and John Michael Montgomery, gave Walden his first acoustic guitar in 2010 and encouraged him to take up singing. Through Rice, Walden met Del Couch, who founded the Del Couch Music Education Foundation in 2010, now housed in the Manatee School for the Arts in Palmetto, Florida. Walden became a member of the foundation in 2010 along with fellow Bradenton singer-songwriter Sam Woolf, who finished fifth in the 2014 season of American Idol.

Matt Walden performs at the Bradenton Riverwalk Regatta on Feb 7, 2015

In 2010, as a freshman in high school, Walden won the GTE Federal Credit Union Suite Caroline Strawberry Jam talent contest and performed at the Strawberry Festival with singer-songwriter and Sony/ATV recording artist Caroline Kole.

With Couch's foundation, Walden played many performances, such as the Welcome Home concert for Sam Woolf, Bradenton Riverwalk Regatta and 2015 Lakewood Ranch WinterFest.

== Music career, 2014 to present ==
In 2014, Walden began performing at local venues and shows such as Playlist Live in Orlando.

In March 2015, Walden started booking live music gigs throughout Bradenton at Woody's River Roo and Tarpon Point Grill & Tiki Bar. He introduced the loop pedal to his performances, further defining his personal sound.

Recording and iTunes Charts: On May 16, 2015, Walden's first original single, Flipped the Script, was released on iTunes. In the days prior, during pre-order sales, the single charted at #38 on the iTunes Singer-Songwriter Chart. Walden recorded the song with producer Raven Chapman at the Del Couch Music Education Foundation studio. Walden posted a live studio video of the song on his YouTube channel on June 17, 2015.

On July 7, 2015, Walden's five-song EP, "Life", was released on iTunes, and on the first day of pre-orders, it reached No. 7 on the iTunes Singer-songwriter Album chart. The songs included on the EP include Flipped the Script, Dreams, Be Someone, I Wanna and Nowhere to Be Found.

On November 27, 2015, Walden's single Stay the Hell Away From Me, debuted on iTunes and on pre-order it reached No. 79 on the iTunes Singer-songwriter Top Song chart. On April 15, 2016, Walden's single Instant Love, debuted on iTunes and reached No. 58 on the iTunes Singer-songwriter Top Song chart.

Walden released his first full-length album, "Walden.", on May 20, 2016, and reached No. 25 on the iTunes Singer-Songwriter Top Album chart.

Walden's EP "Alive" was released in 2017 and climbed to the top 50 on the iTunes Singer-Songwriter Top Album chart.

Walden's single "With You" was released on April 27, 2017, and has more than 229,000 plays on Spotify to date.

Touring 2015–present: Walden temporarily moved to Naples, Fla., in 2015 to pursue a marketing degree at Florida SouthWestern State College. His began his first tour, The Coffeeshop (But Not Really) Tour in June 2016, included stops in Florida, Georgia, Alabama, Ohio, Maryland and New York City He toured at various Florida venues in 2016 and 2017, including the Hometown Show in October 2016 in Bradenton, Fla., and the EP release party in Naples on May 20, 2017, which gained him media coverage in the Naples Daily News. Throughout the second half of 2017, Walden performed at multiple PressPlay tours around the United States.

== Discography ==
- "Life" (2015), ep
- "Walden." (2016), album
- "Alive" (2017) ep

== 2014–present performances ==
- 2014 Playlist Live, Orlando
- IMG Welcome Home
- Riverwalk Regatta, Bradenton
- WinterFest, Lakewood Ranch
- August 2015, Orpheum, Tampa
- December 2015, Sam Woolf & Friends Concert, Brandenton, Fla.
- April 2016 De Soto Seafood Festival
- April 2016 Playlist Live, Orlando
- June 2016 The Coffeeshop (But Not Really) Tour with stops in Florida, Georgia, Ohio, Alabama, Maryland and New York City
- October 2016 The Hometown Show, Bradenton, Fla.
- October 2016 All American High School Film Festival, New York City
- December 2016 Sugar Shack Session, Bonita Springs, Fla.
- April 2017 Playlist Live, Orlando
- October 2017 The Healing Session Concert, Bonita Springs, Fla.
- 2017 PressPlay performances throughout the United States
- February 2018 FIU Uproar Festival, Miami
- February 2018 Where's Walden Tour, Florida
- Summer Hometown Tour 2019, Florida
- Virgin Voyages Scarlet Lady 2023, Port of Miami
