= Del Couch Music Education Foundation =

Nonprofit organization in Palmetto, Florida, US

Background
- Type: Non-profit organization
- Industry: Music Education
- Founded: 2010
- Instruction: Music production and recording
- Website: delcouchmusicfoundation.org

The Del Couch Music Education Foundation offers children free access to music education, recording equipment and mentorship. The foundation is located inside the Manatee School for the Arts in Palmetto, Florida, where the program founder and director Del Couch conducts four levels of classroom training in music recording and production and providing performance opportunities through events and mentorships. Alumni of the program include 2014 fifth-place American Idol finalist, Sam Woolf, and singer-songwriter recording artist Matt Walden, Carolina Opry star Colton Cason, Christian artist/singer songwriter Taylor Zebracki, Andy Pursell, who recently was signed as a national Salt Life artist, David Smash (aka Dovadas)who was from Lithuania, Couch produced his first US CD and he went on to become a major You Tube personality, Trevor Bystrom. Mario Martinez, aka "The Lazy Menace", Isabella Bank and others. The foundation's head intern, Maguire Fraatz, a senior at MSA, produced the first CD for "Penny Fountain" an alternative rock band consisting of Tony Massaro-Koon (guitar) Xavier Wilkinson (bass/vocals) & Joel Lopez (drums) the band recently opened for national act "We The Kings" at the Bradenton Area Regatta, and performed on the upcoming realty tv show "No Covers". Couch has produced the music the Bradenton Area Regatta for 5 years. Couch has also toured with Jeff Cook (guitarist for Alabama) & The Allstar Band, and recorded on Rick Derringer's "Free Ride " smooth jazz CD. Couch has worked with actresses Audrey Landers (Dallas) and Jane Seymour (James Bond movies, Dr Quinn) and her son. Couch also produced the popular Winterfest concerts drawing over 20,000 fans listening to national acts and featured foundation students throughout the day long events.

== History ==
Del Couch began playing the trumpet in high school and formed the school's award-winning brass band "The Mantico Brass", which was recognized by Herb Alpert of the Tijuana Brass and was later signed by Christine McGuire of the McGuire Sisters to open her nightclub shows. Couch was drafted while attending college and auditioned for the United States Air Force Band, which he was accepted into and played with for three-and-a-half years, playing for President Richard Nixon at various events and supporting the 1st Tactical Fighter Wing, Strike Command, and others at military events and performing "taps"at military funerals. Couch continues his dedication to veterans performing taps over 200 times as a civilian musician.

After college, Couch took a break from music to raise a family and build a real estate career. After a successful real estate career as a Real Estate Broker/owner, he rekindled his love of music and began a successful career with the band "Shaman" that performed upwards of 200 corporate events a year at events around the Southeast. Couch also performed with Billy Rice Band during this period. Couch has performed with and produced concerts with national artists including The Doobie Brothers, Kanas, Atlanta Rhythm Section, Gary Sinise and The Lt. Dan Band, David Lee Murphy, Edgar Winter, Alabama, Marty Balin (Jefferson Airplane and others. Couch also wrote the anthem for “The Modern Pentathlon“ an Olympic event, student Kaitlin Folsum wrote the lyrics and the song was featured at the opening ceremonies for the Modern Pentathlon.

In the 1990s, he decided to go back into music production and earned a master's degree in music production from the Berklee College of Music in 2006. He developed a professional music studio in his home, and began recording. A neighbor's gardener asked if Couch could help his nephew, a young Chicano rapper, The Lazy Menace, Mario Martinez, and Couch produced the boy's CD, which eventually sold 140,000 copies and led the rapper to be signed by a recording company in Los Angeles. It was then that Couch decided to offer free production services to children.

In 2012, Manatee School for the Arts in Palmetto, Florida, agreed to allow Couch to move his studio onto the school grounds and provide classes for the students who attend the school. The studio also produces professional CDs for students and show production CDs for the school. The foundation holds over 500 music software licenses and utilizes Pro Tools Ultimate for its main recording software, Pro Logic, Fl Studios and other software is also taught in the studio. Couch helped develop MSA commercial music program, where bands are formed, writing songs, and performing at local and national events.

== Curriculum Offered ==
As part of the Manatee School for the Arts curriculum, the foundation provides four levels of recording and production classes, including two advanced levels of mixing and mastering. The foundation has partnered with St. Petersburg College to allow students to achieve an associate of arts degree in recording arts and provides internships to selected students in production, recording, and live sound mixing. The students can also earn Avid Certifications in Pro Tools. The foundation also mentors students in the performance side of music and provides free lessons for students in voice, guitar, piano, brass, and strings and music career advice. All foundation services are offered to students free of charge. Classic analog preamps, compressors and an extensive classic microphone collection is featured and available to students to use in their productions. Film scoring is also taught and 15yr old student, Isabella Bank, scored a film for the Berlin International Film Scoring competition and finished in the top five . Selected students are offered scholarships to summer music camps at Berklee College of Music in Boston.

== Student Opportunities ==
Couch's students are often featured performers at various annual events, such as Lakewood Ranch WinterFest, De Soto Heritage Festival*, The Taste of Manatee and Bradenton Riverfront Regatta. They often perform before headlining acts such as the Doobie Brothers and other national acts. Couch's agreement with Manatee School for the Arts allows around-the-clock access for students to use the foundation's studio. Singer-songwriter Matt Walden and producer 17-year-old Raven Chapman produced Walden's iTunes-charting first single, Flipped the Script, as well as his five-song EP, Life, which charted No. 7 on iTunes’ singer-songwriter album chart.

Couch also recorded Colton Cason, who later secured a job as a full-time performer at the Carolina Opry in Myrtle Beach. Couch and Cason also recorded an original song "Breathe" for the domestic violence documentary, "A Way Out" and had a song featured in a full-length movie "The Investigator" produced by Ray Romano (Everybody Loves Raymond) and his brother.

Other notable student recordings include demo tapes for American Idol top 5 Sam Woolf, Nashville singer-songwriter Eric Von, musician Trevor Bystrom, Tony Tyler of Come Back Alice and David Smash. The foundation has its own label and works with major producers in LA, New York, Boston, and Nashville.

== Notable people ==
Mentors: Grammy-winning producer and guitarist Rick Derringer and his wife Jenda Derringer, Alabama Music Hall of Fame inductee George Wallace, Jr., Berklee College of Music instructor Dave Franz, musician Billy Rice, Super Bowl champion and singer Henry Lawrence, neuroscientist Dr. Jessica Couch, Dr. Erol Oszever (classical guitar), Soprano Jenny Kim-Godfrey (Opera singer), Robert Lischetti (vocalist), and Saul and Laura Fineman (communications and social media).

Foundation alumni: Sam Woolf, Matt Walden, David Smash, Colton Cason, Eric Von, Trevor Bystrom, Tony Tyler, Mario Martinez.

== Honors and awards ==
- Everyday Hero, Bay News 9
- Bradenton Arts Special Achievement Award 9
- Berklee College of Music Ambassador

‘Community Arts Champion” Awarded by the Manatee/Sarasota Arts Council in 2020 as recognition for his contributions to the Performing Arts. Nominated for Grammy Awards- Educator of the year
