= Raymond Woodie Jr. =

American football player and coach (born 1973)

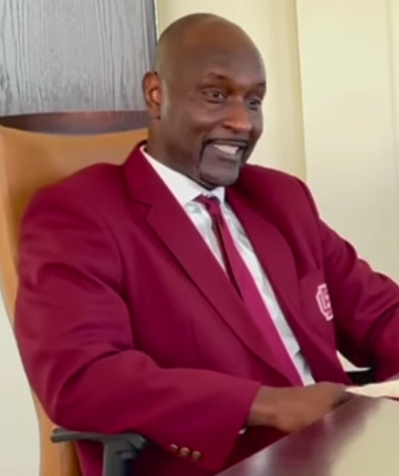
- Woodie with Bethune–Cookman in 2023

Biographical details
- Born: November 2, 1973 (age 53); Palmetto, Florida, U.S.

Playing career
- 1992–1995: Bethune–Cookman
- 1996: BC Lions
- Positions: Linebacker, safety

Coaching career (HC unless noted)
- 1996: Bayshore HS (FL) (DC)
- 1997–2006: Bayshore HS (FL)
- 2007–2009: Palmetto HS (FL)
- 2010–2011: Western Kentucky (DE)
- 2012: Western Kentucky (LB)
- 2013–2014: South Florida (LB)
- 2015: South Florida (AHC/LB)
- 2016: South Florida (AHC/DC)
- 2017: Oregon (ST/OLB)
- 2018–2019: Florida State (LB)
- 2020: Florida Atlantic (OLB)
- 2021–2022: Florida Atlantic (AHC/ST/OLB)
- 2023–2026: Bethune–Cookman

Head coaching record
- Overall: 16–30 (college); 68–69 (high school)

Accomplishments and honors

Awards
- 2× First Team All-MEAC (1994–1995); 2× NCAA Division I-AA All-American (1994–1995)

Raymond Woodie Jr. (born November 2, 1973) is an American college football coach. He was most recently the head football coach for Bethune–Cookman University, a position he held from 2023 until 2026. He played college football for Bethune–Cookman before playing professionally for the BC Lions of the Canadian Football League (CFL). He also coached for Bayshore High School, Palmetto High School, Western Kentucky, South Florida, Oregon, Florida State, and Florida Atlantic.

== Playing career ==
Woodie grew up in Palmetto, Florida, and played high school football for Palmetto High School.

=== College career ===
Woodie played college football for Bethune–Cookman. With the Wildcats he played as a linebacker and safety. He earned All-MEAC honors and all Division I-AA honors in his junior and senior seasons.

=== Professional career ===
In 1996, Woodie signed with the BC Lions of the Canadian Football League (CFL). He suffered a career-ending ankle injury with the team.

== Coaching career ==
=== High school coaching ===
Following Woodie's stint in the CFL he joined Bayshore High School as the team's defensive coordinator in 1996. The following season in 1997 he was promoted to the school's head coach, and became the youngest head coach in Florida at the age of 23. In ten seasons with the school he led the Bruins to seven playoff appearances.

In 2007, Woodie returned to his alma mater, Palmetto High School, to be their head coach. In 2008 he led the team to a district title.

=== Early college coaching ===
After thirteen years of coaching high school football, Woodie joined Western Kentucky as their defensive ends coach. In 2012, he was promoted to linebackers coach.

In 2015, Woodie was hired by South Florida to be their linebackers coach. After two seasons he also earned the role of assistant head coach alongside being the linebackers coach. In 2016, he was promoted to defensive coordinator.

In 2017, Woodie joined Oregon as the team's special teams coordinator and outside linebackers coach.

Following one season with the Ducks, Woodie returned to the state of Florida, this time with Florida State as their linebackers coach.

After two seasons with Florida State, Woodie joined Florida Atlantic as the team's outside linebackers coach. He was promoted to special teams coordinator, assistant head coach, and outside linebackers coach for the 2021 season.

=== Bethune–Cookman ===
On February 5, 2023, Woodie returned to Bethune–Cookman to be the school's next head coach after the team failed to agree on a contract with Ed Reed.

== Personal life ==
Woodie's son, Raymond Woodie III, is a defensive back for Bethune–Cookman.

== Head coaching record ==
=== College ===
Year	Team	Overall	Conference	Standing	Bowl/playoffs
Bethune–Cookman Wildcats (Southwestern Athletic Conference) (2023–present)
2023	Bethune–Cookman	3–8	2–6	5th (East)	
2024	Bethune–Cookman	2–10	2–6	5th (East)	
2025	Bethune–Cookman	6–6	5–3	3rd (East)	
2026	Bethune–Cookman	5–6 (Note: Bethune–Cookman fired Woodie with 1 game remaining.)	3–5	T–4th (East)	
Bethune–Cookman:		16–30	12–20		
Total:		16–30			

=== High school ===
Year	Team	Overall	Conference	Standing	Bowl/playoffs
Bayshore Bruins () (1997–2006)
1997	Bayshore	5–6			
1998	Bayshore	6–4			
1999	Bayshore	2–8			
2000	Bayshore	5–6			
2001	Bayshore	4–6			
2002	Bayshore	3–7			
2003	Bayshore	10–2			
2004	Bayshore	4–6	1–1	2nd	
2005	Bayshore	5–6	4–1	2nd	
2006	Bayshore	2–7	1–4	5th	
Bayshore:		46–58			
Palmetto Tigers () (2007–2009)
2007	Palmetto	9–3	3–1	2nd	
2008	Palmetto	8–3	4–0	1st	
2009	Palmetto	5–5	1–2	3rd	
Palmetto:		22–11	8–3		
Total:		68–69			
National championship Conference title Conference division title or championship game berth
