= Bayshore Gardens, Florida =

- Census-designated place
- Location in Manatee County and the state of Florida
- Coordinates: 27°27′55″N 82°41′46″W
- Country: United States
- State: Florida
- County: Manatee

Area
  - Total: 3.57 sq mi (9.24 km^{2})
  - Land: 3.51 sq mi (9.09 km^{2})
  - Water: 0.058 sq mi (0.15 km^{2})
- Elevation: 0 ft (0 m)

Population (2020)
  - Total: 19,904
  - Density: 5,670.5/sq mi (2,189.38/km^{2})
- Time zone: UTC-5 (Eastern (EST))
  - Summer (DST): UTC-4 (EDT)
- ZIP code: 34207 (Bradenton)
- Area code: 941
- FIPS code: 12-04350
- GNIS feature ID: 2403908

Bayshore Gardens is a census-designated place (CDP) and planned community in Manatee County, Florida, United States. The population was 19,904 at the 2020 census, up from 16,323 in 2010. It is part of the North Port-Bradenton-Sarasota, Florida Metropolitan Statistical Area.

== History ==
In 1955, a New York syndicate led by developer Sydney R. Newman purchased the area now known as Bayshore Gardens on the west side of U.S. 41 along the eastern shore of Sarasota Bay, just north of the Sarasota/Manatee county line, and platted an area between what was dubbed Bayshore Gardens Parkway running from U.S. 41 to 26th Street West and Sarasota Bay that would become Bayshore Gardens. The property was purchased for about 2 million dollars, making it the most expensive land purchase in the area since the 1920s. The 3,200-acre (1,300 ha) area, once fields for growing tomatoes, would include recreation areas and a marina, schools, churches, shopping centers and medical facilities as well as homes in the popular style of that time, now called mid-century modern.

By its grand opening in 1956, four model homes were built and seven available designs had been created for future residents to pick from, including the Seagrape, the Gladiola, and the most popular, the Bird of Paradise. Prices ranged from $8,000 to $15,000 for a home with a lot, and lower rates for veterans were advertised. The first home in Bayshore Gardens was sold in July 1956 to Jennie and Samuel Gibson in the Hibiscus style.

By April 1958, the neighborhood had 400 homes, all of which were designed by Bradenton architect Sidney Wilkinson and built by Richard Morton's Bayshore Gardens Inc. The neighborhood was opened up that year to other developers and home builders, including Richmond Homes and Arrow Home Builders. Designs added by Richmond Homes included the Cayman, Expo, Lenfield, Something Special, Tarlton, and Windward. Arrow Home Builders were known for adding larger custom homes on the Bayshore Gardens waterfront

In November 1959, Bayshore Gardens Shopping Center held a grand opening with stores that included Publix, a beauty shop, barbershop, hardware store, shoe repair, and clothing stores. The neighborhood grew rapidly, and by 1960 it was the largest voting precinct in the county. That year, the shopping center was expanded to add more stores and a movie theater.

== Historical preservation ==
In 2014, students from the University of Florida and community members began inventorying the mid-century homes in the neighborhood as part of a project to have Bayshore Gardens designated as the state's largest and most historically significant collection of mid-century residential architecture. Bayshore Gardens is still in the process of gaining a historical designation from the State of Florida.

== Geography ==
According to the United States Census Bureau, the CDP has a total area of 3.6 square miles (9.3 km^{2}), of which 0.06 square miles (0.16 km^{2}), or 1.65%, are water. The community is bordered to the southwest by Sarasota Bay, to the southeast by Bowlees Creek and the community of Whitfield, and to the north by South Bradenton.

== Demographics ==
Historical population
Census	Pop.	Note	%±
1990	17,062		—
2000	17,350		1.7%
2010	16,323		−5.9%
2020	19,904		21.9%
U.S. Decennial Census

=== 2020 census ===
As of the 2020 census, Bayshore Gardens had a population of 19,904. The median age was 46.5 years. 19.0% of residents were under the age of 18 and 26.9% of residents were 65 years of age or older. For every 100 females there were 91.7 males, and for every 100 females age 18 and over there were 90.1 males age 18 and over.

100.0% of residents lived in urban areas, while 0.0% lived in rural areas.

There were 8,876 households in Bayshore Gardens, of which 21.3% had children under the age of 18 living in them. Of all households, 34.2% were married-couple households, 23.3% were households with a male householder and no spouse or partner present, and 33.9% were households with a female householder and no spouse or partner present. About 38.1% of all households were made up of individuals and 22.2% had someone living alone who was 65 years of age or older.

There were 10,632 housing units, of which 16.5% were vacant. The homeowner vacancy rate was 2.4% and the rental vacancy rate was 9.1%.

Racial composition as of the 2020 census
Race	Number	Percent
White	12,747	64.0%
Black or African American	1,758	8.8%
American Indian and Alaska Native	132	0.7%
Asian	222	1.1%
Native Hawaiian and Other Pacific Islander	14	0.1%
Some other race	2,373	11.9%
Two or more races	2,658	13.4%
Hispanic or Latino (of any race)	5,668	28.5%

=== 2000 census ===
As of the census of 2000, there were 17,350 people, 8,342 households, and 4,588 families residing in the CDP. The population density was 4,874.7 inhabitants per square mile (1,882.1/km^{2}). There were 10,121 housing units at an average density of 2,843.6 per square mile (1,097.9/km^{2}). The racial makeup of the CDP was 89.87% White, 3.98% African American, 0.38% Native American, 1.25% Asian, 0.10% Pacific Islander, 2.34% from other races, and 2.09% from two or more races. Hispanic or Latino of any race were 8.22% of the population.

There were 8,342 households, out of which 19.0% had children under the age of 18 living with them, 41.0% were married couples living together, 9.7% had a female householder with no husband present, and 45.0% were non-families. 38.2% of all households were made up of individuals, and 22.5% had someone living alone who was 65 years of age or older. The average household size was 2.07 and the average family size was 2.69.

In the CDP, the population was spread out, with 17.9% under the age of 18, 7.6% from 18 to 24, 25.1% from 25 to 44, 20.1% from 45 to 64, and 29.3% who were 65 years of age or older. The median age was 44 years. For every 100 females, there were 87.6 males. For every 100 females age 18 and over, there were 84.6 males.

The median income for a household in the CDP was $30,159, and the median income for a family was $37,294. Males had a median income of $28,614 versus $22,656 for females. The per capita income for the CDP was $18,150. About 7.5% of families and 10.1% of the population were below the poverty line, including 15.5% of those under age 18 and 8.5% of those age 65 or over.

== Education ==
The School District of Manatee County provides K-12 public education in Manatee County.

The State College of Florida, Manatee-Sarasota's (SCF) main campus is located in Bayshore Gardens. The 100-acre campus includes The Family Heritage House Museum, Neel Performing Arts Center, and The Howard Studio Theatre. The college's athletic facilities as well as the administrative offices are also located on the Bradenton campus.

State College of Florida Collegiate School has a campus on the SCF Bradenton campus.
