= Fabian Washington =

American football player (born 1983)

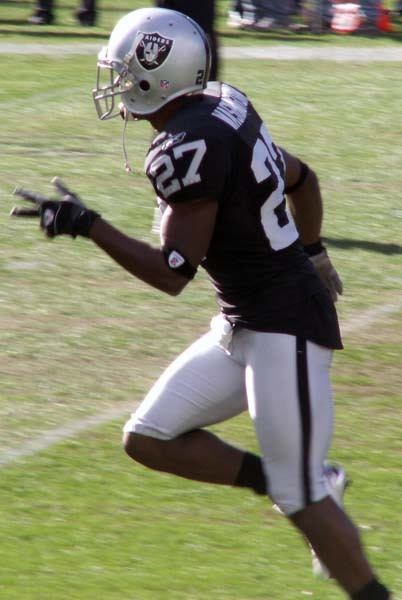
- Washington with the Oakland Raiders in 2007

No. 27, 31, 34
- Position: Cornerback

Personal information
- Born: June 9, 1983 (age 43); Bradenton, Florida, U.S.
- Listed height: 5 ft 11 in (1.80 m)
- Listed weight: 175 lb (79 kg)

Career information
- High school: Bayshore (Bradenton)
- College: Nebraska (2002–2004)
- NFL draft: 2005: 1st round, 23rd overall pick

Career history
- Oakland Raiders (2005–2007); Baltimore Ravens (2008–2010); New Orleans Saints (2011)

Awards and highlights
- 3× All-Big 12 (2002–2004)

Career NFL statistics
- Total tackles: 221
- Forced fumbles: 1
- Fumble recoveries: 1
- Pass deflections: 57
- Interceptions: 6
- Stats at Pro Football Reference

Fabian Washington (born June 9, 1983) is an American former professional football player who was a cornerback in the National Football League (NFL). He played college football for the Nebraska Cornhuskers and was selected by the Oakland Raiders 23rd overall in the 2005 NFL draft. Washington also played with the Baltimore Ravens.

== Early life ==
Fabian Washington attended Bayshore High School in Bradenton, Florida and was a letterman in football, basketball, and track. In football, he was a four-year starter at cornerback, a two-year starter at wide receiver, and a backup quarterback. As a junior, he posted three interceptions, and twelve pass deflections. As a senior, he posted four interceptions, 60 tackles, and fourteen pass deflections. He ran a 4.29 in the 40-yard dash as a senior. In track, he placed third at the Florida State Meet on the 100 meter dash as a junior, despite running the fastest time in the preliminaries. Next year he was the district champion of the 100 meter dash as a senior.

== College career ==
He went on to start for three years at cornerback at the University of Nebraska–Lincoln before leaving early to become a first round NFL draft selection of the Oakland Raiders (pick 23 in 2005). Fabian was an All-Big 12 selection in each of his three seasons at the University of Nebraska. Fabian recorded 145 career tackles (97 solos) with seven stops for losses of 15 yards, three forced fumbles and two fumble recoveries. He also intercepted 11 passes and broke up another 38 in his three-year career, placing him fourth in Nebraska history in both categories. Fabian was known for starting every game at left cornerback for the Huskers as a junior in 2004. Fabian was also named second-team All-Big 12 by the Austin American-Statesman and earned third-team honors from the league's coaches. Fabian recorded three interceptions, gaining 23 yards in returns, and broke up 15 passes. He also recorded 41 tackles (27 solos), including three tackles behind the line for minus-seven yards. Fabian was selected in third-team All-Big 12 by the league's coaches as a sophomore in 2003. He intercepted four passes, which he returned for 14 yards, and batted down 10 others...Registered a career-high 55 tackles (36 solos), had three tackles behind the line for minus-six yards, forced a fumble and recovered another, and recorded two QB pressures. As a freshman, he was selected Freshman All-American second-team and first-team All-Big 12 selection by The Sporting News in 2002. He set a Nebraska freshman record with 13 pass deflections and tied another freshman mark with four interceptions. Fabian intercepted a pass on his first play as a Husker against Arizona State and returned it 29 yards for a touchdown. He finished the year with 49 tackles (34 solos), two forced fumbles, a fumble recovery, and one tackle for a two-yard loss. Fabian majored in sociology.

== Professional career ==
Pre-draft measurables
Height	Weight	Arm length	Hand span	40-yard dash	10-yard split	20-yard split	20-yard shuttle	Vertical jump	Broad jump	Bench press
5 ft 10 1/2 in (1.79 m)	188 lb (85 kg)	30 1/4 in (0.77 m)	10 1/8 in (0.26 m)	4.29 s	1.50 s	2.43 s	3.91 s	41.5 in (1.05 m)	10 ft 9 in (3.28 m)	18 reps
All values from NFL Combine, no cones due to hamstring injury.

=== Oakland Raiders ===
Washington was drafted in the first round by the Oakland Raiders with the 23rd overall pick in the 2005 NFL draft after his draft stock rose after recording a time of 4.29 sec in the 40-yard dash at the 2005 NFL Combine.

During his rookie year he played all 16 games with 11 starts and recorded 40 tackles. In his second season with the Raiders, Washington started in all 14 games he played in and had 43 tackles and four interceptions. During his third season with the Raiders in 2007 he played in 15 games with three starts, recording 40 tackles, and one interception. After the season, the Raiders started shopping him around after acquiring DeAngelo Hall. It was later revealed that Washington himself also requested to be traded, stating, "I would have traded myself."

=== Baltimore Ravens ===
On April 26, 2008, Washington was traded to the Baltimore Ravens for a fourth round pick during the 2008 NFL draft. Washington, who was able to wear #27 (his jersey number during his time with the Raiders), decided to wear #31. During college, Washington wore #3. In his first preseason appearance with the team he recorded two interceptions. Samari Rolle did not play.

On October 26, in a game against his former team (the Raiders), Washington recorded a tackle on TE Zach Miller after a catch.

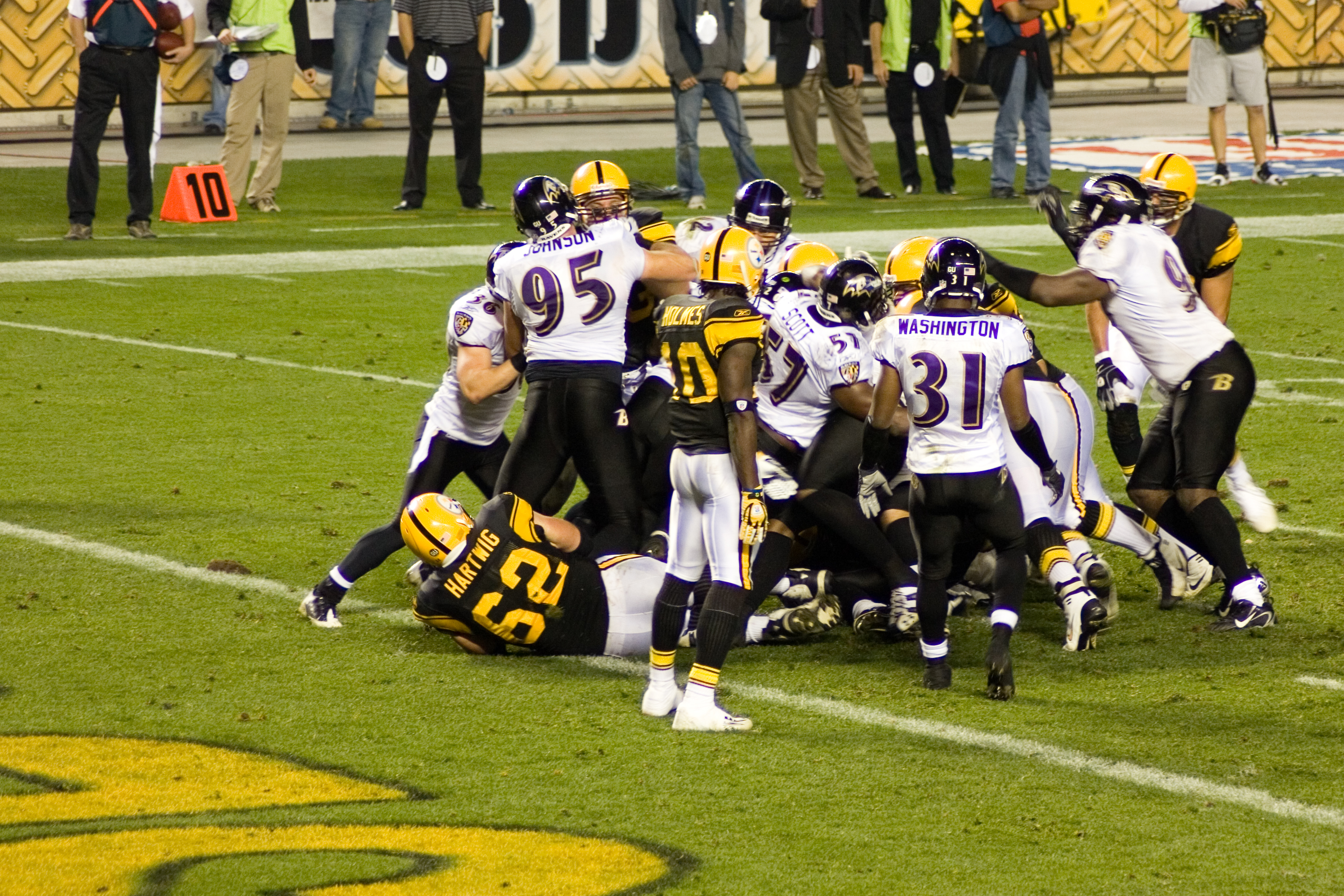
Washington (31) playing against the Pittsburgh Steelers in 2008.

Washington finished the 2008 season starting 12 games with 31 tackles and an interception. In the wild card game versus the Miami Dolphins, he got one of the four interceptions thrown by Chad Pennington in the 27–9 win by the Ravens.

In the final minutes of a November 22, 2009 home game against the Indianapolis Colts, he sustained a severe left knee injury, and had to be carried off the field. He missed the remainder of the season.

Washington signed a restricted free agent tender worth $1.809 million on May 19, 2010.

Washington was a starting cornerback for the Ravens for the 2010 season. After a poor showing against the Buffalo Bills, Washington was benched. Josh Wilson, who was acquired shortly before the 2010 season, had started each game until he signed with the Washington Redskins.

=== New Orleans Saints ===
On July 31, 2011, Washington signed a one-year contract with the New Orleans Saints. He was placed on injured reserve on September 1, following a hamstring injury, and was released from IR on September 13.

== Career statistics ==
=== NFL ===
Years	Team	GP	COMB	TOTAL	AST	SACK	FF	FR	FR YDS	INT	IR YDS	AVG IR	LNG IR	TD	PD
2005	OAK	16	43	40	3	0.0	0	1	0	0	0	0	0	0	5
2006	OAK	14	40	39	1	0.0	0	0	0	4	4	1	7	0	15
2007	OAK	15	40	33	7	0.0	1	0	0	1	0	0	0	0	8
2008	BAL	12	31	28	3	0.0	0	0	0	1	12	12	12	0	15
2009	BAL	10	36	34	2	0.0	0	0	0	0	0	0	0	0	6
2010	BAL	14	31	29	2	0.0	0	0	0	0	0	0	0	0	8
Career		81	221	203	18	0.0	1	1	0	6	16	3	12	0	57

=== College ===
Year	School	G	GS	Tackles					Interceptions			
Year	School	G	GS	Solo	Ast	Tot	Sacks	Sacks-Yards	Int	PD	FF	FR
2002	Nebraska	13	10	34	15	49	0	0	4	13	0	0
2003	Nebraska	13	13	36	19	55	0	0	4	10	0	0
2004	Nebraska	11	11	27	14	41	0	0	3	15	0	0
