= Braden River High School =

Public school in Florida, U.S.

Location
- 6545 SR 70 East; Bradenton, Florida 34203; United States
- 27.4504°N 82.4808°W

Information
- Type: Public high school
- Established: 2005; 21 years ago
- School district: School District of Manatee County
- Principal: Wendell Butler
- Staff: 78.00 (FTE)
- Grades: 9–12
- Enrollment: 1,801 (2023–2024)
- Student to teacher ratio: 23.09
- Colors: Maroon, gray, and black
- Team name: Pirates
- Website: manateeschools.net/bradenriver

Braden River High School is a public high school in Bradenton, Florida, United States. It is a part of the School District of Manatee County.

== History ==
Braden River High School was originally scheduled to open for the 2004–2005 school year but was delayed until the next school year. In February 2005, parents and future students voted to choose the mascot and school colors, and settled on a Pirate and maroon, black, and silver. Braden River opened its doors in August 2005 and welcomed 9th and 10th graders. For each of the following two years, a class was added, and BRHS graduated its first class in June 2008. 10 additional classrooms were added with an ability to accommodate 250 additional students. In the summer of 2020, the previous running track was replaced with a rubber one and in March 2021 the school hosted its first-ever track and field meet.

=== Dress code controversy ===
On April 5, 2018, The Bradenton Herald reported that a 17-year-old female student of the school, Lizzy Martinez, was forced to wear bandages over her nipples by the school dean and principal because she had not worn a bra to school because of a sunburn that she had acquired over spring break.

Martinez alleged that a teacher had called the principal's office over concerns that she wasn't wearing a bra, and that upon meeting with the principal and dean who told her that without a bra she was distracting the male students in the classroom. The school dean, Violeta Velazquez, had Martinez wear another shirt under the one she had worn to school before eventually sending her to the clinic and making her put bandages over her nipples.

In a statement after the incident, the school district’s general counsel, Mitchell Teitelbaum, released a statement in which the district acknowledged that the situation should've been handled more appropriately, but that Martinez had violated the dress code and that school officials were simply trying to help her fix the situation. However, the school district's dress code did not specifically address or require bras to be worn.

After the incident, Martinez and her friends organized a "bracott" to protest the school district's dress code policy by wearing bandages, a message on their shirt, or by going bra-less to school on April 16. The school district warned students against participating in the protest, and it was described as a "subdued" affair. The American Civil Liberties Union also sent a letter to the school district and principal, alleging that the treatment of Martinez violated Title IX, the Equal Protection Clause of the Fourteenth Amendment, the freedom of speech guaranteed in the First Amendment, and Florida’s Educational Equity Act.

== Academics ==
Braden River High School currently has 15 career and technical education teachers, 11 English teachers, 10 math teachers, 10 social studies teachers, 9 science teachers, 7 exceptional student education (for students with disabilities) teachers, 4 physical education teachers, 4 visual and performing arts teachers, 3 reading teachers, 3 foreign language teachers, 1 driver's education teacher, and 1 ESOL teacher. The school also employs several paraprofessionals. The school day is divided into seven periods and, as required by the state, the school follows the Sunshine State Standards.

Braden River High School Accountability Report
| School Year | School Grade | School Year | School Grade |
|---|---|---|---|
| 2005–2006 | B | 2015–2016 | B |
| 2006–2007 | B | 2016–2017 | B |
| 2007–2008 | A | 2017–2018 | A |
| 2008–2009 | B | 2018–2019 | A |
| 2009–2010 | B | 2019–2020 (Note: Not calculated due to the COVID-19 pandemic interrupting the school year.) | —N/a |
| 2010–2011 | B | 2020–2021 (Note: According to Florida Department of Education Emergency Order 2021-EO-02 schools could opt in to have their grade calculated for the 2020–2021 school year.) | —N/a |
| 2011–2012 | A | 2021–2022 | B |
| 2012–2013 | A | 2022–2023 | B |
| 2013–2014 | A | 2023–2024 | B |
| 2014–2015 | A | 2024–2025 | B |

== Athletics ==
Braden River's colors are maroon, black, and silver and their mascot is the Pirate. They offer the following sports programs:

| Fall sports | Winter sports | Spring sports |
|---|---|---|
| Football | Boys basketball | Boys baseball |
| Boys swimming & diving | Girls basketball | Girls softball |
| Girls swimming & diving | Boys soccer | Girls tennis |
| Girls cross county | Girls soccer | Boys tennis |
| Boys cross country | Girls weightlifting | Boys track & field |
| Girls volleyball | Wrestling | Girls track & field |
| Boys golf | | Boys weightlifting |
| Girls golf | | Flag football |

== Marching band ==
Braden River's marching band has been named Division 2 champion of the Florida Marching Band Championships in 2012, 2013, 2017, 2018, 2019, and 2024 and Florida Federation of Colorguards Circuit 3A state champion in 2025.

== Demographics ==
As of the 2024–2025 school year, Braden River enrolled 1,705 students. 898 students are male and 807 students are female. 810 identified as white, 566 identified as Hispanic, 160 identified as Black, 89 identified as Asian, and 80 identified as multi-racial.

== Notable alumni ==
- Brian Battie (transferred), football player
- Tyler Dyson, baseball player
- Deshaun Fenwick, football player
- Sharrod Neasman, football player
- Ryan Neuzil, football player
- Myles Straw, baseball player
- Ryan Waldschmidt, baseball player
- Sam Woolf, singer-songwriter and former American Idol contestant
