= State College of Florida Collegiate School =

Location
- Bradenton, and Venice, Florida; United States
- 27.439041°N 82.591084°W

Information
- Other name: SCFCS
- Type: Public charter school
- Established: 2010; 16 years ago
- School district: School District of Manatee County Sarasota County Schools
- Oversight: State College of Florida, Manatee–Sarasota
- NCES School ID: 120123007901
- Head of school: Karen Lewellen, Dr.Karen Peck
- Teaching staff: 21.00 (on an FTE basis)
- Grades: 6–12
- Enrollment: 485 (2024-25)
- Student to teacher ratio: 23.10:1
- Campuses: 2
- Colors: Green, white, and blue
- Mascot: Maverick the Manatee
- Website: scfcs.scf.edu scfcs.scf.edu/venice/

The State College of Florida Collegiate School (SCFCS) is a public charter school in Florida, United States. Established in Fall 2010, it is part of and operates on State College of Florida's Bradenton and Venice campuses. It was created through a charter with the School District of Manatee County.

The school includes grades 6–12, with the Venice campus only having grades 9-12. The Bradenton campus is outside the city limits, in the Bayshore Gardens census-designated place.

== History ==
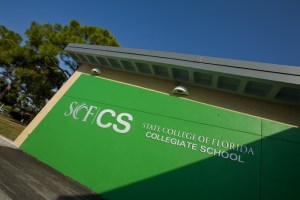
State College of Florida Collegiate School in Bradenton.

The Bradenton campus opened in 2010. It initially was to admit students in grades six or seven only but with additional grade levels placed as time passed. The first high school class, consisting of 57 students, graduated in 2014.

It was named a National Blue Ribbon School in 2016, and the State of Florida gave the school "A" rankings each year by 2016.

== Venice campus ==
The Venice campus opened on April 20, 1992; the Sarasota County School Board gave its approval to the creation the year before. The Venice campus opened with grade 11 students, and had an initial enrollment of 100 and later expanded to all senior high school grade levels. The current enrollment is now up to 164 students in grades 9th-12th. The Venice campus has been given the rank of "A" 3 years in a row. In the 2023-2024 school year, 14 students graduated with honors, and went on to college with substantial scholarships.

== Curriculum and academic program ==
The school is largely technology based, utilizing Canvas, from Instructure to assign and turn in schoolwork.

== Scholarship programs ==
Graduates of the university may attend State College of Florida, Manatee–Sarasota, for a tuition free education, as part of the Eagle Collegiate Scholarship. Students at both campuses are eligible.

== Citations ==
Smith, Ebony. “SCFCS Venice Receives Third Consecutive ‘A’ Grade on Florida’s Accountability Report.” State College of Florida, Manatee - Sarasota, 16 Aug. 2024, www.scf.edu/news/2024/08/20/scfcs-venice-receives-third-consecutive-a-grade-on-floridas-accountability-report/.
