= Døvydas =

Lithuanian musician

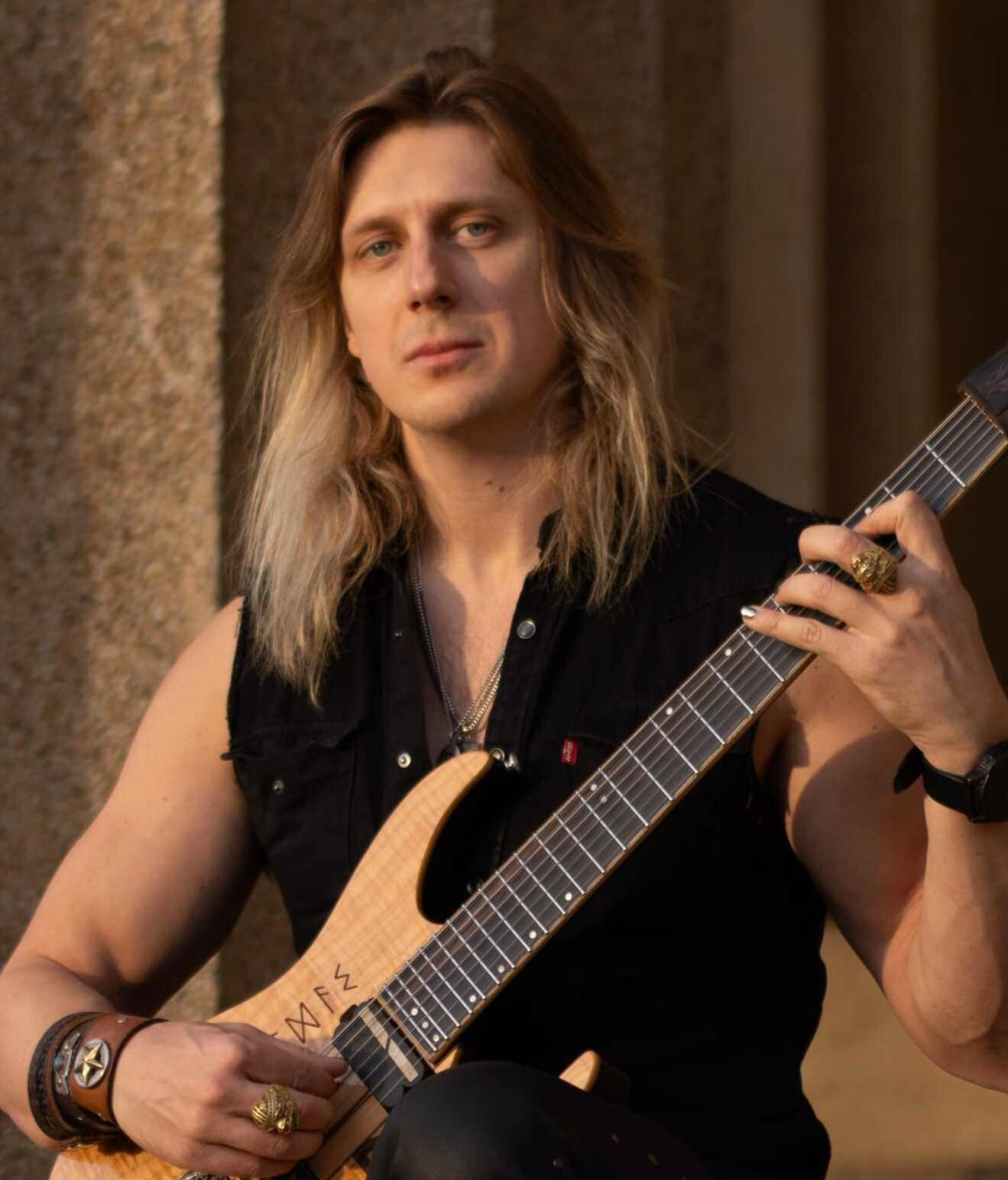
- Dovydas in 2024

Background information
- Born: Dovydas Maščinskas; September 5, 1992 (age 34); Kaunas, Lithuania
- Genres: American rock, blues rock, rock and roll, folk rock
- Occupations: Singer-songwriter, content creator
- Instruments: Electric guitar, cigar box guitar, drums, bass, harmonica, piano, xylophone
- Years active: 2008–present
- Labels: Howling Dog Studios, Studio G, Revelstar Stellonaut Records
- Website: www.imdovy.com

Dovydas Maščinskas (born September 5, 1992), better known as Døvydas (or DOVYDAS aka; Revelstar Stellonaut, and previously known as David Smash), is a Lithuanian-born musician, composer, singer-songwriter, multi-instrumentalist, and content creator. He was born and raised in Lithuania, and moved to the United States in 2012. He has appeared on national television in Lithuania, such as Lithuania's Got Talent 2009, Ring of Young Talents 2010, and Lithuania's Pick for Eurovision 2011. He was featured in a book about Lithuanian rock music titled Lietuvos Roko Istorija, written by the national-award-winning Lithuanian author Mindaugas Paleckis.

Døvydas has headlined major music festivals in Lithuania and Poland: "Visagino Country 2010", "Bliuzo Naktys 2010", "Wegorzewo 2011", and "Most Rockowy 2010". The Dovydas Band competed at the International Blues Challenge 2016, and made it to the semi-finals, something not achieved before by any Lithuanian-born person. At the International Blues Challenge he jammed with many musicians including the mountain dulcimer player Bing Futch.

Døvydas is a content creator on YouTube, Facebook, Instagram, and TikTok.

== Early life ==
Dovydas Maščinskas was born in Kaunas, the second-largest city of Lithuania. His father is a painter, and his mother stayed at home to raise him. Døvydas began playing guitar at age 13, and after taking private lessons from older guitar-playing friends, he enrolled at the Kaunas Children Music School. Later, he studied classical guitar at Naujalis Music Gymnasium. In 2010, he transferred to Kaunas Juozas Gruodis Music Conservatory.

== Career ==
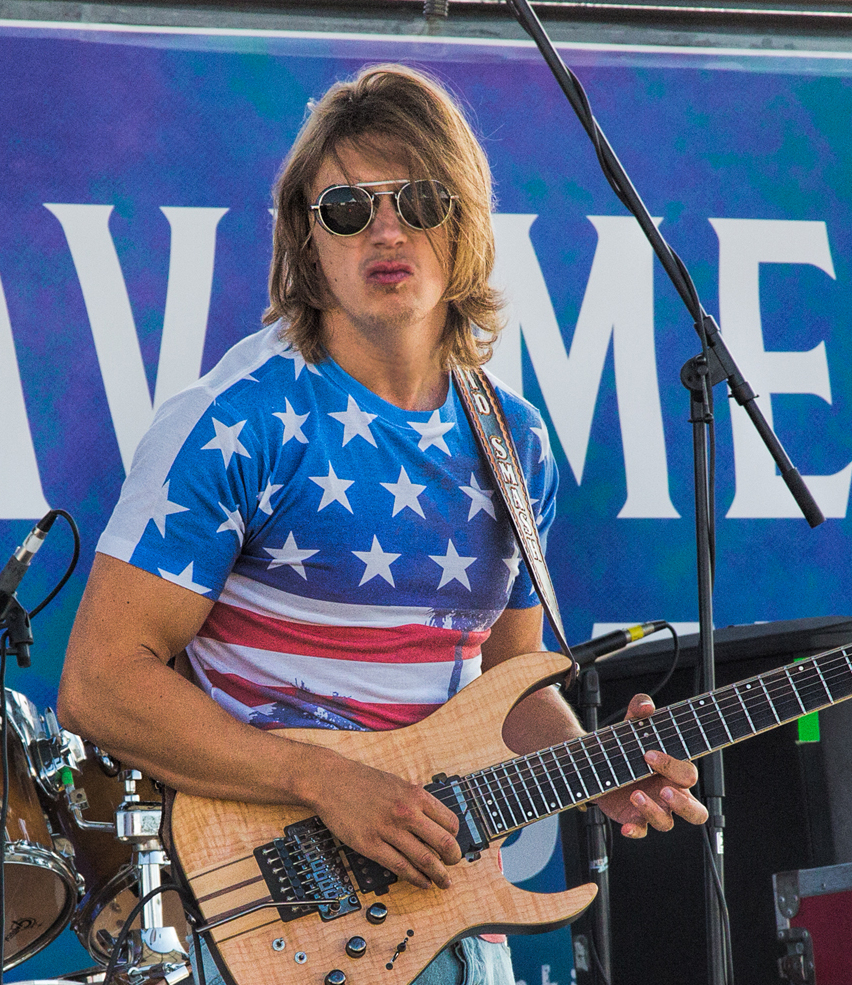
Dovydas in 2015

Døvydas started playing guitar at the age of thirteen in Lithuania, learning the drums, bass, piano, xylophone and harmonica shortly after. He was heavily inspired by a blues CD that his father bought in Germany, entitled Blues Giants Vol. 2, a compilation of blues songs by artists such as John Lee Hooker, Lightnin' Hopkins, BB King, Etta James, and Memphis Slim. Døvydas says, "It was magic. That CD with those songs was like having an invitation letter to Hogwarts. Not only the music was captivating and enchanting, they were singing in this amazing language, and they lived in this distant part of the world that I've only seen on television."

During school he formed his first band, "David Smash and the Smash Band", which was later shortened to simply "David Smash Band". The group began playing local competitions and festivals and after their appearances on national television, they received invitations to headline major music festivals in Lithuania and Poland. His relocation from Lithuania to Florida was strictly a professional music opportunity in 2011 at age 19, when the American blues musician Steve Arvey discovered a video of Dovydas performing on Lithuania's Got Talent. Impressed by his skills, Arvey contacted Dovydas online and convinced him to move to America to pursue a career as a professional musician, initially performing under the stage name "David Smash.".

In his first two years in Sarasota, Døvydas expanded his musical repertoire and integrated himself into the local music scene.

After signing a contract with the Del Couch Music Education Foundation and Howling Dog Studios, Døvydas released two CDs in the United States, one of them titled State Of Sunshine. In 2017 Døvydas formed his own independent record label, Revelstar Stellonaut Records, through which he releases his original music.

In August 2017, he uploaded a video from one of his performances, in which someone requests a song by Steve Vai. This video went viral and has accumulated 10 million views. Døvydas has credited this video with launching his career as a content creator.

Døvydas has performed in many locations around Florida, most notably St. Armands Circle in Sarasota. He has filmed many of his performances and posted them on YouTube, where he has over 2 million subscribers. One of his most popular videos is "Tennessee Whiskey", sung by Vere Hill.

In October 2022, Døvydas moved to Los Angeles, California.

== Musical influences ==
Døvydas was influenced by American music recordings owned by his parents. Among his most notable influences, he lists Johnny Cash, Ray Charles, Elvis Presley, James Brown, Jerry Lee Lewis, Nat King Cole and Dean Martin. Døvydas references Steve Vai as one of his favorite guitarists. Døvydas' impromptu rendition of the song "Tender Surrender" by Vai gained him significant success within the YouTube community, and his viewership has steadily increased since.

== Instruments ==
Døvydas is a multi-instrumentalist, and can play guitar, piano, drums, bass, harmonica, and xylophone. He uses a Boss RC505 Tabletop Loop Station in many of his solo performances, enabling him to create "live looped" songs with various instruments. Guitar brands such as C. F. Martin & Company, Gibson Brands, and Fender have sent him guitars to unbox and review.
