= Playlist Live =

American internet media convention

- Status: Inactive
- Genre: Online video influencer conference
- Locations: Orlando, Florida (2011–2022); Washington, D.C.; New York metropolitan area
- Country: United States
- Inaugurated: March 26, 2011; 15 years ago
- Most recent: 2022
- Attendance: 13,000 (2020)

Playlist Live was an annual convention held in Orlando, Florida, and Washington D.C., primarily for YouTube and TikTok content creators. The conference was first announced by organizers in December 2010. The first convention was held at the Orlando World Center Marriott and ran from March 26-27, 2011. The convention was also held in the New York tri-state area as well as Orlando and Washington.

With its latest event in 2022, the 2023 Orlando event was cancelled due to “logistical factors”. The trademark for Playlist Live was cancelled on May 19, 2023 , and the event will not continue. Notable content creators that have attended the event include Tana Mongeau, David Dobrik, Rebecca Black and Ricky Dillon. Content creators who are part of the Fullscreen multi-channel network, including MaxNoSleeves and Kristina Urribarres have also attended.

== The program ==
Playlist Live's programming was divided into three different tracks: the Community Track, the Insight Track and the Industry Track. These tracks ensure that all attendees, whether they be fans, creator, or managers and agents, have something to look forward to.

The Community Track was best suited for fans of YouTube creators. The panels on this track consist of creators talking about various lifestyle topics. These topics include mental health, staying motivated and LGBTQ life.

The Insight Track was created for current and aspiring YouTube content creators. The panels are geared toward teaching guests how to make a living from making YouTube videos.

The Industry Track was for guests who currently work in the media industry. This track benefits marketers, managers, agents, producers, etc. This track goes in depth of the technicalities of the business realm.

In 2020, Playlist Live Orlando hosted more than 13,000 attendees.
