= De Soto Heritage Festival =

Coordinates: 27.517216°N 82.576246°W

The De Soto Heritage Festival (also previously known as the De Soto Celebration or De Soto Pageant) is an annual series of events that takes place in Bradenton, Florida, the location of Hernando de Soto's landing in Florida in May 1539.

Organized by the Hernando de Soto Historical Society, the event has been held for over 80 years.

Festival events include the Children's Parade and Party in the Park, SeaFood Fest, Bottle Boat Regatta, Musical & Fashion Show, De Soto Ball and Grand Parade.

No festival was held from 1942 to 1945 nor 2020.
