= Tyler Dyson =

American baseball player (born 1997)

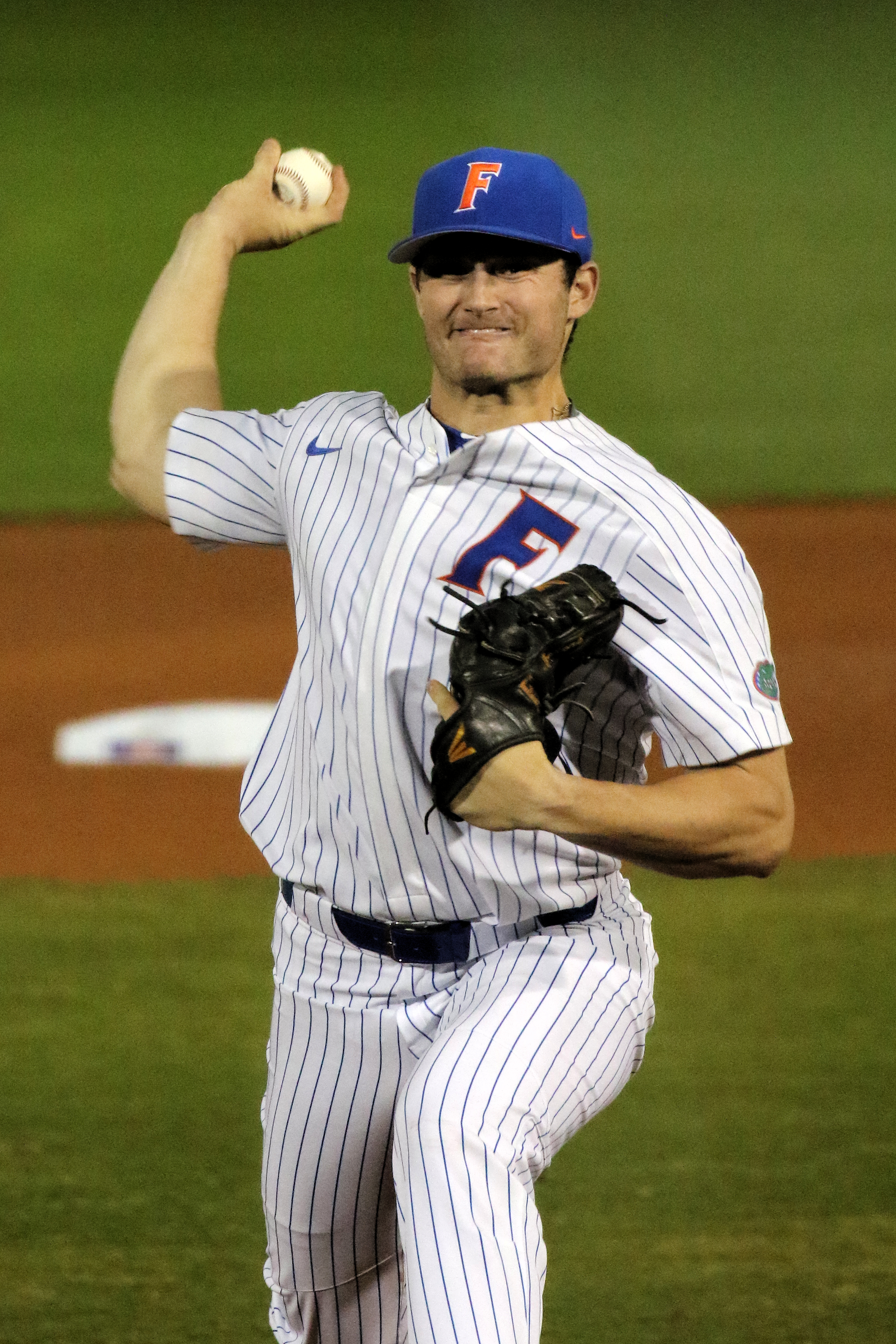
- Dyson with the Florida Gators in 2019

Free agent
- Pitcher
- Born: December 24, 1997 (age 28); Bradenton, Florida, U.S.
- Bats: Right Throws: Right

Tyler Dyson (born December 24, 1997) is an American professional baseball pitcher who is a free agent.

== Amateur career ==
Dyson attended Braden River High School in Bradenton, Florida. As a senior, he pitched to a 6–1 record with a 0.38 ERA along with batting .333 with two home runs and 17 RBIs. Undrafted out of high school in the 2016 MLB draft, he enrolled at the University of Florida to play college baseball for the Florida Gators.

As a freshman at Florida in 2017, Dyson went 4–0 with a 3.23 ERA in 39 innings. Dyson started Game 3 of the Gainesville Super Regional of the 2017 NCAA Division I baseball tournament against Wake Forest and struck out seven batters over five innings, clinching a trip to the College World Series. He also started the clinching game of the CWS against LSU, which Florida eventually won. That summer, he played in the Northwoods League where he posted a 1.59 ERA over 28 1/3 innings. In 2018, as a sophomore, Dyson appeared in 14 games (11 starts) in which he pitched to a 5–3 record with a 4.47 ERA. Following the season, he played for the Falmouth Commodores of the Cape Cod Baseball League, compiling a 2.37 ERA in 19 innings. Prior to the 2019 season, Dyson was named to the Golden Spikes Award watch list along with being named a Baseball America preseason All-American. For the season, he appeared in 11 games (nine starts), pitching to a 3–2 record with a 4.95 ERA.

== Professional career ==
=== Washington Nationals ===
Dyson was selected by the Washington Nationals in the fifth round, with the 153rd overall selection, of the 2019 Major League Baseball draft and signed for $500,000. He made his professional debut with the Rookie-level Gulf Coast League Nationals before being promoted to the Auburn Doubledays of the Low-A New York–Penn League after one game. Over nine starts between the two affiliates, Dyson went 2–1 with a 1.07 ERA, striking out 17 over 33 2/3 innings. Dyson did not play in a game in 2020 due to the cancellation of the minor league season because of the COVID-19 pandemic.

In 2021, Dyson participated in major league spring training with the Nationals before being assigned to the Wilmington Blue Rocks. Over ten games (six starts), Dyson went 1–3 with a 2.84 ERA and thirty strikeouts over 31 2/3 innings. He was placed on the injured list in mid-June and missed the remainder of the season, as well as the entirety of the 2022 season. Dyson returned to action in 2023, struggling to a 13.00 ERA in seven rehab appearances for the rookie-level Florida Complex League Nationals; he was released by the Nationals organization on July 25, 2023.

=== Staten Island FerryHawks ===
On March 12, 2024, Dyson signed with the Staten Island FerryHawks of the Atlantic League of Professional Baseball. In two starts for Staten Island, he struggled to an 0–1 record and 48.60 ERA with one strikeout over 1 2/3 innings of work. Dyson was released by the FerryHawks on May 5.
