= Deshaun Fenwick =

American football player (born 1999)

Profile
- Position: Running back

Personal information
- Born: December 31, 1999 (age 26)
- Listed height: 6 ft 1 in (1.85 m)
- Listed weight: 223 lb (101 kg)

Career information
- High school: Braden River (Bradenton, Florida)
- College: South Carolina (2018–2020); Oregon State (2021–2023)
- NFL draft: 2024: undrafted

Career history
- New England Patriots (2024)*; Green Bay Packers (2024)*; Calgary Stampeders (2025)*; BC Lions (2025)*
- * Offseason or practice squad member only
- Stats at CFL.ca

Deshaun E. Fenwick (born December 31, 1999) is an American professional football running back who is currently a free agent. He played college football for the South Carolina Gamecocks and Oregon State Beavers.

== Early life ==
Fenwick grew up in Louisville, Kentucky, before moving to Florida and attending Braden River High School, where he rushed for 2,786 yards and 29 touchdowns and hauled in 28 receptions for 538 yards and seven touchdowns. He committed to play college football at the University of South Carolina over other schools such as Boston College, Georgia, and Texas.

== College career ==
=== South Carolina ===
In his collegiate debut, Fenwick rushed for 112 yards and a touchdown in a win over Chattanooga. He finished the 2018 season with 115 yards and a touchdown over a span of two games. In week 10 of the 2019 season, Fenwick rushed for 102 yards in a win over Vanderbilt. He finished the 2019 season with 111 rushing yards in two games. In week 7, Fenwick rushed for 68 yards in a win over Auburn. In week 10, he rushed for 82 yards in a 59–42 loss to Ole Miss. The following week, Fenwick rushed for only seven yards but scored a touchdown in a loss to Missouri. He finished the season with 297 rushing yards and one touchdown and brought in 14 receptions for 108 yards. After the season, Fenwick entered the transfer portal.

=== Oregon State ===
Fenwick transferred to Oregon State. In week 3, he rushed for 59 yards and a touchdown in a 42–0 win over Idaho. Three weeks later, Fenwick rushed for 127 yards and two touchdowns in a loss to Washington State. In week 9, Fenwick rushed for 48 yards and a touchdown in a 39–25 loss to California. He finished the year with 448 rushing yards and four touchdowns, while also hauling in four receptions for 14 yards in his first season with Oregon State. Ahead of the 2022 season, Fenwick was named to the Doak Walker Award watchlist. He opened up the season rushing for 39 yards and a touchdown in a season-opening win over Boise State. In the next game, Fenwick rushed for 102 yards and a touchdown in a 35–32 win over Fresno State. In week 3 he rushed for 63 yards and a touchdown in a 68–28 win over Montana State. Fenwick rushed for only 29 yards but punched in a touchdown in a 17–14 loss to USC. In week 10, he rushed for 37 yards and two touchdowns in a 24–21 loss to Washington. In the season finale against rival Oregon, Fenwick rushed for 53 yards and a touchdown in a 38–34 upset win. In the 2022 Las Vegas Bowl, Fenwick he for 107 yards in a 30–3 win over Florida. He finished the season with 553 rushing yards and seven touchdowns, while also catching four passes for 15 yards.

== Professional career ==
Pre-draft measurables
Height	Weight	Arm length	Hand span	40-yard dash	10-yard split	20-yard split	20-yard shuttle	Three-cone drill	Vertical jump	Broad jump	Bench press
6 ft 0 7/8 in (1.85 m)	223 lb (101 kg)	31 1/8 in (0.79 m)	9 3/4 in (0.25 m)	4.77 s	1.65 s	2.74 s	4.47 s	7.34 s	32.5 in (0.83 m)	9 ft 8 in (2.95 m)	19 reps
All values from Pro Day

=== New England Patriots ===
After going unselected in the 2024 NFL draft, Fenwick signed with the New England Patriots as an undrafted free agent, on May 11, 2024. He was released on August 26, 2024.

=== Green Bay Packers ===
On December 24, 2024, Fenwick was signed to the Green Bay Packers practice squad. Fenwick was not re-signed by the Packers, following their wildcard round elimination from 2024–25 NFL playoffs, on January 14, 2025.

=== Calgary Stampeders ===
On March 7, 2025, Fenwick signed with the Calgary Stampeders of the Canadian Football League (CFL). He was released on May 14, 2025.

=== BC Lions ===
On May 24, 2025, Fenwick signed with the BC Lions. On June 1, 2025, Fenwick was assigned to the Lions' practice squad to start the 2025 CFL season. He was released on June 9, 2025.
