= Myles Straw =

American baseball player (born 1994)

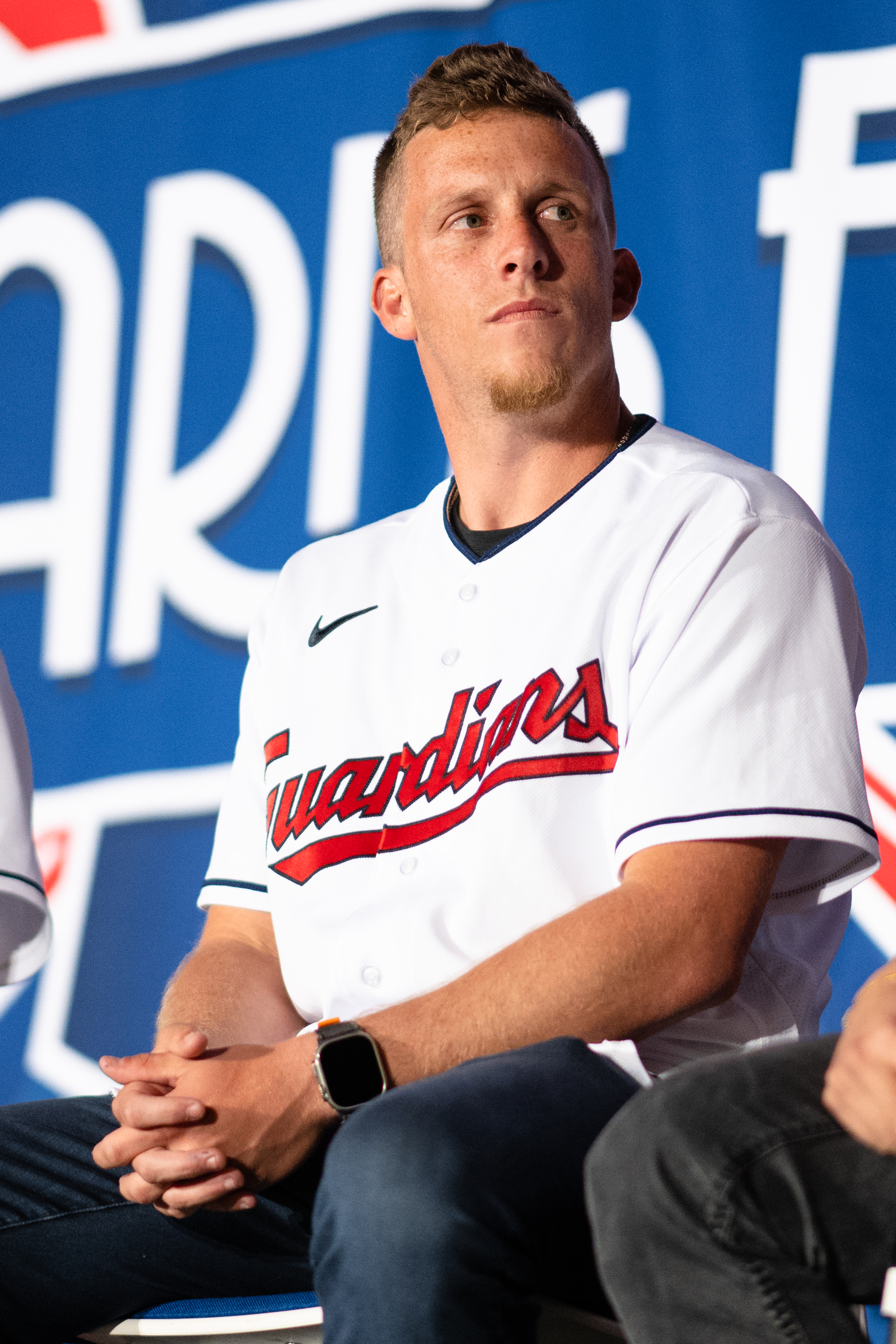
- Straw with the Cleveland Guardians in 2023

Free agent
- Center fielder
- Born: October 17, 1994 (age 32); Garden Grove, California, U.S.
- Bats: Right Throws: Right

MLB debut
- September 15, 2018, for the Houston Astros

MLB statistics (through 2026 season)
- Batting average: .246
- Home runs: 13
- Runs batted in: 183
- Stats at Baseball Reference

Teams
- Houston Astros (2018–2021); Cleveland Indians / Guardians (2021–2024); Toronto Blue Jays (2025–2026)

Career highlights and awards
- Gold Glove Award (2022)

Myles James Noble Straw (born October 17, 1994) is an American professional baseball center fielder who is a free agent. He has previously played in Major League Baseball (MLB) for the Houston Astros, Cleveland Indians / Guardians, and Toronto Blue Jays. Straw was selected by the Astros in the 12th round of the 2015 Major League Baseball draft, and made his MLB debut with them in 2018.

== Amateur career ==
Straw attended Braden River High School in Bradenton, Florida, and played college baseball at St. Johns River State College.

== Professional career ==
=== Houston Astros ===
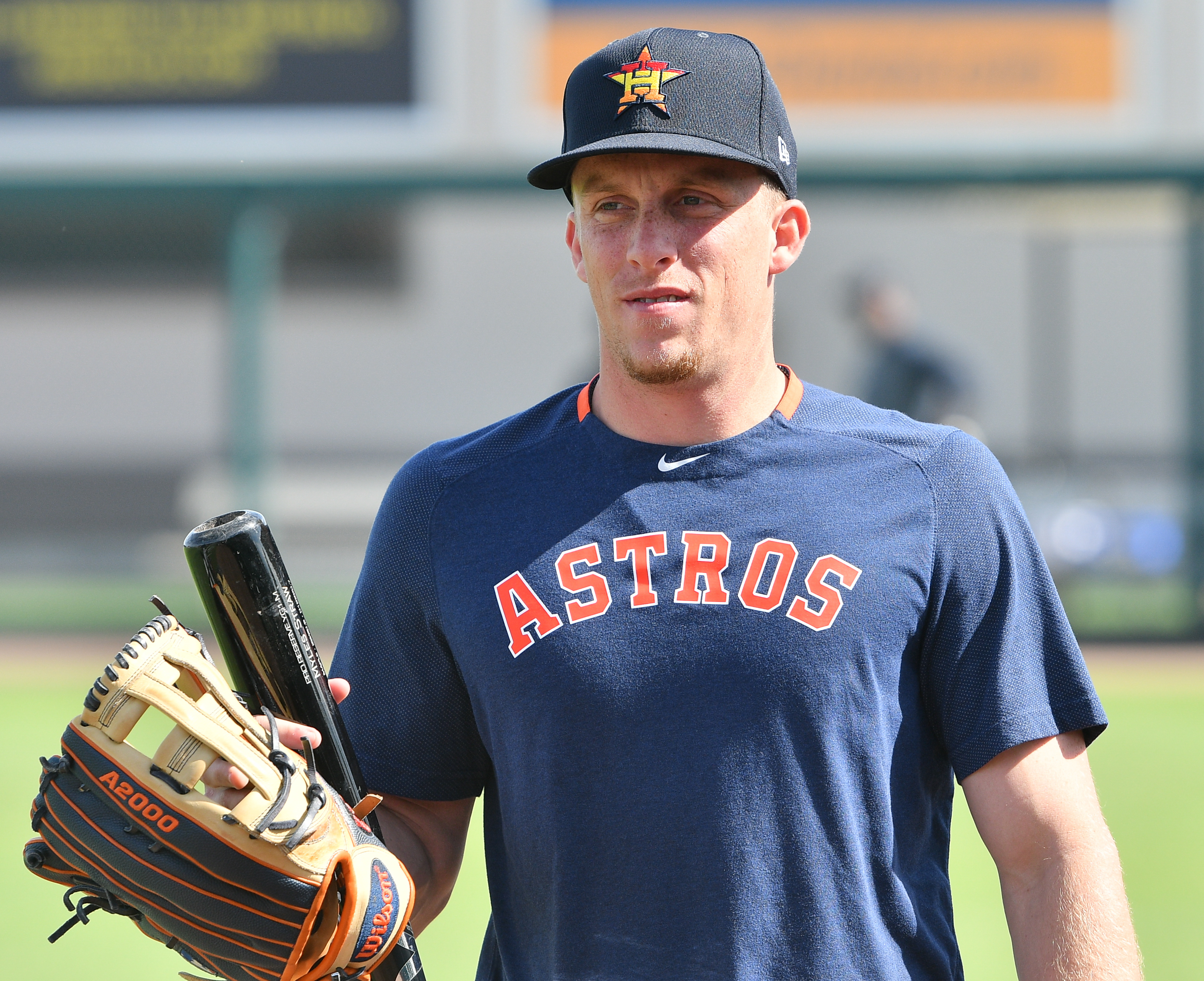
Straw with the Houston Astros in 2020

Straw was drafted by the Houston Astros in the 12th round of the 2015 Major League Baseball draft. He was planning on transferring to the University of South Alabama, but instead signed with the Astros.

Straw made his professional debut with the Greeneville Astros, with whom he batted .268 with 22 stolen bases in 58 games. He played in 2016 with the Quad Cities River Bandits and Lancaster JetHawks, slashing a combined .358/.423/.454 with one home run, 27 RBIs, and 21 stolen bases in 87 total games, and 2017 with the Buies Creek Astros and Corpus Christi Hooks where he hit a combined .290 with one home run, 44 RBIs, and 38 stolen bases in 127 games. Straw started 2018 with Corpus Christi and was promoted to the Fresno Grizzlies during the season.

Straw was promoted to the major leagues on September 15, 2018. He scored his first career run on September 21, 2018, after a bunt single by Jake Marisnick, as a pinch runner for J. D. Davis. The next day, Straw recorded his first career steal. On September 29, 2018, Straw hit his first Major League home run, against starting pitcher Yefry Ramírez of the Baltimore Orioles.

In 2019, Straw batted .269/.378/.343 with 27 runs, 7 RBIs, and 8 stolen bases while being caught once, in 108 at bats.

In 2020, Straw batted .207/.244/.256 with 8 runs, 8 RBIs, and 6 stolen bases while being caught twice, in 82 at bats. He played 27 games in center field, and one game at shortstop.

=== Cleveland Indians / Guardians ===
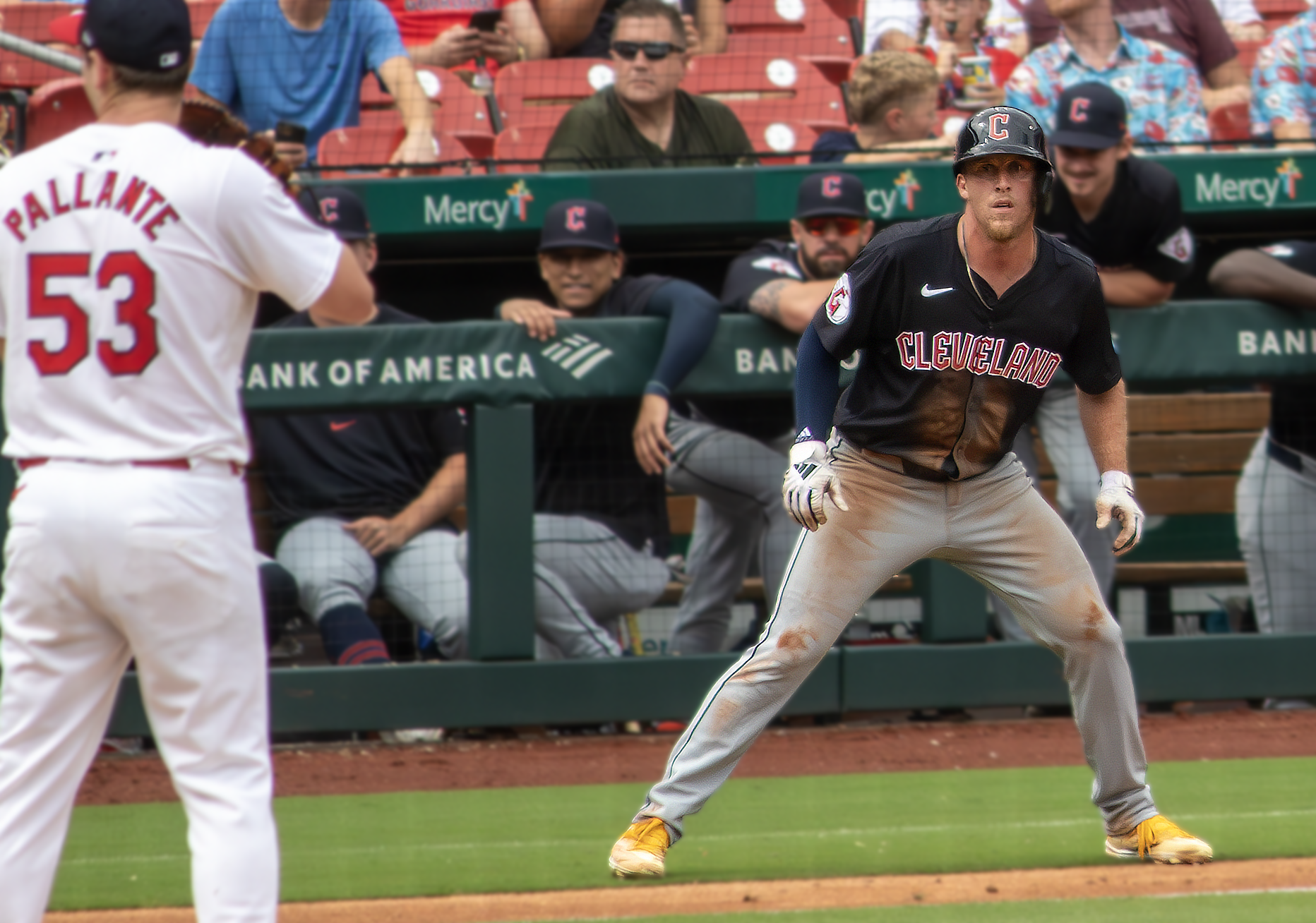
Straw takes his lead in St.Louis, 2024.

On July 30, 2021, Straw was traded to the Cleveland Indians in exchange for reliever Phil Maton and minor leaguer Yainer Díaz. Straw finished the 2021 season batting .271/.349/.348 with four home runs, 48 RBI and 30 stolen bases between the Astros and Indians.

On April 9, 2022, Straw signed a 5-year, $25 million extension with the Guardians. In 2022 he had the lowest slugging percentage and the lowest OPS (.564) in the majors, the lowest barrel percentage (0.7%), and the highest percentage of balls hit to the opposite field (36.1%). He batted .221/.291/.273 in 535 at bats, with no home runs, 32 RBI, and 21 stolen bases in 22 attempts. On defense, he won a Gold Glove Award in center field.

On August 11, 2023, Straw hit a solo home run off Tampa Bay Rays reliever Jason Adam, his first home run since 2021. In 2023, he batted .238/.301/.297, with one home run and a league-leading six sacrifice hits, had the lowest percentage of hard-hit balls of all AL players (18.0%), and had the lowest barrel percentage (0.5%).

On March 22, 2024, Straw was placed on outright waivers. After clearing waivers, Straw was sent outright to the Triple–A Columbus Clippers on March 24. In 123 games for Columbus, he slashed .240/.321/.330 with three home runs, 47 RBI, and 30 stolen bases. On September 17, the Guardians selected Straw's contract, adding him to their active roster. In 7 games for Cleveland, he went 1–for–4 (.250) with 2 stolen bases. On November 1, Straw was removed from the 40–man roster and sent outright to Columbus.

=== Toronto Blue Jays ===
On January 17, 2025, the Guardians traded Straw, cash, and international signing pool space to the Toronto Blue Jays in exchange for a player to be named later. On March 27, the Blue Jays selected Straw's contract after he made the team's Opening Day roster.

On November 2, 2026, the Blue Jays declined Straw's 2027 club option, making him a free agent.
