= Institute for Life Sciences Collaboration =

U.S. nonprofit organization

The Institute for Life Sciences Collaboration (ILSC) is a nonprofit foundation under clause 501(c)(3) of the U.S. tax code. It was established by its founders to develop collaborative and innovative solutions to pressing global health challenges and aims "to make meaningful and measurable improvements in the global healthcare landscape." ILSC focuses on three different activities: facilitating collaboration, strategically managing projects, and developing "innovative funding vehicles". ILSC is headquartered in New Haven, Connecticut.

== Facilitating collaboration ==
ILSC organizes events to discuss global health challenges. Antimicrobial resistance and antibiotic discovery has been a key focus for ILSC.

In 2014, ILSC co-sponsored a United Nations Conference, Antibiotic Resistance and Obsolescence: Meeting the Major Infectious Disease Challenge for Post-2015, and collected soil samples from participants in the 65th UN DPI/NGO Conference to address the growing problem of drug-resistant diseases and inventive ways to develop antibiotics. Co-Sponsors included the Global Foundation for Democracy and Development, Academia Mexicana de Derecho Internacional, Global Associates for Health Development, Inc., UNA/USA Southern NY State Division, UNA/USA NY Chapter, Child Wellness Research Foundation, World Council of Conservative Judaism, International Council of Jewish Women, and Yad Sarah.

In June 2015, ILSC hosted a UN conference on New Plant Derived Drugs from Traditional Chinese Medicine. This event was covered in two of the American Botanical Council's publications, including HerbalGram.

In November 2016, ILSC partnered with the Global Foundation for Democracy and Development (GFDD) and the United Nations Association of the United States of America (UNA-USA) Council of Organizations to host a conference at the UN Church Center on climate change, environmental law, and children's health.

== Collaborative projects ==
ILSC manages collaborative projects to maximize project success and is currently leading two projects.

In January 2015, ILSC agreed to partner with the Yale Partnerships for Global Health, IBM Foundation, One Campaign, the Government of Ghana and its Health Ministry, University of Ghana, and Ghana House of Chiefs to eliminate mother-to-child transmission (eMTCT) of HIV in Ghana.
