= Sharrod Neasman =

American football player (born 1991)

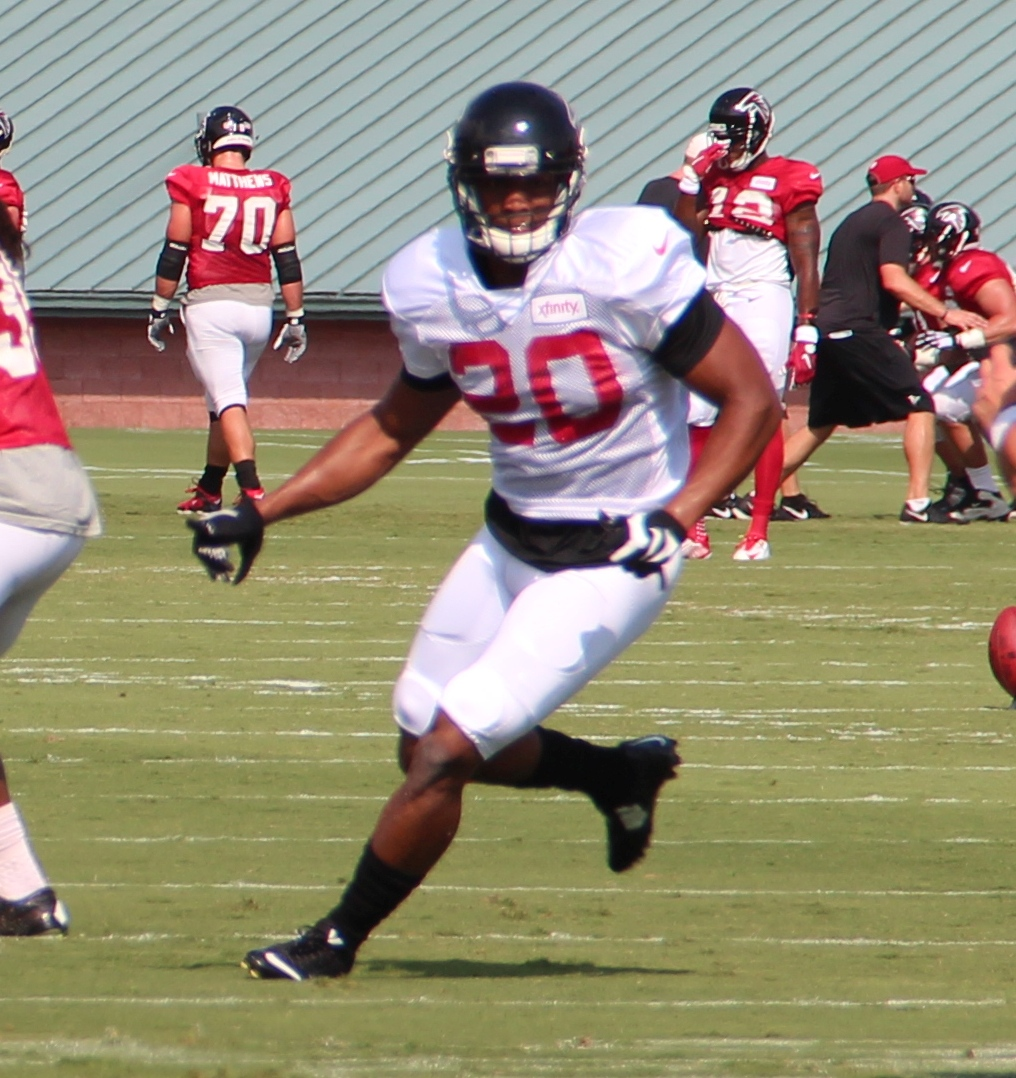
- Neasman with the Atlanta Falcons in 2016.

No. 20, 41, 35
- Position: Safety

Personal information
- Born: October 14, 1991 (age 35); Sarasota, Florida, U.S.
- Listed height: 6 ft 0 in (1.83 m)
- Listed weight: 198 lb (90 kg)

Career information
- High school: Braden River (Bradenton, Florida)
- College: Florida Atlantic
- NFL draft: 2016: undrafted

Career history
- Atlanta Falcons (2016–2017); New Orleans Saints (2018)*; Atlanta Falcons (2018–2020); New York Jets (2021); Los Angeles Rams (2021)*
- * Offseason or practice squad member only

Awards and highlights
- Super Bowl champion (LVI)

Career NFL statistics
- Total tackles: 94
- Sacks: 1
- Pass deflections: 7
- Interceptions: 1
- Fumble recoveries: 1
- Stats at Pro Football Reference

Sharrod Neasman (born October 14, 1991) is an American former professional football player who was a safety in the National Football League (NFL). He played college football for the Florida Atlantic Owls and was signed by the Atlanta Falcons as an undrafted free agent in 2016.

== Professional career ==
=== Atlanta Falcons ===
On May 5, 2016, Neasman signed with the Atlanta Falcons as an undrafted free agent. He was released by the Falcons on September 3, and was signed to the practice squad the next day. He was promoted to the active roster on October 18.

In the 2016 season, Neasman and the Falcons reached Super Bowl LI, where they faced the New England Patriots on February 5, 2017. In the Super Bowl, the Falcons fell in a 34–28 overtime defeat.

In 2017, Neasman played in 11 games, recording two tackles. He was not tendered a contract following the 2017 season.

=== New Orleans Saints ===
On May 31, 2018, Neasman signed with the New Orleans Saints. He was waived by New Orleans on September 1.

=== Atlanta Falcons (second stint) ===
On September 25, 2018, Neasman was signed by the Falcons. He played in 12 games, recording 44 tackles and four passes defensed.

Neasman re-signed with the Falcons on March 20, 2020.

In Week 15 against the Tampa Bay Buccaneers, Neasman recorded his first career sack on Tom Brady during the 31–27 loss.

=== New York Jets ===
On June 10, 2021, Neasman signed with the New York Jets. He was placed on injured reserve on September 11. He was activated on October 2. He was released on January 8, 2022 before the season finale.

=== Los Angeles Rams ===
On January 12, 2022, Neasman was signed to the Los Angeles Rams practice squad. Neasman won Super Bowl LVI when the Rams defeated the Cincinnati Bengals.
