= Ryan Neuzil =

American football player (born 1997)

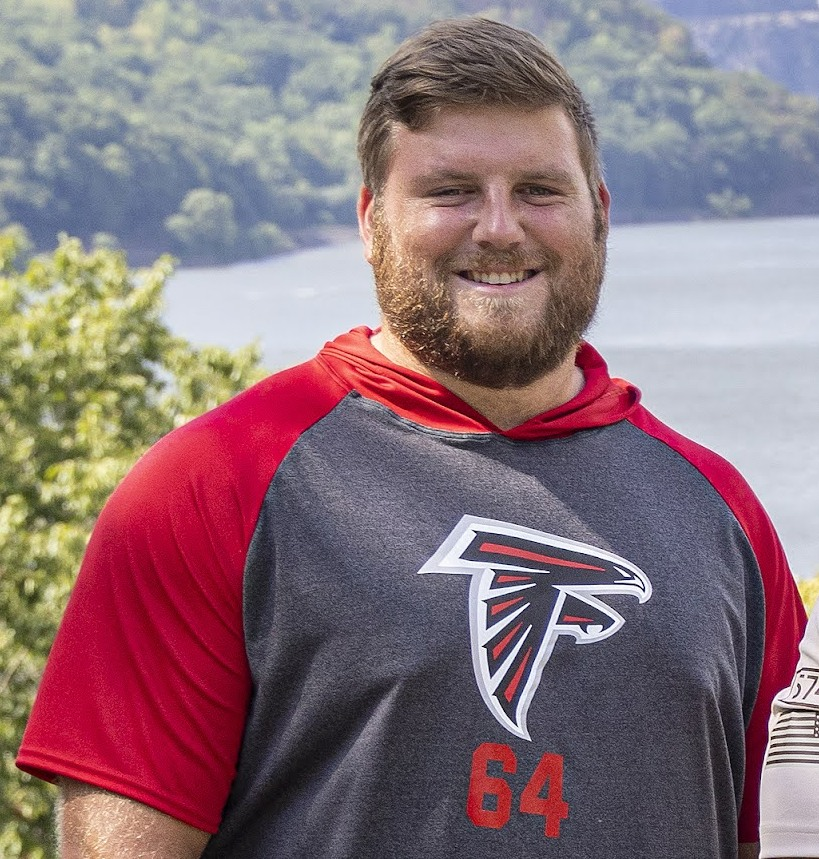
- Neuzil with the Atlanta Falcons in 2022

No. 58 – Baltimore Ravens
- Position: Center
- Roster status: Active

Personal information
- Born: July 31, 1997 (age 29); Bradenton, Florida, U.S.
- Listed height: 6 ft 3 in (1.91 m)
- Listed weight: 305 lb (138 kg)

Career information
- High school: Braden River (Bradenton)
- College: Appalachian State (2016–2020)
- NFL draft: 2021: undrafted

Career history
- Atlanta Falcons (2021–2026); Baltimore Ravens (2026–present)

Career NFL statistics as of Week 9, 2026
- Games played: 69
- Games started: 38
- Stats at Pro Football Reference

Ryan Scott Neuzil (born July 31, 1997) is an American professional football center for the Baltimore Ravens of the National Football League (NFL). He played college football for the Appalachian State Mountaineers and was signed by the Atlanta Falcons as an undrafted free agent in 2021.

== Early life ==
Neuzil was born on July 31, 1997, in Bradenton, Florida. He attended Braden River High School and played tight end there, recording 26 receptions for 470 yards and two touchdowns as a senior. He was a first-team all-district and all-area selection at tight end, and also served as the team's punter, having an average of 45 yards-per-punt.

A two-star prospect, Neuzil chose Appalachian State out of 12 scholarship offers. His position was changed to center upon joining the school's football team. As a true freshman in 2016, Neuzil redshirted. In 2017, he appeared in seven games, beginning the year as backup center before being moved to starter at left guard. As a sophomore in 2018, Neuzil started all 13 games as a left guard and was selected second-team all-conference by Pro Football Focus (PFF).

Neuzil was named a first-team all-conference selection as a junior in 2019, having started all 14 games as the team's left guard. In 2020, he started 12 games and was named first-team all-conference by PFF and third-team by the league's media and coaches. He was also named second-team All-American by Sporting News and PFF, and was a fourth-team selection by Phil Steele. He declared for the NFL draft following the season.

== Professional career ==
Pre-draft measurables
Height	Weight	Arm length	Hand span	Wingspan	40-yard dash	10-yard split	20-yard split	20-yard shuttle	Three-cone drill	Vertical jump	Broad jump	Bench press
6 ft 2 1/2 in (1.89 m)	301 lb (137 kg)	31 1/2 in (0.80 m)	9 1/2 in (0.24 m)	6 ft 3 in (1.91 m)	5.07 s	1.77 s	2.93 s	4.55 s	7.38 s	29.0 in (0.74 m)	8 ft 6 in (2.59 m)	30 reps
All values from Pro Day

=== Atlanta Falcons (2021–2026) ===
After going unselected in the 2021 NFL draft, Neuzil was signed by the Atlanta Falcons as an undrafted free agent. He was waived at the final roster cuts but was re-signed to the practice squad afterwards. He was released on October 29, but was then brought back on November 1. After spending the entire 2021 season on the practice squad, Neuzil signed a future contract with Atlanta in January 2022. He was waived at the final roster cuts again in 2022, and was then brought back as a member of the practice squad. Neuzil was elevated to the active roster for the Falcons' week nine game against the Los Angeles Chargers, and made his NFL debut in the 17–20 loss, appearing on four special teams snaps. He was promoted to the active roster on November 22, 2022.

On March 3, 2024, Neuzil signed a one–year contract extension with the Falcons.

On May 28, 2025, Neuzil signed a two-year, $9.5 million contract extension with the Falcons.

=== Baltimore Ravens (2026–present) ===
In November 2026, the Falcons traded Neuzil to the Baltimore Ravens in exchange for offensive lineman Andrew Vorhees and a sixth-round pick in the 2028 NFL draft.

== Personal life ==
Neuzil's father Jeff played in the Kansas City Royals organization at the Triple-A level.
