= School District of Manatee County =

School district in Florida, United States

Coordinates: 27.4799195°N 82.345189°W

Location
- Manatee County, Florida West Florida United States

District information
- Type: Public
- Motto: Inspiring our Students to Learn, Dream and Achieve
- Grades: K-12
- Superintendent: Dr. Jason C. Wysong
- Budget: $1.056 billion

Students and staff
- Students: 50,000
- Teachers: 3,500
- Staff: 7,000

Other information
- Website: School District of Manatee County

The School District of Manatee County, in Manatee County, Florida, provides education to over 50,000 students. It employs over 7,000 people.

The School District is managed by the Manatee County School Board and the Superintendent. Dr. Jason C. Wysong is the current Superintendent of Schools. Current Manatee County School Board members are Gina Messenger, District 1; Charlie Kennedy, District 2; Mary Foreman, District 3; Chad Choate, District 4; and Rev. James Golden, District 5.

As of June 2019, SDMC has achieved an overall ranking of “B,” according to the Florida Department of Education's school grade system, which is based on the New Florida Standards and Florida Standard Assessments (FSA) test results.

== Senior leadership ==
=== School board of Manatee County ===
The district's administrative offices are primarily located in Bradenton, Florida at 215 Manatee Avenue West. The School District of Manatee County is governed by the School Board of Manatee County, a body of five elected officers, each board member representing a particular geographic area.

=== Superintendent ===
Mrs. Cynthia Saunders was sworn in as Superintendent of the School District of Manatee County on June 28, 2018, following the departure of former Superintendent Dr. Diana Greene, who was named Superintendent of Duval County Public Schools.

On February 12, 2019, the School Board approved a contract to retain Mrs. Saunders as the full-time Superintendent moving forward. Board members cited her performance as Superintendent during the previous seven months, her in-depth knowledge of issues confronting the school district and the fact that her leadership would bring a sense of stability to the district as strong reasons for her continued service.

Controversy: Cynthia Saunders was under investigation by the Florida Department of Education Office of Professional Practices for inflating district graduation rates and was cited with sanctions on her certificate.

== Schools ==
=== High schools ===
- Bayshore (Bruin)
- Braden River High School (Pirate)
- Lakewood Ranch (Mustang)
- Manatee (Hurricane)
- Palmetto (Tiger)
- Parrish Community High School (Bull)
- Southeast (Seminole)

=== Middle schools ===
- Braden River Middle School
- Buffalo Creek Middle School
- Carlos E. Haile Middle School
- Dr. Mona Jain Middle School
- Martha B. King Middle School
- Electa Arcott Lee Middle School
- Lincoln Memorial Middle School
- R. Dan Nolan Middle School
- W. D. Sugg Middle School

=== K-8 ===
- Harvey K-8 (Formerly Barbara A. Harvey Elementary School)
- Johnson K-8
- Lake Manatee K-8
- Palm View K-8

=== Elementary schools ===
- Florine J. Abel Elementary School
- Anna Maria Elementary School
- Ballard Elementary School
- William H. Bashaw Elementary School
- Bayshore Elementary School
- Blackburn Elementary School
- Braden River Elementary School
- Blanche H. Daughtrey Elementary School
- Freedom Elementary School
- B. D. Gullett Elementary School
- Marjorie G. Kinnan Elementary School
- Manatee Elementary School
- Gilbert W. McNeal Elementary School
- Jessie P. Miller Elementary School
- Virgil Mills Elementary School
- H. S. Moody Elementary School
- Myakka City Elementary School
- Oneco Elementary School
- Palma Sola Elementary School
- Palmetto Elementary School
- Robert H. Prine Elementary School
- William Monroe Rowlett Elementary School
- G. D. Rogers Garden/Bullock Elementary School
- Samoset Elementary Accelerated School
- Sea Breeze Elementary School
- Ida M. Stewart Elementary School
- Tara Elementary School
- James Tillman Elementary School
- Annie Lucy Williams Elementary School
- Gene Witt Elementary School
- Robert E. Willis Elementary School

=== Alternative education ===
- Horizons Academy (K-12)

=== Charter schools ===
- Manatee School for the Arts
- State College of Florida Collegiate School
