= Bayshore High School =

Public high school in Bradenton, Florida, United States

Location
- 5401 34th Street West; Bradenton, Florida 34210; United States
- 27°26′46″N 82°35′45″W

Information
- Type: Comprehensive public high school
- Opened: 1974; 52 years ago
- School district: Manatee County School District
- CEEB code: 100141
- NCES School ID: 120123001220
- Principal: Scott Cooper
- Teaching staff: 70.00 (on an FTE basis)
- Grades: 9–12
- Enrollment: 1,464 (2023–2024)
- Student to teacher ratio: 20.91
- Colors: Blue, gold, white
- Mascot: Bruin
- Website: manateeschools.net/bayshore

Bayshore High School is a public high school located in Bradenton, Florida, United States. The high school is part of Manatee County School District and located at 5401 34th Street West.

== History ==
In 2007 Bayshore opened up a pre-college center for incoming freshmen but was sold to Manatee Technical Institute in 2013.

In 1998, A new campus was built south of the original 1974 building which was demolished and the land converted into a parking lot and football field.

== Notable alumni ==
- Rob McKittrick, filmmaker
