= Manatee School for the Arts =

Manatee School For the Arts

Location
- 700 Haben Blvd; Palmetto, Florida 34221; United States; 27°31′02″N 82°33′00″W

Information
- Other names: MSA
- Type: Tuition- Free Public Charter
- Motto: Live The Arts!
- School district: Manatee County School District
- CEEB code: 101766
- NCES School ID: 120123003429
- Principal: Dr. Steven Marshall
- Teaching staff: 104.17 (on an FTE basis)
- Grades: 6–12
- Enrollment: 2000-2200 (2023-24)
- Student to teacher ratio: 18.89
- Website: msfta.org

Manatee School For the Arts (MSA) is a tuition-free public charter school serving students in grades 6–12 in Palmetto, Florida. MSA combines rigorous academics with exceptional opportunities in visual and performing arts, including music, dance, theater, and more. Students benefit from a supportive learning environment, college and career preparation, and advanced academic opportunities, including Cambridge AICE, Advanced Placement (AP), and Dual Enrollment. Serving families throughout Manatee County, MSA empowers students to discover their talents, pursue academic excellence, and prepare for success beyond graduation.

== History ==
Manatee School for the Arts (MSA) was established in 1998 through the vision of its founder and principal, Dr. Bill Jones, with the support of Mrs. Una Jones and a group of community supporters. The school initially opened with approximately 250 students in grades six and seven. During its second year, MSA expanded to include eighth grade. In 2001, the school established its high school program, and its first graduating class completed their studies in 2005.

Since its founding, Manatee School for the Arts has combined traditional academic instruction with an emphasis on visual and performing arts education. The school's curriculum includes dance, theater, music, visual arts, and digital arts, alongside core academic subjects. Students may pursue advanced academic coursework, including dual enrollment opportunities that allow them to earn college credit while completing high school.

The school's educational approach incorporates arts integration across academic disciplines, providing students with opportunities to connect artistic expression with traditional classroom learning. Arts instruction begins in sixth grade and continues through high school, with students participating in performances, exhibitions, and other artistic activities. The school's arts faculty includes educators with professional experience in their respective disciplines. MSA alumni have pursued careers and further education in the performing arts, visual arts, and a variety of other professional fields.

Manatee School for the Arts originally operated in a converted bowling alley in Palmetto, Florida. As enrollment increased, the campus underwent multiple renovations and expansions to accommodate additional students, faculty, and educational programs. The school subsequently expanded to four buildings and a faculty of more than 115 teachers, with enrollment reaching approximately 1,900 students during the period described in its institutional history.

MSA serves students primarily from Manatee County, with additional enrollment from neighboring Sarasota, Hillsborough, and Pinellas counties. The school is operated by Renaissance Arts and Education, Inc., a Florida nonprofit educational organization.
