= Jena Irene Asciutto =

American singer

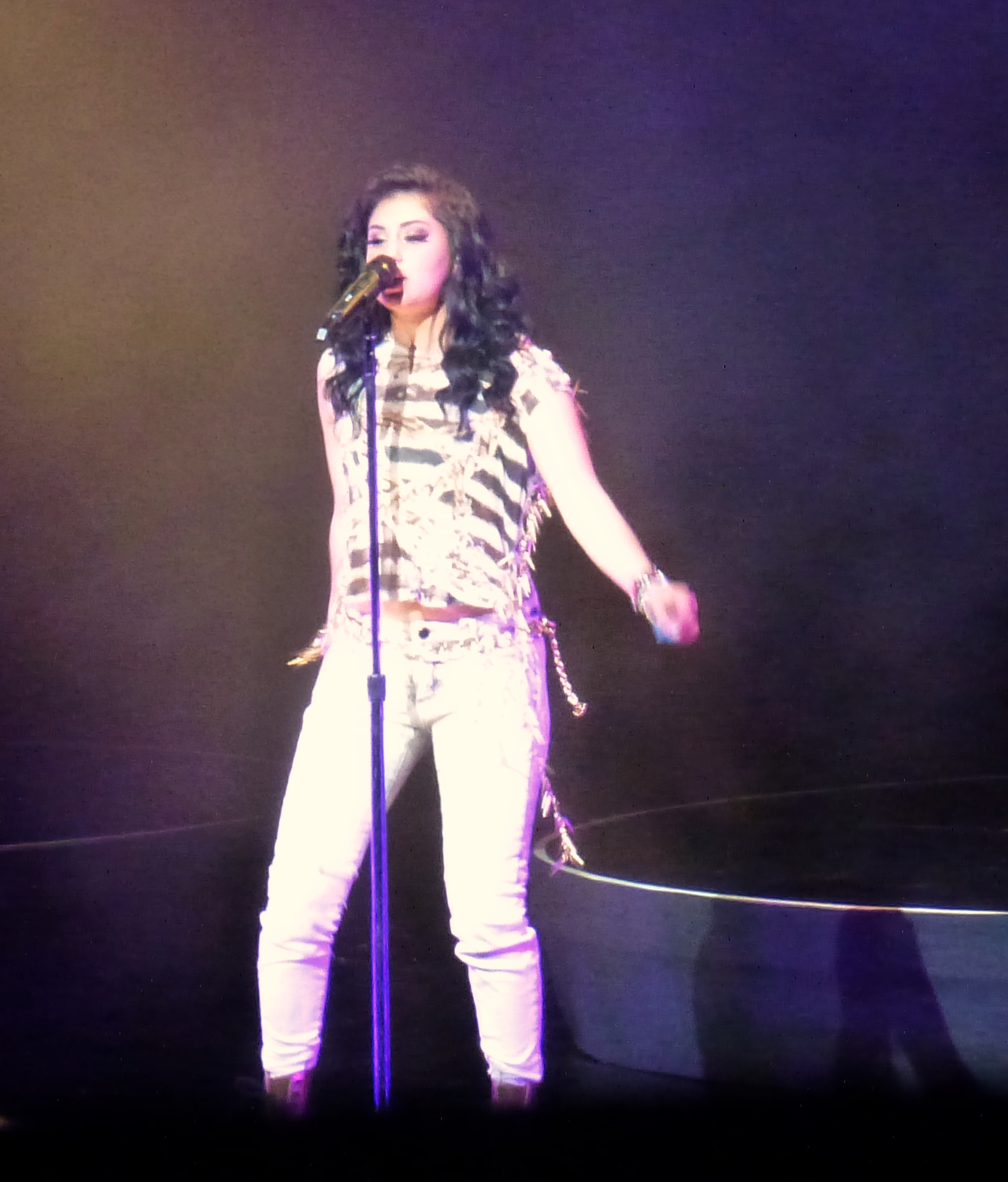
- Asciutto in 2014

Background information
- Also known as: Jena Irene
- Born: July 13, 1996 (age 29); Farmington Hills, Michigan, United States
- Genres: Alternative rock; pop rock
- Occupation: Singer-songwriter
- Instruments: Vocals; piano
- Years active: 2014–present
- Label: Original 1265 Recordings
- Website: www.jenamusic.com

Jena Irene Asciutto (/əˈʃuːtoʊ/ ə-SHOO-toh; born July 13, 1996), also known mononymously as Jena Irene, is an American singer-songwriter who first came to prominence in 2014 as the runner-up on the thirteenth season of American Idol. Asciutto became the first female Wild Card contestant of the series to qualify into the finale and became the second Wild Card contestant, after Clay Aiken in the second season, to make it into the finale. In April 2015, she signed a long-term recording deal with the independent Detroit label Original 1265 Recordings. Asciutto released her debut EP, Innocence, on April 22, 2016, which was followed by her debut album, Cold Fame, on June 2, 2017.

== Early life ==
Jena Irene Asciutto was born in Farmington Hills, Michigan, on July 13, 1996, to Julie (née Loiselle) and George Asciutto. She graduated from North Farmington High School on June 8, 2014. She participated in North Farmington's annual "Coffee House" talent show, and from ages 12–16 was a member of a band called Infinity Hour, before it disbanded in February 2013, prior to her American Idol audition.

== Career ==
=== 2014-present: American Idol, Innocence, and Cold Fame ===
While on American Idol, she performed under the shortened name of Jena Irene. For her American Idol audition, Asciutto sang "Rolling in the Deep" by Adele. During the audition process, production continually called her "Jena Irene", possibly due to a mistake she made when writing down her name, as "Irene" is not her surname, but rather her middle name. Although she initially made attempts to correct her name, she eventually decided to keep the name professionally.

During the group round, she sang "Too Close" by Alex Clare, alongside Sikenya Thomson, Allie Odom, and Mufarid Zaidi. She made it into the third part of Hollywood week by singing an original song called "Unbreakable Me," which has since been released on iTunes. Asciutto performed the song again during her hometown visit after making it to the top 3. She was announced as the runner-up on May 21, 2014.

==== Performances on American Idol ====
Episode	Theme	Song choice	Original artist	Order	Result
Audition	Auditioner's Choice	"Rolling in the Deep"	Adele	N/A	Advanced
Hollywood Round, Part 1	A Capella	"Video Games"	Lana Del Rey	N/A	Advanced
Hollywood Round, Part 2	Group Performance	"Too Close" with Sikenya Thompson, Allie Odom, and Munfarid Zaidi	Alex Clare	N/A	Advanced
Hollywood Round, Part 3	Solo	"Unbreakable Me" (original composition)	Jena Irene	N/A	Advanced
Top 31 (10 Women)	Personal Choice	"Paint It, Black"	The Rolling Stones	4	Wild Card
Wild Card	Hollywood Solo	"Unbreakable Me" (original composition)	Jena Irene	2	Advanced
Top 13	This Is Me	"The Scientist"	Coldplay	8	Safe
Top 12	Home	"Suddenly I See"	KT Tunstall	1	Bottom 3
Top 11	Songs from the Cinema	"Decode"	Paramore	10	Safe
Top 10	Billboard Top 10	"Clarity"	Zedd feat. Foxes	3	Safe
Top 9	I'm with the Band!	"Bring Me to Life"	Evanescence feat. Paul McCoy	9	Safe
Top 8	Back to the Start	Duet "Just Give Me a Reason" with Alex Preston	Pink feat. Nate Ruess	3	Safe
Top 8	Back to the Start	Solo "Rolling in the Deep"	Adele	9	Safe
Top 8	Songs from the 1980s	Solo "I Love Rock 'n' Roll"	Arrows	1	Safe
Top 8	Songs from the 1980s	Duet "It's Only Love" with Caleb Johnson	Bryan Adams & Tina Turner	5	Safe
Top 7	Competitors' Choice	Duet "Gimme Shelter" with Caleb Johnson	The Rolling Stones	6	Safe
Top 7	Competitors' Choice	Solo "Creep"	Radiohead	10	Safe
Top 6	Rock 'n' Roll	"Barracuda"	Heart	1	Safe
Top 6	Country	"So Small"	Carrie Underwood	10	Safe
Top 5	America's Requests	Trio "Best Day of My Life" with Alex Preston & Sam Woolf	American Authors	3	Safe
Top 5	America's Requests	Solo "My Body"	Young the Giant	6	Safe
Top 5	America's Requests	Solo "Valerie"	Amy Winehouse	9	Safe
Top 4	Love Songs	"Heartbreaker"	Pat Benatar	4	Safe
Top 4	Love Songs	"Bad Romance"	Lady Gaga	7	Safe
Top 4	Love Songs	"Can't Help Falling in Love"	Elvis Presley	11	Safe
Top 3	Randy Jackson's Choice	"Titanium"	David Guetta feat. Sia	3	Safe
Top 3	Judges' Choice	"Heart Attack"	Demi Lovato	6	Safe
Top 3	Hometown's Choice	"Creep"	Radiohead	9	Safe
Finale	Simon Fuller's Choice	"Dog Days Are Over"	Florence + the Machine	1	Runner-up
Finale	Reprisal Song	"Can't Help Falling in Love"	Elvis Presley	3	Runner-up
Finale	Winner's Single	"We Are One"	Jena Irene	5	Runner-up

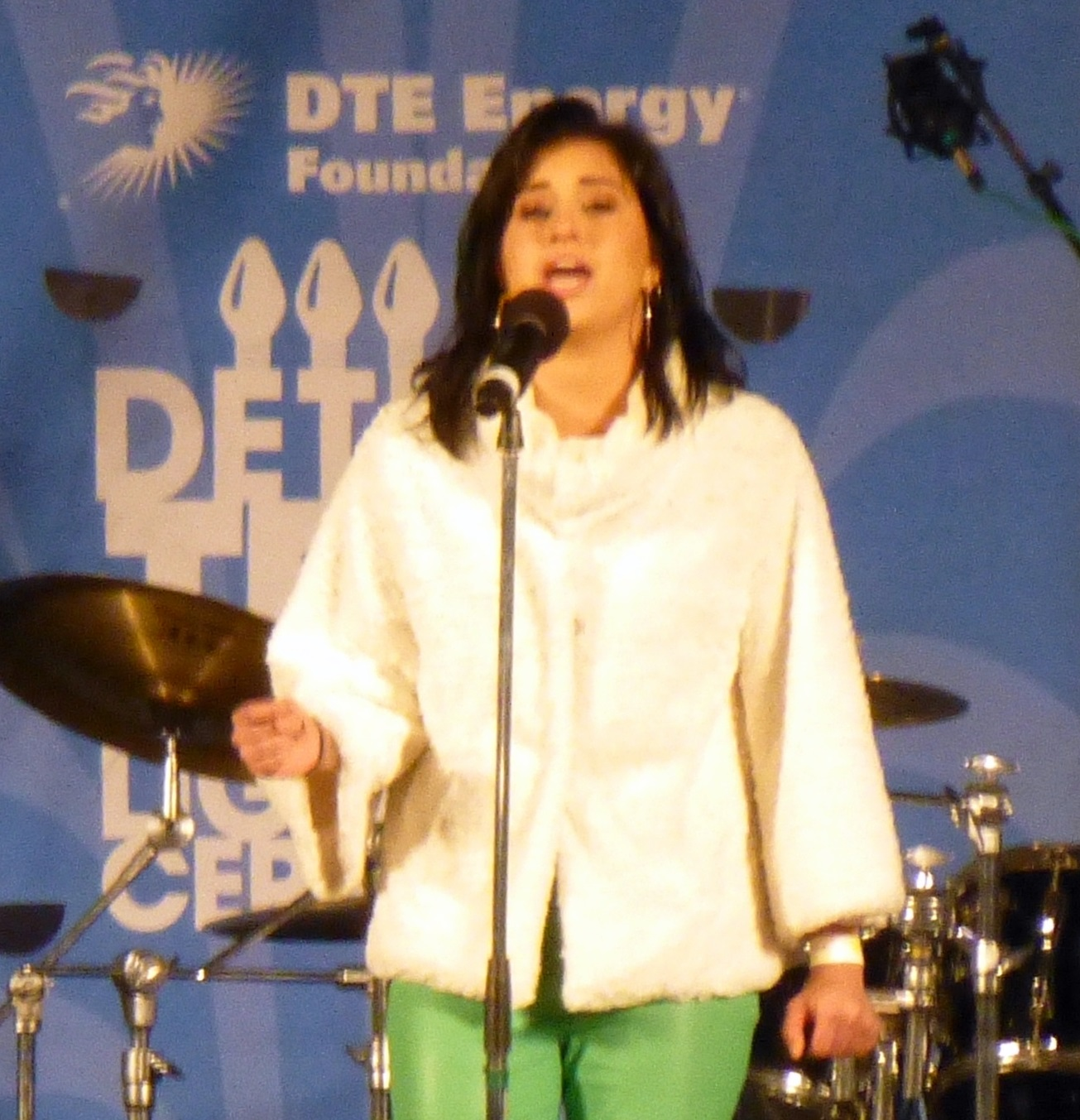
Irene 2014

Asciutto took part in the American Idols Live! Tour 2014 from June 24 through August 24, 2014. She began work on her debut album immediately after the show as well.

In April 2015, Asciutto signed a record deal with Detroit-based label Original 1265 Records. In October 2015, the music video for "Unbreakable" was released. The single would later be on both debut EP, Innocence, which was released on April 22, 2016, and her album, Cold Fame, was released in late 2016. The music video for the second single, "Innocence", was released on April 20, 2016. On April 22, 2016, "You Gotta Help Me", was featured in the Billboard.com Editors' Picks.

== Discography ==
=== Extended plays ===
List of albums, with selected chart positions and certifications
Title	Album details	Peak chart positions
Title	Album details	US Heat
Innocence	Released: April 22, 2016; Label: Original 1265; Format: CD, Digital download	18
Cold Fame	Released: June 2, 2017; Label:Original 1265; Format:CD, Digital download	

=== Singles ===
Title	Year	Peak chart positions	Album
Title	Year	US	Album
"We Are One"	2014	—	—N/a
"Unbreakable"	2016	—	Innocence and Cold Fame
"Innocence"	2016	—	Innocence
"You Gotta Help Me"	2016	—	Innocence

Releases from "American Idol"

- "Clarity"
- "Bring Me to Life"
- "Rolling in the Deep"
- "I Love Rock 'n' Roll"
- "Creep"
- "Barracuda"
- "My Body"
- "Heartbreaker"

=== Music videos ===
Title	Year
"Unbreakable"	2015
"Innocence"	2016
"Floating Down the River"	2017
"So I Get High"	2017
