= Jeff Dotson =

American film director and photographer

- Occupations: Film Director and Photographer
- Known for: VMA Winner

Jeff Dotson is an American film director and photographer from Southern California, who has worked with Enrique Iglesias, Kanye West, Pitbull, Usher, Lil Wayne, Katy Perry, Skrillex, Showtek, Borgeous, Maroon 5, Sander Van Doorn and more. Known for his technical achievements in visual effects and winner of a MTV Video Music Award.

== Biography ==
Jeff studied at the Gnomon School of Visual Effects and at the Art Institute of Santa Monica. He collaborated in the visual effects of Avatar as a visual effects artist.

Dotson is the founder of Dot & Effects, a Visual Effects Company for films, commercials, music videos & television. Throughout his career of more than half a decade Dotson has been featured on Weather Channel, FX Guide and Huffington Post.

== Awards ==
- Dotson won Best Visual Effects at the 2011 VMA's for his work on Katy Perry's ET music video ft. Kanye West.
- In 2013 the video Dirty Dancer won Ev.gerard Video Music Award for Best Male Video.
- Dotson Was nominated for a MTV Video Music Award Best Visual Effects in 2013 for his work on Skrillex's Breakn’ a Sweat.
