= Crystallization (disambiguation) =

Crystallization is the (natural or artificial) formation of highly organized, solid crystals.

Crystallization or Crystallize may also refer to:

- Crystallization (love), a concept defined by Stendhal
- "Crystallize" (Kylie Minogue song)
- "Crystallize" (Lindsey Stirling song)
- "Crystallized" (song), a song by Young the Giant
- "Crystalised", a song by The xx
- "Crystalize", a song by Sonic Syndicate from the album Confessions
- "Crystallised", a song by Haken from the EP Restoration
- Ninjago: Crystalized, the fifteenth season of Ninjago
