= Superposition (song) =

Single by Young the Giant

from the album Mirror Master
- Released: August 23, 2018
- Studio: The Village Studios; The Doghouse Studio
- Genre: Indie rock; indie pop
- Length: 3:50
- Label: Elektra
- Songwriters: Sameer Gadhia; Payam Doostzadeh; Jacob Tilley; Francois Comtois; Eric Cannata
- Producers: Young the Giant; John Hill

Young the Giant singles chronology
"Simplify" (2018)	"Superposition" (2018)	"Heat of the Summer" (2018)

Music video
- "Superposition" on YouTube

"Superposition" is a song by American alternative rock band Young the Giant, promoted as the second single off of the band's fourth album, Mirror Master. It was released on August 23, 2018, through Elektra Records.

== Background and recording ==
Beyond the original version, two remakes were released: the first one was dubbed "Superposition (Reprise)", recorded in a single day in the Layman Drug Company Studio in Nashville, and uploaded to YouTube on January 16, 2019 while the second was named "Superposition (Reflection)" and posted online on April 12, 2019.

On social media posts, the band has described "Superposition" as "a song about quantum physics that has defied odds". On the Reprise version, they stated it is "a deconstructed negative of the original: a flipper zip on the double helix". Furthermore, on the Reflection version, they added it "is about recognizing the constant that hides behind infinite variations".

Unusual in modern popular music, "Superposition" prominently features the sound of a charango.

== Critical reception ==
While parent album Mirror Master received mixed reviews, "Superposition" was generally well-regarded. Neil Yeung, of AllMusic, said it was an album highlight, "the gorgeous opener that balances alluring beats and heartfelt emotion." Chris Bach, of WRBB, called its lyrics "bland" but praised the "unique and dynamic instrumental", adding that it is "the centerpiece of this album". The "extensive physics metaphors" such as "superposition" and "black stars", plus "the atmospheric sound", were emphasized by Kerry Rork of The Chronicle.

== Chart performance ==
Commercially, "Superposition" climbed to number 2 in the US Alternative Songs chart, tying it with "It's About Time" for the highest-charting single to date by the band, while hitting the top spot in the Mediabase Alternative chart. Additionally, the song hit number 10 in the US Rock Songs chart, number 3 in the US Rock Airplay chart, and number 4 in the US Adult Alternative Songs.

== Music video ==
The music video for the track was released on August 23, 2018, the same day it was released as a single. Directed by Computer Team, who also directed "Something To Believe In", it evokes reflection, among other physics-related concepts mentioned throughout the song.

== Usage in media ==
"Superposition" was used in TV shows such as Grey's Anatomy and Roswell, New Mexico, and was made available as a playable song in the video game Rock Band 4.

The band performed the song live on Late Night with Seth Meyers, Jimmy Kimmel Live!, and The Late Show with Stephen Colbert.

== Track listing ==
Superposition (Reflection) EP
No.	Title	Length
1.	"Superposition (Reflection)"	3:30
2.	"Superposition"	3:50
3.	"Superposition (Reprise)"	3:46
Total length:		11:06

== Charts ==
=== Weekly charts ===
Chart (2018–19)	Peak position
Belgium (Ultratip Bubbling Under Wallonia)	–
Canada Rock (Billboard)	28
US Adult Pop Airplay (Billboard)	32
US Hot Rock & Alternative Songs (Billboard)	10
US Rock & Alternative Airplay (Billboard)	3

=== Year-end charts ===
Chart (2019)	Position
US Hot Rock Songs (Billboard)	24
US Rock Airplay Songs (Billboard)	16

== Certifications ==
Region	Certification	Certified units/sales
United States (RIAA)	Gold	500,000^{‡}
^{‡} Sales+streaming figures based on certification alone.
