= Dot & Effects =

Dot & Effects was a visual effect, animation and production studio based in Temecula, California.

It won Katy Perry the Best Video Special Effects Award at the 2011 MTV Video Music Awards. The video E.T. featured Kanye West.

== See also ==
- MTV Video Music Award for Best Special Effects
