= Apartment (Young the Giant song) =

Single by Young the Giant

from the album Young the Giant
- Released: February 13, 2012
- Recorded: 2010
- Genre: Indie rock, alternative rock
- Length: 3:56
- Label: Roadrunner
- Songwriters: Sameer Gadhia, Jacob Tilley, Eric Cannata, Payam Doostzadeh, Francois Comtois
- Producers: Joe Chiccarelli, Young the Giant

Young the Giant singles chronology
"Cough Syrup" (2011)	"Apartment" (2012)	"It's About Time" (2013)

Music video
- "Apartment" on YouTube

"Apartment" is a song by American alternative rock band Young the Giant from their 2010 self-titled debut album. Written by the band and released as a single in 2012, it peaked at number 26 on the Billboard Alternative Songs chart. Two music videos for "Apartment" were filmed, and the song was remixed in 2011 by Captain Cuts.

== Reception ==
Released in February 2012, "Apartment" peaked at number 26 on Billboard's Alternative Songs chart. Consequence of Sound's Caitlin Meyer described the song as "a seemingly average track that quickly crescendos into an impressive showcase of Gadhia’s vocal range." Chris White of musicOMH called it "an instantly infectious slice of quintessentially American alternative rock." In 2011, Young the Giant performed the song on Jimmy Kimmel Live! (January), on Later... with Jools Holland (May), and on MTV's Unplugged: Young the Giant, which began streaming online in November. A remixed version of the song by Captain Cuts appeared on Young the Giant's Remix EP, released in 2011.

== Music videos ==
A music video for "Apartment" filmed in a semi-live performance style was released early in 2011. A new video for the song premiered across all MTV networks in April 2012. The clip features Young the Giant and friends on an old RV making stops to go surfing, celebrate a birthday, skinny dip, and watch a bonfire. Another video, directed by Alexander Shahmiri, was filmed for an "In the Open" session and features the band performing an acoustic version of the song.

== Vinyl 7" ==
A 7" Vinyl was released on Record Store Day in 2011 featuring "Apartment" on side A, and B-side "Typhoon". This is the only physical release of Typhoon.

== Charts ==
Chart (2012)	Peak position
US Alternative Songs (Billboard)	26
