= 2011 MTV Video Music Awards =

Award ceremony

- Date: Sunday, August 28, 2011
- Location: Nokia Theatre (Los Angeles, California)
- Country: United States
- Most awards: Katy Perry and Adele (3 each)
- Most nominations: Katy Perry (10)
- Website: www.mtv.com/vma/2011/

Television/radio coverage
- Network: MTV and VH1
- Produced by: Amy Doyle; Garrett English; Jesse Ignjatovic; Dave Sirulnick
- Directed by: Hamish Hamilton

The 2011 MTV Video Music Awards took place on August 28, 2011 at the Nokia Theatre in Los Angeles, honoring the best music videos from the previous year. On July 20, the nominees were announced. Katy Perry received the most nominations this year at ten, followed by Adele, and Kanye West, who were both tied at seven. A Britney Spears tribute was held, consisting of adult and children dancers alike, they wore costumes based on the music videos of Spears. Hamish Hamilton directed the show.

At the ceremony, Katy Perry won three awards, including top prize Video of the Year for "Firework". Adele also won three awards, all in the technical fields, including Best Cinematography, Best Art Direction and Best Editing for "Rolling in the Deep". Britney Spears won a total of two awards, Best Pop Video for her single "Till the World Ends" and the Michael Jackson Video Vanguard Award for her influence and impact in music. Lady Gaga also won two awards, including Best Female Video for "Born This Way". Other winners included Beyoncé, Justin Bieber, Tyler, the Creator, Nicki Minaj, Kanye West (shared with Perry), Foo Fighters, and the Beastie Boys who all won one apiece.

During the awards ceremony, Beyoncé revealed that she was pregnant with her first child, when she ended her performance of "Love on Top" (2011). The Huffington Post later confirmed that Knowles was five-months pregnant and her pregnancy announcement had broken the "most tweets per second recorded for a single event" Twitter record, receiving 8,868 tweets per second. MTV reported that Knowles' performance of "Love on Top" and the announcement of her pregnancy at the awards ceremony combined with Britney Spears tribute helped 2011's MTV Video Music Awards become the most-watched broadcast in MTV history, pulling in 12.4 million viewers. In addition, data from Google Insights showed that the most searched for term from August 29, 2011 to September 4, 2011 was "Beyonce pregnant" which reached "breakout" levels – a term used by Google to describe a search with an increase of over 5,000%.

== Performances ==
Performer(s)	Song(s)
Pre-show
Cobra Starship; Sabi	"You Make Me Feel..."
Main show
Lady Gaga; Brian May	"Yoü and I"
Jay-Z; Kanye West	"Otis"
Pitbull; Ne-Yo; Nayer	"Give Me Everything"
Adele	"Someone Like You"
Chris Brown	"Yeah 3x" "Beautiful People"
Dance tribute to Britney Spears	"...Baby One More Time" "Oops!... I Did It Again" "Stronger" (interlude) "(You Drive Me) Crazy" (interlude) "Toxic" "Circus" "Me Against the Music" "Hold It Against Me" (interlude) "I'm a Slave 4 U" "Till the World Ends"
Beyoncé	"Love on Top"
Young the Giant	"My Body"
Bruno Mars	Tribute to Amy Winehouse “Valerie”
Lil Wayne	"How to Love" "John"

House artist

- Jessie J:

"Price Tag"
"Girls Just Want to Have Fun"
"Do It Like a Dude"
"Rainbow"
"Firework"
"Domino"
"No Scrubs"
"Who's Laughing Now"
"Forget You"
"Nobody's Perfect"
"Mamma Knows Best"

== Presenters ==
=== Pre-show ===
- Sway Calloway and the cast of Awkward (Ashley Rickards, Beau Mirchoff and Brett Davern) – presented Best Video with a Message

=== Main show ===
- Kevin Hart – opened the show and introduced the first set of presenters
- Jonah Hill and Nicki Minaj – presented Best Pop Video
- Miley Cyrus and Shaun White – presented Best Rock Video
- Will Ferrell, Seth Rogen, Jack Black (as the Beastie Boys) and Odd Future – presented Best Hip-Hop Video
- Beavis and Butt-Head and Nicki Minaj - performed a comedy sketch
- Demi Lovato and Chord Overstreet – presented Best Collaboration
- Rick Ross and Paul Rudd – introduced Pitbull, Ne-Yo and Nayer
- Katy Perry – introduced Adele
- Kim Kardashian – presented Best Male Video
- Joe Jonas and Victoria Justice – introduced Chris Brown
- Lady Gaga (as Jo Calderone) – introduced the Britney Spears tribute performance and presented the Michael Jackson Video Vanguard award
- Britney Spears and Lady Gaga – introduced Beyoncé
- Selena Gomez and Taylor Lautner – presented Best New Artist
- Jared Leto and Zoe Saldaña – introduced Young the Giant
- Cloris Leachman, Sammi Giancola, Snooki, Deena Nicole Cortese and JWoww – presented Best Female Video
- Russell Brand – presented the Amy Winehouse tribute introducing Tony Bennett and Bruno Mars
- Tony Bennett – introduced a clip of his recording sessions with Amy Winehouse
- Jennifer Lawrence – introduced a clip of The Hunger Games
- Katie Holmes – presented Video of the Year
- Drake – introduced Lil Wayne

== Winners and nominees ==
Nominees were announced on July 20, 2011. Winners are in bold.

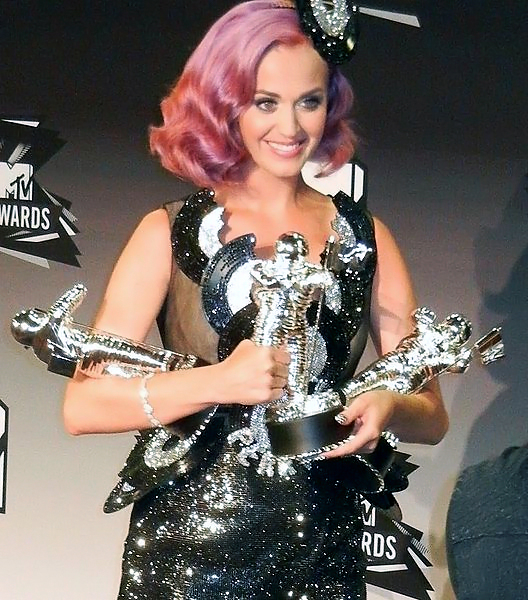
Katy Perry with her awards, including Video of the Year

Video of the Year	Best Male Video
**Katy Perry – "Firework"**; Adele – "Rolling in the Deep"; Beastie Boys – "Make Some Noise"; Bruno Mars – "Grenade"; Tyler, the Creator – "Yonkers"	**Justin Bieber – "U Smile"**; Eminem (featuring Rihanna) – "Love the Way You Lie"; Cee-Lo Green – "Fuck You"; Bruno Mars – "Grenade"; Kanye West (featuring Rihanna and Kid Cudi) – "All of the Lights"
Best Female Video	Best New Artist
**Lady Gaga – "Born This Way"**; Adele – "Rolling in the Deep"; Beyoncé – "Run the World (Girls)"; Nicki Minaj – "Super Bass"; Katy Perry – "Firework"	**Tyler, The Creator – "Yonkers"**; Big Sean (featuring Chris Brown) – "My Last"; Foster the People – "Pumped Up Kicks"; Kreayshawn – "Gucci Gucci"; Wiz Khalifa – "Black and Yellow"
Best Pop Video	Best Rock Video
**Britney Spears – "Till the World Ends"**; Adele – "Rolling in the Deep"; Bruno Mars – "Grenade"; Katy Perry – "Last Friday Night (T.G.I.F.)"; Pitbull (featuring Ne-Yo, Nayer and Afrojack) – "Give Me Everything"	**Foo Fighters – "Walk"**; The Black Keys – "Howlin' for You"; Cage the Elephant – "Shake Me Down"; Foster the People – "Pumped Up Kicks"; Mumford & Sons – "The Cave"
Best Hip-Hop Video	Best Collaboration
**Nicki Minaj – "Super Bass"**; Chris Brown (featuring Lil Wayne and Busta Rhymes) – "Look at Me Now"; Lupe Fiasco – "The Show Goes On"; Lil Wayne (featuring Cory Gunz) – "6 Foot 7 Foot"; Kanye West (featuring Rihanna and Kid Cudi) – "All of the Lights"	**Katy Perry (featuring Kanye West) – "E.T."**; Chris Brown (featuring Lil Wayne and Busta Rhymes) – "Look at Me Now"; Nicki Minaj (featuring Drake) – "Moment 4 Life"; Pitbull (featuring Ne-Yo, Nayer, and Afrojack) – "Give Me Everything"; Kanye West (featuring Rihanna and Kid Cudi) – "All of the Lights"
Best Direction	Best Choreography
**Beastie Boys – "Make Some Noise" (Director: Adam Yauch)**; Adele – "Rolling in the Deep" (Director: Sam Brown); Eminem (featuring Rihanna) – "Love the Way You Lie" (Director: Joseph Kahn); Katy Perry (featuring Kanye West) – "E.T." (Director: Floria Sigismondi); Thirty Seconds to Mars – "Hurricane" (Director: Bartholomew Cubbins)	**Beyoncé – "Run the World (Girls)" (Choreographer: Frank Gatson, Sheryl Murakami and Jeffrey Page)**; Lady Gaga – "Judas" (Choreographer: Laurieann Gibson); LMFAO (featuring Lauren Bennett and GoonRock) – "Party Rock Anthem" (Choreographer: Hokuto Konishi); Bruno Mars – "The Lazy Song" (Choreographers: Bruno Mars and Poreotics); Britney Spears – "Till the World Ends" (Choreographer: Brian Friedman)
Best Special Effects	Best Art Direction
**Katy Perry (featuring Kanye West) – "E.T." (Special Effects: Jeff Dotson for Dot & Effects)**; Chromeo – "Don't Turn the Lights On" (Special Effects: The Mill); Linkin Park – "Waiting for the End" (Special Effects: Ghost Town Media); Manchester Orchestra – "Simple Math" (Special Effects: DANIELS); Kanye West (featuring Dwele) – "Power" (Special Effects: Nice Shoes and ArtJail)	**Adele – "Rolling in the Deep" (Art Director: Nathan Parker)**; Death Cab for Cutie – "You Are a Tourist" (Art Directors: Nick Gould, Tim Nackashi and Anthony Maitz); Lady Gaga – "Judas" (Art Director: Amy Danger); Katy Perry (featuring Kanye West) – "E.T." (Art Director: Jason Fijal); Kanye West (featuring Dwele) – "Power" (Art Director: Babak Radboy)
Best Editing	Best Cinematography
**Adele – "Rolling in the Deep" (Editor: Art Jones at Work)**; Manchester Orchestra – "Simple Math" (Editors: DANIELS); Katy Perry (featuring Kanye West) – "E.T." (Editor: Jarrett Fijal); Thirty Seconds to Mars – "Hurricane" (Editors: Jared Leto, Frank Snider, Michael Bryson, Stefanie Visser and Daniel Carberry); Kanye West (featuring Rihanna and Kid Cudi) – "All of the Lights" (Editor: Hadaya Turner)	**Adele – "Rolling in the Deep" (Director of Photography: Tom Townend)**; Beyoncé – "Run the World (Girls)" (Director of Photography: Jeffrey Kimball); Eminem (featuring Rihanna) – "Love the Way You Lie" (Director of Photography: Christopher Probst); Katy Perry – "Teenage Dream" (Director of Photography: Paul Laufer); Thirty Seconds to Mars – "Hurricane" (Directors of Photography: Benoît Debie, Jared Leto, Rob Witt and Daniel Carberry)
Best Video with a Message	Best Latino Artist
**Lady Gaga – "Born This Way"**; Eminem (featuring Rihanna) – "Love the Way You Lie"; Katy Perry – "Firework"; Pink – "Fuckin' Perfect"; Rise Against – "Make It Stop (September's Children)"; Taylor Swift – "Mean"	**Wisin & Yandel – "Zun Zun Rompiendo Caderas"**; Don Omar and Lucenzo – "Danza Kuduro"; Enrique Iglesias (featuring Ludacris and DJ Frank E) – "Tonight (I'm Lovin' You)"; Maná – "Lluvia al Corazón"; Prince Royce – "Corazón Sin Cara"
Michael Jackson Video Vanguard Award
**Britney Spears**

== Artists with multiple wins and nominations ==
Artists who received multiple awards
Wins	Artist
3	Adele
3	Katy Perry
2	Britney Spears
2	Lady Gaga

Artists who received multiple nominations
Nominations	Artist
10	Katy Perry
7	Adele
6	Kanye West
4	Bruno Mars
4	Eminem
4	Lady Gaga
3	Beyoncé
3	Nicki Minaj
3	Thirty Seconds to Mars
2	Beastie Boys
2	Britney Spears
2	Chris Brown
2	Foster the People
2	Manchester Orchestra
2	Pitbull
2	Tyler, the Creator

== Music Videos with multiple wins and nominations ==
Music Videos that received multiple awards
Wins	Artist	Music Video
3	Adele	"Rolling in the Deep"
2	Katy Perry (featuring Kanye West)	"E.T."
2	Lady Gaga	"Born This Way"

Music Videos that received multiple nominations
Nominations	Artist	Music Video
7	Adele	"Rolling in the Deep"
5	Katy Perry (featuring Kanye West)	"E.T."
4	Eminem (featuring Rihanna)	"Love the Way You Lie"
4	Kanye West (featuring Rihanna and Kid Cudi)	"All of the Lights"
3	Beyoncé	"Run the World (Girls)"
3	Bruno Mars	"Grenade"
3	Katy Perry	"Firework"
3	Thirty Seconds to Mars	"Hurricane"
2	Beastie Boys	"Make Some Noise"
2	Britney Spears	"Till the World Ends"
2	Chris Brown (featuring Lil Wayne and Busta Rhymes)	"Look at Me Now"
2	Foster the People	"Pumped Up Kicks"
2	Kanye West (featuring Dwele)	"Power"
2	Lady Gaga	"Born This Way"
2	Lady Gaga	"Judas"
2	Manchester Orchestra	"Simple Math"
2	Nicki Minaj	"Super Bass"
2	Pitbull (featuring Ne-Yo, Nayer, and Afrojack)	"Give Me Everything"
2	Tyler, the Creator	"Yonkers"

== See also ==
- 2011 MTV Europe Music Awards
