= Home of the Strange =

Studio album by Young the Giant
- Released: August 12, 2016
- Genres: Indie rock; alternative rock; indie pop
- Length: 39:50
- Label: Fueled by Ramen
- Producers: Jeff Bhasker, Alex Salibian

Young the Giant chronology
Mind over Matter (2014)	Home of the Strange (2016)	Mirror Master (2018)

Singles from Home of the Strange
- 1. "Amerika" Released: April 15, 2016; 2. "Something to Believe In" Released: May 10, 2016; 3. "Titus Was Born" Released: June 17, 2016; 4. "Silvertongue" Released: September 2016

Home of the Strange is the third studio album by American alternative rock band Young the Giant, released by Fueled by Ramen on August 12, 2016.

== Promotion ==
On April 15, 2016, the band released "Amerika" as an announcement track to the new album. The next song to be released, "Something to Believe In", was released as the first official radio single from the album. On May 16, 2016, they announced the Home of the Strange Tour, which started in the West Coast on August 13, and toured around the US. Three additional tracks, "Titus Was Born", "Jungle Youth" and "Silvertongue (Brief) (Demo)", were released the weeks preceding the release of Home of the Strange.

== Lyrics ==
Home of the Strange deals with the band's immigrant history and American identity. Lead singer Sameer Gadhia is a first generation American of Indian heritage. The track "Amerika" was inspired by Franz Kafka's unfinished novel of the same name.

== Reception ==
Professional ratings
Aggregate scores
Source	Rating
Metacritic	76/100
Review scores
Source	Rating
Allmusic	4/5 stars

Home of the Strange garnered mostly positive reviews. Entertainment Weekly commented that the band found more substance for the album: "the group ascends from the third-tier trenches that waylaid their early career, dishing out their richest and most varied project to date." Rolling Stone praised the timing of the album with the heated politics of 2016, writing "the band's third album comes at a time when hyphenated Americans are reminded daily of their status. The lyrics of Home of the Strange reflect that, taking a stance while yet referencing a complex, ongoing identity crisis." However, Rolling Stone pointed out the band's "longstanding musical identity crisis". Allmusic commented that the album was "their funkiest offering to date."

== Track listing ==
No.	Title	Length
1.	"Amerika"	4:00
2.	"Something to Believe In"	3:48
3.	"Elsewhere"	3:44
4.	"Mr. Know-It-All"	3:11
5.	"Jungle Youth"	3:40
6.	"Titus Was Born"	4:02
7.	"Repeat"	3:05
8.	"Silvertongue (Panties)"	3:17
9.	"Art Exhibit"	4:03
10.	"Nothing's Over"	4:24
11.	"Home of the Strange"	2:36

== Personnel ==
- Sameer Gadhia - lead vocals, percussion, ukulele, organ, electric guitar
- Eric Cannata - electric guitar, acoustic guitar, piano, synths, additional vocals, percussion
- Francois Comtois - drums, percussion, additional vocals, piano, synths
- Jacob Tilley - electric guitar, acoustic guitar, synths, vibraphone
- Payam Doostzadeh - bass, piano, synths
- Alex Salibian - additional electric guitar, piano, synths, vocals
- Additional singers: Alexandra Govere, Gabrielle Walter-Clay, Nilu Madadi, Nora Riegels, Sonia Gadhia

== Charts ==
=== Album ===
Chart (2016)	Peak position
Australia (ARIA Hitseekers)	7
Belgian Albums (Ultratop Flanders)	176
Canadian Albums (Billboard)	17
Dutch Albums (Album Top 100)	91
New Zealand Heatseekers Albums (RMNZ)	2
US Billboard 200	12
