= Something to Believe In (Young the Giant song) =

2016 single by Young the Giant

- Official live acoustic performance artwork

Single by Young the Giant

from the album Home of the Strange
- Released: May 10, 2016
- Genre: Indie rock; alternative rock
- Length: 3:48
- Label: Fueled by Ramen
- Songwriters: Sameer Gadhia; Jacob Tilley; Eric Cannata; Payam Doostzadeh; Francois Comtois; Alex Salibian
- Producers: Jeff Bhasker; Salibian

Young the Giant singles chronology
"Amerika" (2016)	"Something to Believe In" (2016)	"Titus Was Born" (2016)

Music video
- "Something to Believe In" on YouTube

"Something to Believe In" is a song by American alternative rock band Young the Giant. It was released on May 10, 2016 as the second single and first official radio single from their third studio album Home of the Strange (2016). It peaked at number 9 on the Billboard Alternative Songs chart.

== Background ==
The song has a theme of finding one's own path and having to defy expectations from others in order to do so. In an interview with NPR, lead singer Sameer Gadhia discussed how the song relates to his own experience of dropping out of college to pursue his music career.

== Composition ==
The instrumental of the song includes "a prickly riff emitting Eastern European undertones". Gadhia's voice has been described as becoming "raspy and gritty as he hits the high notes".

== Critical reception ==
Writing for Euphoria Magazine, Kenneth Ong praised the song, saying that "If this is a sign for what is to come, we are in for a surprise, a pleasant one at that." Critics Pryor Stroud, Chris Ingalls and Chad Miller of PopMatters all reviewed the song; Stroud gave a critical response, writing, "It's a prototypical Young the Giant track through and through, replete with chugging guitars, no-frills indie rock production, and a cloud-clutching chorus." In contrast, Ingalls responded favorably, writing, "It sounds classic and well-crafted without stooping to disposable pop levels." Miller's review was more mixed, praising the melody but deeming the song "a little bit unoriginal".

== Charts ==
Chart (2016)	Peak position
Canada Rock (Billboard)	21
US Hot Rock & Alternative Songs (Billboard)	24
US Rock & Alternative Airplay (Billboard)	9
