= Young the Giant (album) =

Studio album by Young the Giant
- Released: October 26, 2010
- Genres: Indie rock, alternative rock
- Length: 50:48
- Label: Roadrunner
- Producers: Joe Chiccarelli, Young the Giant

Young the Giant chronology
Young the Giant (2010)	Mind Over Matter (2014)

Singles from Young the Giant
- 1. "My Body" Released: January 10, 2011; 2. "Cough Syrup" Released: July 12, 2011; 3. "Apartment" Released: February 13, 2012

Young the Giant is the debut album by American indie rock band Young the Giant. It was released digitally by the Roadrunner record label on October 26, 2010, and was followed by a physical CD and vinyl release in the United States on January 25, 2011. The album was released in the United Kingdom on May 2, 2011.

The band began work on the album with producer Joe Chiccarelli, engineers Lars Fox and Ian Kirkpatrick, and mixer Michael H. Brauer in early 2010. Young the Giant lead singer Sameer Gadhia described the album as having a "summery, kind of an Orange County sound." Songs on the album include the U.S. single "My Body", which reached the top five of Billboard's Alternative Songs chart; "Apartment", the first international single; and "Cough Syrup", which was originally recorded for the 2008 EP Shake My Hand when the band was known as The Jakes.

== Background ==
Following the departure of keyboardist Ehson Hashemian in late 2009, rock group The Jakes changed its name to Young the Giant. Lead singer Sameer Gadhia said the new band name did not have any specific meaning, but that it epitomized the band they had become. "I was thinking about what we want to portray," Gadhia said. "We are still youthful, but when we aren't, we still want to have that exuberance in our music."

In early 2010, Young the Giant began work on its debut album with Grammy-winning producer Joe Chiccarelli. The album features live track recording, which the band had never previously attempted. Drummer Francois Comtois noted that working with Chiccarelli for the sessions "was incredibly intimidating, but he kicked our asses into shape." Gadhia also recalled the experience: "We were criticized in ways we had never even thought of, and were constantly pushed to reach the next level. Looking back on it, [...] he shaped us into better musicians, performers, and songwriters. It was also great fun hearing his stories about Bono, Jay-Z and Elton John."

== Composition ==
"For me, the lyrics process is a mix of conscious substance and nonsensical spontaneity. Sometimes the most heartfelt lyrics come directly from the subconscious without the need of thinking. Often, I start with one true phrase or line of a song. From there, I extend the phrase into a whole story; one that I might have been a part of, or perhaps one I imagined a fictional Porn Star. Often, these stories tell of secret inhibitions and the desire to break from self-imposed walls. Sometimes they are just good old-fashioned love stories."

— Sameer Gadhia on his songwriting style

An underlying theme of the album, according to Gadhia, is the "feeling of isolation and almost surreal happiness with a lover." Much of the album was inspired by the beach, Gadhia said. "It is summery, kind of an Orange County sound. When we first started doing this seriously and living together, Newport was just like eternal summer for us. We did draw from a lot of that." In particular, the track "Strings" is an attempt to showcase the sounds of the beach. Gadhia described that the band wanted to "have the arrangements cascade together and, tonally, we all worked hard with Joe to recreate the fervor and wetness of splashing waves."

Gadhia said the track "My Body" is an embodiment of the band: "a combination of youthful energy and slightly naive but optimistic determination. It captures a sense of passion, urgency and excitement that we've felt throughout the writing and recording process over the past two years." Another song, "Cough Syrup", was co-written by former bandmate Ehson Hashemian and dates back to the 2008 EP "Shake My Hand", when the band was still known as The Jakes.

== Release ==
Three tracks - "My Body", "I Got" and "Strings" - were leaked individually prior to the album's October 26, 2010 digital release. Young the Giant was released on CD and vinyl in the United States on January 25, 2011. It debuted and peaked at number six on the Billboard Top Heatseekers albums chart. First U.S. single "My Body" peaked at number eight on the Alternative Songs chart. The album was released May 2 in the UK, with "Apartment" as the lead international single. The album peaked at number 83 on the UK Albums Chart.

== Reception ==
Professional ratings
Aggregate scores
Source	Rating
Metacritic	58/100
Review scores
Source	Rating
AllMusic	3/5 stars
ChartAttack	3.5/5 stars
Consequence of Sound	4.5/5 stars
Drowned in Sound	6/10 stars
musicOMH	2.5/5 stars
Pitchfork	2.7/10
PopMatters	5/10
Spin	7/10

Young the Giant has received mixed reviews from critics. It holds a score of 58/100 based on thirteen reviews on Metacritic, indicating "mixed or average" reviews. Jody McCutcheon of ChartAttack described the album as having "12 songs rich in texture and progression, vocal hooks and catchy guitar riffs," and said the band "suffuse their sound with a thick, juicy ecstasy." Caitlin Meyer commends the album for "boasting consistent catchiness while also incorporating a delectable combination of continuity, depth, and progression." Meyer added it is "the kind of record that grabs you at first listen and becomes more meaningful every time through." David Menconi of Spin compliments the manner in which "Sameer Gadhia sings in a declara-tive key of unwavering determination, undergirded by Jacob Tilley's sophisticated guitar sprawl and Francois Comtois' martial drums as the band's debut album goes marching on and on and on." Amazon.com ranked Young the Giant as the third best rock album of 2010.

Chris Conaton of PopMatters called the album unoriginal, and that the band knows "how to replicate the strong moments in rock history. But they have yet to really figure out their own stylistic stamp." Pitchfork's Ian Cohen called the album "devoid of personality," explaining that "politely distorted guitars twist and churn but never turn into riffs. Choruses become placeholders instead of hooks." Cohen also criticized the lyrics for being "neither plainspoken enough to reveal simple truths nor evocative enough to scan as poetry."

British artist Morrissey, known for outspoken skepticism towards modern music, praised the album on the fansite True to You.

== Track listing ==
All tracks are written by Young the Giant, except where noted.

No.	Title	Length
1.	"Apartment"	3:56
2.	"My Body"	4:05
3.	"I Got"	4:22
4.	"Cough Syrup" (Ehson Hashemian, Young the Giant)	4:10
5.	"God Made Man"	4:48
6.	"12 Fingers" (Mike Daly, Young the Giant)	4:17
7.	"Strings"	4:12
8.	"Your Side"	3:52
9.	"Garands"	4:07
10.	"St. Walker"	4:09
11.	"Islands"	4:06
12.	"Guns Out"	4:44

Special edition bonus tracks
No.	Title	Length
13.	"Every Little Thing"	4:02
14.	"Typhoon"	4:12
15.	"Strings" (reprise)	5:19

== Personnel ==
Young the Giant

- Sameer Gadhia – percussion, lead vocals
- Jacob Tilley – guitar
- Eric Cannata – guitar, backing vocals
- Payam Doostzadeh – bass guitar
- François Comtois – drums, percussion, backing vocals

Additional

- Sean Fischer – cello
- Ehson Hashemian – keyboards, backing vocals
- Bo Koster – keyboards
- Roger Manning – keyboards
- Invisible Creature – album art

== Charts and certifications ==
Chart (2011–12)	Peak position
Dutch Albums (Album Top 100)	29
Italian Albums (FIMI)	52
Scottish Albums (Official Charts)	84
UK Albums (OCC)	83
US Billboard 200	42
US Top Alternative Albums (Billboard)	6
US Heatseekers Albums (Billboard)	2
US Top Rock Albums (Billboard)	6

=== Certifications ===
Region	Certification	Certified units/sales
United States (RIAA)	Gold	500,000^{‡}
^{‡} Sales+streaming figures based on certification alone.

=== Singles ===
Title	Year	Peak chart positions								Certifications
Title	Year	US	US Alt	US Rock	CAN	CAN Alt	CAN Rock	ITA	NLD	Certifications
"My Body"	2011	65	5	16	54	2	3	—	24	US: Platinum; CAN: Platinum
"Cough Syrup"	2011	95	3	9	82	5	20	11	95	US: 2× Platinum; CAN: Gold; ITA: Platinum
"Apartment"	2012	—	26	—	—	—	—	—	—	
"—" denotes release that has not charted.

== Release history ==
Region	Date	Format	Label
United States	October 26, 2010	Digital download	Roadrunner
United States	January 25, 2011	CD, vinyl	Roadrunner
United Kingdom	May 2, 2011	CD, vinyl	Roadrunner
