= Innocence (Jena Irene Asciutto EP) =

EP by Jena Irene Asciutto
- Released: April 22, 2016
- Recorded: 2016
- Genre: Pop
- Length: 21:00

Innocence is the debut extended play (EP) by American singer-songwriter Jena Irene Asciutto. It was released through Detroit-based label Original 1265 Recordings on April 22, 2016. Innocence serves as her first release after becoming the runner-up on the thirteenth season of American Idol.

== Development ==
In April 2015, Asciutto had officially signed to Original 1265 for a long-term recording contract. The first song released from the EP was also performed on American Idol, "Unbreakable", along with the release of a YouTube video. All of the songs on the EP are written by Asciutto. The tracks on the EP were written and recorded after Asciutto spent six months living in Hollywood as a contestant on American Idol, ultimately placing as the runner-up. She also had stated "The songs on Innocence are deeply personal, telling the story of me growing up and finding my way as both a woman and a singer/songwriter." Prior to the EP release, the "Innocence" music video was released.

== Track listing ==
No.	Title	Length
1.	"Innocence"	3:59
2.	"You Gotta Help Me"	4:20
3.	"Numb"	4:11
4.	"Wait"	4:07
5.	"Unbreakable"	5:00
Total length:		21:00

== Chart performance ==
Chart (2016)	Peak position
US Heetseeker Albums (Billboard)	18
