= Mirror Master (album) =

2018 studio album by Young the Giant

Studio album by Young the Giant
- Released: October 12, 2018
- Genre: Indie rock
- Length: 44:42
- Label: Elektra
- Producer: Alex Salibian

Young the Giant chronology
Home of the Strange (2016)	Mirror Master (2018)	American Bollywood (2022)

Singles from Mirror Master
- 1. "Simplify" Released: June 14, 2018; 2. "Superposition" Released: August 23, 2018; 3. "Heat of the Summer" Released: September 21, 2018; 4. "Call Me Back" Released: October 5, 2018

Mirror Master is the fourth studio album by the American alternative rock band Young the Giant. It was released on October 12, 2018, through Elektra Records.

== Background ==
If their previous album, Home of the Strange, is about the political issues in America, then Mirror Master is quite clearly about the personal—the internal. In an interview with billboard.com, Sameer Gadhia, lead vocalist and lyricist, explains this more in depth.

The name Mirror Master comes from the idea that "You look at yourself in the mirror every day and you see a different version of yourself". Gadhia goes on to explain:

You're not just this static thing. You encompass everything. In order to make any change in the world, you need to be okay with yourself first and all those different characters of who you are. You see everyone putting their best foot forward on their socials and look like a different version of themselves, [but] that's just one dimension of who they are. In reality, all of us harbor anxiety, sadness [and] depression. We want to embrace all sides of who every person is and be vulnerable in that. You are master of your own image.

In tracks such as "Superposition", "Call Me Back", and "You + I", Sameer explores relationships and the contrast between the bliss and the complexities one can find therein. Meanwhile, in "Heat of the Summer", and "Glory", Gadhia takes on the beast: himself. "That was probably one of the most self-effacing, most vulnerable lyrics that I wrote for the record," explains Gadhia, on "Glory".

== Critical reception ==
Giving it 3 out of 5 stars, Neil Z. Yeung of AllMusic wrote that "Although Mirror Master drifts along without making much of an impression, there's enough to sate fans and warrant a listen."

== Track listing ==
All tracks written by Eric Cannata, Francois Comtois, Payam Doostzadeh, Sameer Gadhia, and Jacob Tilley. Additional writers are indicated below.

No.	Title	Writer(s)	Producer	Length
1.	"Superposition"		Young the Giant • John Hill	3:50
2.	"Simplify"	Ammar Malik • Andrew Wells	Alex Salibian	3:32
3.	"Call Me Back"	Malik • Hill	Hill	3:57
4.	"Heat of the Summer"	Hill	Hill	3:31
5.	"Oblivion"	David Andrew Sitek	Sitek	3:48
6.	"Darkest Shade of Blue"	Salibian	Young the Giant	2:13
7.	"Brother's Keeper"	Hill	Hill	4:10
8.	"Glory"		Young the Giant • Stefan Mac	3:18
9.	"Tightrope"	Mike Elizondo	Salibian	3:58
10.	"Panoramic Girl"	Hill	Hill	4:02
11.	"You + I"	Salibian	Salibian	4:14
12.	"Mirror Master"		Salibian	4:09
Total length:				44:42

== Charts ==
Chart (2018)	Peak position
US Billboard 200	69
