= Cough Syrup (song) =

Single by Young the Giant

from the album Young the Giant
- Released: July 12, 2011 (radio)
- Recorded: 2008
- Genre: Indie rock; alternative rock
- Length: 4:10
- Label: Roadrunner
- Songwriters: Sameer Gadhia; Jacob Tilley; Eric Cannata; Francois Comtois; Ehson Hashemian
- Producers: Joe Chiccarelli; Young the Giant

Young the Giant singles chronology
"My Body" (2011)	"Cough Syrup" (2011)	"Apartment" (2012)

Music video
- "Cough Syrup" on YouTube

"Cough Syrup" is a song by American alternative rock band Young the Giant from their eponymous debut album. It was composed when the band was named The Jakes, and first appeared on their 2008 EP Shake My Hand. Released by Young The Giant as a single in 2011, the song peaked at number three on the Billboard Alternative Songs chart.

== Origins and lyrics ==
"Cough Syrup" predates Young the Giant, when the band was known as The Jakes. The song appeared on the band's 2008 Shake My Hand EP, received regular airplay on KROQ's Locals Only radio program, and won a "Best Song" nomination at the 2009 OC Music Awards.

Lead vocalist Sameer Gadhia explained that "Cough Syrup" was written at a time when the band was unsigned, had no money and "didn't really know what to do with [themselves]." The group, he continued, "felt somewhat oppressed by the universal expectation of what to do in Orange County...in suburbia in general. I think we really yearned to break out of that and do something a little bit different." Gadhia said the song is "kind of a cry for help" to "break free, not necessarily from oppression, but the common symptoms of suburbia like boredom, normality and homogeneity."

Bassist Payam Doostzadeh, in a 2011 interview, said that with "Cough Syrup" being the oldest song in Young the Giant's catalog, "it's kind of hard for us to play it." Doostzadeh added, "I mean, we've had it for four years and it's just now getting on the radio? But our fans don't know that."

== Music video ==
The music video for "Cough Syrup" debuted June 21, 2011 on MTV and played at the top of each music hour beginning at 6 a.m. Directed by Petro, it features the band in an indoor swimming pool complex along with synchronized swimmers, fish tanks, glitter and fluorescent dyes. According to Gadhia, the band "wanted more of a visual aspect to the music video because "My Body" was more of a narrative. We wanted something that would pop but still make thematic and artistic sense." The video concept, Gadhia said, centered on viscosity, "the friction of fluids and the obstacles that everyone, any object, has to face in order to evolve."

== Critical reception ==
Consequence of Sound's Caitlin Meyer, in a review of the Young the Giant album, wrote of the song: "Mellow guitar and cello contrast the sunny preceding tracks, the lyrics contemplate apathy and misdirection, and yet the chorus is still so compelling that you find yourself humming it hours later." Both Chris Conaton of PopMatters and Eduardo Rivadavia of Allmusic described "Cough Syrup" as being stylistically similar to Coldplay's typical sound. Conaton added that the song is "good, but it seems to follow the script on 'how to do anthemic rock' exactly." Rolling Stone's Matt Ross called "Cough Syrup" an "album highlight", while Chris White of musicOMH suggested the song is influenced by Kings of Leon.

== Cover versions and remixes ==
Darren Criss' character Blaine Anderson covered the song on the season three episode of Glee titled "On My Way" during a scene when closeted football player Dave Karofsky (Max Adler) attempts suicide after being outed as gay. Young the Giant was satisfied with the song's placement in the show's suicide scene. "I don't think we ever had the intent of the song... in such a serious scene," Gadhia told Billboard. "It's very, very intense, very, very impactful, and we most definitely empathized with that. All of us have been victims of bullying -- and been bullies at some point in time. It's something that hits everyone."

Ra Ra Riot remixed "Cough Syrup" for Young The Giant's Remix EP, released in September 2011.

The song was also covered by Melanie Martinez in Season 3 of the American version of The Voice during the Top 12 Live Performances episode. The song was again covered on The Voice in 2013 by Matthew Schuler, who at the time had gotten the fastest four-chair turn audition in The Voice history with the song.

== Charts ==
=== Weekly charts ===
Weekly chart performance for "Cough Syrup"
Chart (2011–12)	Peak position
Canada Hot 100 (Billboard)	82
Canada Rock (Billboard)	16
Italy (FIMI)	11
Netherlands (Dutch Tipparade 40)	2
Netherlands (Single Top 100)	95
US Billboard Hot 100	95
US Adult Alternative Airplay (Billboard)	18
US Alternative Airplay (Billboard)	3
US Hot Rock & Alternative Songs (Billboard)	9
US Adult Pop Airplay (Billboard)	28

=== Year-end charts ===
2011 year-end chart performance for "Cough Syrup"
Chart (2011)	Peak position
US Alternative Songs (Billboard)	30

2012 year-end chart performance for "Cough Syrup"
Chart (2012)	Peak position
Italy (FIMI)	72
US Alternative Songs (Billboard)	15
US Hot Rock Songs (Billboard)	29

== Certifications ==
Certifications for "Cough Syrup"
Region	Certification	Certified units/sales
Canada (Music Canada)	Gold	40,000^{*}
Italy (FIMI)	Platinum	30,000^{‡}
New Zealand (RMNZ)	Gold	15,000^{‡}
United States (RIAA)	2× Platinum	2,000,000^{‡}
^{*} Sales figures based on certification alone.^{‡} Sales+streaming figures based on certification alone.

== Release history ==
Release dates and formats for "Cough Syrup"
Region	Date	Format	Label(s)	Ref.
United States	November 8, 2011	Mainstream airplay	Roadrunner	
