= Mind over Matter (Young the Giant album) =

Studio album by Young the Giant
- Released: January 21, 2014
- Recorded: February 2012 – January 2014
- Genres: Indie rock, alternative rock
- Length: 52:55
- Label: Fueled by Ramen
- Producer: Justin Meldal-Johnsen

Young the Giant chronology
Young the Giant (2010)	Mind over Matter (2014)	Home of the Strange (2016)

Singles from Mind over Matter
- 1. "It's About Time" Released: October 28, 2013; 2. "Crystallized" Released: December 10, 2013; 3. "Mind over Matter" Released: May 6, 2014

Mind over Matter is the second studio album by the American alternative rock band Young the Giant. It was produced by Justin Meldal-Johnsen and released on January 21, 2014, by Fueled by Ramen. Promoted by the singles "It's About Time" and "Crystallized", the album received generally favorable reviews from music critics.

== Promotion ==
The lead single from the album, "It's About Time", was released on October 28, 2013, with an accompanying music video. On December 10, 2013, it was followed by the release of the second single, "Crystallized", for which a music video had been released a day earlier.

The album could be streamed for free on iTunes from January 14, 2014, until its official release on January 21, 2014.

== Critical reception ==
Professional ratings
Aggregate scores
Source	Rating
Metacritic	67/100
Review scores
Source	Rating
AbsolutePunk	7/10
AllMusic	3/5 stars
Consequence of Sound	C−
Contactmusic	2/5
The Gazette	4/5 stars
Rolling Stone	3/5 stars
Sputnikmusic	3.7/5

Mind over Matter received generally favorable reviews from music critics. At Metacritic, which assigns a normalized rating out of 100 to reviews from mainstream critics, the album received an average score of 67, based on 7 reviews, indicating "generally favorable" reviews.

Rating the album three stars out of five, Timothy Monger of AllMusic called the album "an able, straightforward modern indie rock record" and wrote that the band was at its best on some of the lighter songs on the album, such as "Firelight" and "Waves". However, he noted that "the type of mainstream guitar/synth rock Young the Giant pursue is littered with similar acts, making it tough to rise above the din. Comparisons to stadium-filling bands like Coldplay and Phoenix are not out of line, but there is a general lack of distinction to much of the music on Mind over Matter, suggesting that the band still hasn't discovered its defining characteristics."

Kristofer Lenzon for Consequence of Sound wrote that Mind over Matter "documents the metamorphosis of the band from indie darling who could to full-blown arena rock overlords". However, he noted that "all the gloss and shimmer doesn't add to the overall enjoyment of the album, but presents a wavering distraction from the content" and that at times Justin Meldal Johnson's heavy production seems to be trying to compete with the strength of lead singer Sameer Gadhia's vocals: "Virtuosic talents like Gadhia's often sound best when given room to breathe and expand, as on Young the Giant's 'God Made Man' or Mind Over Matter's 'Firelight', where a simple plucked guitar line and atmospheric tones serve as a platform, not competition for Gadhia. The result is the sweetest and most emotionally impactful song on the record. (...) On an album so choked with production, the simplest moment is its most affecting."

== Track listing ==
All tracks are written by Young the Giant, except "Eros" written by Young the Giant and Justin Meldal-Johnsen.

No.	Title	Length
1.	"Slow Dive"	0:47
2.	"Anagram"	4:54
3.	"It's About Time"	3:45
4.	"Crystallized"	4:00
5.	"Mind over Matter"	4:04
6.	"Daydreamer"	3:58
7.	"Firelight"	5:33
8.	"Camera"	5:12
9.	"In My Home"	3:39
10.	"Eros"	4:10
11.	"Teachers"	3:40
12.	"Waves"	4:38
13.	"Paralysis"	4:34
Total length:		52:55

== Personnel ==
Young the Giant

- Sameer Gadhia – lead and backing vocals, percussion, piano, organ, synthesizer, keyboards
- Jacob Tilley – guitar, Mellotron, synthesizer
- Eric Cannata – guitar, backing vocals
- Payam Doostzadeh – bass guitar, synthesizer
- François Comtois – drums, percussion, backing vocals

Additional musicians

- Justin Meldal-Johnsen – acoustic guitar, percussion
- Carlos de la Garza – percussion
- Jessica Ramseier – vocals
- Steven Aho – orchestration
- Roger Joseph Manning, Jr. – conducting, string arrangements

Technical personnel

- Justin Meldal-Johnsen – production, engineering, programming
- Carlos de la Garza – engineering
- David Schwerkolt – engineering
- Mike Schuppan – engineering, engineering assistant
- Dave Schwerkolt – engineering assistant
- Rich Costey – mixing
- Martin Cooke – mixing assistant
- Nicolas Fournier – mixing assistant
- Bo Hill – mixing assistant
- Ted Jensen – mastering
- Mark Obriski – art direction, design
- Matt Wisniewski – collage, cover collage
- David Vincent Wolf – photography

== Charts ==
Chart (2014)	Peak position
Canadian Albums (Billboard)	7
Dutch Albums (Album Top 100)	32
US Billboard 200	7
US Top Rock Albums (Billboard)	2

=== Singles ===
Title	Year	Peak chart positions	
Title	Year	US Alt	US Rock
"It's About Time"	2013	2	17
"Crystallized"	2013	35	27
"Mind over Matter"	2014	15	31
"—" denotes release that has not charted.
