= Victory Garden (album) =

Studio album by Young the Giant
- Released: May 1, 2026
- Length: 35:44
- Labels: Jungle Youth; Fearless; Concord
- Producers: Brendan O'Brien; Young the Giant

Young the Giant chronology
In the Open, Vol. 1 (2026)	Victory Garden (2026)

Victory Garden is the sixth studio album by the American alternative rock band Young the Giant. It was released on May 1, 2026, under their own label Jungle Youth Music under license to Fearless Records with distribution by Concord Records. The album was produced by Brendan O'Brien.

== Background ==
Victory Garden was announced by Young the Giant on February 6, 2026. In a press release, the band described the album as an ode to "radical empathy", further writing: "It's shaped by what we learn when we see a complicated world through the eyes of our young children. In uncertain times, radical empathy can become its own form of resistance."

In an interview with Audacy about the album and the band's history, frontman Sameer Gadhia said: "There's always more that we want to say, [...] and we don't feel anywhere close to having said all of it. So I think there's this inevitability of an inspiration for a record and music." Band member Eric Cannata explained in the same interview specifically about the band's vision for this album, saying that it was intended for them "to kind of come together and get back to our roots as like brothers" in addition to "[building] community within each other, and check in with all of us [regarding] where we're at [in life]".

== Promotion ==
The album was preceded by the release of three singles. The first single, "Different Kind of Love", was released in tandem with the album announcement on February 5, 2026. Of the song, Gadhia said in a statement that it is "an invitation to lead with empathy, to care deeply even when it's easier to shut down or turn away. At a time when cynicism feels like the default, this song believes that hope and unconditional love aren't naïve, but their own form of extreme resistance." The second single, "Bitter Fruit", was released in March 2026 alongside an accompanying music video for it. The band explained in a statement that the song chronicled "the struggle of being calloused by adulthood with a yearning to see the world fresh, through the eyes of a child." The third and final single, "Already There", was released on April 10, 2026; the band described the song in a statement as "about distance, longing, and the quiet ways we stay connected to the ones we love, no matter how far we roam."

== Track listing ==
All tracks are written by Young the Giant; "The Garden" written with Hannah Connolly.

Victory Garden track listing
No.	Title	Length
1.	"Evergreen"	3:41
2.	"Different Kind of Love"	3:39
3.	"Bitter Fruit"	3:17
4.	"Already There"	3:50
5.	"Ships Passing"	3:17
6.	"This Too Shall Pass"	3:40
7.	"Mona Lisa"	2:49
8.	"God as Witness"	3:28
9.	"Are You with Me?"	2:55
10.	"The Garden"	3:21
11.	"Life Is a Long Goodbye"	1:47
Total length:		35:44

== Personnel ==
Credits are adapted from Tidal.

=== Young the Giant ===
- Eric Cannata – production (all tracks), guitar (tracks 1–10), vocals (1, 2, 7–9), synthesizer (3–6, 9), charango (4), keyboards (5), percussion (10), piano (11)
- Francois Comtois – production (all tracks), drums (1–10), vocals (1, 2, 7–9), synthesizer (4, 8), piano (9), percussion (10)
- Payam Doostzadeh – production (all tracks), bass guitar (1–10), keyboards (1, 2), vocals (2), synthesizer (6, 8), piano (7, 10), percussion (10)
- Sameer Gadhia – vocals, production (all tracks); piano (3), percussion (10)
- Jacob Tilley – guitar, production (all tracks); synthesizer (1, 3–7, 9), vocals (2), piano (5), percussion (10)

=== Additional contributors ===
- Brendan O'Brien – production, mixing (all tracks); drum programming (2, 4), piano (4)
- Kyle Stevens – engineering, mixing
- Caroline Whitaker – engineering assistance
- Emily Lazar – mastering
- Ryan Nasci – additional engineering (1)
- Jon O'Brien – additional engineering (3–5, 8)
- Alexander Budman – baritone saxophone (7)

== Charts ==
Chart performance for Victory Garden
Chart (2026)	Peak position
Scottish Albums (Official Charts)	66
UK Albums Sales (OCC)	99
US Top Album Sales (Billboard)	47
