= Nice Shoes =

- Industry: Post-production
- Founded: 1996
- Headquarters: New York City, Toronto, Chicago, Minneapolis, Boston, USA, Canada
- Number of locations: 5
- Services: Design, animation, visual effects, color grading, virtual reality
- Website: https://www.niceshoes.com/

Nice Shoes is a post-production studio based in New York with locations in New York, Toronto, Boston, Chicago, and Minneapolis. Some of the studio's clients include Under Armour, IBM, Frontline, Estee Lauder, and Comedy Central. The studio also collaborated with Digitas to craft the Take It From A Fish campaign for Astrazeneca, the 2015 Grand Prix Lion winner in the Cannes Lions 'Pharma' category.

In 2020, Nice Shoes opened up an experimental division led by Ninaad Kulkarni, an animation filmmaker and mixed-media 3D artist, as the creative director.

== Work ==
Nice Shoes worked on end titles for Universal Studios' Pitch Perfect 2 and aided filmmakers Josh and Benny Safdie in developing a look for their film Heaven Knows What. The studio has also developed a proprietary remote collaboration technology, with partnerships in Atlanta, Austin, Boston, Dallas, Detroit, Los Angeles, and Miami.
