= It's About Time (Young the Giant song) =

Single by Young the Giant

from the album Mind over Matter
- Released: October 28, 2013
- Genre: Alternative rock
- Length: 3:48
- Label: Fueled by Ramen
- Songwriters: Sameer Gadhia, Jacob Tilley, Eric Cannata, Payam Doostzadeh, Francois Comtois
- Producer: Justin Meldal-Johnsen

Young the Giant singles chronology
"Apartment" (2012)	"It's About Time" (2013)	"Crystallized" (2013)

Music video
- "It's About Time" on YouTube

"It's About Time" is a song by American rock band Young the Giant from the band's second studio album, Mind over Matter. It was released as the lead single from the album on October 28, 2013. A music video accompanying the song was released the same day.

In an interview with Rolling Stone, Young the Giant drummer Francois Comtois said that the track is "certainly the most aggressive song on the album. But it kind of came from this realization we could do what we wanted to do and be honest about it."

== Charts ==
=== Weekly charts ===
Weekly chart performance for "It's About Time"
Chart (2013–2014)	Peak position
Canada Rock (Billboard)	5
US Hot Rock & Alternative Songs (Billboard)	17
US Rock & Alternative Airplay (Billboard)	5

=== Year-end charts ===
Year-end chart performance for "It's About Time"
Chart (2014)	Position
US Hot Rock & Alternative Songs (Billboard)	59
US Rock Airplay (Billboard)	21
