= Young the Giant =

American rock band

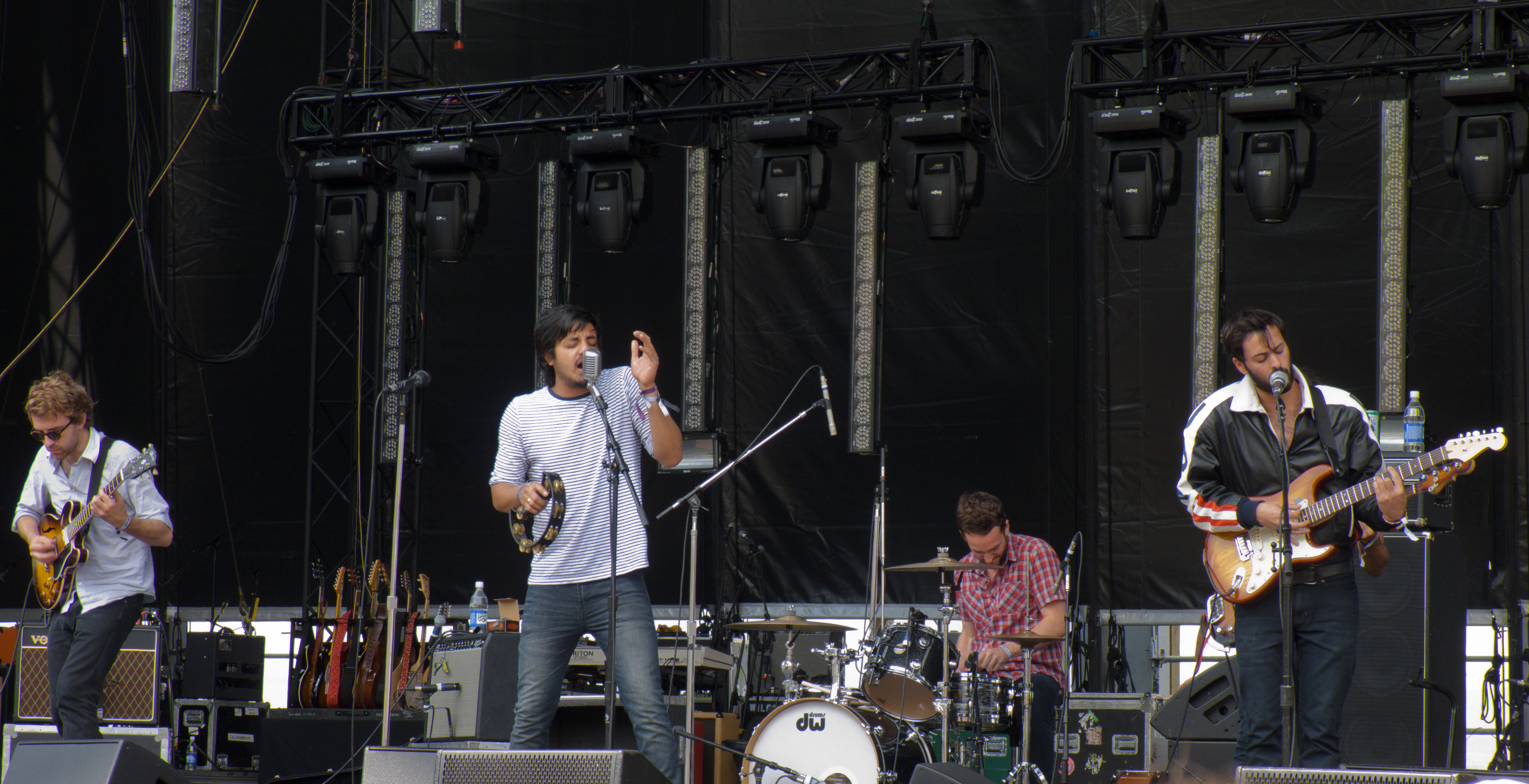
- Young the Giant performing at Sasquatch 2011

Background information
- Also known as: The Jakes (formerly)
- Origin: Irvine, California, U.S.
- Genres: Alternative rock; indie rock; indie pop
- Years active: 2004–present
- Labels: Elektra, Fueled by Ramen, Roadrunner, AWAL, Fearless
- Members: Sameer Gadhia; Jacob Tilley; Eric Cannata; Payam Doostzadeh; Francois Comtois
- Past members: Ehson Hashemian; Jason Burger; Sean Fischer
- Website: youngthegiant.com

Young the Giant is an American rock band that formed in Irvine, California, in 2004. The band's line-up consists of Sameer Gadhia (lead vocals), Jacob Tilley (guitar), Eric Cannata (guitar), Payam Doostzadeh (bass guitar), and Francois Comtois (drums). Formerly known as the Jakes, Young the Giant was signed by Roadrunner Records in 2009, and they released their eponymous debut album in 2010. The band's first three singles, "My Body", "Cough Syrup", and "Apartment", all charted on the US Alternative Songs chart.

== History ==
=== Formation (2004–2009) ===
The Jakes formed in 2004 in Irvine, California. Consisting of Jacob Tilley, Addam Farmer, Kevin Massoudi, Ehson Hashemian, and Sameer Gadhia, the band's name was an acronym of the members' first names. After several personnel changes, the group's lineup by 2008 included Gadhia, Tilley, Hashemian, Eric Cannata, Francois Comtois, and Jason Burger. Initial coordination of musical contributions was difficult because the members all attended different schools. With two members still in high school and the others each attending different colleges, the Jakes recorded an EP, Shake My Hand, with producer Ian Kirkpatrick. Band members then individually decided whether or not to put their schooling on hold to focus on music. Burger left the band to pursue an education at Manhattan School of Music in New York City, and Comtois took over as the drummer. Shortly thereafter, longtime friend and collaborator Payam Doostzadeh (Persian: پیام دوستزده) joined as bassist. In 2009, the band played four shows at the South by Southwest music festival in Austin, Texas. The band's song "Garands At Normandie" was played during an episode of MTV's The Real World: Brooklyn, and "Paid the Piper" was featured on A&E's The Beast. Another song, "Cough Syrup", received airplay on the Los Angeles radio station KROQ. Shortly before signing to Roadrunner Records in August, keyboardist Ehson Hashemian left the band. In December 2009, the band announced they had changed their name to Young the Giant.

=== Young the Giant (2010–2013) ===
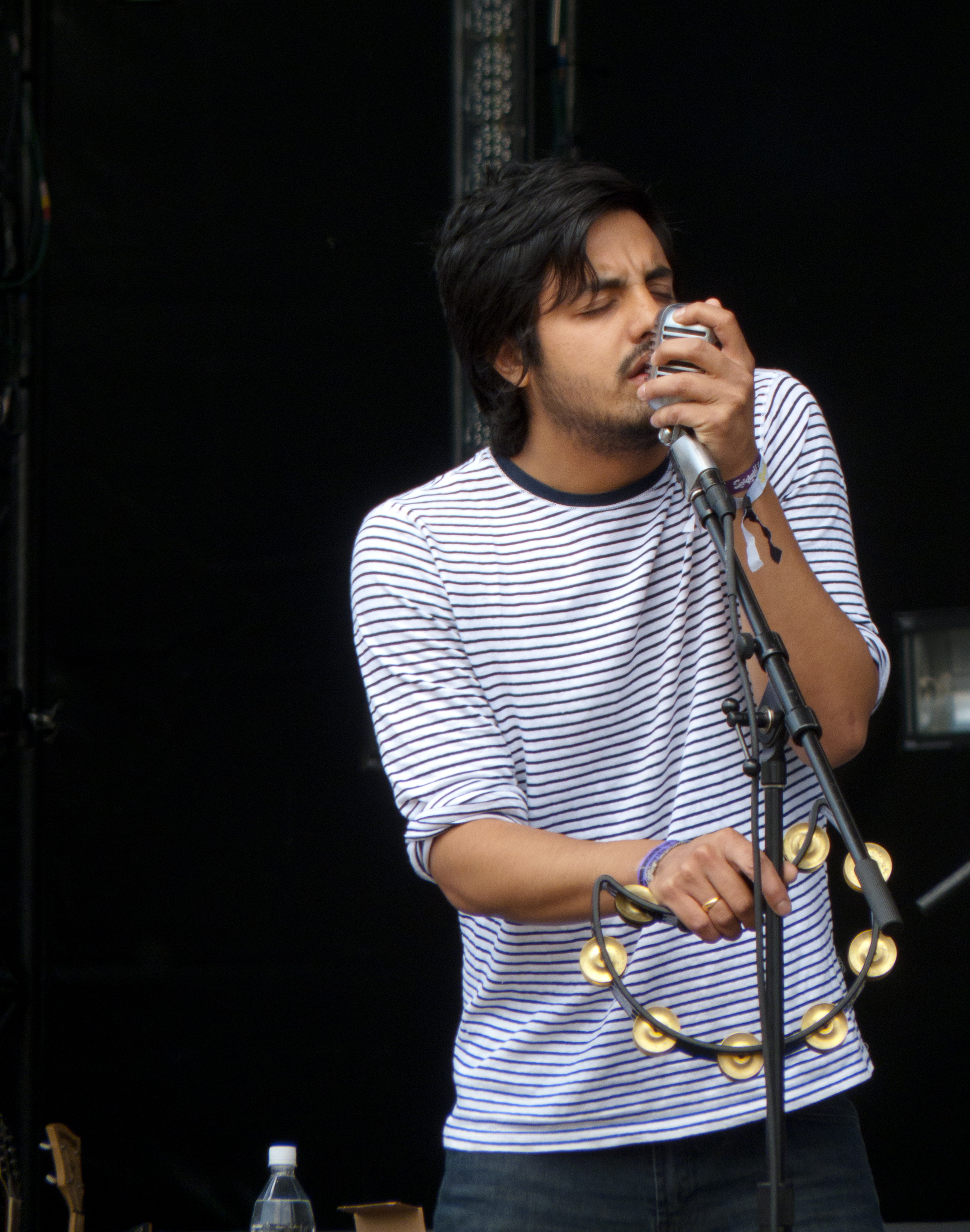
Sameer Gadhia performing at Sasquatch 2011

The Jakes officially changed their name to Young the Giant in January 2010 during the production of their eponymous album. The group chose to name themselves after the "stupid boldness" of their youth that motivated their commitment to music; Gadhia was the one to suggest having the definite article "the" in the middle of the name rather than at the beginning, believing it to be novel and unique.

Young the Giant spent 2010 opening for Minus the Bear and Steel Train while working on their debut album with Joe Chiccarelli at Sunset Sound Studios in Los Angeles. They took an old-school approach to recording the album. All the tracks were performed live which resulted in a lot of “chopping” during production. The band was very vigilant of their tracks but trusted the decisions of Joe Chiccarelli who had previously produced albums for The Shins, The Strokes, and Saints of Valory. The band believed in transparency; they only wanted to record what they could reproduce in front of an audience at a live show.

After the band finished recording in early June, they played additional shows with Marina and the Diamonds, The Futureheads, Neon Trees, and New Politics. Several songs—including "My Body", "I Got", and "Strings"—were leaked online in advance of the album's release. On October 26, Roadrunner Records digitally released the eponymous Young the Giant album, which Amazon.com hailed the third best rock album of 2010. The album was released physically in the U.S. on January 25, 2011 and in the UK on May 2.

The band's first single "My Body" was released to U.S. radio in January and went on to peak at number five on the Billboard Alternative Songs chart. iTunes offered the song as a weekly free download beginning January 9, and it was featured on an episode of American Idol. The band performed the song that month on ABC's Jimmy Kimmel Live! and Fuel TV's The Daily Habit. The official video for the single, which features actor Bryan James, was directed by Justin Francis.

In March, Young the Giant headlined the Billboard Showcase at South by Southwest in Austin, Texas. In May, the band played the Sasquatch! Music Festival, the BBC's Later... with Jools Holland, and The Great Escape Festival in Brighton. English singer Morrissey, on the fansite True to You, declared Young The Giant as one of his favorite new bands. The music video for the group's second single, "Cough Syrup", premiered in June. The band was named MTV's PUSH Artist of the Week on July 4.

An extended play (EP) featuring remixes by such artists as Two Door Cinema Club, Tokyo Police Club, and Ra Ra Riot was made available in September for free through Young the Giant's Facebook page. Fans were invited to create their own remixes with the opportunity for their entry to be featured on the EP. In August, the band played on the main stage at Lollapalooza.

Young the Giant performed during the 2011 MTV Video Music Awards on August 28. The band began a tour with Incubus two days later. The exposure from the VMA performance propelled Young the Giant onto the Billboard 200 albums chart, where it eventually peaked at number 42. Sales for "My Body" climbed 220 percent on iTunes, helping the single reach number 65 on the Billboard Hot 100 chart. Young the Giant played at the Austin City Limits Music Festival in September, and a month later they performed songs from their debut album for an episode of MTV Unplugged which debuted online in November.

"Apartment", the band's third single, was released in February 2011 and peaked at number 26 on the US Alternative Songs chart. The music video for the song premiered in April 2012. The group performed "Apartment" and "Cough Syrup" on a May episode of NBC's Today, and CNN Newsroom profiled the band a month later.

The band released a music video for non-album track "West Virginia" in January 2012 and started their first major headlining tour in February. They also headlined mtvU's first-ever Woodies Tour which began later that month. Darren Criss' character Blaine Anderson covered "Cough Syrup" on the season three episode of Glee titled "On My Way". The song featured during the attempted suicide scene with Max Adler's character Dave Karofsky.

In October 2020, the band announced the celebration of their ten-year anniversary of their self-titled album with a virtual concert, a special digital release, and a new vinyl release.

=== Mind over Matter (2013–2015) ===
On October 28, 2013, Young the Giant released "It's About Time", the lead single from the band's second album, Mind over Matter. On December 9, 2013, Young the Giant also released "Crystallized", another single from the band's second album. The album was released on January 21, 2014 via Fueled by Ramen. The band enlisted Grammy-nominated producer Justin Meldal-Johnsen to produce the album for the Southern California group.

The New York Times called the album "a sharp, electric album that has the cool reserve of the Cure matched with the arena mind-set of, say, Muse (though without that group’s mechanical air)."

The next fall the band embarked on a North American Tour starting in South Burlington, Vermont, and ending in Boulder, Colorado. The band was opened by the band Wildling who Gadhia helped in their search for a drummer. Following the release of their second album, the group released another set of videos for their In the Open series on YouTube.

In 2015, the band released two songs named "Mirrorball" and "Mind Over Matter (Reprise)" exclusively on vinyl for Record Store Day of that year. The songs were later released online July 28, 2017.

=== Home of the Strange (2016–2017) ===
On April 15, 2016, the band released a new track, "Amerika", taken from their third studio album, Home of the Strange, released on August 12, 2016. The first official single on the record is "Something to Believe In", which was sent to alternative radio on May 10, 2016. Another track from the album, "Titus Was Born", was released with an accompanying music video on June 17, 2016. Young the Giant's tour for the album began August 13, 2016, starting from the west coast of the United States. Two additional tracks from the album, "Jungle Youth" and "Silvertongue", were released in the weeks before the release of the album.

=== Mirror Master (2018) ===
The band released the first single, "Simplify", from their upcoming album on June 14, 2018. The album's second single, "Superposition", was released on August 23, 2018, along with an announcement that Mirror Master would be released on October 12, 2018, by Elektra Records. The band released the third single, "Heat of the Summer", on September 21, 2018. "Call Me Back", the fourth single and last before the album's release, was released on October 5, 2018.

=== American Bollywood (2022–2025) ===
The band announced the release of their fifth studio album titled American Bollywood on June 15, 2022, accompanied by the release of its first single, "Wake Up". It marks their first project as an independent artist, having created Jungle Youth Records and partnering with AWAL for distribution in an effort to retain ownership of their masters.

The album is structured around the Mahabharata, an ancient Indian mythology and religious text, and is divided into four acts with four songs each: "I: Origins", "II: Exile", "III: Battle", and "IV: Denouement". Though it stays true to the collective immigrant roots of the entire band, more focus is given to Gadhia's personal experience and connection to his culture, specifically telling the story of his parents' immigration from India to the United States. The band took inspiration from Bollywood media, psychedelic surf rock, and spaghetti western film scores to build the album's sonic landscape, blending eastern instruments (e.g. tabla, harmonium, and sitar) with western musical conventions.

"Act I: Origins", was released on July 15, 2022 alongside a music video for the album's title song, "American Bollywood". "Act II: Exile" was released on August 12 with music videos for "The Walk Home" and "My Way". "Act III: Battle" was released on October 7 with a music video for "Dollar Store". The full album with the last act, "IV: Denouement", was released on November 16, 2022 with an accompanying music video for "Otherside". The American Bollywood tour began on October 12, 2022 at the Red Rocks Amphitheatre in Morrison, Colorado.

=== Victory Garden (2026–present) ===
On February 5, 2026, the band announced their sixth studio album, Victory Garden, alongside the release of its first single, "Different Kind of Love", and an accompanying music video. A headline tour was also announced to begin later in the year. The album version of its second single "Bitter Fruit" was released on March 19, though an acoustic version was released the previous year as a part of In the Open, Volume 1, an EP of the band's popular "In the Open" acoustic arrangements of their discography.

The album is described as an ode to "radical empathy", which Cannata describes as coming from a yearning for community from both within the band and in society. In explaining the meaning behind its title, Gadhia references the victory gardens of the World Wars and their attempts to rally together the civilians of the Allied Powers during times of unrest and uncertainty, while also using the bandmembers' children as inspiration for a childlike perspective of the world. The band collaborated with producer Brendan O'Brien, who previously worked with artists such as AC/DC and Bruce Springsteen.

== Band members ==
Current members

- Sameer Gadhia – lead vocals, percussion, keyboards, rhythm guitar (2004–present)
- Jacob Tilley – lead guitar, keyboards, synthesizer (2004–present)
- Francois Comtois – drums, percussion, backing vocals (2007–present); bass guitar (2004–2007)
- Eric Cannata – rhythm guitar, backing vocals, keyboards, tenor ukulele (2007–present)
- Payam Doostzadeh – bass guitar, keyboards, synthesizer (2008–present)

Former members

- Ehson Hashemian – keyboards, piano, synthesizer (2004–2009)
- Jason Burger – drums, percussion (2007)
- Sean Fischer – drums, percussion (2004–2007)

== Discography ==
=== Studio albums ===
Title	Details	Peak chart positions										Certifications
Title	Details	US	AUS Hit.	BEL (WA)	CAN	IRL	ITA	NLD	NZ Heat.	SCO	UK	Certifications
Young the Giant	Released: October 26, 2010; Label: Roadrunner; Format: Digital download, CD, LP	42	—	—	—	84	52	29	—	84	83	RIAA: Gold
Mind over Matter	Released: January 21, 2014; Label: Fueled by Ramen	7	—	—	7	—	—	32	—	—	—	
Home of the Strange	Released: August 12, 2016; Label: Fueled by Ramen	12	7	176	17	—	—	91	2	—	—	
Mirror Master	Released: October 12, 2018; Label: Elektra	69	—	—	—	—	—	—	—	—	—	
American Bollywood	Released: November 16, 2022; Label: Jungle Youth Publishing, AWAL	— (Note: American Bollywood did not enter the Billboard 200 chart, but peaked at number 74 on the Top Album Sales chart.)	—	—	—	—	—	—	—	—	—	
Victory Garden	Released: May 1, 2026; Label: Fearless	— (Note: Victory Garden did not enter the Billboard 200 chart, but peaked at number 47 on the Top Album Sales chart.)	—	—	—	—	—	—	—	66	— (Note: Victory Garden did not enter the UK Albums Chart, but peaked at number 99 on the UK Album Sales Chart.)	
"—" denotes releases that did not chart.

=== Extended plays ===
Title	Details
Remix EP	Released: September 12, 2011; Format: Free digital download
iTunes Live from Soho	Released: October 18, 2011; Label: Roadrunner; Format: Digital download
ACT I: ORIGINS	Released: July 15, 2022; Label: Jungle Youth Publishing; Format: Digital download; Part 1 of four-part album American Bollywood
ACT II: EXILE	Released: August 12, 2022; Label: Jungle Youth Publishing; Format: Digital download; Part 2 of four-part album American Bollywood
ACT III: BATTLE	Released: October 7, 2022; Label: Jungle Youth Publishing; Format: Digital download; Part 3 of four-part album American Bollywood

=== Singles ===
Title	Year	Peak chart positions										Certifications	Album
Title	Year	US	US Adult	US Alt	US Rock	CAN	CAN Rock	IRL	ITA	MEX	NLD	Certifications	Album
"My Body"	2011	65	—	5	16	54	1	—	45	35	56	RIAA: Platinum; MC: Platinum	Young the Giant
"Cough Syrup"	2011	95	28	3	9	82	16	69	11	41	95	RIAA: 2× Platinum; BPI: Silver; FIMI: Platinum; MC: Gold	Young the Giant
"Apartment"	2012	—	—	26	—	—	—	—	—	—	—		Young the Giant
"It's About Time"	2013	— (Note: "It's About Time" did not enter the Billboard Hot 100, but peaked at number 99 on the US Airplay Top 100 chart.)	—	2	17	—	5	—	—	—	—		Mind over Matter
"Crystallized"	2013	—	—	35	27	—	—	—	—	—	—		Mind over Matter
"Mind over Matter"	2014	—	—	15	25	—	—	—	—	—	—	RIAA: Gold; BPI: Gold	Mind over Matter
"Mirrorball"	2015	—	—	—	—	—	—	—	—	—	—		Non-album single
"Amerika"	2016	—	—	— (Note: "Amerika" did not enter the Alternative Songs chart, but peaked at number 16 on the Alternative Digital Songs chart.)	28	—	—	—	—	—	—		Home of the Strange
"Something to Believe In"	2016	—	—	9	24	—	21	—	—	—	—		Home of the Strange
"Titus Was Born"	2016	—	—	—	—	—	—	—	—	—	—		Home of the Strange
"Silvertongue"	2016	—	—	21	48	—	—	—	—	—	—		Home of the Strange
"Simplify"	2018	—	—	21	46	—	—	—	—	—	—		Mirror Master
"Superposition"	2018	—	32	2	10	—	28	—	—	—	—	RIAA: Gold	Mirror Master
"Heat of the Summer"	2018	—	—	17	34	—	—	—	—	—	—		Mirror Master
"Call Me Back"	2018	—	—	—	—	—	—	—	—	—	—		Mirror Master
"Wake Up"	2022	—	—	31	—	—	—	—	—	—	—		American Bollywood
"The Walk Home"	2023	—	— (Note: "The Walk Home" did not enter the Adult Pop Airplay chart, but peaked at number 15 on the Adult Alternative Airplay chart.)	16	— (Note: "The Walk Home" did not enter the Hot Rock & Alternative Songs chart, but peaked at number 34 on the Rock & Alternative Airplay chart.)	—	—	—	—	—	—		American Bollywood
"Different Kind of Love"	2026	—	— (Note: "Different Kind of Love" did not enter the Adult Pop Airplay chart, but peaked at number 24 on the Adult Alternative Airplay chart.)	1	— (Note: "Different Kind of Love" did not enter the Hot Rock & Alternative Songs chart, but peaked at number 15 on the Rock & Alternative Airplay chart.)	—	7	—	—	—	—		Victory Garden
"Bitter Fruit"	2026	—	—	—	—	—	—	—	—	—	—		Victory Garden
"Already There"	2026	—	—	—	—	—	—	—	—	—	—		Victory Garden
"Evergreen"	2026	—	—	12	— (Note: "Evergreen" did not enter the Hot Rock & Alternative Songs chart, but peaked at number 37 on the Rock & Alternative Airplay chart.)	—	21	—	—	—	—		Victory Garden
"—" denotes release that has not charted.

=== Music videos ===
Year	Song	Director	Album	Ref
2011	"My Body"	Justin Francis	Young the Giant	
2011	"Cough Syrup"	Petro	Young the Giant	
2012	"Apartment	Marcus Haney	Young the Giant	
2013	"It's About Time"	David Vincent Wolf	Mind over Matter	
2013	"Crystallized"	Elliott Sellers	Mind over Matter	
2014	"Mind Over Matter"	Tim Nackashi	Mind over Matter	
2016	"Something to Believe In"	Computer Team	Home of the Strange	
2016	"Silvertongue"	Patrick Lawler	Home of the Strange	
2018	"Simplify"	Kyle Sauer	Mirror Master	
2018	"Superposition"	Computer Team	Mirror Master	
2019	"Heat of the Summer"	Kyle Sauer	Mirror Master	
2022	"American Bollywood"	Tanmay Chowdhary	American Bollywood	
2022	"The Walk Home"	Tanmay Chowdhary	American Bollywood	
2022	"My Way"	Tanmay Chowdhary	American Bollywood	
2022	"Tonight"	Tanmay Chowdhary	American Bollywood	
2022	"Dollar $tore"	Tanmay Chowdhary	American Bollywood	
2022	"Otherside"	Tanmay Chowdhary	American Bollywood	
2026	"Different Kind of Love"	George Gallardo Kattah	Victory Garden	
2026	"Bitter Fruit"	Ryan Pawlak	Victory Garden	
2026	"Already There"	George Gallardo Kattah	Victory Garden	
2026	"Evergreen"	George Gallardo Kattah	Victory Garden	
