= E.T. (song) =

2011 single by Katy Perry

- Kanye West remix cover

Single by Katy Perry featuring Kanye West

from the album Teenage Dream
- Released: February 11, 2011
- Studio: Conway Recording Studios (Hollywood)
- Genre: Electronic; hip-hop
- Length: 3:28 (album version); 3:51 (remix featuring Kanye West)
- Label: Capitol
- Songwriters: Katy Perry; Lukasz Gottwald; Max Martin; Joshua Coleman
- Producers: Dr. Luke; Ammo; Max Martin

Katy Perry singles chronology
| "Firework" (2010) | "E.T." (2011) | "Last Friday Night (T.G.I.F.)" (2011) |

Kanye West singles chronology
| "H.A.M." (2011) | "E.T." (2011) | "Marvin & Chardonnay" (2011) |

Music video
- "E.T." on YouTube

"E.T." is a song by American singer-songwriter Katy Perry from her third studio album, Teenage Dream (2010). She co-wrote the song with its producers Dr. Luke, Max Martin, and Ammo, and recorded the song at Conway Recording Studios, based in Hollywood, Los Angeles. A remix version of the song features verses from American rapper Kanye West, and the remix version was later included on the reissue of Teenage Dream, Teenage Dream: The Complete Confection (2012). Musically, it is an electronic and hip-hop ballad which draws heavily from dubstep and techno, along with smaller amounts of drum and bass. According to Perry, the song lyrically speaks of "falling in love with a foreigner".

After her solo version was released as a promotional single on August 17, 2010, the remix of "E.T." was serviced to radio stations as the album's fourth single on February 16, 2011. The song charted at number one in Canada, New Zealand, Poland, and the United States, while reaching the top 10 in Australia, Austria, France, Germany, Hungary, Ireland, Israel, Italy, Scotland, Slovakia, and the United Kingdom. It was the fourth-best selling song of 2011 in the US. It has also been certified Diamond in Brazil as well as the United States, and received multi-platinum certifications in Australia, Canada, and Finland.

To promote the song, Perry and West performed on the tenth season of American Idol, the 54th Annual Grammy Awards, and at Madison Square Garden for Z100's Jingle Ball. Floria Sigismondi directed the song's music video, which depicts Perry as an evolving alien drifting in outer space before landing on an abandoned litter-covered Earth, interspersed with clips of large felines hunting game. The video garnered positive reviews from music critics. The single won Favorite Song at the 38th People's Choice Awards, and received three nominations at the 2012 Billboard Music Awards.

== Background and release ==
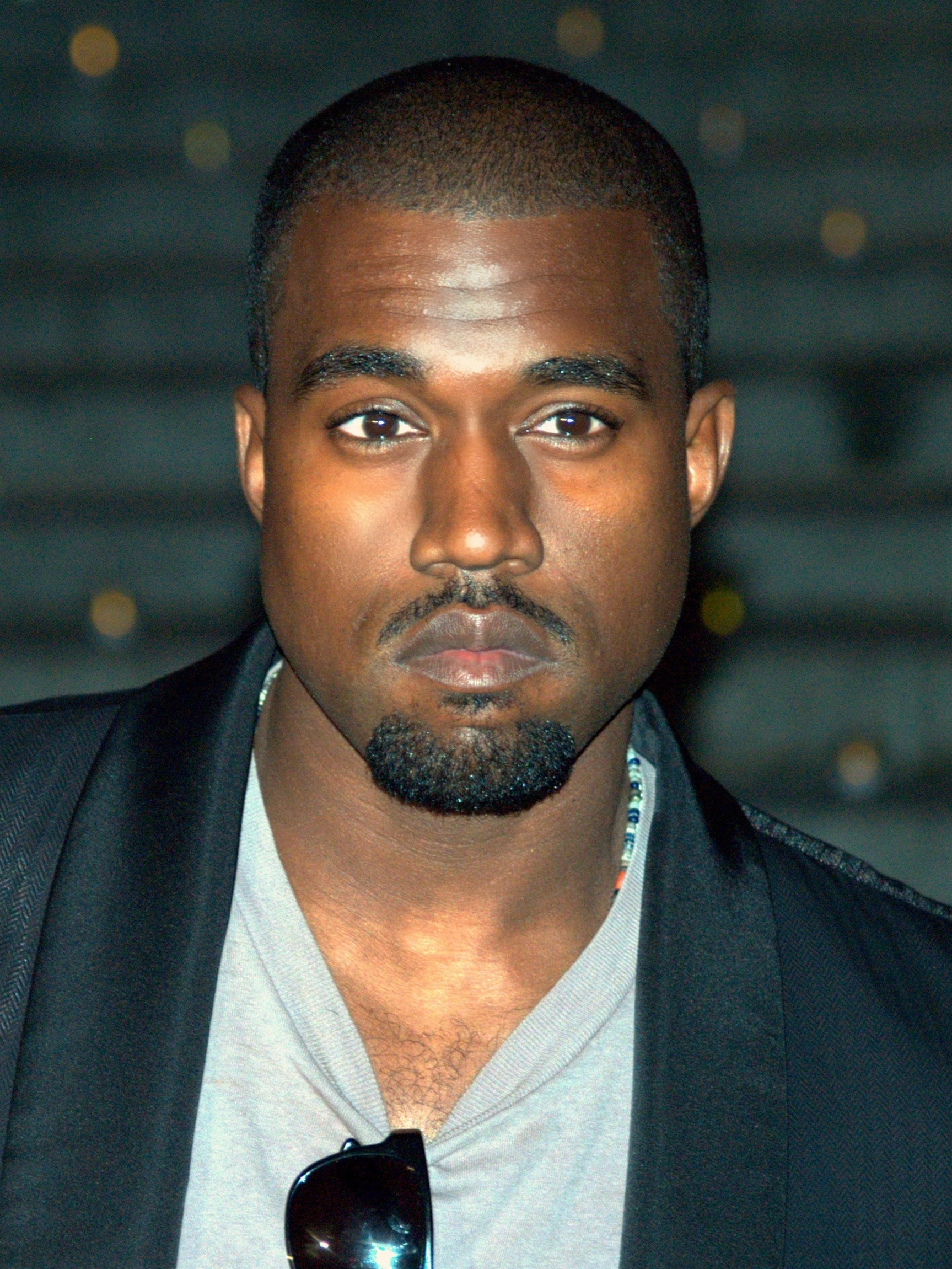
The official single version of "E.T." features rap verses by Kanye West.

Perry's decision to write "E.T." came after its beat was accidentally played during a recording session she had with Dr. Luke, Max Martin, and Ammo. It was originally intended for American hip hop group Three 6 Mafia. However, after hearing it, Perry chose to work with the track. She told MTV News: "I heard it and I always knew I wanted to write this futuristic, alienistic song, and they pulled it up and I was like, 'Wait, I can wrap my head around this. I know this seems like a long shot, but I think I have the perfect material to put on top of this sound.' And I did, and it really worked out perfectly."

The solo version of the song was released as a promotional single from Teenage Dream, first in the United States on August 17, 2010, and six days later in Australia. In December 2010, Perry asked fans through Twitter to help her select the album's fourth single. On December 13, 2010, she tweeted, "Thanks for all your great suggestions for the next single today!" and "Your voice has been heard! We're on the same page." One month later, Perry announced via Facebook that "E.T." would be the record's fourth single. The announcement was accompanied with the single's artwork, which features Perry with "cat eye make-up, bangs, and a sequined top". Unlike the original, the single version features rap verses from rapper Kanye West.

The remix debuted on February 11, 2011, in Canada, France, and the United Kingdom, before worldwide release five days later. In the United States, this version appeared for digital download on February 18. The remix was issued to contemporary hit radio format in the United States, and Italy on March 1, and March 4, respectively. Furthermore, this version debuted on other American radio formats, such as rhythmic contemporary on March 1, adult contemporary, hot adult contemporary, urban contemporary, and urban AC on April 12, whilst the original impacted pop, rhythmic, and hot AC radios. To further promote the single, an additional set of remixes of the song were made available on digital retailers in March 2011, followed by physical releases in the United Kingdom and Germany. The version with West was later included on Teenage Dream: The Complete Confection.

== Composition ==
"E.T."
A 21-second sample containing Perry's stuttered vocals over a "stomp-stomp-clap" beat.

Musically, "E.T." is an electronic and hip hop song, and draws heavily from dubstep and techno, along with smaller amounts of drum and bass. BBC Music described the song as a "rave-influenced quasi ballad". The song is written in the key of F minor and follows a slow tempo of 76 beats per minute in common time. Perry's vocal range spans from E♭_{4} to D♭_{5}. Ann Powers of the Los Angeles Times noted a "hip-hop diva's stutter" in the song similar to that of Rihanna. Matthew Perpetua of Rolling Stone found the song sounded similar to hard rock ballads by Evanescence. The song's production has been described as "a mishmash and bleeps and blips with a driving drum track". Darryl Sterdan of the QMI Agency noted the song uses the "stomp-stomp-clap" beat from Queen's song "We Will Rock You", while AllMusic's Stephen Thomas Erlewine noted similarities to productions helmed by Ryan Tedder.

According to Perry, the song is about "falling in love with a foreigner". James Montgomery of MTV News also noted that Perry sings about a "lover from different dimension". For its single release, the song was reworked to feature two verses from Kanye West, in which he raps about "extraterrestriality". "E.T." opens with the first rap verse by West containing the lines "I got a dirty mind / I got filthy ways / I'm trying to bathe my Ape in your milky way / They callin' me an alien / A big-headed astronaut". Then, using metaphors about extraterrestrials, Perry sings, "You're not like the others / Futuristic lover / Different DNA". The chorus has Perry addressing her lover: "Kiss me, kiss me / Infect me with your love and / Fill me with your poison", claiming to be "ready for abduction". West contributes a second verse to the track, before Perry's final refrain, with heavily auto-tuned vocals: "I know a bar out in Mars / Where they driving spaceships instead of cars". He finishes with a reference to the fictional animated character Shrek and lyrics about "alien sex": "I'mma disrobe you then I'mma probe you / See, I abducted you so I tell you what to do." Ben Kaplan from National Post noted West's presence on the track was similar to the work on his fourth studio album, 808s & Heartbreak (2008).

== Critical reception ==
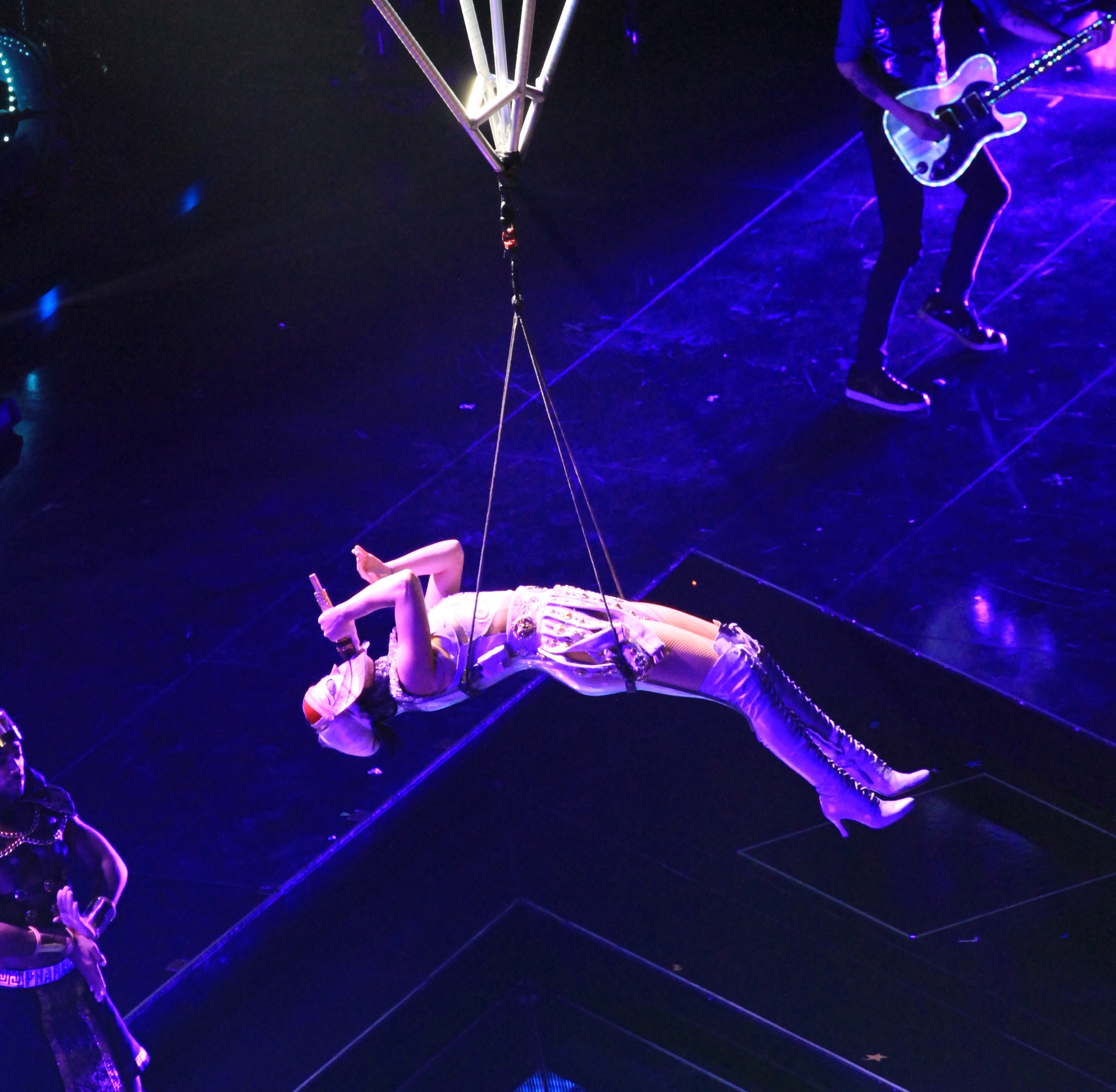
Perry performing the song during Prismatic World Tour

Leah Greenblatt of Entertainment Weekly felt that Perry shows strength on the song, comparing its sound to a combination of American rock musicians Lita Ford and Trent Reznor. Kerri Mason from Billboard felt that "E.T." together with some other tracks from the albums is heavier sonically and lyrically, with a boom-boom-pow electro punch and Perry discussing more toxic relationships." Even though Robert Copsey from Digital Spy stated that West's contribution on the track was "needless", he felt that the track "is a quirky and assured slice of state-of-the-art pop". Ben Kaplan from The National Post lauded the track as a "great duet", praising the vocals of both performers. Speaking for West's contribution on the track Brad Wete from Entertainment Weekly noted that the song was improved from a male perspective. Stephen Thomas Erlewine from AllMusic commented that Perry "replicates Ryan Tedder's glassy robotic alienation on 'E.T.', but tellingly avoids ripping off Lady Gaga".

Matthew Cole of Slant Magazine disliked the single's "inscrutability" and said that song's backing track was reminiscent of t.A.T.u.'s "All the Things She Said". Jason Richards from Now called the song "awkward" and Sputnikmusic's Rudy Clapper dismissed its attempt at a more mature sound, calling it "cheesy". PopMatters' staff writer Steve Leftridge called the song "neither strong nor edgy nor clever nor sonically interesting enough to lend any genuine credibility to Perry as a serious artist with anything to actually say". Amos Barshad of New York magazine felt West's alien metaphors went into jarring directions. Genevieve Koski of The A.V. Club gave the song a C−, saying that while its lyrical content was "borderline-embarrassing", it did earn "a couple bonus points for showing a relatively darker side" of Perry, while A.V. Club editor Steven Hyden was more critical of both Perry's and West's lyrics, saying that "borderline-embarrassing" was too generous and that "the whole concept of the song is so beyond either side of sanity" that it was impossible to grade.

== Commercial performance ==
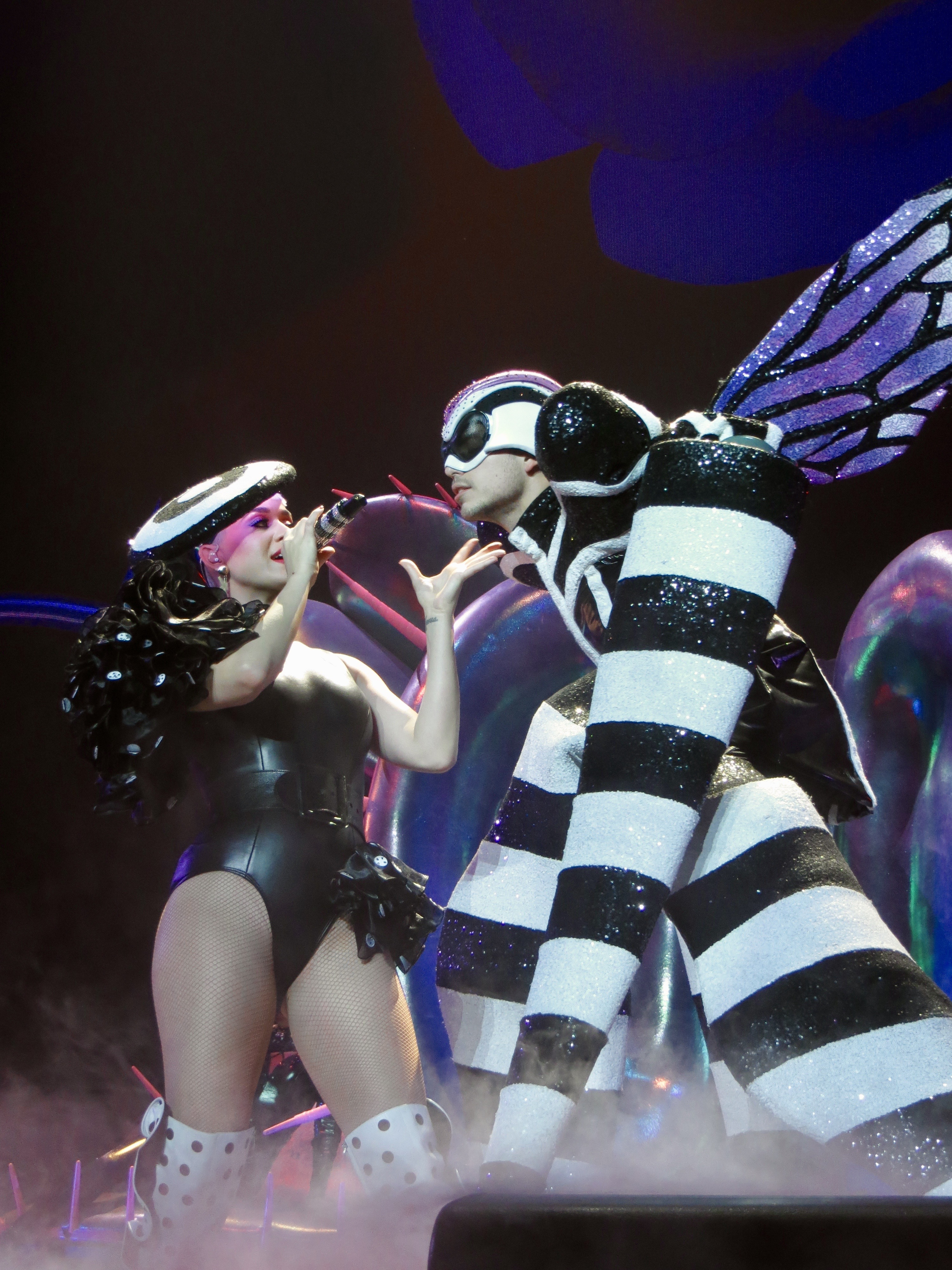
Perry singing "E.T." during her Witness: The Tour

One week before the official release of Teenage Dream, the solo version of "E.T." was released as a promotional single and debuted on the US Billboard Hot 100 chart at number 42, selling 64,000 digital copies. Following its single release featuring West, the song re-entered the Billboard Hot 100 on March 5, 2011, at number 28 with 110,000 copies being sold. In its fifth week, for the issue dated April 9, 2011, "E.T." topped the chart, giving Perry her fifth and West his fourth number-one single on the Hot 100. It ended the six-week run of Lady Gaga's "Born This Way" and made Teenage Dream the ninth album in history to yield four number-one singles. "E.T." spent five non-consecutive weeks at number one on the Hot 100 chart and was replaced one week by "S&M" by Rihanna featuring Britney Spears and later by Adele's "Rolling in the Deep." It was certified Diamond by the Recording Industry Association of America (RIAA) and sold 10 million copies only in the United States, becoming her fifth song reach this status. It topped the Billboard Hot Digital Songs chart for seven weeks, the longest since Eminem and Rihanna's "Love the Way You Lie" in 2010. "E.T." is one of the best-selling singles worldwide, and is the second-highest-selling single of Perry's career. "E.T." was the fourth-biggest Billboard hit of 2011, and third best-selling digital song of 2011 in the United States with sales of 4.83 million.

It debuted the same week on the Canadian Hot 100 at number 13. In Australia, the song debuted at number 12 and peaked at number five for two weeks in February 2011. Since then "E.T." has been certified double platinum by the Australian Recording Industry Association. One week after debuting at number 17, "E.T." topped the New Zealand Singles Chart on January 31, 2011, becoming her sixth number-one in the country, and has been certified platinum by the Recording Industry Association of New Zealand for sales of 15,000. As of July 20, 2011, it also became Perry's third single to be on New Zealand's Best Singles of All Time, just behind "Firework" and "California Gurls". On February 26, 2011, the solo version of the song entered the Billboard Hot Dance Club Songs chart at number 36, and later topped it, becoming her sixth number-one on the chart.

On the Billboard Mainstream Top 40 (Pop Songs), "E.T." set a record for most weekly plays in the 18-year history of the chart: for the tracking week of April 25 – May 1, 2011, Nielsen Broadcast Data Systems registered 12,330 plays over its 131 stations—an average of 94 plays per station. This figure rewrote Perry's previous record held with "California Gurls" in July 2010 (12,159). It went to set a new record the next week with 12,361 spins. That record was later broken yet again by Perry, when her single "Last Friday Night (T.G.I.F.)" registered 12,468 plays for the week dated August 13, 2011. Meanwhile, on the Rhythmic Airplay Chart, she achieved her first number-one hit, a rare feat for female pop artists considering she was the third to ever do so.

In other Billboard charts, "E.T." reached number two on the Adult Pop Songs chart, and the top 20 on the Adult Contemporary and Latin Pop Songs charts. Its highest sales week according to Nielsen SoundScan came in its fourth week at the summit of the Billboard Hot 100, where it sold 344,000 copies following its American Idol performance. The song sold over 300,000 digital copies in a week four times, becoming one of four songs in history to achieve this. The song sold three million digital copies by May 2011, becoming Perry's sixth song to achieve the feat, more than any other artist in digital history. The song sold four million in digital sales by July 2011, Perry's fifth song to reach this mark, no other artist had more than three 4 million-sellers. "E.T." was the highest selling track for the first half of 2011. The song is Perry's fourth and West's first song to reach the five million range which, for Perry is more than any other female artist in digital history. As of August 2020, the song has sold six million copies in the US.

The song re-entered the Canadian Hot 100 at number 18 following its single release and topped the chart in its twelfth week, on May 7, 2011. In the British Isles, the single peaked at number three in its eighth week on the UK Singles Chart, becoming her eighth top ten hit there while reaching number three in Scotland and number five in Ireland. It reached the top ten in Austria (7), Germany (9), Italy (9), France (10), and became a top twenty hit in the Walloon region of Belgium (14), Denmark (12), Finland (15), Norway (13), Sweden (12), and Switzerland (14). Elsewhere in Europe, the song charted in its solo version at number 18 on the Slovak airplay chart, 20 on the Czech airplay chart, 27 on the Dutch Top 40, and 28 on the Greek airplay chart. As of May 2022, "E.T." has sold 13 million copies worldwide.

== Music video ==
=== Background and production ===
MTV debuted the video on March 31, 2011. A backstage picture of West wearing street clothes along with Perry in a pastel-colored makeup and a giant braided headpiece was shown on MTV. On March 21, a teaser trailer was released; it was 12 seconds long and showed clips of an unidentified flying object. Prior to release, Perry aspired to make it "larger than life".

The music video was directed by Floria Sigismondi. It was produced by Natasha Alexsa Garcia, Danny Lockwood and Kelly Norris Sarno. The director of photography was Jonathan Sela. The video was edited by Jarrett Fijal. The online artist was Bill Pollock. VFX were produced at Dot & Effects by Jeff Dotson. Colorist was Beau Leon at New Hat. The style team included makeup artist Kabuki, hair stylist Pamela Neal and costume designer Carol Beadle, along with wardrobe stylist Johnny Wujek.

=== Synopsis ===
Perry kisses Shaun Ross's character to transform him from a robotic alien being

In the video, Perry, as an alien, drifts through outer space while slowly evolving into a humanoid appearance before landing on an abandoned Earth filled with trash. Clips are interspersed of large felines hunting game. She comes across a broken robot, resembling a spaceman; upon her kiss, it turns into a naked man, played by Shaun Ross. It is eventually revealed that Perry's legs resemble those of a gazelle. Meanwhile, West is featured in the video floating in a traveling spacecraft. The video also alludes to a presumable future, as Perry finds a box containing a skeleton of a pigeon (a species said to have gone extinct in 2030) and a pair of Vogue sunglasses, which she later wears. Throughout the video, Perry wears heavy cosmetics, including blue and pink make-up, catlike and reptile-like eyes, and braids resembling those of Medusa.

=== Reception ===
The video received positive reviews from critics. Willa Paskin of New York magazine praised Perry's looks in the video as "detailed, outlandish, [and] semi-gorgeous rainbow-kabuki". Kara Warner from MTV News also praised her appearance in the video, calling her an "angelic alien princess". She also felt the video was Perry's "most complex, stylized and out-there video production yet". Joseph Brannigan Lynch of Entertainment Weekly felt that West's rap verses helped the song top the Billboard Hot 100, and called the video an "awesomely bizarre sci-fi video, which impressively resists any obvious Spielberg references". Matthew Perpetua from Rolling Stone described the video as "a sequel to Avatar or a Katy Perry video game", and felt the song and video were "a bold move away from Perry's usual silliness and sexuality". Los Angeles Times described the video as a "sweeping visual manifestation". In a more negative review, Sal Cinquemani from Slant Magazine criticized Perry, saying she looked like an "animated video-game character" while saying West was a "non-presence". Cinquemani later went on to say: "It's a step up from bras that shoot whipped cream and fireworks, but this is ultimately Sigimondi's vision, and it's far from her finest five minutes." At the 2011 MTV Video Music Awards, the video for "E.T." won awards for Best Collaboration and Best Special Effects, while also receiving nominations for Best Art Direction, Best Direction and Best Editing. The video earned a nomination for Best International Artist Video at the 2011 MuchMusic Video Awards.

== Live performances and cover versions ==
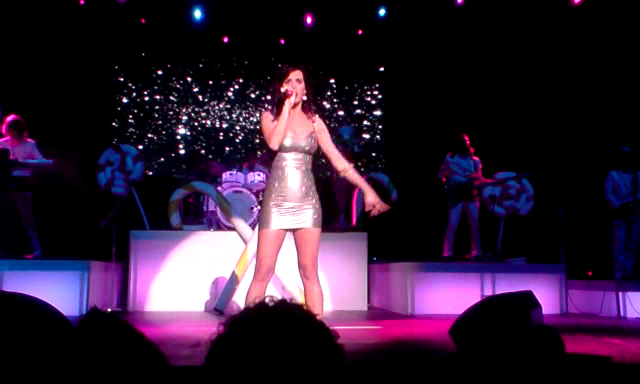
Perry performing "E.T." in Budapest, Hungary in October 2010

The song was included on the set list of the California Dreams Tour, Perry's second concert tour. Perry has also performed "E.T." at several venues, including a performance at Madison Square Garden in Manhattan on December 10, 2010, for Z100's Jingle Ball. The song was released as a free track on Katy Perry Revenge 2, a game for the iOS application Tap Tap. A lyrics video for the single was released on March 16, 2011. After playing "We Will Rock You", West performed "E.T." without Perry at the 2011 Coachella Valley Music and Arts Festival. Perry performed the single with West for the first time on the tenth season of American Idol on April 21, 2011. Carried by background dancers, she wore a flickering outfit and was joined by West, who was previously unannounced.

An acoustic version of "E.T." was performed by VersaEmerge in May 2011 at The Fueled By Ramen Studios. On June 27, 2011, the video of a stripped-down cover of the song by the American pop punk/alternative rock band Yellowcard was featured in Billboard's Mashup Mondays series.

In addition, the single was included on the setlists of Perry's Prismatic World Tour and Witness: The Tour, her third and fourth concert tours, respectively. The song was also used as the opening number in her Las Vegas concert residency, Play.

== Track listings and formats ==
- Digital download
1. "E.T." (featuring Kanye West) – 3:51
2. "E.T." (album version) – 3:26
- Digital download – remix EP
1. "E.T." (Tiësto remix – club edit) – 7:10
2. "E.T." (Benny Benassi radio edit) – 3:20
3. "E.T." (Dave Audé remix – radio edit) – 3:38
4. "E.T." (Noisia remix) – 3:53
5. "E.T." (Johnson Somerset and John Monkman remix) – 9:49
- German CD single
1. "E.T." (featuring Kanye West) – 3:49
2. "E.T." (Tiësto radio edit) – 4:03
- Digital download – German remix EP
1. "E.T." (featuring Kanye West) – 3:51
2. "E.T." (Tiësto remix – club) – 7:10
3. "E.T." (Benny Benassi radio edit) – 3:20
4. "E.T." (Dave Audé remix – radio edit) – 3:38
5. "E.T." (Noisia remix) – 3:53
6. "E.T." (Johnson Somerset and John Monkman remix) – 9:49

== Credits and personnel ==
Credits adapted from Teenage Dream album liner notes.

- Ammo – composer, drums, keyboards, programming, producer
- Megan Dennis – production coordination
- Serban Ghenea – mixing
- Jon Hanes – mix engineer
- Sam Holland – engineer
- Dr. Luke – composer, drums, keyboards, programming, producer
- Max Martin – composer, drums, keyboards, programming, producer
- Katy Perry – composer, lead vocals
- Kanye West – lead vocals
- Irene Richter – production coordination
- Vanessa Silberman – production coordination
- Emily Wright – engineer

== Charts ==
=== Weekly charts ===
Weekly chart performance for "E.T."
| Chart (2010–2011) | Peak position |
|---|---|
| Australia (ARIA) | 5 |
| Austria (Ö3 Austria Top 40) | 7 |
| Belgium (Ultratop 50 Flanders) | 24 |
| Belgium (Ultratop 50 Wallonia) | 14 |
| Brazil (Billboard Brasil Hot 100) Solo version | 24 |
| Brazil Hot Pop Songs Solo version | 5 |
| Canada (Canadian Hot 100) | 1 |
| CIS Airplay (TopHit) | 83 |
| Croatia International Airplay (HRT) | 3 |
| Czech Republic Airplay (ČNS IFPI) Solo version | 18 |
| Denmark (Tracklisten) | 12 |
| Euro Digital Song Sales (Billboard) | 4 |
| Finland (Suomen virallinen lista) | 15 |
| France (SNEP) | 10 |
| Germany (GfK) | 9 |
| Hungary (Rádiós Top 40) | 10 |
| Ireland (IRMA) | 5 |
| Israel International Airplay (Media Forest) | 5 |
| Italy (FIMI) | 9 |
| Japan Hot 100 (Billboard) Solo version | 71 |
| Luxembourg Digital Song Sales (Billboard) | 6 |
| Mexico Anglo (Monitor Latino) | 11 |
| Netherlands (Dutch Top 40) Solo version | 27 |
| New Zealand (Recorded Music NZ) Solo version | 1 |
| Norway (VG-lista) | 13 |
| Poland Airplay (ZPAV) Solo version | 1 |
| Portugal Digital Song Sales (Billboard) | 5 |
| Romania (Romanian Top 100) | 15 |
| Russia Airplay (TopHit) | 80 |
| Scottish Singles Sales (Official Charts) | 3 |
| Slovakia Airplay (ČNS IFPI) Solo version | 4 |
| Sweden (Sverigetopplistan) Solo version | 12 |
| Switzerland (Schweizer Hitparade) Solo version | 14 |
| Turkey (Number One Top 20) | 11 |
| Ukraine Airplay (TopHit) | 46 |
| UK Singles (Official Charts) | 3 |
| US Billboard Hot 100 | 1 |
| US Adult Contemporary (Billboard) Solo version | 18 |
| US Adult Pop Airplay (Billboard) Solo version | 2 |
| US Dance Club Songs (Billboard) Solo version | 1 |
| US Dance Airplay (Billboard) | 1 |
| US Dance Singles Sales (Billboard) | 1 |
| US Hot Singles Sales (Billboard) | 4 |
| US Hot R&B/Hip-Hop Songs (Billboard) | 83 |
| US Hot Latin Songs (Billboard) | 29 |
| US Mainstream Top 40 (Billboard) | 1 |
| US Rhythmic (Billboard) | 1 |

=== Monthly charts ===
Monthly chart performance for "E.T."
| Chart (2011) | Peak position |
|---|---|
| Russia Airplay (TopHit) | 96 |
| Ukraine Airplay (TopHit) | 67 |

=== Year-end charts ===
Year-end chart performance for "E.T."
| Chart (2011) | Position |
|---|---|
| Australia (ARIA) | 15 |
| Austria (Ö3 Austria Top 40) | 47 |
| Belgium (Ultratop 50 Flanders) | 96 |
| Belgium (Ultratop 50 Wallonia) | 58 |
| Brazil (Crowley) | 42 |
| Canada (Canadian Hot 100) | 10 |
| Croatia International Airplay (HRT) | 20 |
| Germany (Official German Charts) | 57 |
| Hungary (Rádiós Top 40) | 72 |
| Italy (Musica e dischi) | 45 |
| New Zealand (Recorded Music NZ) | 13 |
| Romania (Romanian Top 100) | 79 |
| Sweden (Sverigetopplistan) | 82 |
| Ukraine Airplay (TopHit) | 102 |
| UK Singles (OCC) | 35 |
| US Billboard Hot 100 | 4 |
| US Adult Top 40 (Billboard) | 21 |
| US Dance Club Songs (Billboard) | 1 |
| US Dance/Mix Show Airplay (Billboard) | 9 |
| US Mainstream Top 40 (Billboard) | 3 |
| US Rhythmic (Billboard) | 8 |

| Chart (2012) | Position |
|---|---|
| Russia Airplay (TopHit) | 171 |

=== Decade-end charts ===
Decade-end chart performance for "E.T."
| Chart (2010–2019) | Position |
|---|---|
| US Billboard Hot 100 | 40 |

=== All-time charts ===
All-time chart performance for "E.T."
| Chart (1958–2018) | Position |
|---|---|
| US Billboard Hot 100 | 166 |

== Certifications and sales ==
Certifications for "E.T."
| Region | Certification | Certified units/sales |
|---|---|---|
| Australia (ARIA) | 6× Platinum | 420,000^{‡} |
| Austria (IFPI Austria) | Platinum | 30,000^{*} |
| Brazil (Pro-Música Brasil) | Diamond | 250,000^{‡} |
| Canada (Music Canada) | 7× Platinum | 560,000^{‡} |
| Denmark (IFPI Danmark) | Gold | 15,000^{^} |
| Finland | 2× Platinum | 8,000 |
| France (SNEP) | Platinum | 200,000^{‡} |
| Germany (BVMI) | Gold | 150,000^{^} |
| Italy (FIMI) | Platinum | 30,000^{*} |
| Mexico (AMPROFON) | Gold | 30,000^{*} |
| New Zealand (RMNZ) | 3× Platinum | 90,000^{‡} |
| South Korea | — | 162,540 (Note: South Korea sales figures as of December 2011.) |
| United Kingdom (BPI) | 2× Platinum | 1,200,000^{‡} |
| United States (RIAA) | Diamond | 10,000,000^{‡} |
Streaming
| Greece (IFPI Greece) | Gold | 1,000,000^{†} |
Summaries
| Worldwide | — | 13,000,000 (Note: Worldwide sales figures as of May 2022.) |
^{*} Sales figures based on certification alone.^{^} Shipments figures based on certification alone.^{‡} Sales+streaming figures based on certification alone.

== Release history ==
List of release dates and formats for "E.T."
| Region | Date | Format(s) | Version(s) | Label | Ref. |
|---|---|---|---|---|---|
| United States | August 17, 2010 (Note: Release as a promotional single.) | Digital download | Original | Capitol | |
| Australia | August 23, 2010 | Digital download | Original | Capitol | |
| Canada | February 11, 2011 | Digital download | Remix featuring Kanye West | Capitol | |
| France | February 11, 2011 | Digital download | Remix featuring Kanye West | Capitol | |
| United Kingdom | February 11, 2011 | Digital download | Remix featuring Kanye West | Capitol | |
| Various | February 16, 2011 | Digital download | Remix featuring Kanye West | Capitol | |
| United States | February 18, 2011 | Digital download | Remix featuring Kanye West | Capitol | |
| United States | March 1, 2011 | Contemporary hit radio; rhythmic radio | Original; remix featuring Kanye West | Capitol | |
| Australia | March 4, 2011 | Digital download | Remixes | Capitol | |
| Belgium | March 4, 2011 | Digital download | Remixes | Capitol | |
| Canada | March 4, 2011 | Digital download | Remixes | Capitol | |
| France | March 4, 2011 | Digital download | Remixes | Capitol | |
| Italy | March 4, 2011 | Radio airplay | Remix featuring Kanye West | Polydor | |
| New Zeleand | March 4, 2011 | Digital download | Remixes | Capitol | |
| United States | March 4, 2011 | Digital download | Remixes | Capitol | |
| United Kingdom | March 11, 2011 | Digital download | Remixes | Capitol | |
| United Kingdom | March 17, 2011 | CD; maxi CD | 2-track | EMI | |
| Germany | March 18, 2011 | CD; digital download | Remixes | Capitol | |
| Switzerland | March 18, 2011 | Digital download | Remixes | Capitol | |
| United States | April 11, 2011 | AC radio; hot AC radio; modern AC radio | Original | Capitol | |
| United States | April 12, 2011 | AC radio; hot AC radio; urban AC radio; urban radio | Remix featuring Kanye West | Capitol | |

== See also ==
- List of Canadian Hot 100 number-one singles of 2011
- List of number-one singles from the 2010s (New Zealand)
- List of number-one singles of 2011 (Poland)
- List of Billboard Hot 100 number ones of 2011
- List of number-one digital songs of 2011 (U.S.)
- List of Billboard Dance Club Songs number ones of 2011
- List of number-one dance airplay hits of 2011 (U.S.)
- List of Billboard Mainstream Top 40 number-one songs of 2011
- List of Radio Songs number ones of the 2010s
- List of Billboard Rhythmic number-one songs of the 2010s
