= My Body (Young the Giant song) =

Single by Young the Giant

from the album Young the Giant
- Released: July 2010 (digital download); January 10, 2011 (US radio)
- Recorded: 2010
- Genre: Indie rock; alternative rock
- Length: 4:05
- Label: Roadrunner
- Songwriters: Sameer Gadhia; Jacob Tilley; Eric Cannata; Payam Doostzadeh; Francois Comtois
- Producers: Joe Chiccarelli; Young the Giant

Young the Giant singles chronology
"My Body" (2010)	"Cough Syrup" (2011)

Music video
- "My Body" on YouTube

"My Body" is a 2010 song by American alternative rock band Young the Giant from their eponymous debut album. Written by the band and released as a single in 2011, it peaked at number five on the Billboard Alternative Songs chart and number 65 on the US Billboard Hot 100. Young the Giant performed "My Body" at the 2011 MTV Video Music Awards and the song was featured in NHL 15.

== Background and composition ==
According to singer Sameer Gadhia, "My Body" was conceived at the end of a frustrating day for the band. "Why don't we just jam something out, like the most ridiculous thing you could imagine?" Gadhia recalled the discussion. "It doesn't even have to make sense. Just yell it out, because it means you're releasing your tension." Ten minutes later, he said, "the entire song had been created." Guitarist Eric Cannata, in a separate interview, echoed Gadhia's remarks that the song "started just as a quirky joke" to help relieve stress. Cannata added, "The dynamic between tension and liberation came from the very basic literal interpretation of the struggle we experienced directly before the creation of the song. It was a stroke of inspiration, and later appreciated insight, that cut through a relatively frustrating time for us as writers."

Gadhia told Spinner.com that the song "really embodies Young the Giant: a combination of youthful energy and slightly naïve but optimistic determination. It captures a sense of passion, urgency and excitement that we've felt throughout the writing and recording process."

== Release and critical reception ==
"My Body" was released onto the internet in July 2010 in advance of the band's debut album, which was released digitally in October. The song entered the US Alternative Songs chart in January and peaked at number 5 in April. Five months later, the song reached number 65 on the Billboard Hot 100 singles chart. The song also peaked at number 54 in Canada and number 56 in the Netherlands.

Billboard's Ryan Reed complimented Gadhia's vocals and wrote that the song "is representative of the group's charms, offering an infectious mix of stainless steel electric guitars, beefy drums and mammoth hooks." In a review of the album, Caitlin Meyer of Consequence said, "with a danceable, building beat and an explosive anthem of a chorus, it's truly difficult not to put this song on repeat, sing along, and forgo listening to the rest of the album." Chris Conaton of PopMatters compared the song's drumbeat to that of Marilyn Manson's "The Beautiful People", and said "My Body" is "one of the better tracks on the album". Drowned in Sound's Alex Yau said the sound of the song's guitars is reminiscent of that on the Kings of Leon album Come Around Sundown. Pitchfork's Ian Cohen described the song as "rank Cold War Kids karaoke". The song has been covered by the Danish heavy metal band Volbeat on their album Outlaw Gentlemen & Shady Ladies.

== In popular culture ==
The song featured in the fifth episode of the final season of the Netflix series 13 Reasons Why.

The song is featured in the sixth episode of the third season of The Vampire Diaries.

The song is featured on the series “Outer Banks”

== Live performances ==
Young the Giant performed "My Body" on ABC's Jimmy Kimmel Live! and Fuel TV's The Daily Habit in January 2011, and then the BBC's Later... with Jools Holland in May. In August, they performed "My Body" at the 2011 MTV Video Music Awards. The band invited 300 fans from their hometown of Irvine, California onstage for the performance. The appearance resulted in a 220 percent increase in digital downloads for the song during the following week.

== Charts and certifications ==
=== Weekly charts ===
Chart (2011)	Peak position
Canada (Canadian Hot 100)	54
Canada Rock (Billboard)	1
Italy (FIMI)	45
Netherlands (Mega Single Top 100)	56
US Billboard Hot 100	65
US Alternative Songs (Billboard)	5
US Rock Songs (Billboard)	16

=== Year-end charts ===
Chart (2011)	Position
US Alternative Songs (Billboard)	14
US Hot Rock Songs (Billboard)	44

=== Certifications ===
Region	Certification	Certified units/sales
Canada (Music Canada)	Platinum	80,000^{*}
United States (RIAA)	Platinum	1,000,000^{‡}
^{*} Sales figures based on certification alone.^{‡} Sales+streaming figures based on certification alone.
