= Crystallized (song) =

Single by Young the Giant

from the album Mind over Matter
- Released: December 10, 2013
- Genre: Indie rock, alternative rock
- Length: 4:00
- Label: Fueled by Ramen
- Songwriters: Sameer Gadhia, Jacob Tilley, Eric Cannata, Payam Doostzadeh, Francois Comtois
- Producer: Justin Meldal-Johnsen

Young the Giant singles chronology
"It's About Time" (2013)	"Crystallized" (2013)	"Mind over Matter" (2014)

Music video
- "Crystallized" on YouTube

"Crystallized" is a song by American alternative rock band Young the Giant. On December 10, 2013, it was released as the second single from the band's second studio album, Mind over Matter. The song debuted at number 27 on the Billboard Hot Rock Songs chart.

A music video for the song, directed by Elliott Sellers, was released onto YouTube on December 8, 2013.

== Charts ==
Chart (2013–2014)	Peak position
US Hot Rock & Alternative Songs (Billboard)	27
US Alternative Airplay (Billboard)	35
