= List of awards and nominations received by Guns N' Roses =

Guns N' Roses awards and nominations
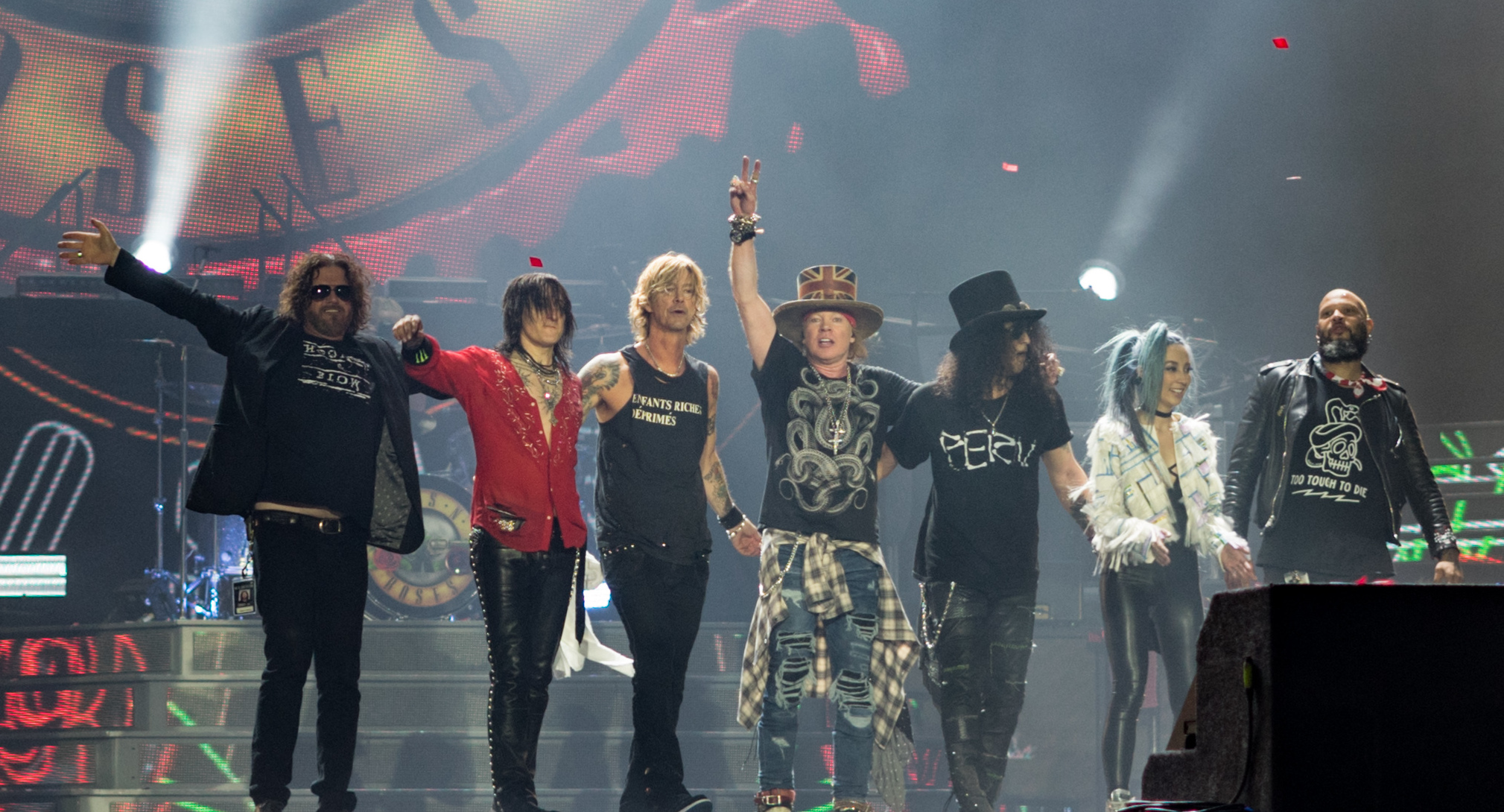
- Guns N' Roses performing in 2017
Awards and nominations
Award	Wins	Nominations
American Music Awards	4	8
Billboard	2	6
Brit	0	4
Echo	0	1
Grammy	0	4
Juno	0	1
MTV VMA	4	8
World Music	2	2

Totals (Note: Certain award groups do not simply award one winner. They acknowledge several different recipients, have runners-up, and have third place. Since this is a specific recognition and is different from losing an award, runner-up mentions are considered wins in this award tally. For simplification and to avoid errors, each award in this list has been presumed to have had a prior nomination.)
- Wins: 19
- Nominations: 52

Guns N' Roses is an American hard rock band formed 1985 in Los Angeles, California. They are led by frontman and co-founder Axl Rose, and also include Slash (lead guitar), Dizzy Reed (keyboards), Duff McKagan (bass), Melissa Reese (keyboards), Richard Fortus (guitar), and Frank Ferrer (drums). Guns N' Roses have released six studio albums, all on the Geffen Records label: Appetite for Destruction (1987), G N' R Lies (1988), Use Your Illusion I (1991), Use Your Illusion II (1991), "The Spaghetti Incident?" (1993), and Chinese Democracy (2008). Guns N' Roses have sold more than 45 million albums in the United States.

The band has won four American Music Awards, including Favorite Pop/Rock Single for "Sweet Child o' Mine" in 1989, both Favorite Heavy Metal/Hard Rock Artist and Favorite Heavy Metal/Hard Rock Album for Appetite for Destruction in 1990, and Favorite Heavy Metal/Hard Rock Artist for the second time in 1992. Guns N' Roses have received four competitive Grammy Awards nominations but have yet to win; their album Appetite for Destruction was inducted into the Grammy Hall of Fame in 2024. Overall, Guns N' Roses have received 19 awards from 52 nominations (including special honors and inductions).

== American Music Awards ==
The American Music Awards is an annual awards ceremony created by Dick Clark in 1973. Guns N' Roses have received four awards from eight nominations.

Year	Nominee / work	Award	Result
1989	"Sweet Child o' Mine"	Favorite Pop/Rock Single	Won
1989	Guns N' Roses	Favorite Heavy Metal/Hard Rock Artist	Nominated
1989	Appetite for Destruction	Favorite Heavy Metal/Hard Rock Album	Nominated
1990	Guns N' Roses	Favorite Heavy Metal/Hard Rock Artist	Won
1990	Appetite for Destruction	Favorite Heavy Metal/Hard Rock Album	Won
1992	Guns N' Roses	Favorite Heavy Metal/Hard Rock Artist	Won
1992	Guns N' Roses	Favorite Pop/Rock Band/Duo/Group	Nominated
1992	Use Your Illusion I	Favorite Heavy Metal/Hard Rock Album	Nominated

== BRIT Awards ==
The BRIT Awards are the British Phonographic Industry's annual pop music awards. Guns N' Roses have received four nominations.

Year	Nominee / work	Award	Result
1990	Guns N' Roses	Best International Newcomer	Nominated
1990	Guns N' Roses	Best International Group	Nominated
1990	"Paradise City"	Best Music Video	Nominated
1992	Guns N' Roses	Best International Group	Nominated

== Billboard Music Awards ==
The Billboard Music Award is an honor given by Billboard, a publication and music popularity chart covering the music business. The Billboard Music Awards show had been held annually since 1990.

Year	Nominee / work	Award	Result
1988	Guns N' Roses	Top Pop New Artist	Nominated
2017	Guns N' Roses	Top Duo/Group	Nominated
2017	Guns N' Roses	Top Touring Artist	Nominated
2017	Not in This Lifetime... Tour	Top Rock Tour	Nominated
2018	Guns N' Roses	Top Touring Artist	Nominated
2018	Guns N' Roses	Top Rock Tour	Nominated

== Billboard Touring Awards ==
The Billboard Touring Conference and Awards is an annual meeting sponsored by Billboard magazine which also honors the top international live entertainment industry artists and professionals. Established in 2004, it has been described as "part industry conference, part awards show".

Year	Nominee / work	Award	Result
2017	Not in This Lifetime... Tour	Top Boxscore	Won
2017	Not in This Lifetime... Tour	Top Tour/Top Draw	Won

== Echo Awards ==
The ECHO Awards are an accolade by the Deutsche Phono-Akademie, an association of recording companies of Germany, to recognize outstanding achievement in the music industry. The awards have been held since 1992.

Year	Nominee / work	Award	Result
1993	Guns N' Roses	International Group of the Year	Nominated

== GAFFA Awards ==
=== Denmark GAFFA Awards ===
Delivered since 1991, the GAFFA Awards are a Danish award that rewards popular music by the magazine of the same name. Guns N' Roses have received six nominations.

Year	Nominee / work	Award	Result
1991	Guns N' Roses	Concert of the Year	Nominated
1991	Use Your Illusion	Album of the Year	Nominated
1991	"Don't Cry"	Song of the Year	Nominated
1991	"Don't Cry"	Music Video of the Year	Nominated
1993	Guns N' Roses	Most Overrated	Nominated
1993	Guns N' Roses	Concert of the Year	Nominated

== Grammy Awards ==
The Grammy Awards are awarded annually by the National Academy of Recording Arts and Sciences of the United States. Guns N' Roses have received four competitive nominations and one Grammy Hall of Fame induction.

Year	Nominee / work	Award	Result
1989	G N' R Lies	Best Hard Rock Performance	Nominated
1991	Use Your Illusion I	Best Hard Rock Performance	Nominated
1992	"Live and Let Die"	Best Hard Rock Performance	Nominated
2018	Appetite for Destruction: Locked N’ Loaded edition	Best Boxed or Special Limited Edition Package	Nominated

=== Grammy Hall of Fame ===
The Grammy Hall of Fame is a special Grammy award established in 1973 to honor recordings of lasting qualitative or historical significance that are at least 25 years old.

Year	Nominee / work	Award	Result
2024	Appetite for Destruction	Grammy Hall of Fame	Won

== Juno Awards ==
The JUNO Awards are presented annually to Canadian musical artists and bands to acknowledge their artistic and technical achievements in all aspects of music. Non-Canadian artists are eligible for several awards, including the International Album of the Year.

Year	Nominee / work	Award	Result
2009	Chinese Democracy	Juno Award for International Album of the Year	Nominated

== MTV Video Music Awards ==
The MTV Video Music Awards is an annual awards ceremony established in 1984 by MTV. Guns N' Roses have received four awards from eight nominations.

Year	Nominee / work	Award	Result
1988	"Welcome to the Jungle"	Best New Artist in a Video	Won
1989	"Sweet Child O' Mine"	Best Heavy Metal Video	Won
1989	"Sweet Child O' Mine"	Best Group Video	Nominated
1989	"Paradise City"	Best Stage Performance in a Video	Nominated
1991	"You Could Be Mine"	Best Heavy Metal/Hard Rock Video	Nominated
1991	"You Could Be Mine"	Best Video from a Film	Nominated
1992	Guns N' Roses	Video Vanguard Award	Won
1992	"November Rain"	Best Cinematography in a Video	Won
1992	"November Rain"	Best Art Direction in a Video	Nominated

== Rock and Roll Hall of Fame ==
The Rock and Roll Hall of Fame is a museum located on the shores of Lake Erie in downtown Cleveland, Ohio, United States, dedicated to the recording history of some of the best-known and most influential artists, producers, and other people who have influenced the music industry.

Year	Nominee / work	Award	Result
2012	Group	Performers	Won

== World Music Awards ==
The World Music Awards honors recording artists based on worldwide sales figures provided by the International Federation of the Phonographic Industry. Guns N' Roses received two awards in 1993.

Year	Nominee / work	Award	Result
1993	Guns N' Roses	World's Best-Selling Hard Rock Artist of the Year	Won
1993	Guns N' Roses	World's Best Group	Won

== ZD Awards ==
Zvukovaya Dorozhka (Russian: Звуковая Дорожка, "sound track") is Russia's oldest hit parade in the field of popular music. Since 2003, it has been presented in a ceremony in concert halls. It is considered one of the major Russian music awards.

Year	Nominee / work	Award	Result
2018	Not in This Lifetime... Tour (live at Otkrytie Arena)	Tour of the Year	Nominated

== Other awards and honors ==
Year	Nominee / work	Award	Result
1988	Guns N' Roses	L.A. Weekly Rock Music Awards – Best Hard Rock Band	Won
1992	Guns N' Roses	Los Angeles Music Awards – Group of the Year	Nominated
2008	"If The World" from Body of Lies	13th Satellite Awards – Best Original Song	Nominated
2012	Guns N' Roses	Ultimate Classic Rock Awards – Tour of the Year (for 2011)	Won
2014	Axl Rose	Revolver Golden Gods – Ronnie James Dio Lifetime Achievement Award	Won
2015	Appetite for Democracy 3D	International 3D & Advanced Imaging Society Awards – Best 3D Music Entertainment Feature	Won
2019	Not in This Lifetime... Tour	Ticketmaster Touring Milestone Award	Won
