= List of awards and nominations received by Van Halen =

List of awards and award nominations received by Van Halen

This is a list of awards and nominations for awards received by the hard rock band Van Halen.

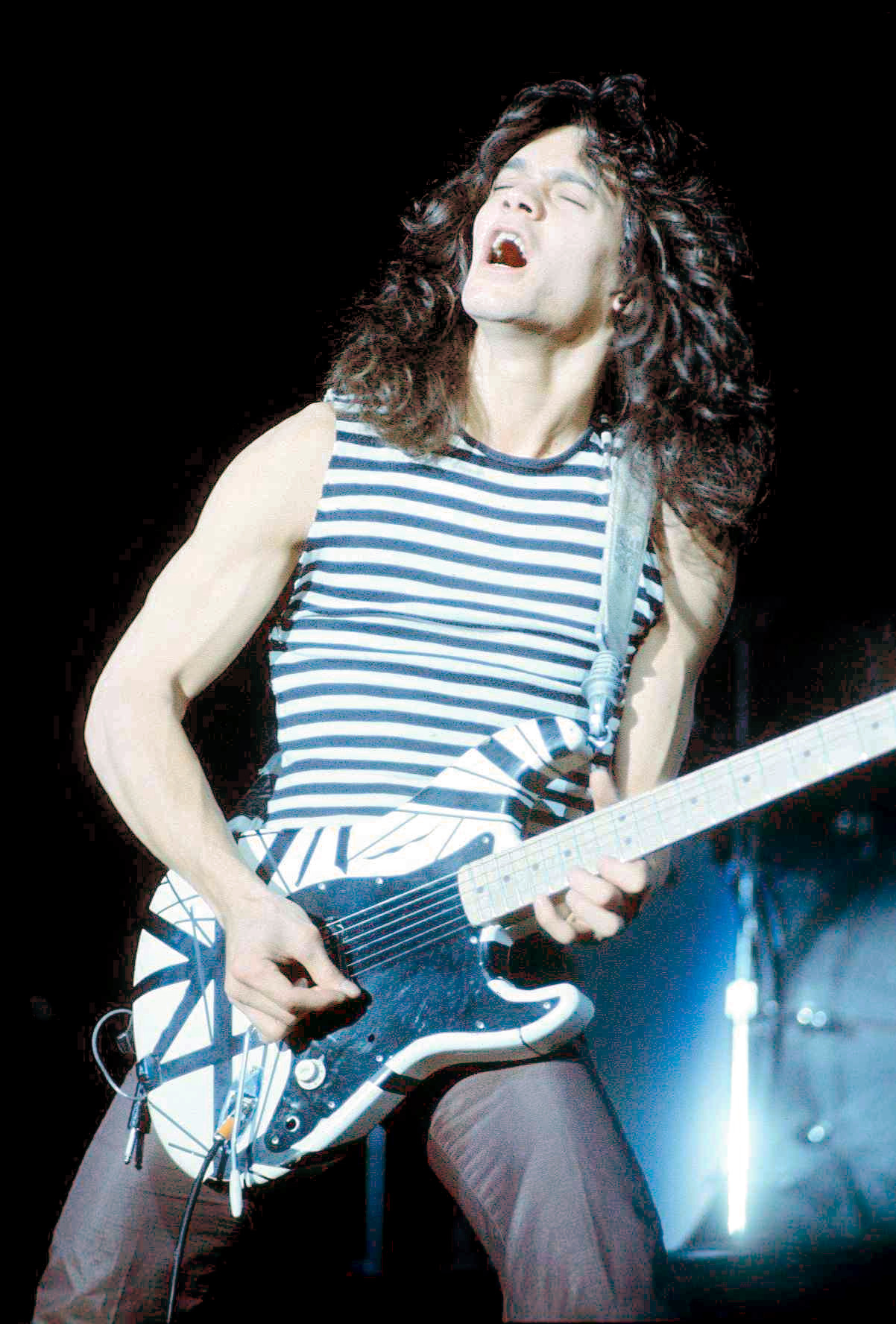
Eddie Van Halen

Van Halen is a hard rock band formed in Pasadena, California in 1972 and consisted of Eddie Van Halen on guitar, keyboards, and vocals, Alex Van Halen on drums and percussion, Michael Anthony (musician) on bass and vocals, and David Lee Roth on lead vocals. They enjoyed success from the release of their self-titled debut album in 1978. As of 2007 Van Halen has sold more than 80 million albums worldwide] and have had the most number one hits on the Billboard (magazine) Mainstream Rock (chart) chart. During the 1980s they also had more Billboard Hot 100 hits than any other hard rock or heavy metal band. According to the Recording Industry Association of America, Van Halen is the 19th best selling band/artist of all time with sales of over 56 million albums in the United States and is one of five rock bands that have had two albums sell more than 10 million copies in the United States.

== American Music Awards ==
The American Music Awards is an annual awards ceremony created by Dick Clark in 1973. Van Halen has received nine nominations, winning just once in 1992.

Year	Nominee / work	Award	Result
1985	Van Halen	Favorite Pop/Rock Band/Duo/Group	Nominated
1987	Van Halen	Favorite Pop/Rock Band/Duo/Group	Nominated
1987	5150	Favorite Pop/Rock Album	Nominated
1989	Van Halen	Favorite Heavy Metal/Hard Rock Artist	Nominated
1989	Van Halen	Favorite Pop/Rock Band/Duo/Group	Nominated
1989	OU812	Favorite Heavy Metal/Hard Rock Album	Nominated
1992	For Unlawful Carnal Knowledge	Favorite Heavy Metal/Hard Rock Album	Won
1992	Van Halen	Best Heavy Metal/Hard Rock Artist	Nominated
1996	Van Halen	Best Heavy Metal/Hard Rock Artist	Nominated

== Grammy Awards ==
The Grammy Awards are awarded annually by the National Academy of Recording Arts and Sciences. Van Halen has received five nominations, winning just once in 1992.

Year	Nominee / work	Award	Result
1985	"Jump"	Best Rock Performance by a Duo or Group with Vocal	Nominated
1985	"Donut City" (Edward Van Halen)	Best Rock Instrumental Performance	Nominated
1992	For Unlawful Carnal Knowledge	Best Hard Rock Performance	Won
1996	"The Seventh Seal"	Best Hard Rock Performance	Nominated
1997	"Respect The Wind" (Edward & Alex Van Halen)	Best Rock Instrumental Performance	Nominated

== MTV Video Music Awards ==
The MTV Video Music Awards is an annual awards ceremony established in 1984 by MTV. Van Halen has received 11 nominations, winning four times.

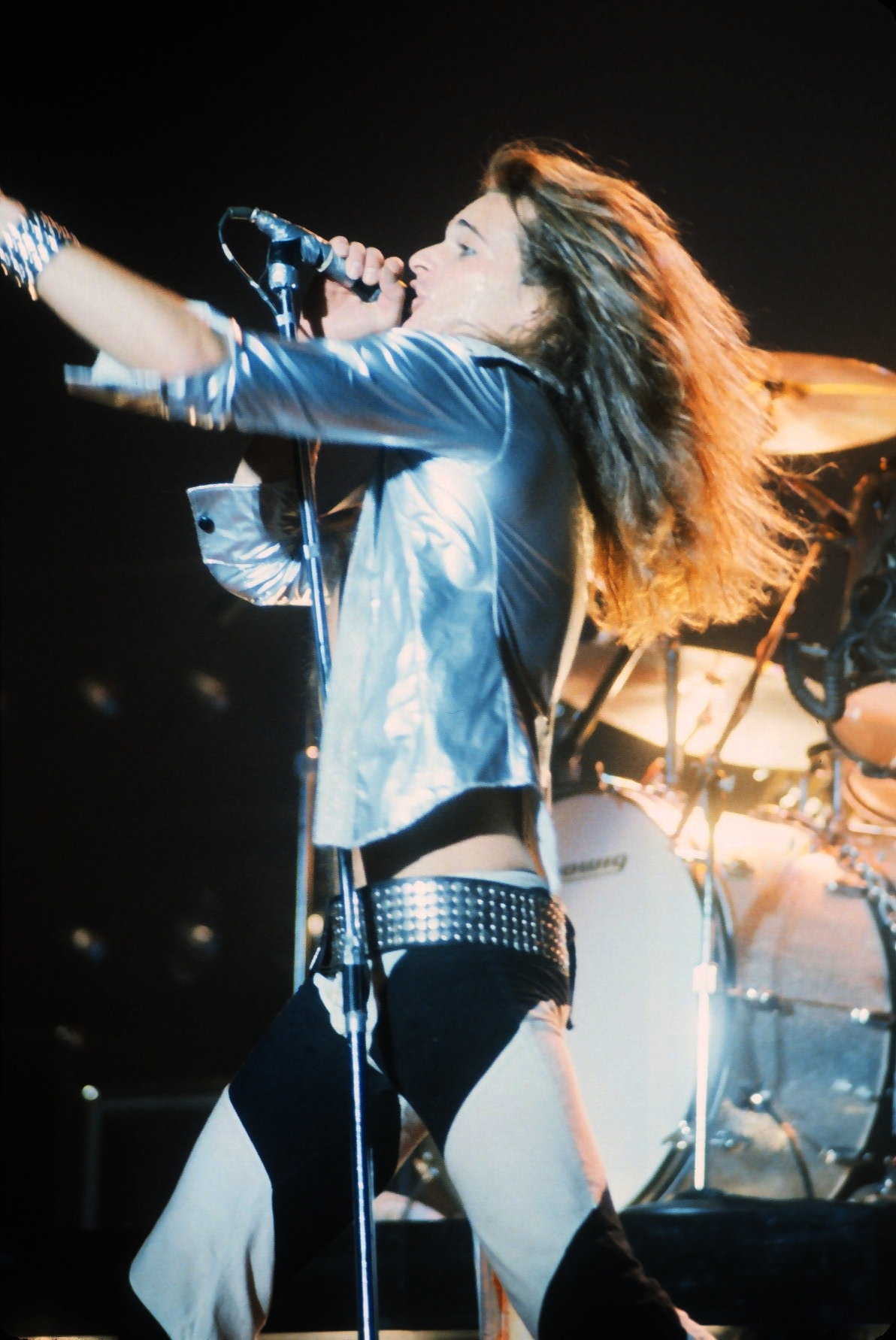
Van Halen singer David Lee Roth

Year	Nominee / work	Award	Result
1984	"Jump"	Best Group Video	Nominated
1984	"Jump"	Best Stage Performance in a Video	Won
1984	"Jump"	Best Overall Performance in a Video	Nominated
1989	"Finish What Ya Started"	Best Direction in a Video (Director: Andy Morahan)	Nominated
1992	"Right Now"	Video of the Year	Won
1992	"Right Now"	Best Group Video	Nominated
1992	"Right Now"	Best Metal/Hard Rock Video	Nominated
1992	"Right Now"	Breakthrough Video	Nominated
1992	"Right Now"	Best Direction in a Video (Director: Mark Fenske)	Won
1992	"Right Now"	Best Editing in a Video (Editor: Mitchell Sinoway)	Won
1992	"Right Now"	Viewer's Choice	Nominated
