= 1987 MTV Video Music Awards =

Award ceremony

- Date: Friday, September 11, 1987
- Location: Universal Amphitheatre, Los Angeles
- Country: United States
- Hosted by: Downtown Julie Brown; Carolyne Heldman; Kevin Seal; Michael Tomioka; Dweezil Zappa
- Most awards: Peter Gabriel (10)
- Most nominations: Peter Gabriel (12)

Television/radio coverage
- Network: MTV
- Produced by: Don Ohlmeyer; Tom Freston
- Directed by: Don Ohlmeyer; Sandi Fullerton

The 1987 MTV Video Music Awards aired live on September 11, 1987, from the Universal Amphitheatre in Los Angeles. Hosted by MTV VJs Downtown Julie Brown, Carolyne Heldman, Kevin Seal, Michael Tomioka, and Dweezil Zappa, the show honored the best music videos released from May 2, 1986, to May 1, 1987.

Nominations from among 644 submissions were announced in August. The MTV Video Music Award for Best Video from a Film, which recognizes the most outstanding video of a song taken from a movie soundtrack, was included for the first time. The Special Recognition award—given out every year since 1984—was presented for the last time, after which it was eliminated from the award lineup altogether.

Peter Gabriel set a record for the most VMA nominations earned in a single year with twelve: he received ten nominations for "Sledgehammer" and two for "Big Time". This would go uncontested until the 2010 ceremony, when Lady Gaga received thirteen nominations. Other major nominees included Genesis, Paul Simon, Steve Winwood, U2, and Madonna. Genesis, Winwood, and U2 all received seven nominations each, for "Land of Confusion", "Higher Love", and "With or Without You" respectively. Simon and Madonna received six nominations apiece, split between "The Boy in the Bubble" and "You Can Call Me Al" for the former, and "Papa Don't Preach" and "Open Your Heart" for the latter.

Gabriel was the most-awarded artist at the show, winning a record ten awards, including Video of the Year and the Video Vanguard Award, with "Sledgehammer"—the most-nominated video of the night—which won nine of the ten awards it was in the running for; it is the most-awarded video in VMA history. He did not attend in person to collect any of his awards as he was on tour in Germany. The only other act to win multiple awards was the rock band Talking Heads, whose video for "Wild Wild Life" won Best Group Video and Best Video from a Film.

== Background ==
MTV announced in mid-June that the 1987 Video Music Awards would be held on September 11. The ceremony broadcast was preceded by a two-hour long Pre-Game Show segment, during which Penn & Teller highlighted the nominated videos.

== Performances ==
Run-D.M.C.'s performance at the show marked the first time that a rap act appeared on the MTV stage.

List of musical performances in order of appearance
Artist(s)	Song(s)	Ref.
Los Lobos	"La Bamba"	
Bryan Adams	"Only the Strong Survive" "Victim of Love"	
The Bangles	"Walk Like an Egyptian" "Walking Down Your Street"	
Bon Jovi	"Livin' on a Prayer" (Note: live from New York City)	
Crowded House	"Don't Dream It's Over" "Now We're Getting Somewhere"	
Madonna	"Causing a Commotion" (Note: live from Italy)	
Whitesnake	"Still of the Night"	
Whitney Houston	"I Wanna Dance with Somebody (Who Loves Me)" (Note: Pre-recorded at the Saratoga Performing Arts Center in Saratoga Springs, New York)	
The Cars	"You Are the Girl" "Double Trouble"	
David Bowie	"Never Let Me Down" (Note: live from Montreal)	
Prince	"Sign o' the Times" "Play in the Sunshine"	
Whitney Houston	"Didn't We Almost Have It All"	
Cyndi Lauper	"Change of Heart" "True Colors"	
Run-D.M.C. Steven Tyler; Joe Perry	"Walk This Way"	

== Presenters ==
- Howie Mandel – presented Best New Artist in a Video
- Dweezil Zappa – introduced the nominees of the Viewer's Choice award and later briefly interviewed Los Lobos
- Laurie Anderson – presented the Video Vanguard Award to Peter Gabriel
- Richard Wilkins – briefly interviewed Glenn Frey and introduced the next presenter
- Cyndi Lauper – presented Most Experimental Video
- Tina Turner – presented Best Male Video
- Blake Clark – performed a short stand-up routine and introduced a "Randee of the Redwoods" video package
- Robbie Nevil – presented Best Overall Performance in a Video
- Kevin Seal – briefly interviewed Richard Page and introduced the next presenter
- Whoopi Goldberg – presented Best Stage Performance in a Video
- Vanna White – presented Best Choreography in a Video
- Marcel Vanthilt – briefly interviewed Herbie Hancock and introduced the next presenters
- Poison – presented Best Female Video
- Carolyne Heldman – briefly interviewed Cher, Ally Sheedy, Dan Schneider and Brian Robbins
- Bobcat Goldthwait – performed a short stand-up routine and introduced the winner of Best Art Direction in a Video
- Glenn Frey – presented the Special Recognition Award
- Kenny Loggins – presented Best Direction in a Video
- Steve Guttenberg – presented Best Video from a Film
- Sandra Bernhard – presented Best Concept Video
- Eddie Money – introduced the winner of Best Special Effects in a Video
- Michael Tomioka – briefly interviewed "Weird Al" Yankovic and introduced the next presenter
- Judy Tenuta – introduced the winners of Best Editing in a Video and Best Cinematography in a Video
- Robin Leach – introduced a video package on show-business scandals
- Stevie Nicks and Christine McVie – presented Best Group Video
- David Bowie – presented the Video Vanguard Award to Julien Temple
- Cher – presented Viewer's Choice
- Huey Lewis – presented Video of the Year

== Winners and nominees ==
Nominations were announced on Wednesday August 5. Nominees were selected from among "644 videos acquired and exhibited for the first time on MTV between May 2, 1986, and May 1, 1987", and voted on by the National Video Academy, comprising 1500 representatives from the music and video industry who were selected by MTV's Video Awards Executive Committee. For the first time, voting for the Viewer's Choice award was carried out "via newspaper write-in ballots" from USA Today and "an 800 telephone number that MTV viewers can use...for two weeks at the end of August and the beginning of September".

Winners are listed first and highlighted in bold.

Video of the Year	Best Male Video
**Peter Gabriel – "Sledgehammer"**; Genesis – "Land of Confusion"; Paul Simon – "The Boy in the Bubble"; U2 – "With or Without You"; Steve Winwood – "Higher Love"	**Peter Gabriel – "Sledgehammer"**; David Bowie – "Day-In Day-Out"; Robert Palmer – "I Didn't Mean to Turn You On"; Paul Simon – "You Can Call Me Al"; Steve Winwood – "Higher Love"
Best Female Video	Best Group Video
**Madonna – "Papa Don't Preach"**; Kate Bush – "The Big Sky"; Janet Jackson – "Nasty"; Cyndi Lauper – "True Colors"; Madonna – "Open Your Heart"	**Talking Heads – "Wild Wild Life"**; The Bangles – "Walk Like an Egyptian"; Crowded House – "Don't Dream It's Over"; Eurythmics – "Missionary Man"; U2 – "With or Without You"
Best New Artist in a Video	Best Concept Video
**Crowded House – "Don't Dream It's Over"**; Robert Cray – "Smoking Gun"; The Georgia Satellites – "Keep Your Hands to Yourself"; Bruce Hornsby and the Range – "The Way It Is"; Timbuk3 – "The Future's So Bright, I Gotta Wear Shades"	**Peter Gabriel – "Sledgehammer"**; Eurythmics – "Missionary Man"; Peter Gabriel – "Big Time"; Genesis – "Land of Confusion"; Talking Heads – "Wild Wild Life"
Best Video from a Film	Most Experimental Video
**Talking Heads – "Wild Wild Life" (from True Stories)**; Eric Clapton – "It's in the Way That You Use It" (from The Color of Money); Rodney Dangerfield – "Twist and Shout" (from Back to School); Aretha Franklin – "Jumpin' Jack Flash" (from Jumpin' Jack Flash); Ben E. King – "Stand by Me" (from Stand by Me)	**Peter Gabriel – "Sledgehammer"**; Eurythmics – "Missionary Man"; Genesis – "Land of Confusion"; Huey Lewis and the News – "Hip to Be Square"; Paul Simon – "The Boy in the Bubble"
Best Stage Performance in a Video	Best Overall Performance in a Video
**Bon Jovi – "Livin' on a Prayer"**; Bon Jovi – "You Give Love a Bad Name"; Run-D.M.C. – "Walk This Way"; Bruce Springsteen and the E Street Band – "Born to Run"; Bruce Springsteen and the E Street Band – "War"	**Peter Gabriel – "Sledgehammer"**; Janet Jackson – "Nasty"; Madonna – "Papa Don't Preach"; Run-D.M.C. – "Walk This Way"; U2 – "With or Without You"
Best Direction in a Video	Best Choreography in a Video
**Peter Gabriel – "Sledgehammer" (Director: Stephen R. Johnson)**; Crowded House – "Don't Dream It's Over" (Director: Alex Proyas); Genesis – "Land of Confusion" (Directors: Jim Yukich and John Lloyd); U2 – "With or Without You" (Director: Meiert Avis); Steve Winwood – "Higher Love" (Directors: Peter Kagan and Paula Greif)	**Janet Jackson – "Nasty" (Choreographer: Paula Abdul)**; The Bangles – "Walk Like an Egyptian" (Choreographer: Wendy Biller); Janet Jackson – "When I Think of You" (Choreographers: Paula Abdul and Michael Kidd); Madonna – "Open Your Heart" (Choreographer: Brad Jeffries); Steve Winwood – "Higher Love" (Choreographer: Ed Love)
Best Special Effects in a Video	Best Art Direction in a Video
**Peter Gabriel – "Sledgehammer" (Special Effects: Peter Lord)**; Eurythmics – "Missionary Man" (Special Effects: Willy Smax); Peter Gabriel – "Big Time" (Special Effects: Peter Wallach); Genesis – "Land of Confusion" (Special Effects: Jim Yukich and John Lloyd); Paul Simon – "The Boy in the Bubble" (Special Effects: Jim Blashfield)	**Peter Gabriel – "Sledgehammer" (Art Directors: Stephen Quay and Timothy Quay)**; Breakfast Club – "Right on Track" (Art Directors: Allie Willis and Bryan Jones); Genesis – "Land of Confusion" (Art Directors: John Lloyd, Jim Yukich and Stephen Bendelack); Madonna – "Open Your Heart" (Art Director: Mike Hanan); Paul Simon – "The Boy in the Bubble" (Art Director: Jim Blashfield)
Best Editing in a Video	Best Cinematography in a Video
**Peter Gabriel – "Sledgehammer" (Editor: Colin Green)**; Bon Jovi – "Wanted Dead or Alive" (Editor: Lisa Hendricks); Eurythmics – "Missionary Man" (Editor: John Carroll); Robbie Nevil – "C'est la Vie" (Editor: Rick Elgood); U2 – "With or Without You" (Editor: Meiert Avis); Steve Winwood – "Higher Love" (Editors: Peter Kagan, Laura Israel and Glen Lazzarro)	**Robbie Nevil – "C'est la Vie" (Director of Photography: Mark Plummer)**; Cyndi Lauper – "What's Going On" (Director of Photography: Juan Ruiz Anchía); Madonna – "Papa Don't Preach" (Director of Photography: Michael Ballhaus); U2 – "With or Without You" (Director of Photography: Daniel Pearl and Matt Mahurin); Steve Winwood – "Higher Love" (Director of Photography: Peter Kagan)
Viewer's Choice	Video Vanguard Award
**U2 – "With or Without You"**; Peter Gabriel – "Sledgehammer"; Genesis – "Land of Confusion"; Paul Simon – "The Boy in the Bubble"; Steve Winwood – "Higher Love"	**Peter Gabriel**; **Julien Temple**
Special Recognition Award
**Elton John**; **Bernie Taupin**

== Artists with multiple wins and nominations ==
Artists who received multiple awards
Wins	Artist
10	Peter Gabriel
2	Talking Heads

Artists who received multiple nominations
Nominations	Artist
12	Peter Gabriel
7	Genesis
7	Steve Winwood
7	U2
6	Madonna
6	Paul Simon
5	Eurythmics
4	Janet Jackson
3	Bon Jovi
3	Crowded House
3	Talking Heads
2	Bruce Springsteen
2	Cyndi Lauper
2	Paula Abdul
2	Robbie Nevil
2	Run-D.M.C.
2	The Bangles

== Music Videos with multiple wins and nominations ==
Music Videos that received multiple awards
Wins	Artist	Music Video
9	Peter Gabriel	"Sledgehammer"
2	Talking Heads	"Wild Wild Life"

Music Videos that received multiple nominations
Nominations	Artist	Music Video
10	Peter Gabriel	"Sledgehammer"
7	Genesis	"Land of Confusion"
7	U2	"With or Without You"
7	Steve Winwood	"Higher Love"
5	Eurythmics	"Missionary Man"
5	Paul Simon	"The Boy in the Bubble"
3	Crowded House	"Don't Dream It's Over"
3	Janet Jackson	"Nasty"
3	Madonna	"Open Your Heart"
3	Madonna	"Papa Don't Preach"
3	Talking Heads	"Wild Wild Life"
2	The Bangles	"Walk Like an Egyptian"
2	Peter Gabriel	"Big Time"
2	Robbie Nevil	"C'est la Vie"
2	Run-D.M.C.	"Walk This Way"
