= MTV Video Music Award for Best Concept Video =

Annual music video award

- "Learning to Fly" by Pink Floyd was the last recipient of this award.
- Country: United States
- Presented by: MTV
- First award: 1984
- Final award: 1988
- Currently held by: Pink Floyd – "Learning to Fly" (1988)
- Website: VMA website

The MTV Video Music Award for Best Concept Video was first given out in 1984, awarding the best videos that involved the conceptual interpretation of a song.

As the years went on, however, the majority of videos aired on MTV became concept videos, and so the need for this category diminished.

The category was retired in 1988.

With three nominations, Talking Heads are the most nominated act in this category.

== Recipients ==
=== 1980s ===
Recipients
Year (Note: Each year is linked to the article about the MTV Video Music Awards held that year.)	Winner(s)	Video	Nominees	Ref.
1984	Herbie Hancock	"Rockit"	The Cars – "You Might Think"; Michael Jackson – "Thriller"; Cyndi Lauper – "Girls Just Want to Have Fun"; The Rolling Stones – "Undercover of the Night"	
1985	Glenn Frey	"Smuggler's Blues"	Frankie Goes to Hollywood – "Two Tribes"; Don Henley – "The Boys of Summer"; Tom Petty and the Heartbreakers – "Don't Come Around Here No More"; David Lee Roth – "Just a Gigolo" / "I Ain't Got Nobody"	
1986	a-ha	"Take On Me"	Dire Straits – "Money for Nothing"; Godley & Creme – "Cry"; Talking Heads – "And She Was"; Talking Heads – "Road to Nowhere"	
1987	Peter Gabriel	"Sledgehammer"	Eurythmics – "Missionary Man"; Peter Gabriel – "Big Time"; Genesis – "Land of Confusion"; Talking Heads – "Wild Wild Life"	
1988	Pink Floyd	"Learning to Fly"	George Harrison – "When We Was Fab"; INXS – "Need You Tonight" / "Mediate"; U2 – "I Still Haven't Found What I'm Looking For"; XTC – "Dear God"	
