= MTV Video Music Award – Viewer's Choice =

Annual music video award

MTV Video Music Award for Viewer's Choice
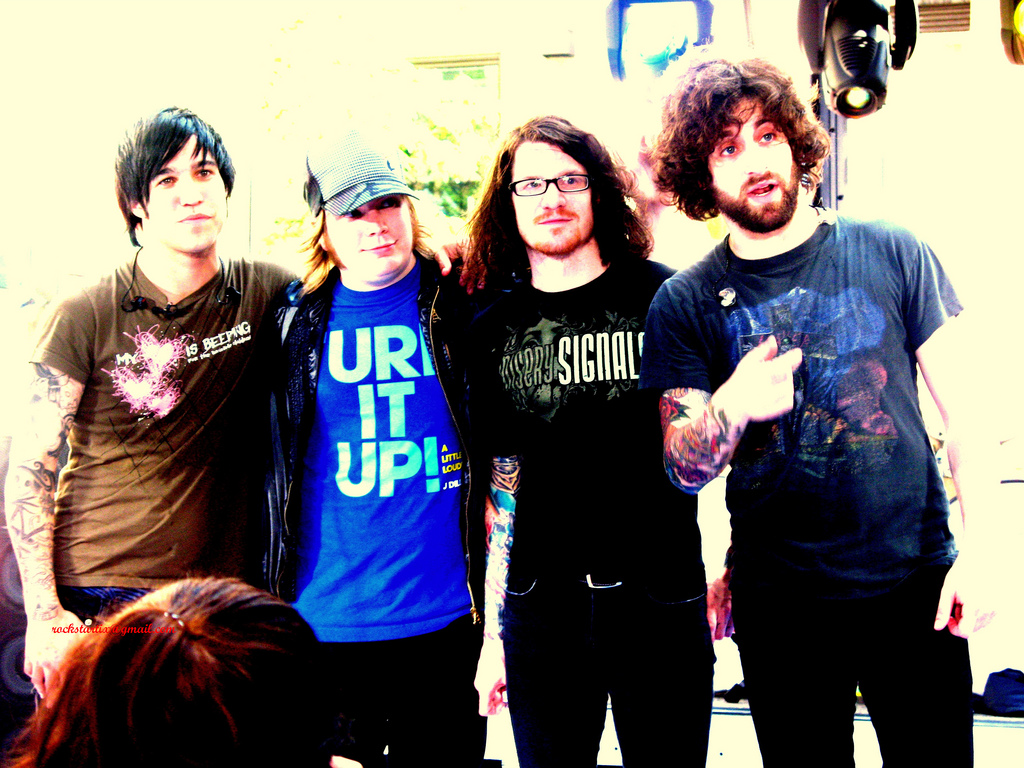
- "Dance, Dance" by Fall Out Boy was the last recipient of this award.
- Country: United States
- Presented by: MTV
- First award: 1984
- Final award: 2006
- Currently held by: "Dance, Dance" – Fall Out Boy (2006)

Highlights
- Most awards: Aerosmith (3)
- Most nominations: R.E.M. (4)
- Website: VMA website

The MTV Video Music Award for Viewer's Choice was first awarded at the first annual MTV Video Music Awards in 1984. Until 1994, the Viewer's Choice award nominees were the same as the Video of the Year nominees. In 1995 MTV created a separate set of nominees for Viewer's Choice and Video of the Year (although, TLC's "Waterfalls" won both that year). This continued for the rest of the award's history.

As the name indicated, the winner was decided by audience members, who could vote up until the very night of the show via phone calls and, later on, internet votes and text messages. This award was last given out at the 2006 ceremony, in which all general categories became fan-voted, seemingly rendering the award redundant. The following year, MTV revamped the VMAs and eliminated the Viewer's Choice award, permanently transferring its voting procedures over to the Best New Artist award.

Aerosmith is the biggest winner of this award, having won it three times. Also, only four acts—INXS, Aerosmith, TLC, and Green Day—have won both the Video of the Year and Viewer's Choice awards on the same year (though Green Day won each award with a different video in 2005).

== Recipients ==
Year	Winner	Other nominees
1984	Michael Jackson — "Thriller"	The Cars — "You Might Think"; Herbie Hancock — "Rockit"; Cyndi Lauper — "Girls Just Want to Have Fun"; The Police — "Every Breath You Take"
1985	USA for Africa — "We Are the World"	Don Henley — "The Boys of Summer"; Tom Petty and the Heartbreakers — "Don't Come Around Here No More"; David Lee Roth — "California Girls"; David Lee Roth — "Just a Gigolo/I Ain't Got Nobody"
1986	a-ha — "Take On Me"	Dire Straits — "Money for Nothing"; Godley & Creme — "Cry"; Robert Palmer — "Addicted to Love"; Talking Heads — "Road to Nowhere"
1987	U2 — "With or Without You"	Peter Gabriel — "Sledgehammer"; Genesis — "Land of Confusion"; Paul Simon — "The Boy in the Bubble"; Steve Winwood — "Higher Love"
1988	INXS — "Need You Tonight/Mediate"	George Harrison — "When We Was Fab"; Bruce Springsteen — "Tunnel of Love"; U2 — "I Still Haven't Found What I'm Looking For"; U2 — "Where the Streets Have No Name"
1989	Madonna — "Like a Prayer"	Fine Young Cannibals — "She Drives Me Crazy"; Michael Jackson — "Leave Me Alone"; Steve Winwood — "Roll with It"; Neil Young — "This Note's for You"
1990	Aerosmith — "Janie's Got a Gun"	Don Henley — "The End of the Innocence"; Madonna — "Vogue"; Sinéad O'Connor — "Nothing Compares 2 U"
1991	Queensrÿche — "Silent Lucidity"	C+C Music Factory — "Gonna Make You Sweat (Everybody Dance Now)"; Deee-Lite — "Groove Is in the Heart"; Divinyls — "I Touch Myself"; Chris Isaak — "Wicked Game (Concept)"; R.E.M. — "Losing My Religion"
1992	Red Hot Chili Peppers — "Under the Bridge"	Def Leppard — "Let's Get Rocked"; Nirvana — "Smells Like Teen Spirit"; Van Halen — "Right Now"
1993	Aerosmith — "Livin' on the Edge"	En Vogue — "Free Your Mind"; Peter Gabriel — "Digging in the Dirt"; Pearl Jam — "Jeremy"; R.E.M. — "Man on the Moon"
1994	Aerosmith — "Cryin'"	Beastie Boys — "Sabotage"; Nirvana — "Heart-Shaped Box"; R.E.M. — "Everybody Hurts"
1995	TLC — "Waterfalls"	Green Day — "Basket Case"; Hootie & the Blowfish — "Hold My Hand"; Michael Jackson and Janet Jackson - "Scream"; Live — "Lightning Crashes"; R.E.M. — "What's the Frequency, Kenneth?"
1996	Bush — "Glycerine"	Bone Thugs-n-Harmony — "Tha Crossroads"; Coolio (featuring L.V.) — "Gangsta's Paradise"; Metallica — "Until It Sleeps"; Alanis Morissette — "Ironic"; The Smashing Pumpkins — "Tonight, Tonight"
1997	The Prodigy — "Breathe"	Jewel — "You Were Meant for Me"; Puff Daddy (featuring Faith Evans and 112) — "I'll Be Missing You"; Spice Girls — "Say You'll Be There"; The Wallflowers — "One Headlight"
1998	Puff Daddy and the Family (featuring The LOX, Lil' Kim, The Notorious B.I.G. and Fuzzbubble) — "It's All about the Benjamins (rock remix)"	Celine Dion — "My Heart Will Go On (Love Theme from Titanic)"; Green Day — "Good Riddance (Time of Your Life)"; Matchbox 20 — "3 A.M."; Will Smith — "Gettin' Jiggy wit It"
1999	Backstreet Boys — "I Want It That Way"	Jay-Z (featuring Ja Rule and Amil) — "Can I Get A..."; Korn — "Freak on a Leash"; Ricky Martin — "Livin' la Vida Loca"; NSYNC — "Tearin' Up My Heart"; TLC — "No Scrubs"
2000	NSYNC — "Bye Bye Bye"	Christina Aguilera — "What a Girl Wants"; Eminem — "The Real Slim Shady"; Sisqó — "Thong Song"; Britney Spears — "Oops!...I Did It Again"
2001	NSYNC — "Pop"	Backstreet Boys — "The Call"; Destiny's Child — "Independent Women Part I"; Eve (featuring Gwen Stefani) — "Let Me Blow Ya Mind"; Limp Bizkit — "My Way"; Nelly — "Ride wit Me"
2002	Michelle Branch — "Everywhere"	B2K — "Uh Huh"; Brandy — "What About Us?"; Eminem — "Without Me"; Enrique Iglesias — "Hero"; P.O.D. — "Alive"
2003	Good Charlotte — "Lifestyles of the Rich and Famous"	50 Cent — "In da Club"; Beyoncé (featuring Jay-Z) — "Crazy in Love"; Kelly Clarkson — "Miss Independent"; Eminem — "Lose Yourself"; Justin Timberlake — "Cry Me a River"
2004	Linkin Park — "Breaking the Habit"	Christina Aguilera — "The Voice Within"; Good Charlotte — "Hold On"; Simple Plan — "Perfect"; Yellowcard — "Ocean Avenue"
2005	Green Day — "American Idiot"	Kelly Clarkson — "Since U Been Gone"; My Chemical Romance — "Helena"; Shakira (featuring Alejandro Sanz) — "La Tortura"; Snoop Dogg (featuring Pharrell) — "Drop It Like It's Hot"
2006	Fall Out Boy — "Dance, Dance"	Chris Brown (featuring Juelz Santana) — "Run It!"; Kelly Clarkson — "Because of You"; Rihanna — "SOS"; Shakira (featuring Wyclef Jean) — "Hips Don't Lie"

== Statistics ==
=== Artists with multiple wins ===
3 wins

- Aerosmith

2 wins

- NSYNC

=== Artists with multiple nominations ===
4 nominations

- R.E.M.

3 nominations

- Aerosmith
- Kelly Clarkson
- Eminem
- Green Day
- Michael Jackson
- NSYNC
- U2

2 nominations

- Christina Aguilera
- Backstreet Boys
- David Lee Roth
- Don Henley
- Good Charlotte
- Jay-Z (Note: 1 as a featured artist.)
- Madonna
- Nirvana
- Peter Gabriel
- Puff Daddy
- Shakira
- Steve Winwood
- TLC
