= MTV Video Music Award for Best Group =

Annual music video award

- BTS is the most recent recipient.
- Country: United States
- Presented by: MTV
- Formerly called: Best Group Video, Group of the Year
- First award: 1984
- Currently held by: BTS (2026)

Highlights
- Most wins: BTS (5)
- Most nominations: U2, Blackpink (7)
- Website: VMA website

The MTV Video Music Award for Best Group is given to recording artists at the MTV Video Music Awards (VMAs). The award was introduced as the MTV Video Music Award for Best Group Video at the inaugural ceremony in 1984 by vocalist Ric Ocasek of the Cars. American rock band ZZ Top was the first act to receive the honor for its "Legs" music video. Tim Newman, the video's director, accepted the award on behalf of the band.

In 2007, a revamp of the ceremony saw the award renamed from Best Group Video to simply Best Group. In 2008, the VMAs returned to their original format, but the award was not included. It was brought back for the 2019 edition of the show, as one of three social-media voted categories, instead of being determined by industry personnel as in previous years. In 2021, it was renamed to the MTV Video Music Award for Group of the Year, though it was changed back to Best Group in 2024. The nominees were usually announced in late August or early September after the main nominees were announced.

BTS is the most-awarded artist in this category, having won the award five times, and is the only nominee to win the award in consecutive years, from 2019 to 2022. U2 and Blackpink are the most-nominated acts, with seven of U2's videos receiving nominations in six different years between 1985 and 2005. TLC was the first girl group to win the award, doing so twice with their videos for "Waterfalls" (1995) and "No Scrubs" (1999). Blackpink is the most-nominated girl group, having received seven nominations from 2019 to 2026, and was the second girl group after TLC to win the award in 2023.

== Recipients ==
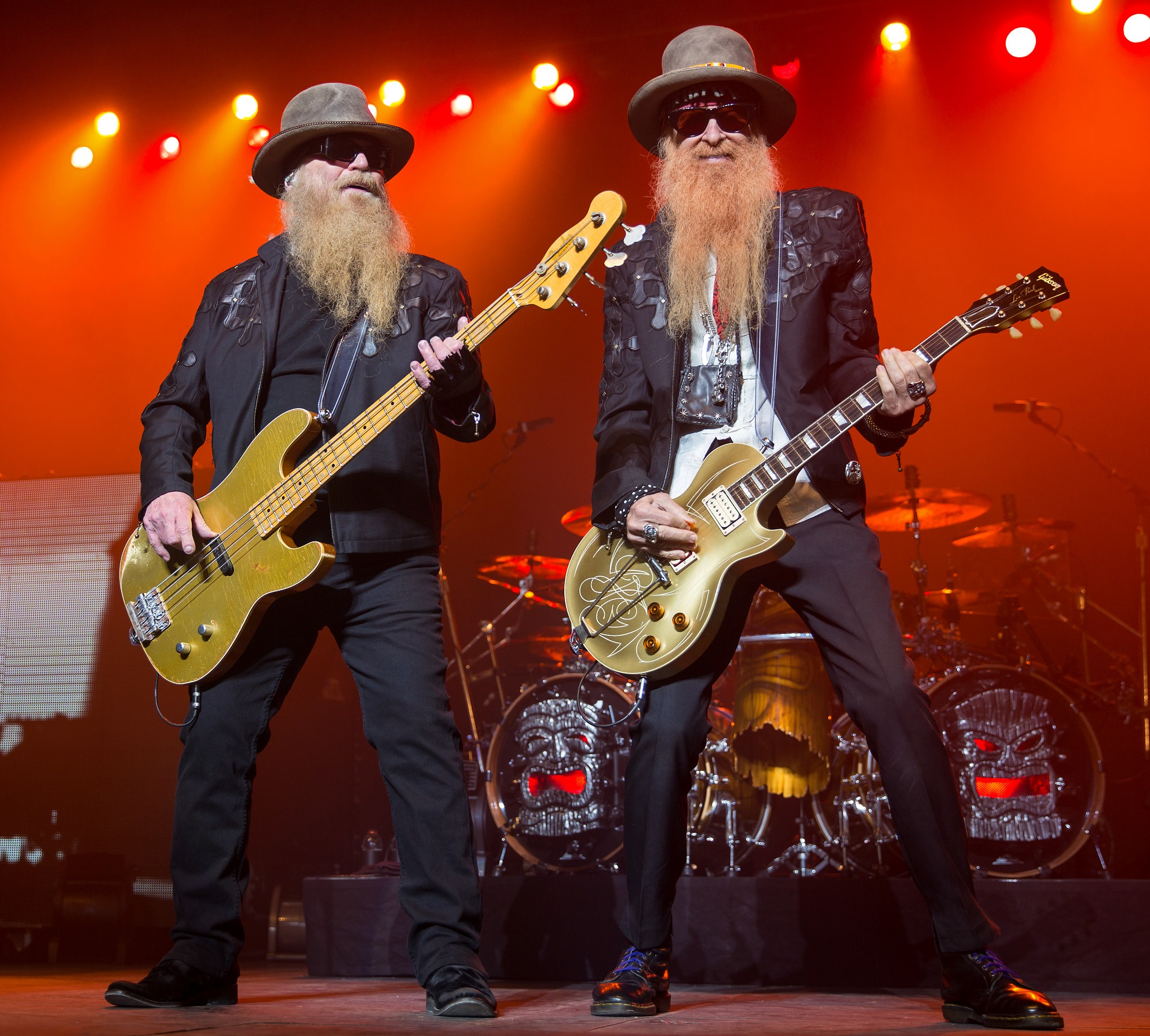
ZZ Top was the first act to win the award at the inaugural show in 1984.

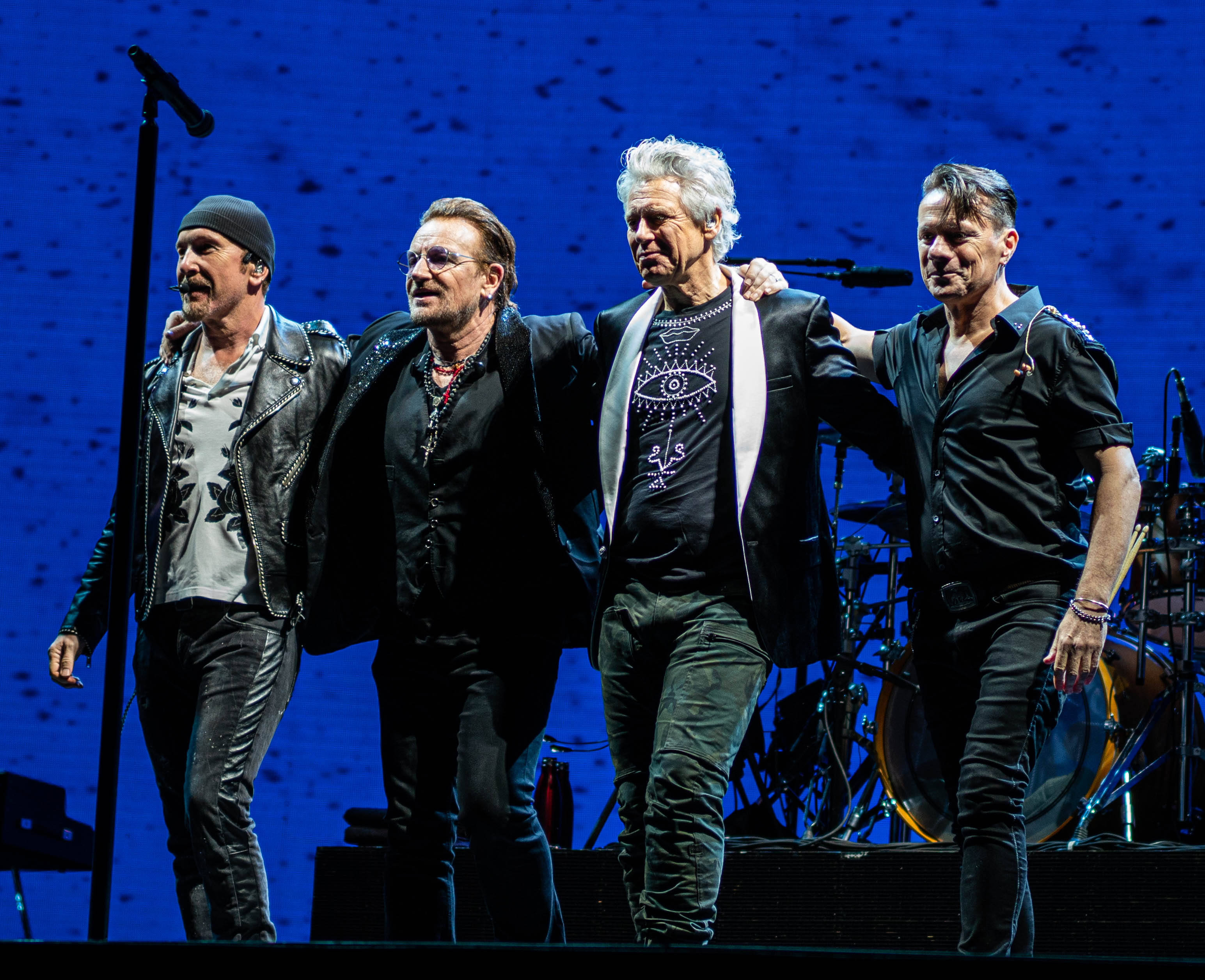
U2 has been nominated seven times, tied for the most of any act, for seven different music videos over the course of ten years.

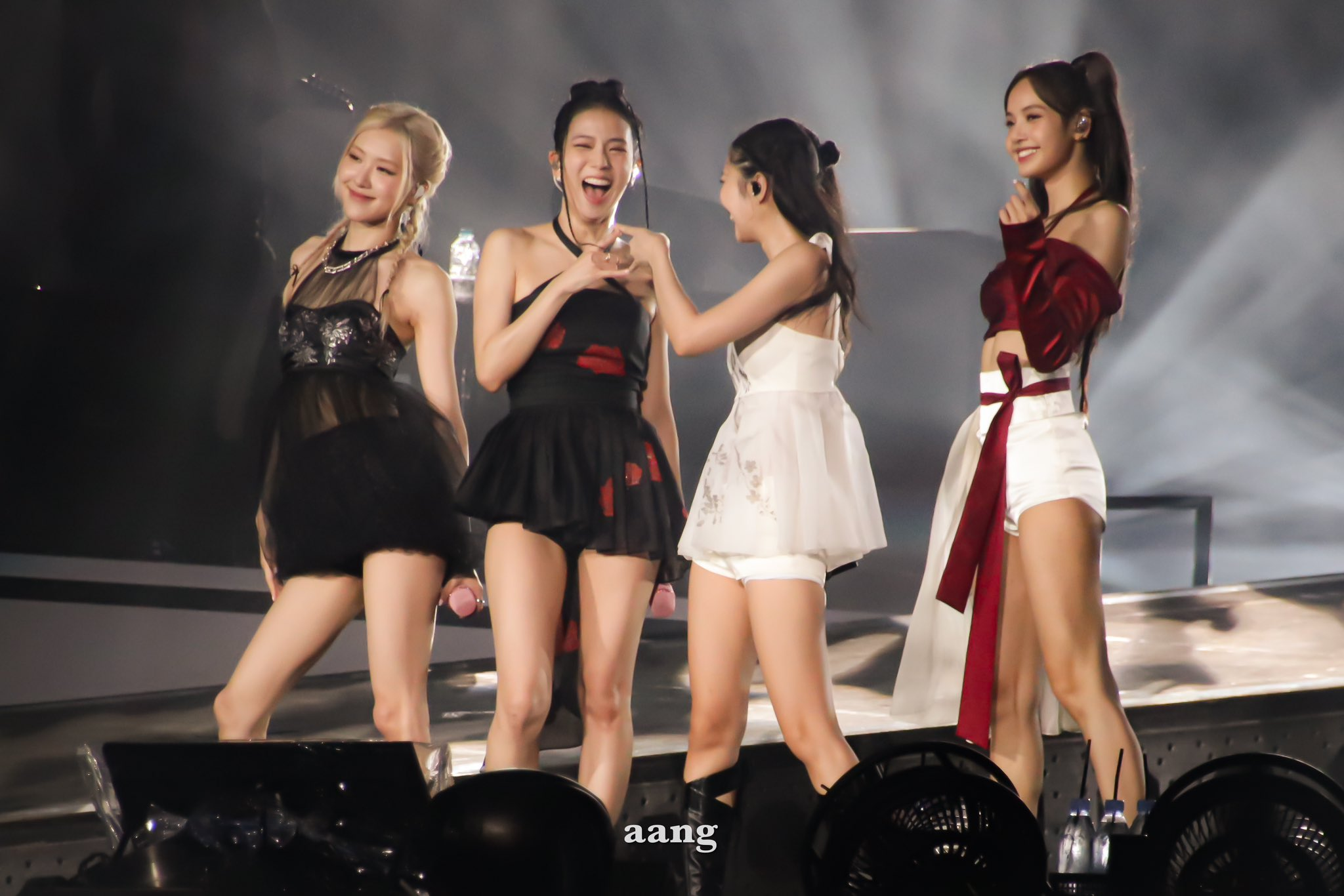
Blackpink is tied as the most-nominated act with seven nominations, as well as the most-awarded girl group in the category with 2 wins.

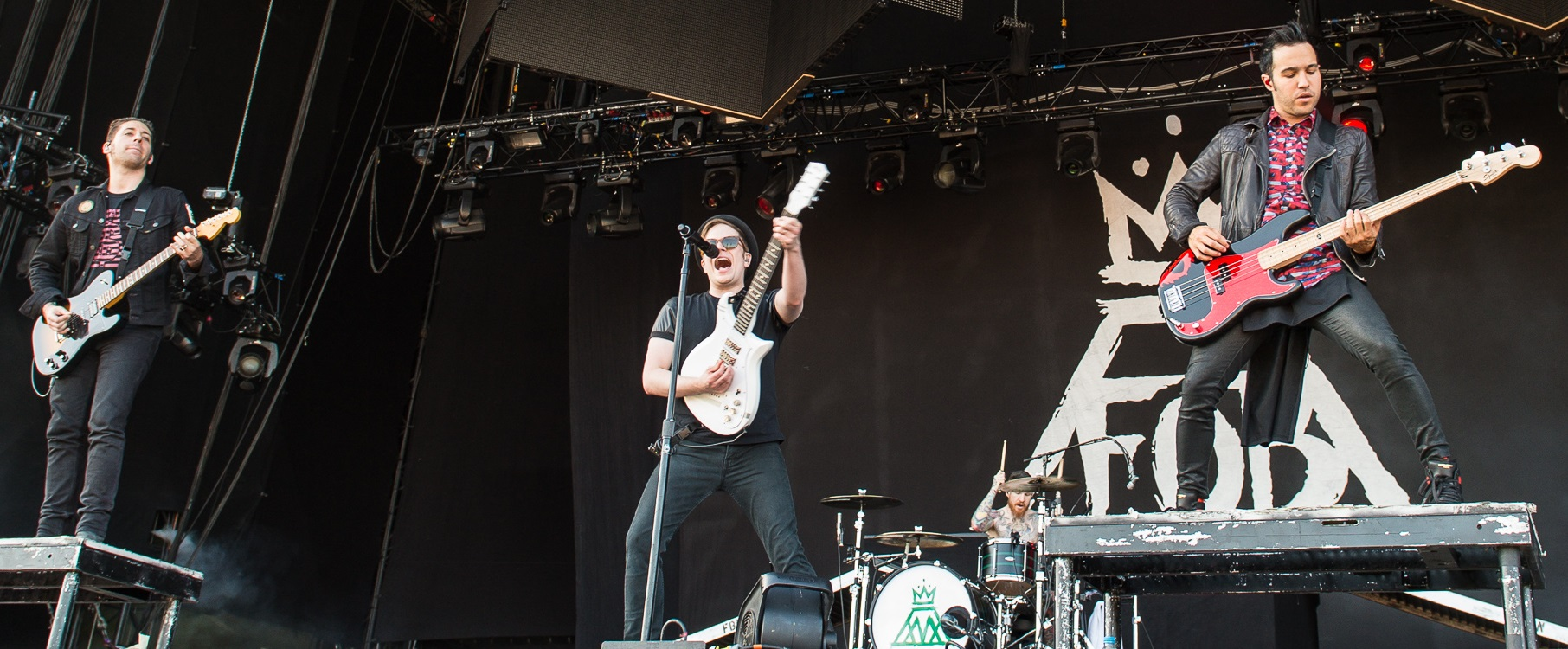
Fall Out Boy was the first artist to win the award under its new name, Best Group, in 2007.

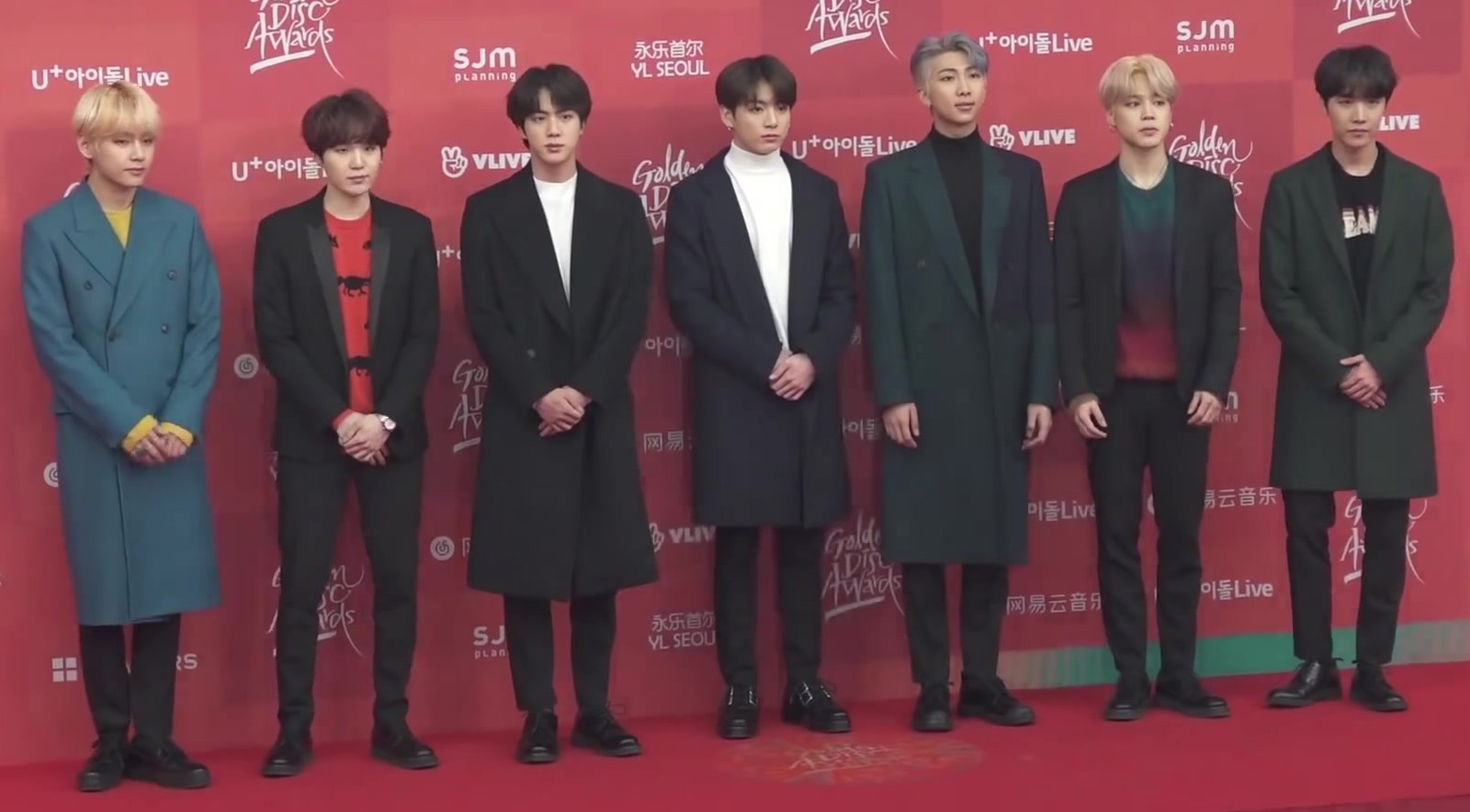
BTS is the most-awarded act in the category, having won five times. They are also the only nominee to consecutively win the award, from 2019 to 2022.

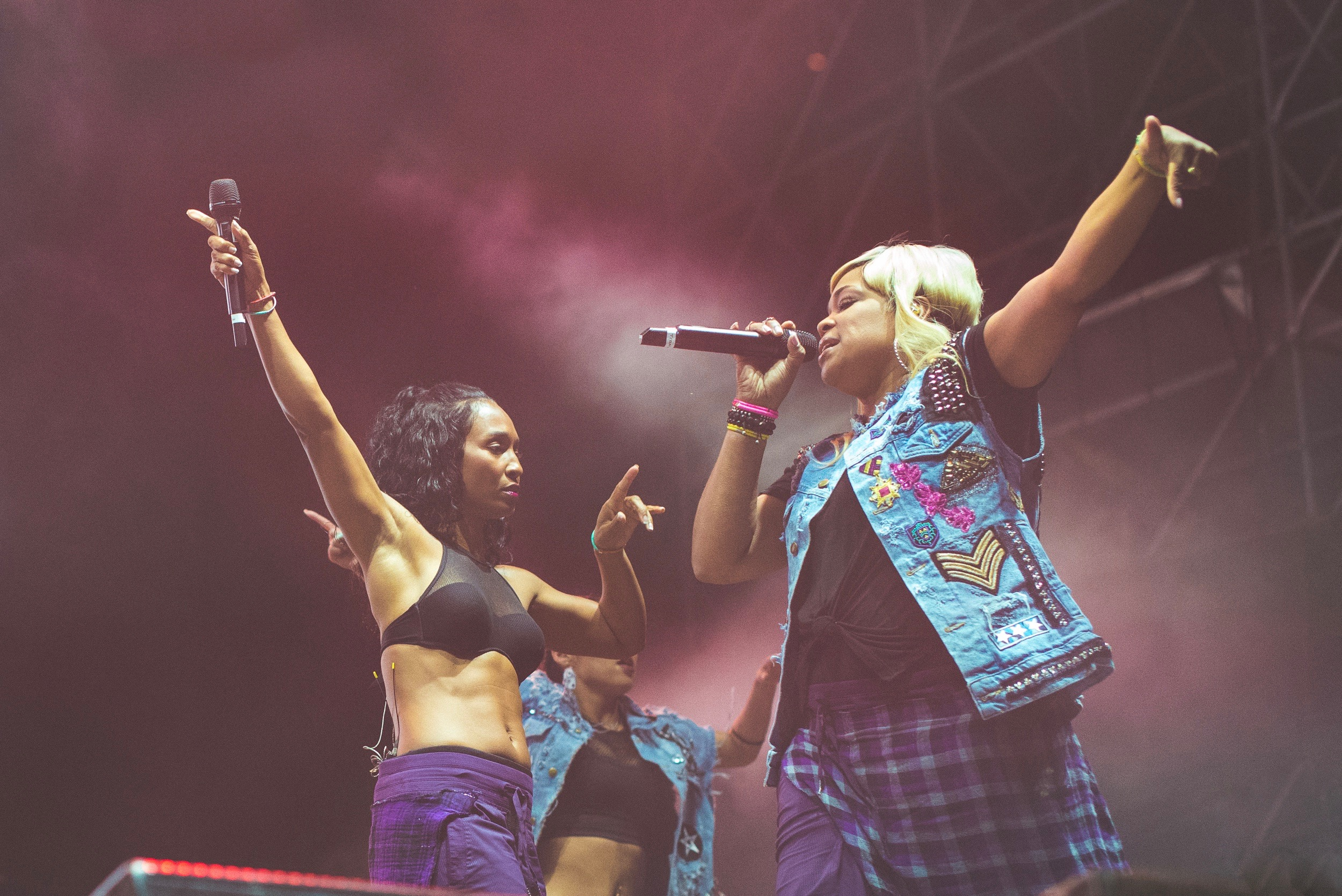
TLC ties for the most-awarded girl group in the category, having won twice.

Key
| † | Marks winners of the MTV Video Music Award for Video of the Year |
| * | Marks nominees of the MTV Video Music Award for Video of the Year |

=== 1980s ===
Recipients
| Year (Note: Each year is linked to the article about the MTV Video Music Awards held that year.) | Winner(s) | Nominees | Ref. |
|---|---|---|---|
| 1984 | ZZ Top – "Legs" | Huey Lewis and the News – "The Heart of Rock & Roll"; The Police * – "Every Breath You Take" *; Van Halen – "Jump"; ZZ Top – "Sharp Dressed Man" | |
| 1985 | USA for Africa * – "We Are the World" * | The Cars – "Drive"; Eurythmics – "Would I Lie to You?"; Huey Lewis and the News – "If This Is It"; U2 – "Pride (In the Name of Love)" | |
| 1986 | Dire Straits † – "Money for Nothing" † | a-ha * – "Take On Me" *; INXS – "What You Need"; The Rolling Stones – "Harlem Shuffle"; Talking Heads – "And She Was" | |
| 1987 | Talking Heads – "Wild Wild Life" | The Bangles – "Walk Like an Egyptian"; Crowded House – "Don't Dream It's Over"; Eurythmics – "Missionary Man"; U2 * – "With or Without You" * | |
| 1988 | INXS † – "Need You Tonight" / "Mediate" † | Aerosmith – "Dude (Looks Like a Lady)"; Eurythmics – "I Need a Man"; U2 * – "I Still Haven't Found What I'm Looking For" *; U2 * – "Where the Streets Have No Name" * | |
| 1989 | Living Colour – "Cult of Personality" | Fine Young Cannibals * – "She Drives Me Crazy" *; Guns N' Roses – "Sweet Child o' Mine"; Traveling Wilburys – "Handle with Care" | |

=== 1990s ===
Recipients
| Year | Winner(s) | Nominees | Ref. |
|---|---|---|---|
| 1990 | The B-52's – "Love Shack" | Aerosmith * – "Janie's Got a Gun" *; Midnight Oil – "Blue Sky Mine"; Red Hot Chili Peppers – "Higher Ground"; Tears for Fears – "Sowing the Seeds of Love" | |
| 1991 | R.E.M. † – "Losing My Religion" † | The Black Crowes – "She Talks to Angels"; Divinyls * – "I Touch Myself" *; Queensrÿche * – "Silent Lucidity" * | |
| 1992 | U2 – "Even Better Than the Real Thing" | En Vogue – "My Lovin' (You're Never Gonna Get It)"; Red Hot Chili Peppers – "Under the Bridge" *; Van Halen † – "Right Now" † | |
| 1993 | Pearl Jam † – "Jeremy" † | Depeche Mode – "I Feel You"; En Vogue * – "Free Your Mind" *; R.E.M. * – "Man on the Moon" * | |
| 1994 | Aerosmith † – "Cryin'" † | Beastie Boys * – "Sabotage" *; Green Day – "Longview"; R.E.M. * – "Everybody Hurts" * | |
| 1995 | TLC † – "Waterfalls" † | Green Day * – "Basket Case" *; The Rolling Stones – "Love Is Strong"; Stone Temple Pilots – "Interstate Love Song" | |
| 1996 | Foo Fighters * – "Big Me" * | Bone Thugs-n-Harmony * – "Tha Crossroads" *; The Fugees – "Killing Me Softly"; Hootie & the Blowfish – "Only Wanna Be with You" | |
| 1997 | No Doubt * – "Don't Speak" * | Blur – "Song 2"; Counting Crows – "A Long December"; Dave Matthews Band – "Crash into Me"; The Wallflowers – "One Headlight" | |
| 1998 | Backstreet Boys – "Everybody (Backstreet's Back)" | Garbage – "Push It"; Matchbox 20 – "3 A.M."; Radiohead – "Karma Police"; The Verve * – "Bitter Sweet Symphony" * | |
| 1999 | TLC – "No Scrubs" | Backstreet Boys * – "I Want It That Way" *; Limp Bizkit – "Nookie"; *NSYNC – "Tearin' Up My Heart"; Sugar Ray – "Every Morning" | |

=== 2000s ===
Recipients
| Year | Winner(s) | Nominees | Ref. |
|---|---|---|---|
| 2000 | Blink-182 * – "All the Small Things" * | Destiny's Child – "Say My Name"; Foo Fighters – "Learn to Fly"; *NSYNC * – "Bye Bye Bye" *; Red Hot Chili Peppers * – "Californication" * | |
| 2001 | *NSYNC – "Pop" | Destiny's Child – "Survivor"; Incubus – "Drive"; Dave Matthews Band – "I Did It"; U2 – "Elevation (Tomb Raider Mix)" | |
| 2002 | No Doubt (featuring Bounty Killer) – "Hey Baby" | Blink-182 – "First Date"; Linkin Park * – "In the End" *; Dave Matthews Band – "Everyday"; *NSYNC (featuring Nelly) – "Girlfriend (Remix)"; P.O.D. * – "Alive" * | |
| 2003 | Coldplay – "The Scientist" | B2K (featuring P. Diddy) – "Bump, Bump, Bump"; The Donnas – "Take It Off"; Good Charlotte – "Lifestyles of the Rich and Famous"; The White Stripes – "Seven Nation Army" | |
| 2004 | No Doubt – "It's My Life" | D12 * – "My Band" *; Good Charlotte – "Hold On"; Hoobastank – "The Reason"; Maroon 5 – "This Love" | |
| 2005 | Green Day † – "Boulevard of Broken Dreams" † | The Black Eyed Peas – "Don't Phunk with My Heart"; Destiny's Child (featuring T.I. and Lil Wayne) – "Soldier"; The Killers – "Mr. Brightside"; U2 – "Vertigo" | |
| 2006 | The All-American Rejects – "Move Along" | Fall Out Boy – "Dance, Dance"; Gnarls Barkley – "Crazy"; Panic! at the Disco † – "I Write Sins Not Tragedies" †; Red Hot Chili Peppers * – "Dani California" * | |
| 2007 | Fall Out Boy | Gym Class Heroes; Linkin Park; Maroon 5; The White Stripes | |
| 2008 – 2009 | —N/a | | |

=== 2010s ===
Recipients
| Year | Winner(s) | Nominees | Ref. |
|---|---|---|---|
| 2010 – 2018 | —N/a | | |
| 2019 | BTS | 5 Seconds of Summer; Backstreet Boys; Blackpink; CNCO; Jonas Brothers; PrettyMuch; Why Don't We | |

=== 2020s ===
Recipients
| Year | Winner(s) | Nominees | Ref. |
|---|---|---|---|
| 2020 | BTS | 5 Seconds of Summer; Blackpink; Chloe x Halle; CNCO; Little Mix; Monsta X; Now United; The 1975; Twenty One Pilots | |
| 2021 | BTS | Blackpink; CNCO; Foo Fighters; Jonas Brothers; Maroon 5; Silk Sonic; Twenty One Pilots | |
| 2022 | BTS | Blackpink; City Girls; Foo Fighters; Imagine Dragons; Måneskin; Red Hot Chili Peppers; Silk Sonic | |
| 2023 | Blackpink | Fifty Fifty; Flo; Jonas Brothers; Måneskin; NewJeans; Seventeen; Tomorrow X Together | |
| 2024 | Seventeen | Coldplay; Imagine Dragons; NCT Dream; NewJeans; *NSYNC; Tomorrow X Together; Twenty One Pilots | |
| 2025 | Blackpink | Aespa; All Time Low; Backstreet Boys; Coldplay; Evanescence; Fuerza Regida; Grupo Frontera; Imagine Dragons; Jonas Brothers; Katseye; My Chemical Romance; Seventeen; Stray Kids; The Marías; Twenty One Pilots | |
| 2026 | BTS | Blackpink; Cortis; Flo; Fuerza Regida; Geese; Katseye; Twenty One Pilots | |

== Statistics ==
=== Artists with multiple wins ===
5 wins

- BTS

3 wins

- No Doubt

2 wins

- Blackpink
- TLC

=== Artists with multiple nominations ===
7 nominations

- U2
- Blackpink

5 nominations

- Red Hot Chili Peppers
- *NSYNC
- BTS
- Twenty One Pilots

4 nominations

- Foo Fighters
- Backstreet Boys
- Jonas Brothers

3 nominations

- Eurythmics
- Aerosmith
- R.E.M.
- Green Day
- No Doubt
- Dave Matthews Band
- Destiny's Child
- Maroon 5
- CNCO
- Coldplay
- Imagine Dragons
- Seventeen

2 nominations

- ZZ Top
- Huey Lewis and the News
- Van Halen
- INXS
- The Rolling Stones
- Talking Heads
- En Vogue
- TLC
- Blink-182
- Linkin Park
- Good Charlotte
- Fall Out Boy
- 5 Seconds of Summer
- Silk Sonic
- Måneskin
- NewJeans
- Tomorrow X Together
- Flo
- Fuerza Regida
- Katseye

== See also ==
- MTV Europe Music Award for Best Group
- MTV Video Music Award Japan for Best Group Video
