= Michael Jackson Video Vanguard Award =

Award presented to musicians by MTV

- The 1988 Video Vanguard Award received by Michael Jackson
- Awarded for: Outstanding contributions and influence on music video and popular culture
- Sponsored by: Toyota (2023)
- Country: United States
- Presented by: MTV
- Formerly called: Video Vanguard Award; Lifetime Achievement Award
- First award: 1984
- Most recent winner: Nirvana (2026)
- Website: VMA website

The Michael Jackson Video Vanguard Award (alternatively known as the Video Vanguard Award) is a merit given to musicians and music video directors at the MTV Video Music Awards (VMAs), a ceremony that was established in 1984. It is presented by MTV for "outstanding contributions" and "profound impact" on music videos and popular culture. As one of the ceremony's special categories, the recipients are given a gold-plated trophy rather than the regular silver one.

The Beatles and director Richard Lester were honored with the Video Vanguard Award at the inaugural VMAs for "essentially inventing the music video." David Bowie also received the award at the same ceremony. Two years later, Madonna became the first female recipient. In 1991, the award was renamed after Michael Jackson, who had previously won the 1988 award. In 2023, Toyota sponsored the category through a partnership with Paramount Global, resulting in the award being presented as the Michael Jackson Video Vanguard Award Presented by Toyota.

It was presented as the Lifetime Achievement Award at the 2003 VMAs to Duran Duran, and in 2006 as the Video Vanguard Award to director Hype Williams. Following Jackson's death in 2009, the award returned with his name restored in 2011. According to MTV, his name was attached to the award due to "Jackson's groundbreaking work as a video artist". This naming caused controversy in 2019, after the release of Leaving Neverland, a documentary about alleged child sexual abuse by Jackson. MTV did not explicitly display Jackson's name on the television broadcast of the 2019 ceremony, although MTV's website continued to mention Jackson's name on the award. The year's recipient, Missy Elliott, mentioned Jackson in her speech, as did Nicki Minaj in her 2022 speech. The band Nirvana is the most recent recipient of the award at the 2026 ceremony.

Since its inception, the Video Vanguard Award has been awarded to 39 artists and directors, with most of them being of American or British origin, winners from other countries are Russell Mulcahy (1985, Australian), Zbigniew Rybczyński (1986, Polish), U2 (2001, Irish), Rihanna (2016, Barbadian), Nicki Minaj (2022, Trinidadian), and Shakira (2023, Colombian). Out of all the winners, ten artists have also won the award for Video of the Year, including Peter Gabriel and Justin Timberlake, who both won the two awards in the same night. Some recipients have performed a medley of songs prior to their acceptance speech.

== Recipients ==
Key
*	Indicates Video of the Year winners

Year	Image	Recipient	Nationality	Notes	Ref.
1984		The Beatles	United Kingdom	Presented by the Police members Andy Summers and Stewart Copeland. The Beatles and Richard Lester, director of A Hard Day's Night (1964) and Help! (1965), were honored for "essentially inventing the music video."	
1984		Richard Lester	United States	Presented by the Police members Andy Summers and Stewart Copeland. The Beatles and Richard Lester, director of A Hard Day's Night (1964) and Help! (1965), were honored for "essentially inventing the music video."	
1984		David Bowie	United Kingdom	Presented by Herbie Hancock.	
1985		David Byrne	United Kingdom	Presented by Chrissie Hynde. Byrne was honored for his work with Talking Heads.	
1985	—N/a	Russell Mulcahy	Australia	Presented by John Taylor and Andy Taylor. Mulcahy was the director of The Buggles' "Video Killed the Radio Star", the first video played on MTV.	
1985		Godley & Creme	United Kingdom	Presented by Herbie Hancock.	
1986		Madonna *	United States	Presented by Robert Palmer. Madonna became the first woman to receive the honor. She later won the Video of the Year for "Ray of Light" in 1998.	
1986		Zbigniew Rybczyński	Poland	Presented by Pet Shop Boys.	
1987		Peter Gabriel *	United Kingdom	Presented by Laurie Anderson. Gabriel also won the Video of the Year for "Sledgehammer" on the same night.	
1987		Julien Temple	United Kingdom	Presented by David Bowie.	
1988		Michael Jackson	United States	Presented by Peter Gabriel. Jackson was the first African-American artist to receive the honor.	
1989		George Michael	United Kingdom	Presented by Madonna.	
1990		Janet Jackson	United States	Presented by Magic Johnson. Jackson remains the youngest person to receive the honor at 24 years old.	
1991		Bon Jovi	United States	Presented by Arsenio Hall. The honor was renamed the Michael Jackson Video Vanguard Award.	
1991		Wayne Isham	United States	Presented by Arsenio Hall. The honor was renamed the Michael Jackson Video Vanguard Award.	
1992		Guns N' Roses	United States	Presented by Queen members Brian May and Roger Taylor.	
1993	—N/a				
1994		The Rolling Stones	United Kingdom	Presented by Jann Wenner. Given as the Lifetime Achievement Award.	
1994		Tom Petty	United States	Presented by Billy Corgan.	
1995		R.E.M. *	United States	Presented by Drew Barrymore. R.E.M. previously won the Video of the Year for "Losing My Religion" in 1991.	
1996	—N/a				
1997		LL Cool J	United States	Presented by Mariah Carey. LL Cool J became the first hip-hop rapper to receive the honor.	
1997		Mark Romanek	United States	Presented by Janet Jackson.	
1998		Beastie Boys	United States	Presented by Chuck D.	
1999	—N/a				
2000		Red Hot Chili Peppers	United States	Presented by Chris Rock and Lance Crouther	
2001		U2	Ireland	Presented by Carson Daly.	
2002	—N/a				
2003		Duran Duran	United Kingdom	Presented by Kelly Osbourne and Avril Lavigne. Given as the Lifetime Achievement Award.	
2004	—N/a				
2005	—N/a				
2006	—N/a	Hype Williams	United States	Presented by Kanye West. Given as the Video Vanguard Award.	
2007	—N/a				
2008	—N/a				
2009	—N/a				
2010	—N/a				
2011		Britney Spears *	United States	Presented by Lady Gaga. The award was renamed again to the Michael Jackson Video Vanguard Award. Spears previously won the Video of the Year for "Piece of Me" in 2008.	
2012	—N/a				
2013		Justin Timberlake *	United States	Presented by Jimmy Fallon. Timberlake also won the Video of the Year for "Mirrors" on the same night.	
2014		Beyoncé *	United States	Presented by Jay-Z and Blue Ivy Carter. Beyoncé won the Video of the Year twice, for "Single Ladies" in 2009 and "Formation" in 2016.	
2015		Kanye West	United States	Presented by Taylor Swift.	
2016		Rihanna *	Barbados	Presented by Drake. Rihanna previously won the Video of the Year twice, for "Umbrella" in 2007 and "We Found Love" in 2012.	
2017		P!nk *	United States	Presented by Ellen DeGeneres. P!nk previously won the Video of the Year for "Lady Marmalade" in 2001.	
2018		Jennifer Lopez	United States	Presented by Shawn Mendes. Lopez became the first ethnic Latin artist to receive the honor. Lopez was later the recipient of the MTV Generation Award at the 2022 MTV Movie & TV Awards, becoming the first entertainer to receive both honors from MTV.	
2019		Missy Elliott *	United States	Presented by Cardi B. Elliott previously won the Video of the Year twice, for "Lady Marmalade" in 2001 and "Work It" in 2003. She became the first female rapper to receive the honor.	
2020	—N/a				
2021	—N/a				
2022		Nicki Minaj	Trinidad and Tobago	Presented by members of her fan club "The Barbz".	
2023		Shakira	Colombia	Presented by Wyclef Jean. Shakira is the first South American artist to receive the honor.	
2024		Katy Perry *	United States	Presented by Orlando Bloom. Perry previously won the Video of the Year for "Firework" in 2011.	
2025		Mariah Carey	United States	Presented by Ariana Grande. At 56 years old, Carey is the oldest person to receive the honor.	
2026		Nirvana	United States	Presented by Chuck D.	

== See also ==
- Billboard Icon Award
- Brit Award for Outstanding Contribution to Music
- Grammy Lifetime Achievement Award
