= 1988 MTV Video Music Awards =

1988 award ceremony

- Date: September 7, 1988
- Location: Universal Amphitheatre, Los Angeles
- Country: United States
- Hosted by: Arsenio Hall
- Most awards: INXS (5)
- Most nominations: INXS (9)

Television/radio coverage
- Network: MTV
- Produced by: Dick Clark; Tom Freston
- Directed by: Bruce Gowers

The 1988 MTV Video Music Awards aired live on September 7, 1988, from the Universal Amphitheatre in Los Angeles. Hosted by Arsenio Hall, the show honored the best music videos released between May 2, 1987, and April 1, 1988.

Australian rock band INXS was both the most-nominated and most-awarded artist at the show, winning five of their nine nominations, including the awards for Video of the Year and Viewer's Choice for "Need You Tonight/Mediate". This marked the first of a few instances in VMA history where the same artist and music video won both awards at the same ceremony. Other artists with multiple nominations included George Harrison and U2, who earned eight each.

The category for Best Overall Performance in a Video was eliminated from the award lineup while the category for Most Experimental Video was renamed to "Breakthrough Video", a name it would keep until the 2010 MTV Video Music Awards, after which it was also removed from the lineup.

== Background ==
Nominees were revealed on July 12, 1988. Dick Clark was announced as the show's producer on August 1 while Arsenio Hall was named a co-host—no other co-host was subsequently announced. Clark's hiring was rooted in MTV's desire to streamline the ceremony by bringing in a producer with experience in music and award ceremony broadcasting. On show-day, the live broadcast was preceded by the 1988 MTV Video Music Awards Pre-Game Show, during which Ken Ober and Colin Quinn highlighted the nominated videos.

== Performances ==
List of musical performances
Artist(s)	Song(s)	Ref.
Rod Stewart	"Forever Young"	
Jody Watley	"Some Kind of Lover"	
Aerosmith	"Dude (Looks Like a Lady)"	
Elton John	"I Don't Wanna Go on with You Like That" (live from Miami)	
Depeche Mode	"Strangelove"	
Crowded House	"Better Be Home Soon"	
Michael Jackson	"Bad" (live from Würzburg)	
Cher	"Main Man"	
The Fat Boys; Chubby Checker	"Louie Louie" "The Twist"	
Guns N' Roses	"Welcome to the Jungle"	
INXS	"New Sensation"	

== Presenters ==
- David Coverdale and Tawny Kitaen – presented Best Group Video
- Eric Roberts and Teri Garr – presented Best Video from a Film
- Bryan Ferry and Melanie Griffith – presented Breakthrough Video
- Crowded House – presented Best New Artist in a Video
- Elvira, Mistress of the Dark, and Magic Johnson – presented Best Concept Video
- DJ Jazzy Jeff & The Fresh Prince and Justine Bateman – presented Best Stage Performance in a Video
- Peter Gabriel – presented the Video Vanguard award to Michael Jackson during his acceptance segment in London
- Adam Curry and Kevin Seal – announced the winners for Best Special Effects, Best Art Direction, Best Editing, and Best Cinematography in a Video
- Suzanne Vega and Robert Downey Jr. – presented Best Direction in a Video
- Julie Brown and Downtown Julie Brown – presented Best Choreography in a Video; also appeared in pre-commercial segments about what was 'coming up' on the show
- The Bangles – presented Best Male Video
- Cyndi Lauper and Rod Stewart – presented Viewer's Choice
- Aerosmith – presented Best Female Video
- Cher and Hall – presented Video of the Year

== Winners and nominees ==
Nominees were selected from "a list of 644 videos that were exhibited for the first time on MTV between May 2, 1987, and April 1, 1988." Two rounds of voting were used to first select ten semifinalists followed by five finalists in each category. Winners were selected in the third round of voting. The selection of semifinalists was open to "record company executives, record and video retailers, radio station program directors, the press, attorneys, agents, and artists," while the selection of finalists was open to the 1,800 members of MTV's Video Music Awards (VMA) voting body. Winners were selected by the VMA voting body (general categories), members of the music video industry (professional categories), or MTV viewers (Viewer's Choice and Hall of Fame).

Winners are listed first and highlighted in bold.

Video of the Year	Best Male Video
**INXS – "Need You Tonight/Mediate"**; George Harrison – "When We Was Fab"; Bruce Springsteen – "Tunnel of Love"; U2 – "I Still Haven't Found What I'm Looking For"; U2 – "Where the Streets Have No Name"	**Prince – "U Got the Look"**; Terence Trent D'Arby – "Wishing Well"; George Harrison – "Got My Mind Set on You"; Bruce Springsteen – "Tunnel of Love"; Steve Winwood – "Back in the High Life Again"
Best Female Video	Best Group Video
**Suzanne Vega – "Luka"**; Cher – "I Found Someone"; Lita Ford – "Kiss Me Deadly"; Janet Jackson – "The Pleasure Principle"; Jody Watley – "Some Kind of Lover"	**INXS – "Need You Tonight/Mediate"**; Aerosmith – "Dude (Looks Like a Lady)"; Eurythmics – "I Need a Man"; U2 – "I Still Haven't Found What I'm Looking For"; U2 – "Where the Streets Have No Name"
Best New Artist in a Video	Best Concept Video
**Guns N' Roses – "Welcome to the Jungle"**; The Godfathers – "Birth, School, Work, Death"; Buster Poindexter – "Hot, Hot, Hot"; Swing Out Sister – "Breakout"; Jody Watley – "Some Kind of Lover"	**Pink Floyd – "Learning to Fly"**; George Harrison – "When We Was Fab"; INXS – "Need You Tonight/Mediate"; U2 – "I Still Haven't Found What I'm Looking For"; XTC – "Dear God"
Best Video from a Film	Breakthrough Video
**Los Lobos – "La Bamba" (from La Bamba)**; The Bangles – "Hazy Shade of Winter" (from Less than Zero); Bryan Ferry – "Kiss and Tell" (from Bright Lights, Big City); Peter Gabriel – "Biko" (from Cry Freedom); Bob Seger – "Shakedown" (from Beverly Hills Cop II)	**INXS – "Need You Tonight/Mediate"**; George Harrison – "When We Was Fab"; Squeeze – "Hourglass"; Suzanne Vega – "Luka"; XTC – "Dear God"
Best Stage Performance in a Video	Best Direction in a Video
**Prince – "U Got the Look"**; Aerosmith – "Dude (Looks Like a Lady)"; Grateful Dead – "Touch of Grey"; Elton John – "Candle in the Wind (live)"; Roy Orbison – "Oh, Pretty Woman (live)"; U2 – "Where the Streets Have No Name"	**George Michael – "Father Figure" (Directors: Andy Morahan and George Michael)**; Eurythmics – "You Have Placed a Chill in My Heart" (Director: Sophie Muller); Pink Floyd – "Learning to Fly" (Director: Storm Thorgerson); R.E.M. – "The One I Love" (Director: Robert Longo); XTC – "Dear God" (Director: Nicholas Brandt)
Best Choreography in a Video	Best Special Effects in a Video
**Janet Jackson – "The Pleasure Principle" (Choreographer: Barry Lather)**; Michael Jackson – "Bad" (Choreographers: Michael Jackson, Gregg Burge and Jeffrey Daniel); Michael Jackson – "The Way You Make Me Feel" (Choreographers: Michael Jackson and Vincent Paterson); Prince – "U Got the Look" (Choreographer: Cat Glover); Sting – "We'll Be Together" (Choreographer: Barry Lather)	**Squeeze – "Hourglass" (Special Effects: Jim Francis and Dave Barton)**; Grateful Dead – "Touch of Grey" (Special Effects: Gary Gutierrez); George Harrison – "Got My Mind Set on You" (Special Effects: John McCallum); George Harrison – "When We Was Fab" (Special Effects: Chris Lyons); INXS – "Need You Tonight/Mediate" (Special Effects: Lynn Maree Milburn)
Best Art Direction in a Video	Best Editing in a Video
**Squeeze – "Hourglass" (Art Directors: Clive Crotty and Mick Edwards)**; George Harrison – "When We Was Fab" (Art Director: Sid Bartholomew); INXS – "Need You Tonight/Mediate" (Art Director: Lynn Maree Milburn); George Michael – "Faith" (Art Director: Bryan Jones); Bruce Springsteen – "Tunnel of Love" (Art Directors: Howard Cummings and Beth Rubino)	**INXS – "Need You Tonight/Mediate" (Editor: Richard Lowenstein)**; INXS – "Devil Inside" (Editor: Steve Purcell); Loverboy – "Notorious" (Editor: Jim Haygood); Prince – "U Got the Look" (Editor: Charley Randazzo and Steve Purcell); Bruce Springsteen – "Tunnel of Love" (Editor: Greg Dougherty)
Best Cinematography in a Video	Viewer's Choice
**Sting – "We'll Be Together" (Director of Photography: Bill Pope)**; George Michael – "Father Figure" (Director of Photography: Peter Mackay); Pink Floyd – "Learning to Fly" (Director of Photography: Gordon Minard); Robert Plant – "Heaven Knows" (Director of Photography: Steve Tickner); Suzanne Vega – "Luka" (Director of Photography: Dariusz Wolski)	**INXS – "Need You Tonight/Mediate"**; George Harrison – "When We Was Fab"; Bruce Springsteen – "Tunnel of Love"; U2 – "I Still Haven't Found What I'm Looking For"; U2 – "Where the Streets Have No Name"
Video Vanguard Award
**Michael Jackson**

== Artists with multiple wins and nominations ==
Artists who received multiple awards
Wins	Artist
5	INXS
2	Prince
2	Squeeze

Artists who received multiple nominations
Nominations	Artist
9	INXS
8	George Harrison
8	U2
5	Bruce Springsteen
4	Prince
3	George Michael
3	Pink Floyd
3	Squeeze
3	Suzanne Vega
3	XTC
2	Aerosmith
2	Eurythmics
2	Grateful Dead
2	Janet Jackson
2	Jody Watley
2	Michael Jackson
2	Sting

== Music Videos with multiple wins and nominations ==
Music Videos that received multiple awards
Wins	Artist	Music Video
5	INXS	"Need You Tonight/Mediate"
2	Prince	"U Got the Look"
2	Squeeze	"Hourglass"

Music Videos that received multiple nominations
Nominations	Artist	Music Video
8	INXS	"Need You Tonight/Mediate"
6	George Harrison	"When We Was Fab"
5	Bruce Springsteen	"Tunnel of Love"
4	Prince	"U Got the Look"
4	U2	"I Still Haven't Found What I'm Looking For"
4	U2	"Where the Streets Have No Name"
3	Pink Floyd	"Learning to Fly"
3	Squeeze	"Hourglass"
3	Suzanne Vega	"Luka"
3	XTC	"Dear God"
2	Aerosmith	"Dude (Looks Like a Lady)"
2	George Harrison	"Got My Mind Set on You"
2	George Michael	"Father Figure"
2	Grateful Dead	"Touch of Grey"
2	Janet Jackson	"The Pleasure Principle"
2	Jody Watley	"Some Kind of Lover"
2	Sting	"We'll Be Together"

== Other appearances ==
- Jim Turner (as "Randee of the Redwoods") and Kevin Seal – appeared in pre-commercial vignettes about Viewer's Choice voting procedures
- Ken Ober – appeared in a couple of pre-commercial segments telling viewers what was 'coming up' on the show
- Paul Reiser – performed a brief stand-up routine and introduced Jody Watley
- Bobby McFerrin – sang the eligibility and voting rules for the 1988 VMAs
- Jim Turner (as "Randee of the Redwoods") – appeared in a pre-commercial segment telling viewers what was 'coming up' on the show
- Adam Curry and Kevin Seal – introduced the winners of the professional categories; also appeared in pre-commercial segments about what was 'coming up' on the show
- Sam Kinison – performed a stand-up routine and introduced Guns N' Roses
- Penn & Teller – performed a magic routine
