= True Stories (film) =

1986 film directed by David Byrne

- Theatrical release poster
- Directed by: David Byrne
- Written by: Stephen Tobolowsky; Beth Henley; David Byrne
- Produced by: Gary Kurfirst
- Starring: John Goodman; Annie McEnroe; Swoosie Kurtz; Spalding Gray; Pops Staples; Tito Larriva; David Byrne
- Cinematography: Ed Lachman
- Edited by: Caroline Biggerstaff
- Music by: Talking Heads
- Production company: True Stories Venture
- Distributed by: Warner Bros. Pictures
- Release date: October 10, 1986
- Running time: 90 minutes
- Country: United States
- Language: English
- Box office: $2.5 million

True Stories (full onscreen title: True Stories: A Film About a Bunch of People in Virgil Texas.) is a 1986 American satirical musical comedy film co-written and directed by David Byrne, who stars alongside John Goodman, Swoosie Kurtz, and Spalding Gray. The majority of the film's music is supplied by Byrne’s band Talking Heads. A soundtrack album, titled Sounds from True Stories, featured songs by Byrne, Talking Heads, Terry Allen & the Panhandle Mystery Band, and others. Around the same time, Talking Heads released an album titled True Stories, composed of studio recordings of songs featured in the film.

True Stories was released by Warner Bros. Pictures in the United States, Canada, Italy, and Sweden in 1986, and received a limited release elsewhere the following year. Byrne was given much creative control over the motion picture's direction, largely due to the mainstream success of Talking Heads' 1984 concert film Stop Making Sense. The resulting film is replete with Byrne's eccentric and idiosyncratic observations of small-town life, exaggerated satirical imagery, and surrealist sense of humor.

== Plot ==
The film is presented as a series of vignettes centered around Byrne as an unnamed, cowboy-hat-wearing stranger who visits the fictional Texas town of Virgil, where he observes the citizens as they prepare for the "Celebration of Specialness" to mark the 150th anniversary of Texas' independence. The event is being sponsored by the Varicorp Corporation, a local computer manufacturing plant. Among the many characters the visitor meets and interacts with, the most prominent are:

- Louis Fyne, a country-western-singing clean room technician at Varicorp who is unlucky in love
- Civic leader Earl Culver, who never speaks directly to his wife, Kay
- Miss Rollings, who never leaves her bed
- Mr. Tucker, Miss Rollings' personal assistant, a kindly voodoo practitioner whom Louis hires to help him find love
- A conspiracy theorist preacher, whose shtick owes a great deal to the Church of the SubGenius
- Ramon, a Tejano singer who claims to hear tones from people
- "The Lying Woman", who recounts fantastic episodes from her life to anyone who will listen

The film takes the viewer throughout many different parts of the towns preparations, such as a fashion show, sermon and an introduction to VariCorp. The film also has sections in which music is played, sometimes sung by Actors, sometimes by members of Talking Heads with Actors lip syncing. The music was released by Talking Heads as the album True Stories, and a cast recording was released later, and incidental music released as Sounds from True Stories.

== Cast ==
- David Byrne as The Narrator (also as the Lip-Syncher with mustache during the "Wild Wild Life" sequence)
- John Goodman as Louis Fyne
- Spalding Gray as Earl Culver
- Annie McEnroe as Kay Culver
- Swoosie Kurtz as Miss Rollings, The Lazy Woman
- Pops Staples as Mr. Tucker
- John Ingle as The Preacher
- Tito Larriva as Ramon
- Jo Harvey Allen as The Lying Woman
- Chris Frantz, Tina Weymouth and Jerry Harrison as Lip-Synchers ("Wild Wild Life" sequence).

== Production ==
Byrne has stated that the decision to film in Texas was motivated in large part by investors in the project, due to anti-union right-to-work laws in the state, telling the Miami Herald in 1986: "I first was lured there for financial reasons because it's a right-to-work state, and they have experienced crews and a studio near Dallas."

Stephen Tobolowsky recounts in an episode of his podcast The Tobolowsky Files that he and his girlfriend Beth Henley met David Byrne and Talking Heads when Jonathan Demme invited them to a preview screening of Stop Making Sense. Shortly afterward, Byrne invited Henley and Tobolowsky over to his house and showed them a collection of hundreds of drawings he had made and put up on his wall. He explained they were based on clippings he had scrapbooked from tabloids as the band had been on tour. He had been intrigued by the idea of making a film based on the premise, "What if all these stories were true?" and wanted Henley and Tobolowsky to write the script based on those drawings.

Tobolowsky was aware that Texas was coming up on its sesquicentennial celebration, and thought that would provide a good framework for the characters Byrne had invented. Henley and he wrote a draft and provided it to Byrne, then did not hear back from him for about a year. It later turned out that Byrne had rewritten their script almost entirely, keeping only a few lines and the sesquicentennial framework from the first draft. However, he asked Tobolowsky and Henley for permission to list their names ahead of his as scriptwriters so the film would seem less like a "vanity project".

During Tobolowsky's early talks with Byrne, he related to Byrne the story of a series of psychic experiences he had during college, in which he had been able to hear "tones" that told him things about other people. Byrne incorporated this story into his rewrite, using it as the basis for Ramon's psychic powers and the song "Radio Head".

Filming took place in Dallas and its suburbs Allen, McKinney, Mesquite, Midlothian and Red Oak. The interior mall and fashion show scene was filmed in NorthPark Center in North Dallas, and the exterior mall scene was filmed at the now-demolished Big Town Mall in Mesquite. The parade scene at the end of the film includes various local groups, including the Tejas Low Riders Club and the Sunset High School Marching Band.

== Reception ==
True Stories was not a commercial success at the time of its release. On Rotten Tomatoes, the film has an approval rating of 78%, based on 27 reviews. The critical consensus reads: "Its kitschy leanings may wear thin on some, but True Stories is a disarmingly big-hearted, dreamy vision of Americana." Metacritic, which uses a weighted average, assigned the film a score of 67 out of 100, based on 10 critics, indicating "generally favorable" reviews. Roger Ebert gave it a glowing review with a rating of 3.5/4 stars. It has achieved success in home video release as a cult classic among fans of Byrne's work.

Colin Greenland reviewed True Stories for White Dwarf #85, and stated that "True Stories is a tour of Virgil, Texas, Byrne's toytown utopia, whose peculiar citizens have neurosis down to a fine art. Zippy the Pinhead would be at home in Virgil."

=== Home media ===
In 1987, the film was released on VHS and Laserdisc. On March 30, 1999, it was released onto DVD. On November 27, 2018, The Criterion Collection released a DVD and Blu-ray of the film.

== Music ==
True Stories features a number of songs written by Byrne and performed by various members of the cast as well as by Talking Heads (the members of which make cameo appearances).

Talking Heads released an album titled True Stories in which the band performs most of the songs from the film, including songs that were performed by the actors in the film. As such, the album is not generally considered a true soundtrack album, a fact Byrne points out in his liner notes on the release. Later, Byrne released an album containing primarily instrumental music from the soundtrack titled Sounds from True Stories.

While several of the cast performances were released as bonus tracks on 12-inch single releases, no full album of cast performances was released until 2018 (see below). Prior to 2018, few of the original versions of songs from the film found official release. The St. Thomas Aquinas School Choir's version of "Hey Now" was released on the 1987 Talking Heads UK CD single, "Radio Head"; the Pops Staples version of "Papa Legba" and Tito Larriva's version of "Radio Head" appear as extra tracks on the 2006 Rhino reissue of True Stories; and John Goodman's version of "People Like Us" was initially released as the B-side to the single for "Wild Wild Life" and later was released on the 2006 digital compilation Bonus Rarities and Outtakes, but the rest of the songs whose versions differ between the movie and album (John Ingle's "Puzzling Evidence" and Annie McEnroe's "Dream Operator") were not officially available. "Cocktail Desperado", recorded by Terry Allen and the Panhandle Mystery Band and featured in the film, is included on the Sounds from True Stories LP.

The music video version of "Wild Wild Life" that debuted on MTV is largely a scene taken from the film, in which many of the film's characters (including John Goodman) lip-synch to the music in a night club; the video version is more risque and features more pop music references/parodies than seen in the film; the Prince and Billy Idol parodies remain in the film version. Similarly, the video for "Love for Sale" is the same as that seen in the film (in which Kurtz's character is shown watching it on TV) except the video version has additional footage of Talking Heads, more references to recognizable TV commercials of the day, and no intercuts to any of the film characters.

In November 2018, True Stories, A Film by David Byrne: The Complete Soundtrack, a comprehensive soundtrack album with 23 songs as they were recorded for the film, was released. This marked the first time that the complete True Stories soundtrack was made publicly available, 32 years after the movie's original release. The soundtrack was issued to coincide with Criterion's 2018 DVD and Blu-ray release of the film, the latter of which it was also packaged with. The new-edition soundtrack includes the three Talking Heads performances with David Byrne on lead vocals that are featured in the movie: "Wild Wild Life," "Love for Sale," and "City of Dreams", which are the same recordings included on the Talking Heads album True Stories; otherwise, the material does not overlap with the Talking Heads album. The new edition includes the first official commercial release of McEnroe's "Dream Operator" and Ingle's "Puzzlin' Evidence".

== Legacy ==
English rock band Radiohead is named after the song "Radio Head" from True Stories.
