= MTV Video Music Award for Video of the Year =

Annual music video award

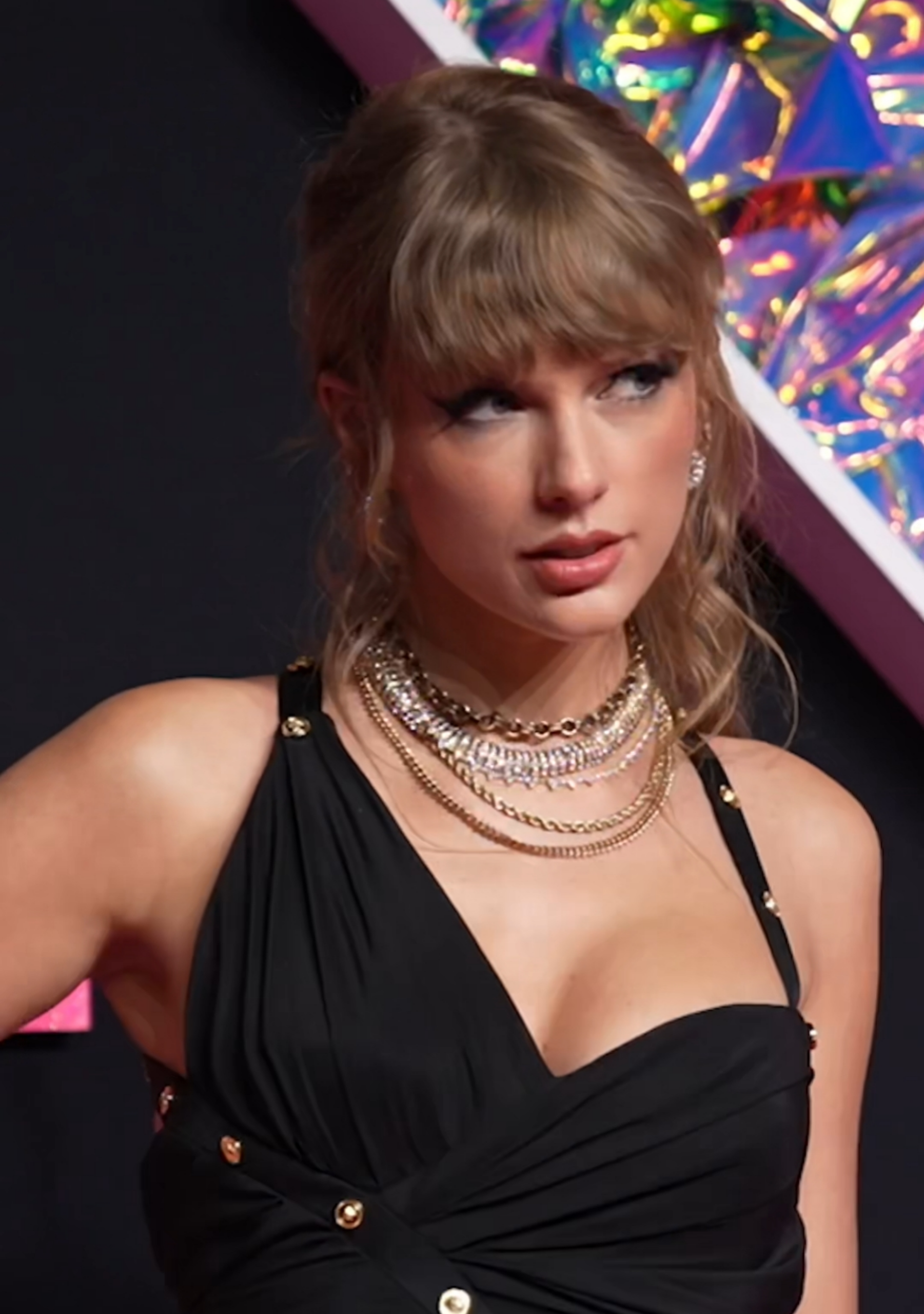
- Taylor Swift is the most awarded artist in this category, with a total of six wins. She is the most recent recipient for "The Fate of Ophelia."
- Awarded for: Music videos
- Country: United States
- Presented by: MTV
- First award: 1984
- Currently held by: Taylor Swift – The Fate of Ophelia (2026)

Highlights
- Most wins: Taylor Swift (6)
- Most nominations: Eminem (9)
- Website: Official website

The MTV Video Music Award for Video of the Year is the most prestigious competitive award and the final award presented at the annual MTV Video Music Awards. The award was created by the U.S. network MTV to honor artists with the best music videos. At the first MTV Video Music Awards ceremony in 1984, the Video of the Year honor was presented to The Cars for the video "You Might Think". Originally, all winners were determined by a special panel of music video directors, producers, and record company executives. Since the 2006 awards, winners of major categories are determined by viewers' votes through MTV's website, while the jury decides in the technical categories. From 2021 to 2025, Burger King sponsors the category through a partnership with Paramount, resulting in the award being presented as MTV Video Music Award for Video of the Year Presented by Burger King.

Taylor Swift holds the record for the most wins, with a total of six for "Bad Blood" (2015), "You Need to Calm Down" (2019), All Too Well: The Short Film (2022), "Anti-Hero" (2023), "Fortnight" (2024), and "The Fate of Ophelia" (2026). Eminem holds the record for the most nominations, with nine as lead artist. (Note: Eminem has one more nomination as part of the collective D12.) Among female artists, Swift has received the most nominations, with eight. David Lee Roth (1985), U2 (1988), Lady Gaga (2010) and Bruno Mars (2025) are the only acts to have had two Video of the Year nominations in a single ceremony. Two acts have won both the Video of the Year and the honorary Michael Jackson Video Vanguard Award in the same night—Peter Gabriel in 1987 with "Sledgehammer" and Justin Timberlake in 2013 with "Mirrors". Swift is the first artist to win Video of the Year for a self-directed video, with All Too Well: The Short Film; she also ranks as the artist with the most Video of the Year trophies for self-directed videos, with a total of four. Kendrick Lamar, Swift, Lil Nas X, and Ariana Grande have further won the award for a video they co-directed: Lamar for "Humble" in 2017, Swift for "You Need to Calm Down" in 2019, Lil Nas X for "Montero (Call Me By Your Name)" in 2021, and Grande for Brighter Days Ahead in 2025. (Note: Kendrick Lamar co-directed "Humble" as part of the Little Homies.)

== Recipients ==
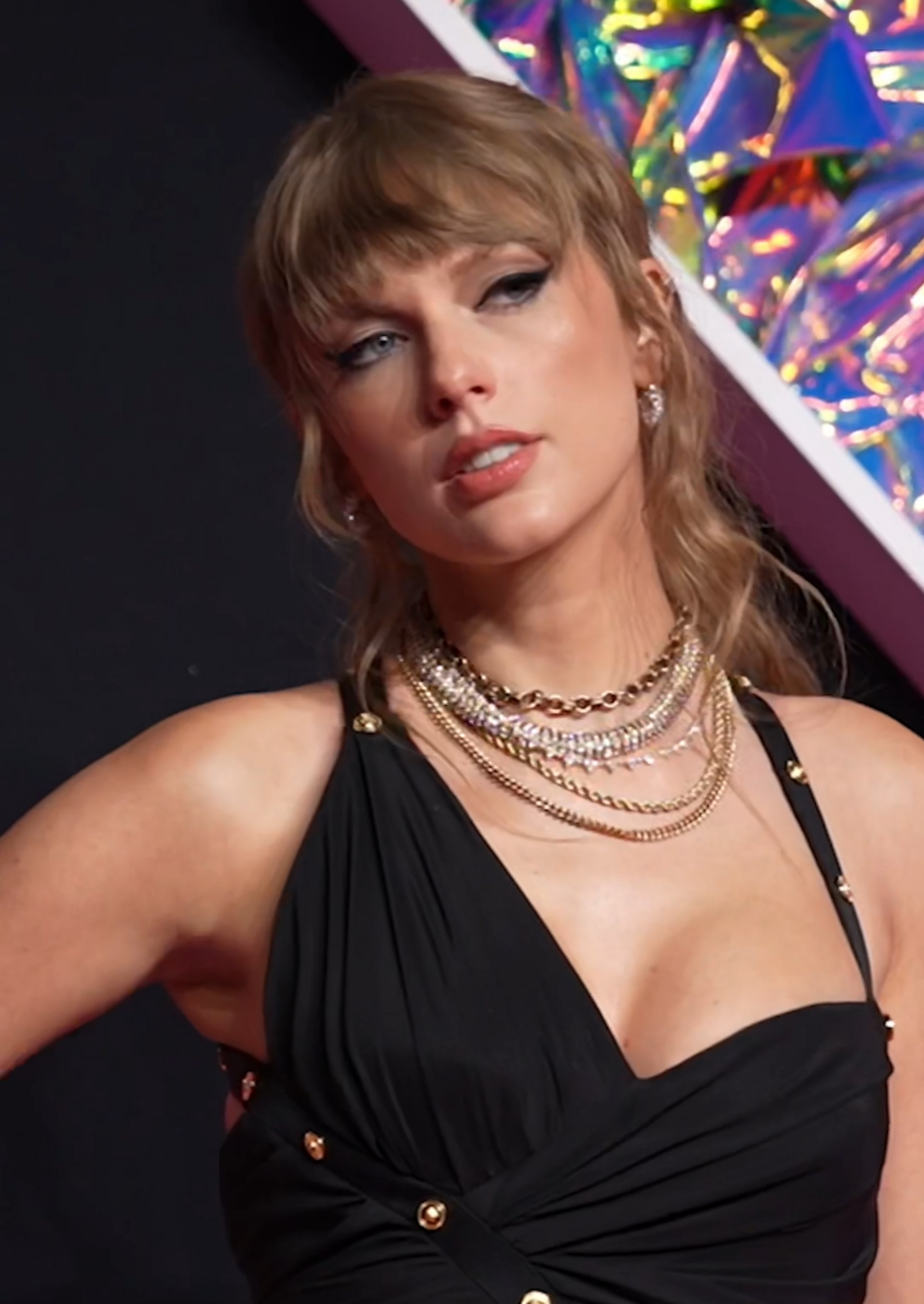
Taylor Swift is the category's most awarded artist, winning six times: "Bad Blood" (2015), "You Need to Calm Down" (2019), All Too Well: The Short Film (2022), "Anti-Hero" (2023), "Fortnight" (2024), and "The Fate of Ophelia" (2026).

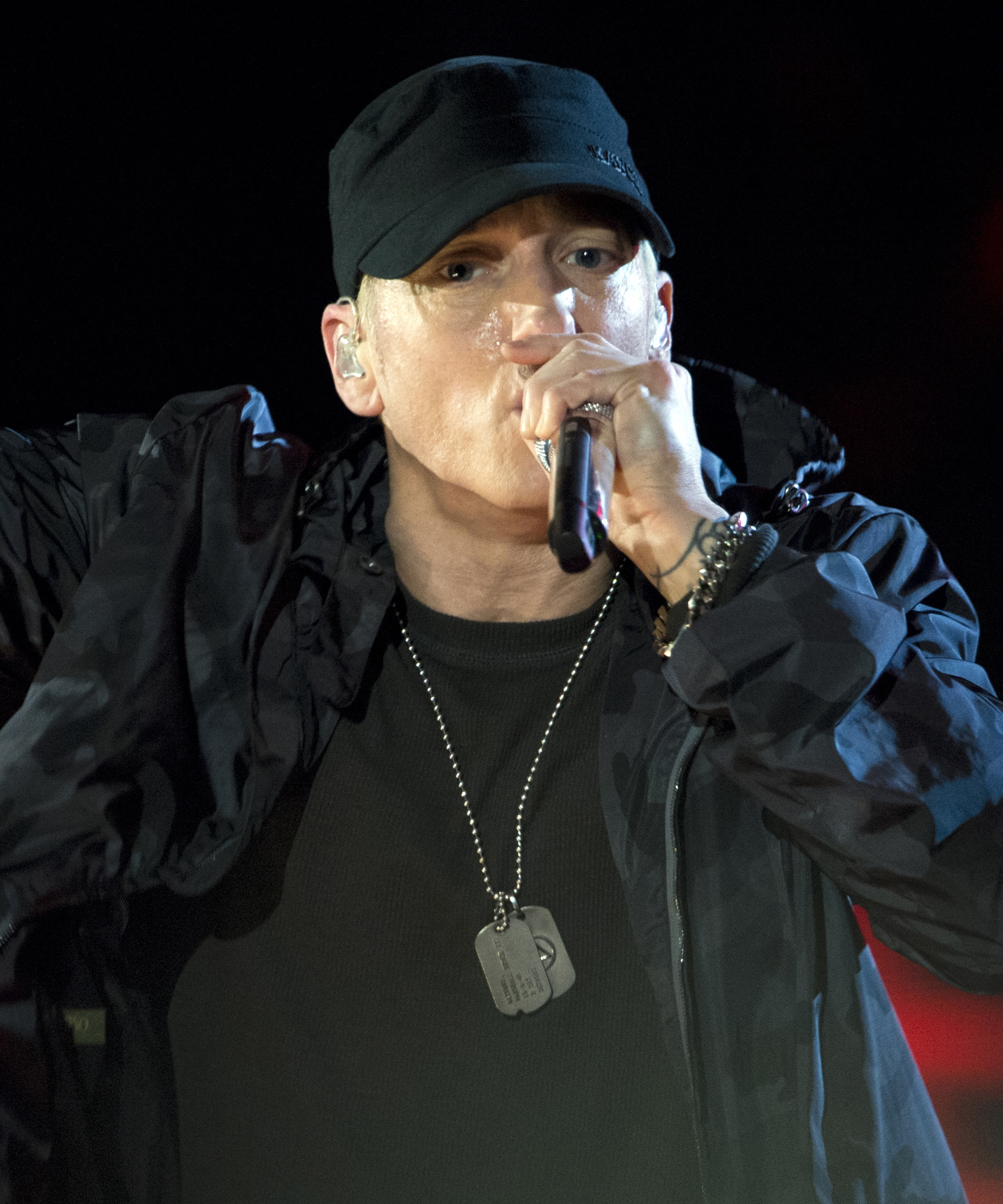
The first artist to win Video of the Year twice is Eminem, in 2000 for "The Real Slim Shady" and in 2002 for "Without Me".

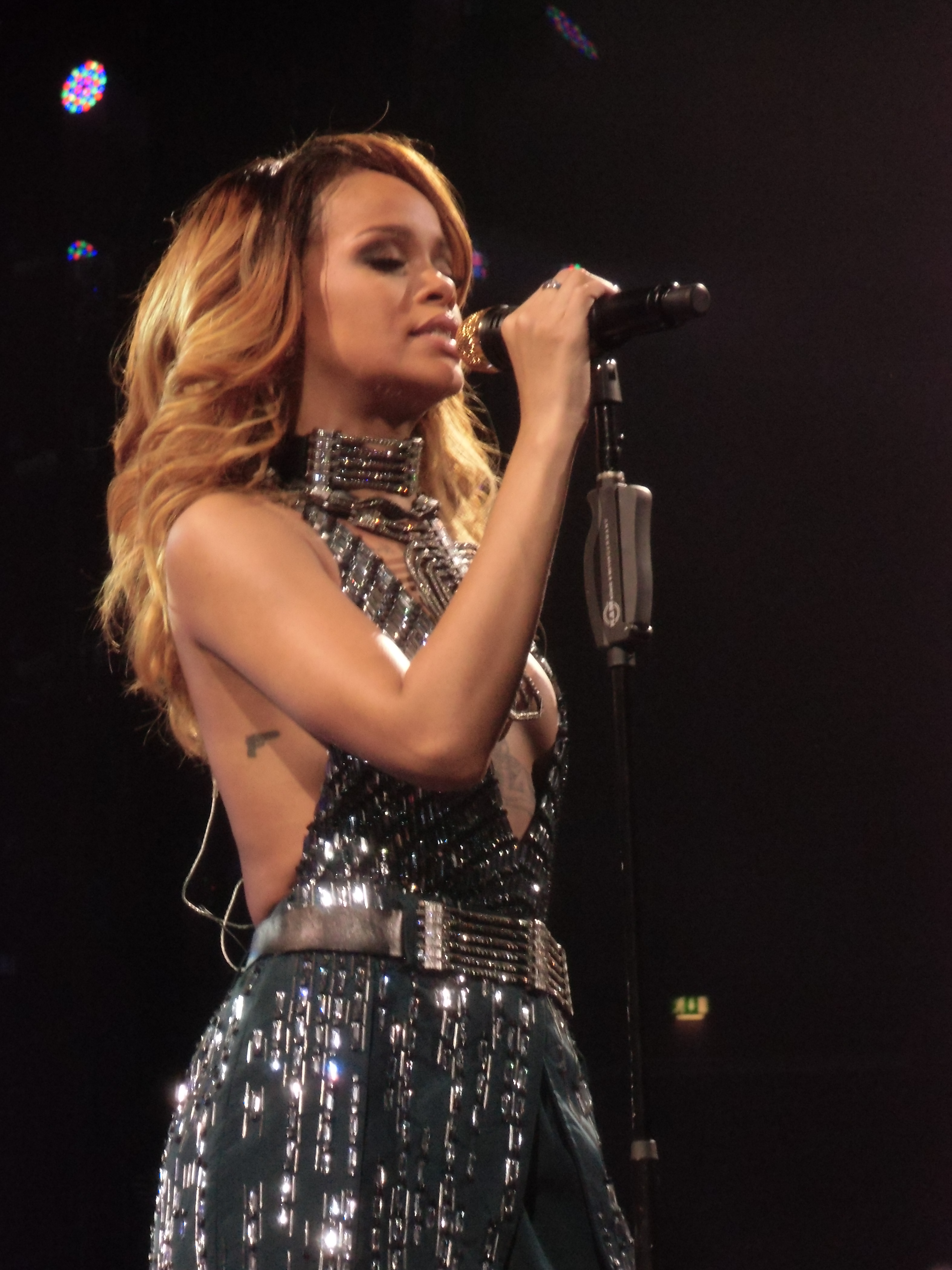
Rihanna became the first woman to win the award twice as a lead artist, in 2007 for "Umbrella", and 2012 for "We Found Love".

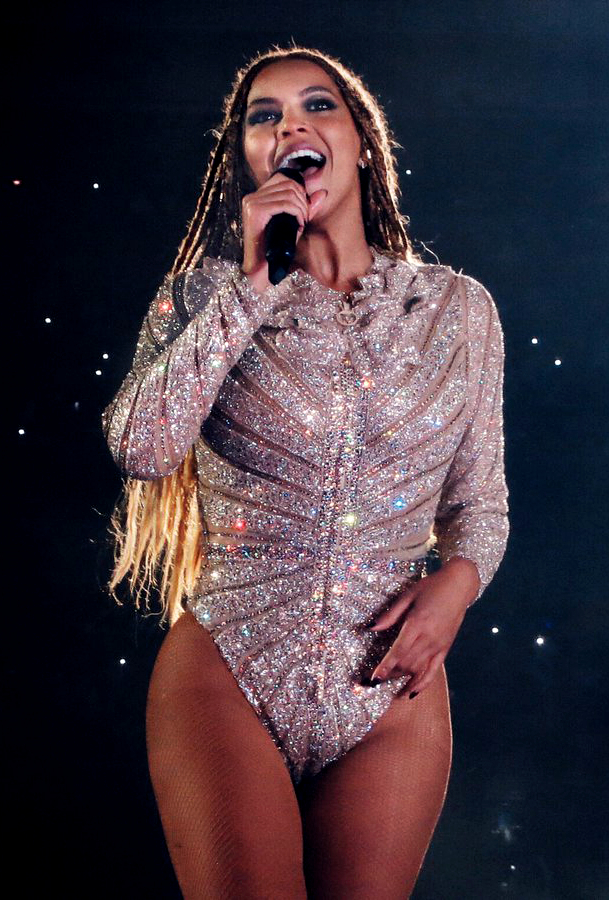
Two-time winner Beyoncé, did so with "Single Ladies (Put a Ring on It)" in 2009 and "Formation" in 2016.

Key
†	Marks winners of the Grammy Award for Best Music Video
*	Marks nominees of the Grammy Award for Best Music Video

Recipients
Year (Note: Each year is linked to the article about the MTV Video Music Awards held that year.)	Winner(s)	Video	Nominees	Ref.
1984	The Cars	"You Might Think"	"Rockit" – Herbie Hancock; "Thriller" – Michael Jackson; "Girls Just Want to Have Fun" – Cyndi Lauper; "Every Breath You Take" – The Police	
1985	Don Henley	"The Boys of Summer"	"Don't Come Around Here No More" – Tom Petty and the Heartbreakers; "California Girls" – David Lee Roth; "Just a Gigolo" / "I Ain't Got Nobody" – David Lee Roth; "We Are the World" – USA for Africa†	
1986	Dire Straits	"Money for Nothing"	"Take On Me" – a-ha; "Cry" – Godley & Creme; "Addicted to Love" – Robert Palmer; "Road to Nowhere" – Talking Heads	
1987	Peter Gabriel	"Sledgehammer"	"Land of Confusion" – Genesis; "The Boy in the Bubble" – Paul Simon; "With or Without You" – U2; "Higher Love" – Steve Winwood	
1988	INXS	"Need You Tonight" / "Mediate"	"When We Was Fab" – George Harrison; "Tunnel of Love" – Bruce Springsteen; "I Still Haven't Found What I'm Looking For" – U2; "Where the Streets Have No Name" – U2	
1989	Neil Young	"This Note's for You"	"She Drives Me Crazy" – Fine Young Cannibals; "Leave Me Alone" – Michael Jackson†; "Like a Prayer" – Madonna; "Roll with It" – Steve Winwood	
1990	Sinéad O'Connor*	"Nothing Compares 2 U"*	"Janie's Got a Gun" – Aerosmith; "The End of the Innocence" – Don Henley; "Vogue" – Madonna	
1991	R.E.M.†	"Losing My Religion"†	"Gonna Make You Sweat (Everybody Dance Now)" – C+C Music Factory; "Groove Is in the Heart" – Deee-Lite; "I Touch Myself" – Divinyls; "Wicked Game" – Chris Isaak; "Silent Lucidity" – Queensrÿche	
1992	Van Halen	"Right Now"	"Let's Get Rocked" – Def Leppard; "Smells Like Teen Spirit" – Nirvana; "Under the Bridge" – Red Hot Chili Peppers	
1993	Pearl Jam	"Jeremy"	"Livin' on the Edge" – Aerosmith; "Free Your Mind" – En Vogue*; "Digging in the Dirt" – Peter Gabriel†; "Man on the Moon" – R.E.M.	
1994	Aerosmith	"Cryin'"	"Sabotage" – Beastie Boys; "Heart-Shaped Box" – Nirvana; "Everybody Hurts" – R.E.M.*	
1995	TLC	"Waterfalls"	"Basket Case" – Green Day; "Scream" – Michael Jackson and Janet Jackson†; "Buddy Holly" – Weezer	
1996	The Smashing Pumpkins*	"Tonight, Tonight"*	"Tha Crossroads" – Bone Thugs-n-Harmony; "Big Me" – Foo Fighters; "Ironic" – Alanis Morissette*	
1997	Jamiroquai	"Virtual Insanity"	"The New Pollution" – Beck; "You Were Meant for Me" – Jewel; "The Perfect Drug" – Nine Inch Nails; "Don't Speak" – No Doubt	
1998	Madonna†	"Ray of Light"†	"The Boy is Mine" – Brandy and Monica; "It's All About the Benjamins" (Rock Remix) – Puff Daddy (featuring the LOX, Lil' Kim, The Notorious B.I.G. and Fuzzbubble); "Gettin' Jiggy wit It" – Will Smith; "Bitter Sweet Symphony" – The Verve	
1999	Lauryn Hill	"Doo Wop (That Thing)"	"I Want It That Way" – Backstreet Boys; "Freak on a Leash" – Korn†; "Livin' la Vida Loca" – Ricky Martin; "Wild Wild West" – Will Smith (featuring Dru Hill and Kool Moe Dee)	
2000	Eminem	"The Real Slim Shady"	"All the Small Things" – Blink-182; "Untitled (How Does It Feel)" – D'Angelo; "Bye Bye Bye" – NSYNC; "Californication" – Red Hot Chili Peppers	
2001	Christina Aguilera, Lil' Kim, Mýa and P!nk (featuring Missy Elliott)	"Lady Marmalade"	"Get Ur Freak On" – Missy Elliott; "Stan" – Eminem (featuring Dido); "Weapon of Choice" – Fatboy Slim†; "All for You" – Janet Jackson; "Beautiful Day" – U2	
2002	Eminem†	"Without Me"†	"In the End" – Linkin Park; "Gone" – NSYNC; "One Mic" – Nas*; "Alive" – P.O.D.; "Fell in Love with a Girl" – The White Stripes	
2003	Missy Elliott	"Work It"	"In da Club" – 50 Cent; "Hurt" – Johnny Cash†; "Lose Yourself" – Eminem; "Cry Me a River" – Justin Timberlake	
2004	Outkast*	"Hey Ya!"*	"My Band" – D12; "99 Problems" – Jay-Z; "Toxic" – Britney Spears; "Yeah!" – Usher (featuring Ludacris and Lil Jon)	
2005	Green Day	"Boulevard of Broken Dreams"	"Speed of Sound" – Coldplay; "Drop It Like It's Hot" – Snoop Dogg (featuring Pharrell); "Hollaback Girl" – Gwen Stefani; "Jesus Walks" – Kanye West	
2006	Panic! at the Disco	"I Write Sins Not Tragedies"	"Ain't No Other Man" – Christina Aguilera; "Hung Up" – Madonna; "Dani California" – Red Hot Chili Peppers*; "Hips Don't Lie" – Shakira (featuring Wyclef Jean)	
2007	Rihanna (featuring Jay-Z)	"Umbrella"	"Irreplaceable" – Beyoncé; "D.A.N.C.E." – Justice*; "What Goes Around... Comes Around" – Justin Timberlake; "Stronger" – Kanye West; "Rehab" – Amy Winehouse	
2008	Britney Spears	"Piece of Me"	"Forever" – Chris Brown; "Burnin' Up" – Jonas Brothers; "When I Grow Up" – the Pussycat Dolls; "Shut Up and Let Me Go" – The Ting Tings	
2009	Beyoncé	"Single Ladies (Put a Ring on It)"	"We Made You" – Eminem; "Poker Face" – Lady Gaga; "Womanizer" – Britney Spears; "Love Lockdown" – Kanye West	
2010	Lady Gaga	"Bad Romance"†	"Airplanes" – B.o.B (featuring Hayley Williams); "Not Afraid" – Eminem; "Dog Days Are Over" – Florence and the Machine; "Telephone" – Lady Gaga (featuring Beyoncé); "Kings and Queens" – Thirty Seconds to Mars	
2011	Katy Perry	"Firework"	"Rolling in the Deep" – Adele†; "Make Some Noise" – Beastie Boys; "Grenade" – Bruno Mars; "Yonkers" – Tyler, the Creator	
2012	Rihanna (featuring Calvin Harris)†	"We Found Love"†	"Take Care" – Drake (featuring Rihanna); "Somebody That I Used to Know" – Gotye (featuring Kimbra); "Bad Girls" – M.I.A.*; "Wide Awake" – Katy Perry	
2013	Justin Timberlake	"Mirrors"	"Thrift Shop" – Macklemore & Ryan Lewis (featuring Wanz); "Locked Out of Heaven" – Bruno Mars; "I Knew You Were Trouble" – Taylor Swift; "Blurred Lines" – Robin Thicke (featuring T.I. and Pharrell)	
2014	Miley Cyrus	"Wrecking Ball"	"Fancy" – Iggy Azalea (featuring Charli XCX); "Drunk in Love" – Beyoncé (featuring Jay-Z); "Chandelier" – Sia*; "Happy" – Pharrell Williams†	
2015	Taylor Swift (featuring Kendrick Lamar)†	"Bad Blood"†	"7/11" – Beyoncé; "Alright" – Kendrick Lamar*; "Uptown Funk" – Mark Ronson (featuring Bruno Mars); "Thinking Out Loud" – Ed Sheeran	
2016	Beyoncé†	"Formation"†	"Hello" – Adele; "Sorry" – Justin Bieber; "Hotline Bling" – Drake; "Famous" – Kanye West	
2017	Kendrick Lamar†	"Humble"†	"Scars to Your Beautiful" – Alessia Cara; "Wild Thoughts" – DJ Khaled (featuring Rihanna and Bryson Tiller); "24K Magic" – Bruno Mars; "Reminder" – The Weeknd	
2018	Camila Cabello (featuring Young Thug)	"Havana"	"Apeshit" – The Carters*; "God's Plan" – Drake; "This Is America" – Childish Gambino†; "No Tears Left to Cry" – Ariana Grande; "Finesse (Remix)" – Bruno Mars (featuring Cardi B)	
2019	Taylor Swift	"You Need to Calm Down"	"A Lot" – 21 Savage (featuring J. Cole); "Bad Guy" – Billie Eilish; "Thank U, Next" – Ariana Grande; "Sucker" – Jonas Brothers; "Old Town Road (Remix)" – Lil Nas X (featuring Billy Ray Cyrus)†	
2020	The Weeknd	"Blinding Lights"	"Everything I Wanted" – Billie Eilish; "Godzilla" – Eminem (featuring Juice Wrld); "Life Is Good" – Future (featuring Drake); "Rain on Me" – Lady Gaga with Ariana Grande; "The Man" – Taylor Swift	
2021	Lil Nas X*	"Montero (Call Me By Your Name)"*	"WAP" – Cardi B (featuring Megan Thee Stallion); "Popstar" – DJ Khaled (featuring Drake); "Kiss Me More" – Doja Cat (featuring SZA); "Bad Habits" – Ed Sheeran; "Save Your Tears" – The Weeknd	
2022	Taylor Swift†	All Too Well: The Short Film†	"Woman" – Doja Cat*; "Way 2 Sexy" – Drake featuring Future and Young Thug; "Industry Baby" – Lil Nas X and Jack Harlow; "Brutal" – Olivia Rodrigo; "Shivers" – Ed Sheeran; "As It Was" – Harry Styles*	
2023	Taylor Swift†	"Anti-Hero"	"Flowers" – Miley Cyrus; "Attention" – Doja Cat; "Super Freaky Girl" – Nicki Minaj; "Vampire" – Olivia Rodrigo; "Unholy" – Sam Smith and Kim Petras; "Kill Bill" – SZA	
2024	Taylor Swift (featuring Post Malone)	"Fortnight"*	"Paint the Town Red" – Doja Cat; "Lunch" – Billie Eilish; "Houdini" – Eminem*; "We Can't Be Friends (Wait for Your Love)" – Ariana Grande; "Snooze" – SZA	
2025	Ariana Grande	Brighter Days Ahead	Billie Eilish – "Birds of a Feather"; Kendrick Lamar – "Not Like Us"†; Lady Gaga and Bruno Mars – "Die with a Smile"; Rosé and Bruno Mars – "APT."; Sabrina Carpenter – "Manchild"*; The Weeknd and Playboi Carti – "Timeless"	
2026	Taylor Swift	"The Fate of Ophelia"	Ariana Grande – "Hate That I Made You Love Me"; Bruno Mars – "I Just Might"; Gener8ion featuring Yung Lean – "Storm"; Madonna – Confessions II – The Film; Sabrina Carpenter – "Tears"	

== Statistics ==
=== Artists with multiple wins ===
6 wins

- Taylor Swift

2 wins

- Beyoncé
- Eminem
- Kendrick Lamar (Note: 1 as a featured artist.)
- Missy Elliott (Note: 1 as a featured artist.)
- Rihanna

=== Artists with multiple nominations ===
9 nominations

- Eminem (Note: 1 with D12.)

8 nominations

- Bruno Mars (Note: 1 as a featured artist.)
- Taylor Swift

7 nominations

- Beyoncé (Note: 1 as a featured artist; 1 with The Carters.)

6 nominations

- Ariana Grande
- Drake (Note: 2 as a featured artist.)

5 nominations

- Justin Timberlake (Note: 2 with NSYNC.)
- Lady Gaga
- Madonna

4 nominations

- Billie Eilish
- Doja Cat
- Jay-Z (Note: 2 as a featured artist; 1 with The Carters.)
- Kanye West
- Rihanna (Note: 2 as a featured artist.)
- U2
- Kendrick Lamar (Note: 1 as a featured artist.)
- The Weeknd

3 nominations

- Aerosmith
- Britney Spears
- Ed Sheeran
- Lil Nas X
- Michael Jackson
- Missy Elliott (Note: 1 as a featured artist.)
- Pharrell Williams (Note: 2 as a featured artist.)
- R.E.M.
- Red Hot Chili Peppers
- SZA

2 nominations

- Adele
- Beastie Boys
- Christina Aguilera
- David Lee Roth
- DJ Khaled
- Don Henley
- Future (Note: 1 as a featured artist.)
- Green Day
- Gwen Stefani (Note: 1 with No Doubt.)
- Janet Jackson
- Jonas Brothers
- Justin Bieber (Note: 1 as a starring performer in the video but not a featured artist.)
- Katy Perry
- Lil' Kim (Note: 1 as a featured artist.)
- Miley Cyrus
- Nirvana
- NSYNC
- Olivia Rodrigo
- Peter Gabriel
- Sabrina Carpenter
- Steve Winwood
- Will Smith
- Young Thug (Note: Both as a featured artist.)

== See also ==
- Grammy Award for Best Music Video
- MTV Europe Music Award for Best Video
