= Kevin Seal =

American television presenter

- Occupations: Television presenter; voice actor
- Years active: 1986–present
- Spouse: Lynn Shelton (m. 1993; div. 2019)
- Children: 1

Kevin Seal is an American television presenter and voice actor.

== Biography ==
Seal was an MTV VJ in the late 1980s, the host of the pilot of Club MTV (according to an MTV special) and one of the hosts of the influential alternative-music program 120 Minutes, which debuted in 1986. After leaving the program, he hosted MTV's Headbangers Ball from 1987 to 1988 and Kevin Seal: Sporting Fool for which he won a Cable Ace Award in 1990. Since leaving MTV, he made occasional TV and movie appearances, including a starring role in the 1992 interactive cinema film I'm Your Man. In 2000, he was cast as voice talent for both the lead character and primary antagonist in the Cartoon Network series Sheep in the Big City. Seal was also the host for the pilot episode of the Nickelodeon game show, Figure it Out in 1996 before Summer Sanders took over as the series host when the show officially premiered a year later. After going to school for industrial design, he began designing and building furniture.

== Personal life ==
Seal lives in Seattle. He was married to director Lynn Shelton. He does voiceover work and is a stay-at-home dad to his son, Milo.
