= MTV Video Music Award for Best Stage Performance in a Video =

Annual music video award

The MTV Video Music Award for Best Stage Performance in a Video was first awarded at the first annual MTV Video Music Awards in 1984. The last of this award was given out in 1989.

== Recipients ==
Year	Winner	Other nominees
1984	Van Halen — "Jump"	David Bowie — "Modern Love"; Duran Duran — "The Reflex"; Bette Midler — "Beast of Burden"; The Pretenders — "Middle of the Road"
1985	Bruce Springsteen — "Dancing in the Dark"	David Bowie — "Blue Jean (live)"; Eurythmics — "Would I Lie to You?"; Talking Heads — "Once in a Lifetime (live)"; Tina Turner — "Better Be Good to Me"
1986	Bryan Adams and Tina Turner — "It's Only Love"	Dire Straits — "Money for Nothing"; Huey Lewis and the News — "The Power of Love"; Robert Palmer — "Addicted to Love"; Pete Townshend — "Face the Face"
1987	Bon Jovi — "Livin' on a Prayer"	Bon Jovi — "You Give Love a Bad Name"; Run-D.M.C. — "Walk This Way"; Bruce Springsteen and the E Street Band — "Born to Run"; Bruce Springsteen and the E Street Band — "War"
1988	Prince — "U Got the Look"	Aerosmith — "Dude (Looks Like a Lady)"; Grateful Dead — "Touch of Grey"; Elton John — "Candle in the Wind (live)"; Roy Orbison — "Oh, Pretty Woman (live)"; U2 — "Where the Streets Have No Name"
1989	Living Colour — "Cult of Personality"	Bobby Brown — "My Prerogative"; Def Leppard — "Pour Some Sugar on Me"; Guns N' Roses — "Paradise City"

== See also ==
- MTV Europe Music Award for Best Live Act
- MTV Europe Music Award for Best World Stage Performance
