= Wild Wild Life =

1986 single by Talking Heads

Single by Talking Heads

from the album True Stories
- B-side: "People Like Us" (movie version)
- Released: August 1986
- Genre: New wave; synth-rock
- Length: 3:39 (album version); 5:30 (extended version)
- Label: Sire
- Songwriter: David Byrne
- Producers: Andy Zax; Talking Heads

Talking Heads singles chronology
| "Once in a Lifetime" (live) (1986) | "Wild Wild Life" (1986) | "Love for Sale" (1986) |

Music video
- "Wild Wild Life" on YouTube

"Wild Wild Life" is a song by American rock band Talking Heads, released in August 1986 as the lead single from their seventh studio album, True Stories (1986). It was the band's third and last top-40 hit on the US Billboard Hot 100 chart. It was also successful worldwide, peaking at number two in New Zealand and number nine in Ireland.

== Critical reception ==
Cash Box called it "quirky and typically fun." Billboard said that Talking Heads "put a minimal post-new wave accompaniment to a bouncy singalong tune."

== Music video ==
The video for the song won "Best Group Video" at the MTV Video Music Awards in 1987. Taken from the film True Stories, with some additional content, it includes band member Jerry Harrison parodying Billy Idol, Kid Creole, Ralph Macchio's character in The Karate Kid, and Prince. "My favorite T. Heads video, the most fun to make," Harrison recalled in the liner notes of Once in a Lifetime: The Best of Talking Heads. "I always wondered what Prince thought of it." The rest of the band also appears in various costumes.

The video is set in a 1960s ambienced cabaret bar, where a frantic series of unannounced performers lip sync to the song, imitating such singers as Madonna and Prince as disjointed images play across a wall of video screens behind them. Byrne wrote about this scene:

The song itself becomes a vehicle that can say anything they want it to. Some gestures and movements are obviously derived from well-known sources: television shows ... movies ... and, most recently, rock videos. Odd to think that some lip-synchers are imitating characters in videos, who are really musicians imitating other characters.

Actor John Goodman, yet to achieve fame with the sitcom Roseanne, appeared in both the film and MTV versions of the video. Goodman was also featured on the B-side's "People Like Us", a song that also appeared in the film.

== Track listings ==
7-inch single
| No. | Title | Length |
|---|---|---|
| 1. | "Wild Wild Life" | 3:39 |
| 2. | "People Like Us" (movie version) | 4:23 |

12-inch single
| No. | Title | Length |
|---|---|---|
| 1. | "Wild Wild Life" (extended mix) | 5:30 |
| 2. | "Wild Wild Life" | 3:39 |
| 3. | "People Like Us" (movie version) | 4:23 |

== Charts ==
=== Weekly charts ===
Weekly chart performance for "Wild Wild Life"
| Chart (1986) | Peak position |
|---|---|
| Australia (Kent Music Report) | 13 |
| Belgium (Ultratop 50 Flanders) | 20 |
| Ireland (IRMA) | 9 |
| Netherlands (Single Top 100) | 42 |
| New Zealand (Recorded Music NZ) | 2 |
| Switzerland (Schweizer Hitparade) | 20 |
| UK Singles (Official Charts) | 43 |
| US Billboard Hot 100 | 25 |
| US Mainstream Rock (Billboard) | 4 |
| US Cash Box Top 100 | 25 |
| West Germany (GfK) | 40 |

=== Year-end charts ===
Year-end chart performance for "Wild Wild Life"
| Chart (1986) | Position |
|---|---|
| Australia (Kent Music Report) | 92 |
| New Zealand (RIANZ) | 44 |
