= Mediate (song) =

INXS song

Song by INXS

from the album Kick
- Released: 19 October 1987
- Genre: New wave; trip hop
- Length: 2:36
- Label: WEA
- Songwriters: Andrew Farriss, Michael Hutchence
- Producer: Chris Thomas

"Mediate" is a song by INXS from their 1987 album, Kick. On the album, the song segues from their big hit single, "Need You Tonight." The song has the distinction of having almost every line rhyme with the word "ate" (as in "Mediate").

== Lyrical content ==
According to the liner notes of the remastered Kick, Andrew Farriss received help from Michael Hutchence with the lyrics. In return, Farriss helped Hutchence with the lyrics to "Guns in the Sky," and a compromise was reached: Farriss received sole credit on "Mediate," and Hutchence received sole credit on "Guns in the Sky."

== Music video ==
The song was never released as a single, but there was a video for it, which followed "Need You Tonight". Both the video and the song pay homage to the promotional film clip for Bob Dylan's "Subterranean Homesick Blues", as the members flip cue cards with words from the song on them, followed by Kirk Pengilly with a Soprano saxophone solo.

Beneath the lyric "a special date" in the "Mediate" portion of the video, the cue card shown reads "9-8-1945". This refers to the date 9 August 1945, which was the date the atomic bomb, codenamed "Fat Man", was dropped on Nagasaki, Japan. As the date is in the little endian format, with the day first and month second (as per convention in Australia), American observers sometimes confuse the date for 8 September 1945.

The cards contain multiple spelling mistakes, e.g., "Facinate," which should have been "Fascinate", further emulating Dylan's video.

The video was filmed near blast furnace number 6, Port Kembla Steelworks, NSW, Australia.

== Mediate: The Ralphi Rosario Remixes (featuring Tricky) ==
"Mediate"

Single by INXS featuring Tricky

from the album Mediate: The Ralphi Rosario Remixes
- Released: 20 September 2011
- Recorded: 2010–2011
- Genre: Rock, pop, dub, house, electronic
- Length: 19:51
- Label: Petrol Electric
- Songwriters: Andrew Farriss; Michael Hutchence
- Producer: Ralphi Rosario

INXS singles chronology
"Never Tear Us Apart" (2010)	"Mediate" (2011)

Promotional single cover

In 2010, "Mediate" was re-recorded by INXS and featured Tricky on vocals. The song was remixed by Ralphi Rosario. The recording was originally released on the band's twelfth studio album, Original Sin. On 29 July 2011, a promotional, three-track single was released through Petrol Electric/Atco Records to U.S. Billboard and radio stations. The disc contained three different remix versions of "Mediate" all done by Rosario. 16 September 2011, the song peaked at #5 on the Billboard dance chart. 20 September 2011, an official, three-track single entitled Mediate: The Ralphi Rosario Remixes was released as a digital download by Petrol Electric (Rhino). The MP3 album had the same track listing as the aforementioned promo disc. Additional promotional remixes were released to Billboard Dance Chart reporters, entitled "The Empulsive Naked Highway Mixes" by Reed McGowan and Sy Boccari.

=== Track listing ===
All tracks are remixed by Ralphi Rosario and feature Tricky on vocals.

Mediate: The Ralphi Rosario Remixes
No.	Title	Length
1.	"Mediate" (Ralphi Rosario Vocal)	7:46
2.	"Mediate" (Ralphi Rosario Minimal Vocal/Dub)	7:59
3.	"Mediate" (Ralphi Rosario Radio)	4:06
Total length:		19:51

== Charts ==
Chart (2011)	Peak position
U.S. Billboard Hot Dance Club Songs	5
