= 2001 MTV Video Music Awards =

Award ceremony

- Date: Thursday, September 6, 2001
- Location: Metropolitan Opera House, New York City
- Country: United States
- Hosted by: Jamie Foxx
- Most awards: Fatboy Slim (6)
- Most nominations: Fatboy Slim (9)
- Website: http://www.mtv.com/ontv/vma/past-vmas/2001/

Television/radio coverage
- Network: MTV
- Produced by: Alex Coletti; Salli Frattini; Dave Sirulnick
- Directed by: Beth McCarthy-Miller

The 2001 MTV Video Music Awards aired live on September 6, 2001, honoring the best music videos from June 10, 2000, to June 8, 2001. The show was hosted by Jamie Foxx at the Metropolitan Opera House in New York City.

Highlights of the show included a surprise appearance by Michael Jackson at the end of *NSYNC's performance and an iconic performance from Britney Spears, in which she premiered her single "I'm a Slave 4 U" while utilizing a host of live animals, including an Albino python draped over her shoulders. Macy Gray wore a dress with a promotional message, instructing viewers to buy her new album. Andy Dick portrayed a fictional cousin of Christina Aguilera, Daphne Aguilera, who, in a skit, "attacked" Aguilera in the audience. The show also featured memorials for Aaliyah and Joey Ramone. Many of the night's winners dedicated awards to the two fallen musicians over the course of the telecast.

Fatboy Slim took home six Moonmen, the most of the evening, for his "Weapon of Choice" video, which featured the dancing talents of actor Christopher Walken. *NSYNC's "Pop" took home four awards. Christina Aguilera, Lil' Kim, Mýa, Pink and Missy "Misdemeanor" Elliott took home two awards, including the Video of the Year award, for their collaborative rendition of "Lady Marmalade".

The World Trade Center towers that featured in Limp Bizkit's winning rock video were destroyed in the September 11 attacks five days later.

== Background ==
MTV announced on July 23 that the 2001 Video Music Awards would be held on September 6 at the Metropolitan Opera House in New York. Nominees were announced on the same day. The ceremony marked the introduction of the fan-voted MTV2 Award, which was meant to honor videos that debuted on MTV2. Jamie Foxx was announced as host on August 7. The ceremony broadcast was preceded by the 2001 MTV Video Music Awards Opening Act. Hosted by Kurt Loder and SuChin Pak with reports from Chris Connelly, John Norris, Iann Robinson, Sway, and Gideon Yago, the broadcast featured red carpet interviews, pre-taped features on DMX, Pink's and Ja Rule's outfit selection, and a challenge to remix music from Carmen, and performances from Alien Ant Farm and City High featuring Eve. Viewers were able to vote on which outfit Pink and Ja Rule should wear prior to the pre-show.

== Performances ==
Spears' performance with an albino Burmese python. The performance garnered negative criticism from PETA.

List of musical performances
Artist(s)	Song(s)
Pre-show
Alien Ant Farm	"Smooth Criminal"
City High (featuring Eve)	"What Would You Do?" "Caramel"
Main show
Jennifer Lopez; Ja Rule	"Love Don't Cost a Thing" (Lopez only) "I'm Real (Murder Remix)"
Linkin Park; The X-Ecutioners	"One Step Closer"
Alicia Keys	"Für Elise" "Fallin'"
*NSYNC; Michael Jackson	"Pop"
Jay-Z	"Izzo (H.O.V.A.)"
Staind	"Fade"
Missy "Misdemeanor" Elliott	"Get Ur Freak On (remix)" (featuring Nelly Furtado) "One Minute Man" (featuring Ludacris and Trina)
U2	"Elevation" "Stuck in a Moment You Can't Get Out Of"
Britney Spears	"I'm a Slave 4 U"

== Presenters ==
=== Pre-show ===
- Chris Connelly and Gideon Yago – announced the winners of the professional categories and Breakthrough Video

=== Main show ===
- Bond – performed during the intermissions
- Backstreet Boys – presented Best Hip-Hop Video
- Will Ferrell – parodied the Tim Commerford incident from the 2000 VMAs
- Destiny's Child – presented Best Direction in a Video
- Janet Jackson, Missy Elliott, Timbaland, Ginuwine and Rashad Haughton – paid tribute to Aaliyah
- Jessica Simpson, Mandy Moore and Dream – presented Best Dance Video
- Dale Earnhardt Jr. – introduced Linkin Park
- Julia Stiles and Chris Kattan – performed an "interpretive dance" to the Viewer's Choice Award nominees
- Christina Aguilera, Lil' Kim, Mýa and Pink – presented Best Male Video
- Will Smith – presented Best Female Video
- Nelly, Macy Gray and Mary J. Blige – presented Best New Artist in a Video
- Christopher Walken – introduced 'N Sync
- Moby, Eve and Gwen Stefani – presented the MTV2 Award
- Andy Dick (as "Daphne Aguilera") – performed a snippet of "Naughty Baby Did a No-No" (Viewer's Choice Award vignette)
- Tenacious D – presented Best Group Video
- Usher and Estella Warren – presented Best R&B Video
- Mark Wahlberg – introduced rapper DMX and introduced Staind with him
- P. Diddy and Ben Stiller – presented Best Rap Video
- Triumph the Insult Comic Dog – appeared in a vignette about the Viewer's Choice Award
- Nikka Costa and Sheryl Crow – presented Best Pop Video
- Shakira and Busta Rhymes – introduced Missy "Misdemeanor" Elliott, Ludacris, Nelly Furtado and Trina
- Jon Bon Jovi and Jewel – presented Best Video from a Film
- Carson Daly – presented the Video Vanguard Award
- Ramones (Johnny, Marky and C.J.) – received a tribute from U2 during their Video Vanguard acceptance speech
- Johnny Knoxville and Snoop Dogg – presented Best Rock Video
- Ananda Lewis – presented Viewer's Choice with the winners of MTV's "Last Fans Standing" contest
- OutKast – introduced Britney Spears
- Kid Rock and Mick Jagger – presented Video of the Year

== Winners and nominees ==
Nominees were selected by approximately 500 members of the music industry and MTV viewers. Winners in general categories, except for the Viewer's Choice awards and MTV2 Award, were selected by members of the music industry and MTV viewers. Winners in professional categories were selected by members of the music industry. Winners of the Viewer's Choice awards and the MTV2 Award were selected by viewers. Voting for the MTV2 Award and Viewer's Choice award was conducted on MTV's website and, in the case of the latter award, through phone voting that continued through the ceremony broadcast. MTV announced after the broadcast that over five million votes were cast for the Viewer's Choice award and nearly one million votes were cast for the MTV2 Award.

Winners are in bold text.

Video of the Year	Best Male Video
**Christina Aguilera, Lil' Kim, Mýa and Pink (featuring Missy "Misdemeanor" Elliott) – "Lady Marmalade"**; Missy "Misdemeanor" Elliott – "Get Ur Freak On"; Eminem (featuring Dido) – "Stan"; Fatboy Slim – "Weapon of Choice"; Janet Jackson – "All for You"; U2 – "Beautiful Day"	**Moby (featuring Gwen Stefani) – "South Side"**; Eminem (featuring Dido) – "Stan"; Lenny Kravitz – "Again"; Nelly – "Ride wit Me"; Robbie Williams – "Rock DJ"
Best Female Video	Best Group Video
**Eve (featuring Gwen Stefani) – "Let Me Blow Ya Mind"**; Dido – "Thank You"; Missy "Misdemeanor" Elliott – "Get Ur Freak On"; Janet Jackson – "All for You"; Jennifer Lopez – "Love Don't Cost a Thing"; Madonna – "Don't Tell Me"	***NSYNC – "Pop"**; Destiny's Child – "Survivor"; Incubus – "Drive"; Dave Matthews Band – "I Did It"; U2 – "Elevation (Tomb Raider Mix)"
Best New Artist in a Video	Best Pop Video
**Alicia Keys – "Fallin'"**; Coldplay – "Yellow"; Nikka Costa – "Like a Feather"; David Gray – "Babylon"; Sum 41 – "Fat Lip"	***NSYNC – "Pop"**; Christina Aguilera, Lil' Kim, Mýa and Pink (featuring Missy "Misdemeanor" Elliott) – "Lady Marmalade"; Backstreet Boys – "The Call"; Destiny's Child – "Survivor"; Britney Spears – "Stronger"
Best Rock Video	Best R&B Video
**Limp Bizkit – "Rollin' (Air Raid Vehicle)"**; Aerosmith – "Jaded"; Linkin Park – "Crawling"; Staind – "It's Been Awhile"; Weezer – "Hash Pipe"	**Destiny's Child – "Survivor"**; 112 – "Peaches & Cream"; Sunshine Anderson – "Heard It All Before"; R. Kelly – "I Wish"; Jill Scott – "Gettin' In the Way"
Best Rap Video	Best Hip-Hop Video
**Nelly – "Ride wit Me"**; Eminem (featuring Dido) – "Stan"; Ja Rule (featuring Lil' Mo and Vita) – "Put It on Me"; Jay-Z – "I Just Wanna Love U (Give It 2 Me)"; Snoop Dogg (featuring Master P, Nate Dogg, Butch Cassidy and Tha Eastsidaz) – "Lay Low"	**OutKast – "Ms. Jackson"**; The Black Eyed Peas (featuring Macy Gray) – "Request + Line"; City High – "What Would You Do?"; Missy "Misdemeanor" Elliott – "Get Ur Freak On"; Eve (featuring Gwen Stefani) – "Let Me Blow Ya Mind"
Best Dance Video	Best Video from a Film
***NSYNC – "Pop"**; Christina Aguilera, Lil' Kim, Mýa and Pink (featuring Missy "Misdemeanor" Elliott) – "Lady Marmalade"; Fatboy Slim – "Weapon of Choice"; Janet Jackson – "All for You"; Jennifer Lopez – "Love Don't Cost a Thing"	**Christina Aguilera, Lil' Kim, Mýa and Pink (featuring Missy "Misdemeanor" Elliott) – "Lady Marmalade" (from Moulin Rouge!)**; Destiny's Child – "Independent Women Part I" (from Charlie's Angels); DMX – "No Sunshine" (from Exit Wounds); K-Ci & JoJo – "Crazy" (from Save the Last Dance); U2 – "Elevation (Tomb Raider Mix)" (from Lara Croft: Tomb Raider)
Breakthrough Video	Best Direction in a Video
**Fatboy Slim – "Weapon of Choice"**; Common (featuring Macy Gray) – "Geto Heaven (remix)"; Gorillaz – "Clint Eastwood"; *NSYNC – "Pop"; R.E.M. – "Imitation of Life"; Robbie Williams – "Rock DJ"	**Fatboy Slim – "Weapon of Choice" (Director: Spike Jonze)**; Eminem (featuring Dido) – "Stan" (Directors: Dr. Dre and Phillip Atwell); Linkin Park – "Crawling" (Directors: Brothers Strause); OutKast – "Ms. Jackson" (Director: F. Gary Gray); R.E.M. – "Imitation of Life" (Director: Garth Jennings)
Best Choreography in a Video	Best Special Effects in a Video
**Fatboy Slim – "Weapon of Choice" (Choreographers: Michael Rooney, Spike Jonze and Christopher Walken)**; Christina Aguilera, Lil' Kim, Mýa and Pink (featuring Missy "Misdemeanor" Elliott) – "Lady Marmalade" (Choreographer: Tina Landon); Janet Jackson – "All for You" (Choreographers: Shawnette Heard, Marty Kudelka and Roger Lee); Madonna – "Don't Tell Me" (Choreographer: Jamie King)	**Robbie Williams – "Rock DJ" (Special Effects: Carter White FX, Audio Motion and Clear Post Production)**; Missy "Misdemeanor" Elliott – "Get Ur Freak On" (Special Effects: Glenn Bennett); Fatboy Slim – "Weapon of Choice" (Special Effects: Ben Gibbs); U2 – "Elevation (Tomb Raider Mix)" (Special Effects: Pixel Envy and Chris Watts)
Best Art Direction in a Video	Best Editing in a Video
**Fatboy Slim – "Weapon of Choice" (Art Director: Val Wilt)**; Aerosmith – "Jaded" (Art Director: Laura Fox); Christina Aguilera, Lil' Kim, Mýa and Pink (featuring Missy "Misdemeanor" Elliott) – "Lady Marmalade" (Art Director: Bernadette Dus); Gorillaz – "Clint Eastwood" (Art Directors: Pete Candeland and Jamie Hewlett)	**Fatboy Slim – "Weapon of Choice" (Editor: Eric Zumbrunnen)**; Missy "Misdemeanor" Elliott – "Get Ur Freak On" (Editor: Scott Richter); *NSYNC – "Pop" (Editor: Chrome); U2 – "Elevation (Tomb Raider Mix)" (Editor: Joseph Kahn)
Best Cinematography in a Video	MTV2 Award
**Fatboy Slim – "Weapon of Choice" (Director of Photography: Lance Acord)**; Aerosmith – "Jaded" (Director of Photography: Thomas Kloss); Missy "Misdemeanor" Elliott – "Get Ur Freak On" (Director of Photography: James Hawkinson); Eminem (featuring Dido) – "Stan" (Director of Photography: Dariusz Wolski)	**Mudvayne – "Dig"**; Craig David – "Fill Me In"; Gorillaz – "Clint Eastwood"; India.Arie – "Video"; Jurassic 5 – "Quality Control"; Alicia Keys – "Fallin'"
Viewer's Choice	International Viewer's Choice: MTV Australia
***NSYNC – "Pop"**; Backstreet Boys – "The Call"; Destiny's Child – "Independent Women Part I"; Eve (featuring Gwen Stefani) – "Let Me Blow Ya Mind"; Limp Bizkit – "My Way"; Nelly – "Ride wit Me"	**Paul Mac – "Just the Thing"**; Aneiki – "Pleased to Meet You"; The Avalanches – "Since I Left You"; Fatt Dex (featuring MC Trey) – "Creepin'"; Superheist – "Step Back"
International Viewer's Choice: MTV Brasil	International Viewer's Choice: MTV India (Hindi film category)
**Charlie Brown Jr. – "Rubão, o Dono do Mundo"**; Ana Carolina – "Quem de Nós Dois"; Adriana Calcanhotto – "Devolva-Me"; Wanessa Camargo – "O Amor Não Deixa"; Catedral – "Eu Amo Mais Você"; Patrícia Coelho – "O Meu Sangue Ferve por Você"; Cogumelo Plutão – "Esperando na Janela"; Falamansa – "Rindo à Toa/Xote dos Milagres"; Jota Quest – "O Que Eu Também Não Entendo"; KLB – "Ela Não Está Aqui"; Maurício Manieri – "Primavera"; Mary's Band – "Happy Birthday"; Os Paralamas do Sucesso – "Aonde Quer Que Eu Vá"; O Rappa – "O Que Sobrou do Céu"; Rumbora – "O Mapa da Mina"; Sandy & Junior – "A Lenda"; Skank – "Balada do Amor Inabalável"; Tihuana – "Que Vês?"; Twister – "40 Graus"; Jay Vaquer – "A Miragem"	**Asha Bhosle, Sonu Nigam and Sukhwinder Singh – "Kambakth Ishq"**; Sunidhi Chauhan, Jaspinder Narula and Shankar Mahadevan – "Bumbro"; Alka Yagnik and Udit Narayan – "Aaja Mahiya"; Alka Yagnik, Udit Narayan, Sukhwinder Singh and Srinivas – "Mitwa"; Alka Yagnik, Kumar Sanu and Udit Narayan – "Dil Ne Yeh Kaha Hain Dil Se"
International Viewer's Choice: MTV India (Hindi pop category)	International Viewer's Choice: MTV Japan
**Sultan Khan and K. S. Chithra – "Piya Basanti"**; Lucky Ali – "Tere Mere Saath"; Colonial Cousins – "Guiding Star"; Falguni Pathak – "Meri Chunar Udd Jaye"; Shubha Mudgal – "Mann Ke Manjeere"	**Hikaru Utada – "Can You Keep a Secret?"**; Chemistry – "Pieces of a Dream"; Gospellers – "Towa Ni"; L'Arc-en-Ciel – "Stay Away"; Misia – "Rhythm Reflection"
International Viewer's Choice: MTV Korea	International Viewer's Choice: MTV Latin America (North)
**g.o.d – "Lie"**; Cho Sung Mo – "Do You Know?"; Lee Seung-Hwan – "Of You, for You"; Park Ji-yoon – "Adult Ceremony"; Position – "I Love You"	**Alejandro Sanz – "El Alma al Aire"**; Control Machete (featuring Ely Guerra) – "Amores Perros (De Perros Amores)"; Genitallica – "Imagina"; La Ley – "Fuera de Mí"; Paulina Rubio – "Y Yo Sigo Aquí"
International Viewer's Choice: MTV Latin America (Central)	International Viewer's Choice: MTV Latin America (South)
**Dracma – "Hijo de Puta"**; Chancho en Piedra – "Eligiendo una Reina"; La Ley – "Fuera de Mí"; Paulina Rubio – "Y Yo Sigo Aquí"; Stereo 3 – "Atrévete a Aceptarlo"	**Catupecu Machu – "Y Lo Que Quiero Es Que Pises sin el Suelo"**; Natalia Oreiro – "Tu Veneno"; Fito Páez – "El Diablo de Tu Corazón"; Paulina Rubio – "Y Yo Sigo Aquí"; Alejandro Sanz – "El Alma al Aire"
International Viewer's Choice: MTV Mandarin	International Viewer's Choice: MTV Russia
**Jolin Tsai – "Fall in Love with a Street"**; Jacky Cheung – "Complain for Reason"; Gigi Leung – "The Price of Love"; Liang Jing Ru – "Courage"; Karen Mok – "Lazy to Bother"; Sticky Rice – "Taekwondo"; Stefanie Sun – "The Happiness That I Need"; Nicholas Tse – "Jade Butterfly"; Leehom Wang – "Son of Dragon"; Zhang Hui Mei – "One Night Stand"	**t.A.T.u. – "Ya Soshla S Uma"**; Alsou – "Before You Love Me"; Mumiy Troll – "Moya Pevitsa"
International Viewer's Choice: MTV Southeast Asia	
**Kyla – "Hanggang Ngayon"**; Black Maria – "Veto"; Dome – "Pa Lao"; Naif – "Posessif"
Michael Jackson Video Vanguard Award
**U2**

== Artists with multiple wins and nominations ==
Artists who received multiple awards
Wins	Artist
6	Fatboy Slim
4	*NSYNC
2	Christina Aguilera
2	Lil' Kim
2	Mýa
2	Pink

Artists who received multiple nominations
Nominations	Artist
9	Fatboy Slim
6	Christina Aguilera
6	Lil' Kim
6	Missy Elliott
6	Mýa
6	*NSYNC
6	Pink
5	Destiny's Child
5	Eminem
5	U2
4	Janet Jackson
3	Aerosmith
3	Alka Yagnik
3	Eve
3	Gorillaz
3	Nelly
3	Paulina Rubio
3	Robbie Williams
3	Udit Narayan
2	Alejandro Sanz
2	Alicia Keys
2	Backstreet Boys
2	Jennifer Lopez
2	La Ley
2	Limp Bizkit
2	Linkin Park
2	Madonna
2	OutKast
2	R.E.M.
2	Sukhwinder Singh

== Music Videos with multiple wins and nominations ==
Music Videos that received multiple awards
Wins	Artist	Music Video
6	Fatboy Slim	"Weapon of Choice"
4	*NSYNC	"Pop"
2	Christina Aguilera, Lil' Kim, Mýa and Pink (featuring Missy Elliott)	"Lady Marmalade"

Music Videos that received multiple nominations
Nominations	Artist	Music Video
9	Fatboy Slim	"Weapon of Choice"
6	Christina Aguilera, Lil' Kim, Mýa and Pink (featuring Missy Elliott)	"Lady Marmalade"
6	Missy Elliott	"Get Ur Freak On"
6	*NSYNC	"Pop"
5	Eminem (featuring Dido)	"Stan"
4	Janet Jackson	"All for You"
4	U2	"Elevation (Tomb Raider Mix)"
3	Aerosmith	"Jaded"
3	Destiny's Child	"Survivor"
3	Eve (featuring Gwen Stefani)	"Let Me Blow Ya Mind"
3	Gorillaz	"Clint Eastwood"
3	Nelly	"Ride wit Me"
3	Paulina Rubio	"Y Yo Sigo Aquí"
3	Robbie Williams	"Rock DJ"
2	Alejandro Sanz	"El Alma al Aire"
2	Alicia Keys	"Fallin'"
2	Backstreet Boys	"The Call"
2	Destiny's Child	"Independent Women Part I"
2	Jennifer Lopez	"Love Don't Cost a Thing"
2	La Ley	"Fuera de Mí"
2	Linkin Park	"Crawling"
2	Madonna	"Don't Tell Me"
2	OutKast	"Ms. Jackson"
2	R.E.M.	"Imitation of Life"

== See also ==
- 2001 MTV Europe Music Awards
