= MTV Video Music Award for International Viewer's Choice =

Annual music video award

MTV's International Viewer's Choice awards honored the best music videos as voted for by the audiences of MTV's channels around the world. They were given out every year during the VMAs from 1989 to 2003.

== History ==
The first International Viewer's Choice Awards were given out in 1989, with viewers in Europe, Japan, and Latin America choosing their favorite videos for that year. The following year, MTV viewers in Australia and Brazil also received the chance to vote for their favorite video of 1990, and in 1991 viewers from Asia followed suit. From then on, the International Viewer's Choice awards became a fixture of the MTV Video Music Awards and were handed out every year until 2003, when MTV Australia and MTV Brasil crowned their last winners.

== Winners ==
=== MTV Asia ===
The International Viewer's Choice Award for MTV Asia was given out every year from 1991 to 1998, save for 1994. As MTV's influence over Asia increased, different countries broke off from MTV Asia and got their own local MTV channels. Subsequently, each new Asian MTV channel also received a separate Viewer's Choice category, namely MTV Mandarin (China and Taiwan) in 1995, MTV India in 1996, and MTV Korea in 1999. In 1999, with a much smaller pool of member countries, this award became the International Viewer's Choice Award for MTV Southeast Asia.

The two biggest nominees in this category are Indus Creed from India and Dewa 19 from Indonesia, both of whom are the only artists in the award's history to receive two nominations. However, Indus Creed managed to at least score a win in 1993, while Dewa 19 went away empty-handed both times. Also, while there is no real big winner for this award, as no artist has won it more than once, Indonesia does claim the distinction of being the only country to have produced multiple winners for this category, while Thailand is the only country to have had at least one nominated artist per year of this award's existence.

Following is a list of winners of the International Viewer's Choice Award for MTV Asia.

Year	Winner	Other nominees
1991	Cui Jian — "Wild in the Snow"	Kenny Bee — "Be Brave to Love"; Bird — "Prik Kee Noo"; Chris Ho — "Fictional Stuff"
1992	Christina — "Jing Mai Klua"	R.A.P. (Roslan Aziz Productions) artists — "Ikhlas Tapi Jauh"; Chang Yu-sheng — "Take Me to the Moon"; The Dawn — "Iisang Bangka Tayo"; Lo Ta-yu — "Story of the Train"; Marsha — "Taak-Hak"
1993	Indus Creed — "Pretty Child"	Beyond — "The Great Wall"; Jerry Huang — "The Love March"; Mai — "Sia-Jai-Dai-Yin-Mai"; Tang Dynasty — "A Dream Return to Tang Dynasty"
1994	No award given	
1995	Denada — "Sambutlah"	Alisha — "Made in India"; Indus Creed — "Trapped"; Jetrin — "Love Train"; Kim Gun-mo — "Betrayed Love"
1996	Seo Taiji and Boys — "Come Back Home"	Dewa 19 — "Cukup Siti Nurbaya"; IE — "Chan Tang Jai"; Put3ska — "Manila Girl"
1997	The Eraserheads — "Ang Huling El Bimbo"	Dewa 19 — "Kirana"; Joey Boy — "Fun Fun Fun"; KRU — "Fanatik"; Lee Seung-hwan — "Family"
1998	Chrisye — "Kala Cinta Menggoda"	H.O.T. — "We Are the Future"; Innuendo — "Belaian Jiwa"; Kulay — "Shout"; Nicole Theriault — "Kapolo"

=== MTV Australia ===
The International Viewer's Choice Award for MTV Australia was given out from 1990 to 2003. From 1993 to 1996, however, the Australian Viewer's Choice Award was not given out since MTV Australia, the syndicated show on the Nine Network, was canceled and Australia was left without an MTV channel. This award returned in 1997, the same year in which the present-day channel MTV Australia began broadcasting, and was given out every year (except for 2000) until 2003.

The category's biggest nominees are Silverchair, who received a total of four nominations throughout the award's history. Out of their four nominations from 1997 to 2002, Silverchair won the award twice, thus also becoming the award's biggest (and only multiple) winner. Closely following are Kylie Minogue and Powderfinger with three nominations each, and Boom Crash Opera, Spiderbait, and Neil Finn with two (Finn received one nomination with Crowded House and one as a solo artist, though).

Due to the crossover potential that Australian musicians have in the U.S. market, a few artists have received nominations for both the Australian Viewer's Choice award and other general or professional awards in the same year. However, an Australian artist has never won this award and another one during the main show: Midnight Oil, for example, won the Australian Viewer's Choice in 1990 but did not succeed in their bid for Best Group Video. Meanwhile, Natalie Imbruglia succeeded in winning the Best New Artist award in 1998 but lost the Australian race to Kylie Minogue. Four years later Minogue would go through the same situation, winning Best Choreography but losing her native country's Viewer's Choice race to Holly Valance.

Following is a list of winners of the International Viewer's Choice Award for MTV Australia.

Year	Winner	Other nominees
1990	Midnight Oil — "Blue Sky Mine"	Boom Crash Opera — "Onion Skin"; Max Q — "Sometimes"; Kylie Minogue — "Better the Devil You Know"
1991	Yothu Yindi — "Treaty (Filthy Lucre Mix)"	Crowded House — "Chocolate Cake"; Ratcat — "Don't Go Now"; Third Eye — "The Real Thing"
1992	Diesel — "Man Alive"	Boom Crash Opera — "Holy Water"; The Clouds — "Hieronymous"; Frente! — "Ordinary Angels"
1993	No award given	
1994	No award given	
1995	No award given	
1996	No award given	
1997	Silverchair — "Freak"	Human Nature — "Don't Say Goodbye"; Powderfinger — "Living Type"; Savage Garden — "To the Moon and Back"; Spiderbait — "Calypso"
1998	Kylie Minogue — "Did It Again"	Grinspoon — "Just Ace"; Natalie Imbruglia — "Torn"; Robyn Loau — "Sick with Love"; Regurgitator — "Black Bugs"; Screamfeeder — "Hi C's"; Silverchair — "Cemetery"
1999	Silverchair — "Anthem for the Year 2000"	Neil Finn — "Sinner"; The Living End — "Save the Day"; Powderfinger — "Already Gone"; Spiderbait — "Stevie"
2000	No award given	
2001	Paul Mac — "Just the Thing"	Aneiki — "Pleased to Meet You"; The Avalanches — "Since I Left You"; Fatt Dex (featuring MC Trey) — "Creepin'"; Superheist — "Step Back"
2002	Holly Valance — "Kiss Kiss"	1200 Techniques — "Karma"; GT — "(This Is Not a) Love Song"; Kylie Minogue — "Can't Get You Out of My Head"; Silverchair — "The Greatest View"
2003	Delta Goodrem — "Born to Try"	Amiel — "Lovesong"; Powderfinger — "(Baby I've Got You) On My Mind"; Rogue Traders — "One of My Kind"; The Vines — "Outtathaway!"

=== MTV Brasil ===
The International Viewer's Choice Award for MTV Brasil was given out every year from 1990 to 2003, thus becoming the longest-lasting International Viewer's Choice Award. From 1995 onwards, this award was incorporated into MTV Brasil's award ceremony, the MTV Video Music Brasil (VMB), as the Escolha da Audiência (Viewer's Choice). The award's biggest winner is the band Titãs, which earned three awards between 1990 and 2002. Three other bands are tied behind them for second place, all with two wins: Sepultura, Skank, and Charlie Brown Jr. Of these, though, Skank was the only one to achieve consecutive wins, taking home the awards for 1996 and 1997.

One of the main characteristics of the Brazilian Viewer's Choice award was that there was usually a large number of videos in the running for the award each year. The official VMA press releases, program books, and websites, though, usually only listed between four and six nominees (even omitting the eventual winner from these materials in 1991). Therefore, it is difficult to ascertain who was in fact nominated for this award between 1990 and 1995 (except perhaps for 1992), as it was not until 1996 that MTV Brasil ran video packages with all of the nominees during the award presentation at the VMBs. Still, from the information that is currently available, Os Paralamas do Sucesso and Engenheiros do Hawaii are tied as the most nominated acts for this category, each with ten nominations throughout the award's history (1990 to 2003).

Following is a list of the winners of the International Viewer's Choice Award for MTV Brasil.

Year	Winner	Other nominees
1990	Titãs — "Flores"	Djavan — "Oceano"; Engenheiros do Hawaii — "Alívio Imediato"; Os Paralamas do Sucesso — "Perplexo"; Caetano Veloso — "Estrangeiro"
1991	Sepultura — "Orgasmatron"	Cidade Negra — "Falar a Verdade"; Engenheiros do Hawaii — "Refrão de Bolero"; Kid Abelha — "Grand' Hotel"; Os Paralamas do Sucesso — "Caleidoscópio"
1992	Nenhum de Nós — "Ao Meu Redor"	Guilherme Arantes — "Taça de Veneno"; Biquini Cavadão — "Zé Ninguém"; Capital Inicial — "O Passageiro"; Djavan — "Se..."; Engenheiros do Hawaii — "O Exército de um Homem Só"; Gilberto Gil — "Madalena"; Marina — "Criança"; Marisa Monte — "Diariamente"; Os Paralamas do Sucesso — "Trac Trac"; RPM — "Gita"; Sepultura — "Desperate Cry"; Supla — "Só Pensa na Fama"; Titãs — "Saia de Mim"; Caetano Veloso — "Fora da Ordem"
1993	Titãs — "Será Que É Isso o Que Eu Necessito?"	Deborah Blando — "Decadence Avec Elegance"; Capital Inicial — "Kamikase"; Engenheiros do Hawaii — "Parabólica"; Nenhum de Nós — "Jornais"
1994	Sepultura — "Territory"	Chico Science — "A Cidade"; Legião Urbana — "Perfeição"; Raimundos — "Nêga Jurema"; Caetano Veloso and Gilberto Gil — "Haiti"
1995	Os Paralamas do Sucesso — "Uma Brasileira"	Barão Vermelho — "Daqui por Diante"; Marisa Monte — "Segue o Seco"; Nando Reis — "Me Diga"; Skank — "Te Ver"; Viper — "Coma Rage"
1996	Skank — "Garota Nacional"	Fernanda Abreu — "Veneno da Lata"; Baba Cósmica — "Sábado de Sol"; Barão Vermelho — "Vem Quente Que Eu Estou Fervendo"; Chico Science & Nação Zumbi — "Manguetown"; Engenheiros do Hawaii — "A Promessa"; Os Paralamas do Sucesso — "Lourinha Bombril"; Pato Fu — "Qualquer Bobagem"; Raimundos — "Eu Quero Ver o Oco"; Renato Russo — "Strani Amori"; Sepultura — "Roots Bloody Roots"; Titãs — "Eu Não Aguento"
1997	Skank — "É uma Partida de Futebol"	Fernanda Abreu — "Kátia Flávia, a Godiva do Irajá"; Angra — "Make Believe"; Baba Cósmica — "Uma Pedra no Meu Caminho"; Barão Vermelho — "Amor Meu Grande Amor"; Carlinhos Brown — "A Namorada"; Camisa de Vênus — "O Ponteiro Tá Subindo"; Cidade Negra — "Firmamento"; Kid Abelha — "Te Amo pra Sempre"; Lagoa — "Revista de Mulher Pelada"; Maria do Relento — "Conhece o Mário"; Nenhum de Nós — "Vou Deixar Que Você Se Vá"; Os Ostras — "Uma, Duas ou Três (Punheta)"; Os Paralamas do Sucesso — "La Bella Luna"; Pato Fu — "Água"; Planet Hemp — "Dezdasseis/Dig Dig Dig (Hempa)"; Raimundos — "Puteiro em João Pessoa"; Lulu Santos — "Aviso aos Navegantes"; Sepultura — "Ratamahatta"; Virgulóides — "Bagulho no Bumba"
1998	Racionais MC's — "Diário de um Detento"	Fernanda Abreu — "Jack Soul Brasileiro"; Barão Vermelho — "Puro Êxtase"; Biquini Cavadão — "Janaína"; Charlie Brown Jr. — "Proibida pra Mim"; Cidade Negra — "Realidade Virtual"; Claudinho e Buchecha — "Quero te Encontrar"; Daúde — "Pata Pata"; Engenheiros do Hawaii — "A Montanha"; Gabriel o Pensador — "Cachimbo da Paz"; Ira! — "Eu Não Sei (Can't Explain)"; Jota Quest — "Onibusfobia"; Maskavo Roots — "Djorous"; Os Paralamas do Sucesso — "Ela Disse Adeus"; Pato Fu — "Antes Que Seja Tarde"; Planet Hemp — "Adoled (The Ocean)"; Raimundos — "Andar na Pedra"; O Rappa — "Vapor Barato"; Lulu Santos — "Hyperconectividade"; Soulfly — "Bleed"
1999	Raimundos — "Mulher de Fases"	Banda Eva — "De Ladinho"; Barão Vermelho — "Por Você"; Capital Inicial — "O Mundo"; Charlie Brown Jr. — "Zóio de Lula"; Cidade Negra — "Já Foi"; Claudinho e Buchecha — "Só Love"; Engenheiros do Hawaii — "Eu Que Não Amo Você"; Jota Quest — "Sempre Assim"; Kid Abelha — "Eu Só Penso em Você"; Leonardo — "120, 150, 200 Km/h"; Nativus — "Liberdade pra Dentro da Cabeça"; Os Paralamas do Sucesso — "Depois da Queda o Coice"; Pato Fu — "Canção pra Você Viver Mais"; Pepê e Neném — "Mania de Você"; Sandy & Junior — "No Fundo do Coração"; SPC — "Sai da Minha Aba (Bicão)"; Skank — "Mandrake e os Cubanos"; Caetano Veloso — "Sozinho"; Vinny — "Shake Boom"
2000	O Rappa — "A Minha Alma (A Paz Que Eu Não Quero)"	Capital Inicial — "Eu Vou Estar"; Charlie Brown Jr. — "Confisco"; Engenheiros do Hawaii — "Negro Amor"; Gabriel o Pensador and Lulu Santos — "Astronauta"; Los Hermanos — "Anna Júlia"; Los Hermanos — "Primavera"; Maurício Manieri — "Bem Querer"; Daniela Mercury — "Ilê Pérola Negra"; Natiruts — "O Carcará e a Rosa"; Pato Fu — "Depois"; Penélope — "Holiday"; Raimundos — "A Mais Pedida"; Raimundos — "Me Lambe"; Raimundos — "Pompem"; O Rappa — "Me Deixa"; Rumbora — "Skaô"; Sandy & Junior — "Imortal"; Titãs — "Aluga-se"; Titãs — "Pelados em Santos"
2001	Charlie Brown Jr. — "Rubão, o Dono do Mundo"	Ana Carolina — "Quem de Nós Dois"; Adriana Calcanhotto — "Devolva-Me"; Wanessa Camargo — "O Amor Não Deixa"; Catedral — "Eu Amo Mais Você"; Patrícia Coelho — "O Meu Sangue Ferve por Você"; Cogumelo Plutão — "Esperando na Janela"; Falamansa — "Rindo à Toa/Xote dos Milagres"; Jota Quest — "O Que Eu Também Não Entendo"; KLB — "Ela Não Está Aqui"; Maurício Manieri — "Primavera"; Mary's Band — "Happy Birthday"; Os Paralamas do Sucesso — "Aonde Quer Que Eu Vá"; O Rappa — "O Que Sobrou do Céu"; Rumbora — "O Mapa da Mina"; Sandy & Junior — "A Lenda"; Skank — "Balada do Amor Inabalável"; Tihuana — "Que Vês?"; Twister — "40 Graus"; Jay Vaquer — "A Miragem"
2002	Titãs — "Epitáfio"	Arnaldo Antunes — "Essa Mulher"; Capital Inicial — "A Sua Maneira"; Charlie Brown Jr. — "Hoje Eu Acordei Feliz"; Cidade Negra — "Girassol"; CPM 22 — "Tarde de Outubro"; Engenheiros do Hawaii — "3^{a} do Plural"; Kelly Key — "Baba"; KLB — "Olhar 43"; Raimundos — "Sanidade"; O Rappa — "Instinto Coletivo"; Rodox — "Olhos Abertos"; Sandy & Junior — "O Amor Faz"; Skank — "Tanto"; Supla — "Garota de Berlim"; O Surto — "O Veneno"; Xis — "Chapa o Coco"
2003	Charlie Brown Jr. — "Papo Reto (Prazer É Sexo, o Resto É Negócio)"	B5 — "Matemática"; Wanessa Camargo — "Sem Querer"; Capital Inicial — "Quatro Vezes Você"; CPM 22 — "Desconfio"; Detonautas Roque Clube — "Quando o Sol Se For"; Engenheiros do Hawaii — "Até o Fim"; Frejat — "Eu Preciso Te Tirar do Sério"; Jota Quest — "Só Hoje"; Kelly Key — "Adoleta"; Kid Abelha — "Nada Sei (Apnéia)"; KLB — "Por Causa de Você"; Marcelo D2 — "Qual É?"; Os Paralamas do Sucesso — "Cuide Bem do Seu Amor"; Pitty — "Máscara"; Rouge — "Brilha la Luna"; Sepultura — "Bullet the Blue Sky"; Skank — "Dois Rios"; Tihuana — "Bote Fé"; Titãs — "Isso"; Tribalistas — "Já Sei Namorar"

=== MTV Canada ===
The International Viewer's Choice Award for MTV Canada was only given out once in 2002. Following is a list of the winners of the International Viewer's Choice Award for MTV Canada.

Year	Winner	Other nominees
2002	Nickelback — "Too Bad"	Choclair — "Light It Up"; Remy Shand — "Rocksteady"; Sloan — "If It Feels Good Do It"; Swollen Members — "Fuel Injected"

=== MTV China ===
The International Viewer's Choice Award for MTV China was only given out once in 2002, more-or-less replacing the MTV Mandarin Viewer's Choice Award. Following is a list of the winners of the International Viewer's Choice Award for MTV China.

Year	Winner	Other nominees
2002	Zheng Jun — "1/3 Dream"	Han Hong — "Awake"; Na Ying — "I Like You Only"; Sun Nan — "As Long as You Are Well"; Yu Quan — "The Train That Goes to Spring"

=== MTV Europe ===
The International Viewer's Choice Award for MTV Europe was given out every year from 1989 to 1997. This award was retired in 1998 and replaced with the regional categories handed out at that year's MTV Europe Music Awards. The award's biggest winners are Roxette and George Michael, both of whom won the award twice. The biggest nominee, meanwhile, is Icelandic singer Björk, who received three nominations (but came out empty-handed each year).

In terms of countries, Great Britain is by far the one with the most nominations and wins, followed by Sweden. Coincidentally, these are the only two countries to have produced multiple winners throughout the award's history, and they would have also been the only ones to produce winners had it not been for U2's win in 1995.

Because of the high crossover potential that European acts have in the U.S. market, several artists and videos received nominations for the European Viewer's Choice as well as other categories in the main ceremony, including Video of the Year and Viewer's Choice. One curious pattern to emerge from this is that until 1996 no European artist who won a Moonman during the main show ever won the European Viewer's Choice Moonman, namely Sinéad O'Connor in 1990, Annie Lennox in 1992, and Björk in 1996. By the same token, any European Viewer's Choice winners who were up for other awards that same night would lose their other main-show races, including George Michael in both 1993 and 1996 and U2 in 1995. This pattern was only broken in 1997—the award's last year—when The Prodigy's "Breathe" won the European Viewer's Choice award as well as the one voted for by U.S. audiences, thus also becoming the only video in the show's history to win the Viewer's Choice award in addition to an international one.

Another curious fact that can be attributed to the European Viewer's Choice award is that it led to the first case ever of a video being nominated in two different years, as Björk's "Human Behaviour" received a European nomination in 1993 and then six more the following year. This situation would not occur again until 2009, when Miley Cyrus's "7 Things" received a Best Editing nomination after having been nominated for Best New Artist the year before.

Following is a list of the winners of the International Viewer's Choice Award for MTV Europe.

Year	Winner	Other nominees
1989	Roxette — "The Look"	Front 242 — "Headhunter"; The Jeremy Days — "Brand New Toy"; Niagara — "Soleil d'Hiver"; Rainbirds — "Sea of Time"; Vaya con Dios — "Don't Cry for Louie"
1990	The Creeps — "Ooh I Like It"	Laid Back — "Bakerman"; Gary Moore — "Still Got the Blues (For You)"; Sinéad O'Connor — "Nothing Compares 2 U"
1991	Roxette — "Joyride"	EMF — "Unbelievable"; Pet Shop Boys — "Being Boring"; Seal — "Crazy"
1992	The Cure — "Friday I'm in Love"	Genesis — "I Can't Dance"; The KLF — "Justified & Ancient"; Annie Lennox — "Why"; Shakespears Sister — "Stay"
1993	George Michael — "Killer/Papa Was a Rollin' Stone"	The Beloved — "Sweet Harmony"; Björk — "Human Behaviour"; Peter Gabriel — "Digging in the Dirt"; Shakespears Sister — "Hello"
1994	Take That — "Babe"	The Cranberries — "Linger"; D:Ream — "Things Can Only Get Better"; Enigma — "Return to Innocence"; U2 — "Stay (Faraway, So Close!)"; Whale — "Hobo Humpin' Slobo Babe"
1995	U2 — "Hold Me, Thrill Me, Kiss Me, Kill Me"	Björk — "Army of Me"; Clawfinger — "Pin Me Down"; The Cranberries — "Zombie"; Oasis — "Whatever"
1996	George Michael — "Fastlove"	Björk — "It's Oh So Quiet"; Die Fantastischen Vier — "Sie Ist Weg"; Jovanotti — "L'Ombelico del Mondo"; Pulp — "Disco 2000"
1997	The Prodigy — "Breathe"	Daft Punk — "Around the World"; Jamiroquai — "Virtual Insanity"; Radiohead — "Paranoid Android"; Skunk Anansie — "Hedonism (Just Because You Feel Good)"

=== MTV India ===
The International Viewer's Choice Award for MTV India was given out every year from 1996 to 2001. Prior to that, viewers in India voted for the International Viewer's Choice Award for MTV Asia, even getting one of their artists, Indus Creed, chosen as the 1993 winner. In the year 2000, this award was divided into two distinct categories due to the popularity of music videos taken straight from Bollywood movies in MTV India: the International Viewer's Choice Award for MTV India (Hindi Pop) and the International Viewer's Choice Award for MTV India (Hindi Film).

Udit Narayan and Asha Bhosle are tied as the biggest winners in this category, each winning the award twice. In terms of nominations, meanwhile, Narayan is also the biggest nominee, having received a total of seven nominations throughout the award's history. Closely following behind him are Alka Yagnik with six nominations and Asha Bhosle with five. Following is a list of the winners of the International Viewer's Choice Award for MTV India.

Year	Category	Winner	Other nominees
1996	N/A	Colonial Cousins — "Sa Ni Dha Pa"	Asha Bhosle — "Piya Tu Ab To Aja"; Nazia Hassan — "Boom Boom (Remix)"; Indus Creed — "Sleep"; Shaan and Style Bhai — "Roop Tera Mastana"
1997	N/A	Asha Bhosle — "O Mere Sona Re"	Lucky Ali — "O Sanam"; Amitabh Bachchan — "Eir Bir Phatte"; Colonial Cousins — "Krishna"; Daler Mehndi — "Dardi Rab Rab"
1998	N/A	Lata Mangeshkar and Udit Narayan — "Dil To Pagal Hai"	Abhijeet — "Main Koi Aisa Geet"; Asha Bhosle — "Janam Samjha Karo"; Kamaal Khan — "O Oh Jaane Jana"; A. R. Rahman — "Maa Tujhe Salaam"
1999	N/A	A. R. Rahman — "Dil Se Re"	Shankar Mahadevan — "Breathless"; Sonu Nigam — "Ab Mujhe Raat Din"; Alka Yagnik and Udit Narayan — "Kuch Kuch Hota Hain"; Alka Yagnik and Udit Narayan — "Mera Mann"
2000	Hindi Film	Udit Narayan and Alka Yagnik — "Kaho Na Pyar Hai"	Asha Bhosle — "Rang De"; Suresh Peters and Mano — "Sailaru"; Kumar Sanu and Kavita Krishnamurthy — "Aankhon Ki Gustakiyan"; Anuradha Sriram, Sujatha, Sonu Nigam and A.R. Rahman — "Ishq Bina"
2000	Hindi Pop	Falguni Pathak — "Maine Payal Hai Chhankai"	Euphoria — "Mai Re"; Instant Karma — "Bahon Mein"; Sonu Nigam — "Tera Milna"; Shaan — "Tanha Dil"
2001	Hindi Film	Asha Bhosle, Sonu Nigam and Sukhwinder Singh — "Kambakth Ishq"	Sunidhi Chauhan, Jaspinder Narula and Shankar Mahadevan — "Bumbro"; Alka Yagnik and Udit Narayan — "Aaja Mahiya"; Alka Yagnik, Udit Narayan, Sukhwinder Singh and Srinivas — "Mitwa"; Alka Yagnik, Kumar Sanu and Udit Narayan — "Dil Ne Yeh Kaha Hain Dil Se"
2001	Hindi Pop	Sultan Khan and K. S. Chithra — "Piya Basanti"	Lucky Ali — "Tere Mere Saath"; Colonial Cousins — "Guiding Star"; Falguni Pathak — "Meri Chunar Udd Jaye"; Shubha Mudgal — "Mann Ke Manjeere"

=== MTV Internacional ===
The International Viewer's Choice Award for MTV Internacional was given out every year from 1989 to 1993, honoring the best Latin music video of the year. It was named after MTV Internacional, the syndicated Latin music-video show hosted by Daisy Fuentes. Unlike most other International Viewer's Choice awards, the MTV Internacional award was not restricted to a specific geographic region, but rather it rewarded the best video in Spanish played on the show. Thus, artists from European countries (such as France and Spain) who recorded mainly in Spanish managed to receive nominations during the award's history.

Despite the variety of artists who received multiple nominations for this award between 1989 and 1993, no artist (or country, for that matter) won this Moonman more than once. In 1994, this award was replaced by the International Viewer's Choice Award for MTV Latin America. Following is a list of the winners of the International Viewer's Choice Award for MTV Internacional.

Year	Winner	Other nominees
1989	Chayanne — "Este Ritmo Se Baila Así"	Emmanuel — "La Última Luna"; Gipsy Kings — "Djobi Djoba"; Miguel Mateos–ZAS — "Y, sin Pensar"; Fito Páez — "Sólo los Chicos"
1990	Gloria Estefan — "Oye Mi Canto"	Franco De Vita — "Louis"; Los Prisioneros — "Tren al Sur"; Soda Stereo — "En la Ciudad de la Furia"
1991	Franco De Vita — "No Basta"	Emmanuel — "Bella Señora"; Juan Luis Guerra y 440 — "A Pedir Su Mano"; Los Prisioneros — "Estrechez de Corazón"
1992	El General — "Muévelo"	Caifanes — "Nubes"; Gipsy Kings — "Baila Me"; Mecano — "El 7 de Septiembre"; El Último de la Fila — "Cuando el Mar Te Tenga"
1993	Luis Miguel — "América, América"	Café Tacuba — "María"; Juan Luis Guerra y 440 — "El Costo de la Vida"; Mecano — "Una Rosa Es una Rosa"

=== MTV Japan ===
The International Viewer's Choice Award for MTV Japan was given out from 1989 to 2001. Out of all of the International Viewer's Choice awards, MTV Japan's award had one of the most uneven histories. This award was not presented, for example, both in 1992 and 1993, despite the fact that MTV Japan had already launched again throughout Japan in 1992. After MTV Japan ceased airing in 1998, the Japanese Viewer's Choice Award was once again not presented in 1999 and 2000; it did, however, make its second (and last) return in 2001 for that year only. Following is a list of the winners of the International Viewer's Choice Award for MTV Japan.

Year	Winner	Other nominees
1989	Kome Kome Club — "Kome Kome War"	Kyosuke Himuro — "Angel"; Toshinobu Kubota — "Indigo Waltz"; Unicorn — "Daimeiwaku"
1990	Kome Kome Club — "Funk Fujiyama"	Yasuyuki Okamura — "Vegetable"; Jun Togawa — "Virgin Blues"; Mami Yamase — "Go!"
1991	Flipper's Guitar — "Groove Tube"	(no other nominees listed)
1992	No award given	
1993	No award given	
1994	hide — "Eyes Love You"	Chara — "Tsumibukako Aishiteyo"; Original Love — "The Rover"; Seikima-II — "Tatakau Nihonjin"; Izumi Tachibana — "Vanilla"
1995	Chage and Aska — "Something There"	Hal from Apollo '69 — "Sweet Thing"; The Mad Capsule Markets — "HI-SIDE (High-Individual Side)"; Towa Tei — "Technova"; TRF — "Overnight Sensation"
1996	Kuroyume — "Pistol"	Ken Ishii — "Extra"; Toshinobu Kubota — "Funk It Up"; The Mad Capsule Markets — "Walk!"; Seiko — "Let's Talk About It"
1997	Chara — "Yasashii Kimochi"	Air — "Hair Do"; Denki Groove — "Shangi-La"; Scha Dara Parr — "Otona Ni Nattemo"; The Yellow Monkey — "Rakuen"
1998	hide with Spread Beaver — "Pink Spider"	Blankey Jet City — "Akai Tanbarin"; Luna Sea — "Storm"; Puffy — "Ai no Shirushi"; Shikao Suga — "Story"
1999	No award given	
2000	No award given	
2001	Hikaru Utada — "Can You Keep a Secret?"	Chemistry — "Pieces of a Dream"; Gospellers — "Towa Ni"; L'Arc-en-Ciel — "Stay Away"; Misia — "Rhythm Reflection"

=== MTV Korea ===
The International Viewer's Choice Award for MTV Korea was given out every year from 1999 to 2001. Prior to that, Korean viewers voted for the International Viewer's Choice Award for MTV Asia, even getting one of their artists, Seo Taiji & Boys, chosen as the 1996 winner. Although there were no multiple winners during this award's brief history, singer Cho Sung Mo is the award's biggest nominee, receiving two nominations in three years. Two other nominated artists—Lee Seung-Hwan and H.O.T.—received nominations for the MTV Asia Viewer's Choice award before the Korean category was created. Following is a list of the winners of the International Viewer's Choice Award for MTV Korea.

Year	Winner	Other nominees
1999	H.O.T. — "Make a Line"	Cho Sung Mo — "To Heaven"; Jinusean — "Taekwon V"; No Brain — "Youth 98"; Shin Hae Chul — "Invitation to My Daily Life"; Yoo Seung Jun — "Burning Love"
2000	Clon — "The First Love"	Cho PD — "Fever"; Lee Jung Hyun — "Come"; Lee Soo Young — "I Believe"; S.E.S. — "Love"
2001	g.o.d — "Lie"	Cho Sung Mo — "Do You Know?"; Lee Seung Hwan — "Of You, for You"; Park Ji Yoon — "Adult Ceremony"; Position — "I Love You"

=== MTV Latin America ===
The International Viewer's Choice Award for MTV Latin America was given out every year from 1994 to 2002. In 1998, due to MTV Latin America's expansion and growing differences in musical tastes within areas of Latin America, this award was divided into two regions (North and South), each with its own set of nominees. Ironically, both regions continued to choose the same winner until the year 2000, when the Northern region chose Shakira (Colombia) as its winner while the Southern region chose Los Fabulosos Cadillacs (Argentina). The following year, 2001, the Latin Viewer's Choice Award was once again divided into three different regions, a division which carried on until 2002 when this award was last handed out (North, Central/Pacific, and South/Atlantic).

There is a five-way tie for the biggest winner record, as Café Tacuba, Molotov (both from Mexico), Ricky Martin (Puerto Rico), Los Fabulosos Cadillacs, and Shakira winning this award twice (with Molotov and Martin winning their awards in the same year for both regions of MTV Latin America). Meanwhile, the biggest nominees are Shakira, who received five nominations in two years, and La Ley (Chile), who received five nominations in four years. In terms of nominated videos, though, Los Fabulosos Cadillacs and La Ley hold the record, each with four different nominated videos throughout their careers.

Lastly, in terms of countries, both Argentina and Mexico are tied for first place with 25 nominations. Following is a list of the winners of the International Viewer's Choice Award for MTV Latin America.

Year	Region	Winner	Other nominees
1994	N/A	Los Fabulosos Cadillacs — "Matador"	Caifanes — "Afuera"; La Ley — "Tejedores de Ilusión"; Mano Negra — "El Señor Matanza"
1995	N/A	Café Tacuba — "La Ingrata"	Fito Páez — "Circo Beat"; Santana — "Luz Amor y Vida"; Todos Tus Muertos — "Mate"; Los Tres — "Déjate Caer"
1996	N/A	Soda Stereo — "Ella Usó Mi Cabeza Como un Revólver"	Los Fabulosos Cadillacs — "Mal Bicho"; Illya Kuryaki and the Valderramas — "Abarajame"; Maldita Vecindad y los Hijos del 5to. Patio — "Don Palabras"; Eros Ramazzotti — "La Cosa Más Bella"
1997	N/A	Café Tacuba — "Chilanga Banda"	Azul Violeta — "Volveré a Empezar"; Control Machete — "¿Comprendes Mendes?; Fito Páez — "Cadáver Exquisito"; Aleks Syntek y la Gente Normal — "Sin Ti"
1998	North	Molotov — "Gimme Tha Power"	Aterciopelados — "Cosita Seria"; Illya Kuryaki and the Valderramas — "Jugo"; La Ley — "Fotofobia"; Plastilina Mosh — "Mr. P. Mosh"
1998	South	Molotov — "Gimme Tha Power"	Andrés Calamaro — "Loco"; Los Fabulosos Cadillacs — "Calaveras y Diablitos"; Illya Kuryaki and the Valderramas — "Jugo"; Turf — "Casanova"
1999	North	Ricky Martin — "Livin' la Vida Loca"	Bersuit Vergarabat — "Sr. Cobranza"; Café Tacuba — "Revés"; Control Machete — "Sí, Señor"; Molotov — "El Carnal de las Estrellas"
1999	South	Ricky Martin — "Livin' la Vida Loca"	Los Auténticos Decadentes — "Los Piratas"; Miguel Mateos — "Bar Imperio"; Molotov — "El Carnal de las Estrellas"; Los Pericos — "Sin Cadenas"
2000	North	Shakira — "Ojos Así"	Jumbo — "Siento Que"; La Ley — "Aquí"; Mœnia — "Manto Estelar"; Aleks Syntek — "Tú Necesitas"
2000	South	Los Fabulosos Cadillacs — "La Vida"	Gustavo Cerati — "Paseo Inmoral"; Illya Kuryaki and the Valderramas — "Coolo"; Shakira — "Ojos Así"; Diego Torres — "Donde Van"
2001	North	Alejandro Sanz — "El Alma al Aire"	Control Machete (featuring Ely Guerra) — "Amores Perros (De Perros Amores)"; Genitallica — "Imagina"; La Ley — "Fuera de Mí"; Paulina Rubio — "Y Yo Sigo Aquí"
2001	Central	Dracma — "Hijo de Puta"	Chancho en Piedra — "Eligiendo una Reina"; La Ley — "Fuera de Mí"; Paulina Rubio — "Y Yo Sigo Aquí"; Stereo 3 — "Atrévete a Aceptarlo"
2001	South	Catupecu Machu — "Y Lo Que Quiero Es Que Pises sin el Suelo"	Natalia Oreiro — "Tu Veneno"; Fito Páez — "El Diablo de Tu Corazón"; Paulina Rubio — "Y Yo Sigo Aquí"; Alejandro Sanz — "El Alma al Aire"
2002	North	Shakira — "Suerte"	Enrique Iglesias — "Héroe"; Juanes — "A Dios le Pido"; Jumbo — "Cada Vez Que Me Voy"; Celso Piña (featuring Control Machete and Blanquito Man) — "Cumbia sobre el Rio"; Paulina Rubio — "Si Tú Te Vas"
2002	Pacific	Juanes — "A Dios le Pido"	Enrique Iglesias — "Héroe"; Javiera y Los Imposibles — "Maldita Primavera"; Nicole — "Viaje Infinito"; Stereo 3 — "Amanecer sin Ti"; Shakira — "Suerte"
2002	Atlantic	Diego Torres — "Color Esperanza"	Babasónicos — "El Loco"; Érica García — "Positiva"; Enrique Iglesias — "Escapar"; Juanes — "A Dios le Pido"; Shakira — "Suerte"

=== MTV Mandarin ===
The International Viewer's Choice Award for MTV Mandarin was given out every year from 1995 to 2001, honoring the best music video of the year by a Mandarin artist from China, Taiwan, Hong Kong, or Singapore (and occasionally Mandarin-speaking artists from Japan and Malaysia received nominations). Prior to that, voters from the region voted for the International Viewer's Choice Award for MTV Asia, even making one of its artists, Cui Jian, the first-ever winner of such award. In 2002, this award was more-or-less replaced by the International Viewer's Choice Award for MTV China.

No artist won this award more than once despite its relative longevity in relation to the other international categories. Furthermore, several artists are tied as the biggest nominees, each with two nominations: Jeff Chang, Valen Hsu, Karen Mok, Faye Wong, and David Tao. Following is a list of the winners of the International Viewer's Choice Award for MTV Mandarin.

Year	Winners	Other nominees
1995	Faye Wong — "Chess"	Dou Wei — "The Black Dream"; Dadawa — "Sister Drum"; Tracy Huang — "Spring"; Xin Xiao Qi — "Understanding"
1996	Nana Tang — "Freedom"	Dou Wei — "Outside the Window"; Andy Lau — "Truly Forever"; Eric Moo — "Love Is So Heavy"; Regina Tseng — "From Dark to Light"
1997	Mavis Fan — "Bartender Angel"	Jeff Chang — "Affection"; Chyi Chin — "Cliff"; Valen Hsu — "If Cloud Knows"; Aaron Kwok — "Share My Love"; Wu Bai & China Blue — "End of Love"
1998	Coco Lee — "Di Da Di"	Black Biscuits — "Stamina"; Karen Mok — "He Doesn't Love Me"; Na Ying — "Conquer"; Power Station — "Cruel Love Letter"; David Tao — "Beside the Airport"
1999	Shino Lin — "Irritated"	Chau Wa-Kin — "Someone with a Story"; Valen Hsu — "Don't Say Goodbye"; Faye Wong — "Quitting in Halfway"; Harlem Yu and Jeff Chang — "Love Turning Around"; Zhang Chen-Yu — "I Want Money"; Zheng Jun — "Happiness"
2000	David Tao — "Find Myself"	Cheer Chen — "Still Be Lonely"; Kelly Chen — "Love You Love Me"; Ho Xiang Tin — "The Tears for You"; David Huang — "Love Stopped Since Last Night"; May Lan — "Running Wild"; Faith Yang — "Hold Still"
2001	Jolin Tsai — "Fall in Love with a Street"	Jacky Cheung — "Complain for Reason"; Gigi Leung — "The Price of Love"; Liang Jing Ru — "Courage"; Karen Mok — "Lazy to Bother"; Sticky Rice — "Taekwondo"; Stefanie Sun — "The Happiness That I Need"; Nicholas Tse — "Jade Butterfly"; Leehom Wang — "Son of Dragon"; Zhang Hui Mei — "One Night Stand"

=== MTV Russia ===
The International Viewer's Choice Award for MTV Russia was given out every year from 1999 to 2001. This award was singular in its first year for nominating three Russian artists along with three foreign, English-speaking artists. In 2000 and 2001, though, the number of nominees was reduced to three and only Russian artists were nominated. Rock group Mumiy Troll stands as the category's biggest nominee, having received nominations for it all three years that the award was given out (though coming out empty-handed every single time).

Most peculiarly, though, the award's first presentation in 1999 created a unique situation in VMA history, as it marked the first time that an artist won more than one International Viewer's Choice. In fact, Ricky Martin won three Viewer's Choice awards that year (though two were for Latin America) and was also in the running for a fourth one (the American one), which was another first. Following is a list of the winners of the International Viewer's Choice Award for MTV Russia.

Year	Winner	Other nominees
1999	Ricky Martin — "Livin' la Vida Loca"	Linda — "Otpusti Menyia"; Mumiy Troll — "Ranetka"; The Offspring — "Pretty Fly (for a White Guy)"; Otpetye Moshenniki — "Lyubi Menia, Lyubi"; Britney Spears — "...Baby One More Time"
2000	Detsl — "Vecherinka"	Chicherina — "Zhara"; Mumiy Troll — "Bez Obmana"
2001	t.A.T.u. — "Ya Soshla S Uma"	Alsou — "Before You Love Me"; Mumiy Troll — "Moya Pevitsa"

=== MTV Southeast Asia ===
The International Viewer's Choice Award for MTV Southeast Asia was given out every year from 1999 to 2001. After MTV Korea received its own separate Viewer's Choice Award in 1999, the only countries left in MTV Asia were Indonesia, Malaysia, Thailand, and the Philippines; and the channel for those countries was thus renamed MTV Southeast Asia. Following is a list of the winners of the International Viewer's Choice Award for MTV Southeast Asia.

Year	Winner	Other nominees
1999	Parokya ni Edgar — "Harana"	Mai Charoenpura — "Mai Han Pen Rai"; Krisdayanti — "Menghitung Hari"; Poetic Ammo — "Everything Changes"
2000	Ahmad Dhani and Andra Ramadhan — "Kuldesak"	Bazoo — "Pee Fa Party"; Jason Lo — "Evening News"; Truefaith — "(Awit Para) Sa Kanya"
2001	Kyla — "Hanggang Ngayon"	Black Maria — "Veto"; Dome — "Pa Lao"; Naif — "Posessif"
