= 1992 MTV Video Music Awards =

Award ceremony

- Date: Wednesday, September 9, 1992
- Location: Pauley Pavilion, Los Angeles
- Country: United States
- Hosted by: Dana Carvey
- Most awards: Van Halen & Red Hot Chili Peppers (3)
- Most nominations: Red Hot Chili Peppers (9)

Television/radio coverage
- Network: MTV
- Produced by: Doug Herzog; Judy McGrath; Gregory Sills
- Directed by: Bruce Gowers

The 1992 MTV Video Music Awards aired live on September 9, 1992, honoring the best music videos from June 16, 1991, to June 15, 1992. The show was hosted by Dana Carvey at UCLA's Pauley Pavilion in Los Angeles.

The night's biggest winners were Van Halen and the Red Hot Chili Peppers, as each group earned three moonmen that night. Particularly, Van Halen's video for "Right Now" took home the main award of the night, Video of the Year, and received seven nominations, making it the most nominated video of the night. The Red Hot Chili Peppers, meanwhile, won the award for Viewer's Choice and received a total of nine nominations for two of their videos, becoming the most nominated act of the night. Six of the Peppers' nominations were for "Give It Away", and the remaining three went to "Under the Bridge".

The show was notable for a feud between Axl Rose and members of Nirvana as well as Courtney Love. It began backstage before the awards show, when Love jokingly offered to make Rose the godfather of Frances Bean Cobain. Rose threatened Cobain, telling him to quiet his wife, and barbs were exchanged between Love and Rose's then-girlfriend Stephanie Seymour. Bassists Krist Novoselic and Duff McKagan almost came to blows over the incident, just before Nirvana were to take the stage. The spat went public onstage immediately after Nirvana's performance of "Lithium", as drummer Dave Grohl taunted Rose. Cobain then raised the dispute in post-show interviews at the VMA.

Along with Nirvana and Guns N' Roses, the night's performers included the likes of Bryan Adams, Def Leppard, En Vogue, the Red Hot Chili Peppers, Pearl Jam, and Eric Clapton, among others. Also, there was a special performance by U2 via satellite, with host Dana Carvey playing the drums for them from the Pauley Pavilion. English band The Cure was slated to perform, but had to cancel their appearance, citing illness and exhaustion.

== Background ==
MTV announced on June 23 that the 1992 Video Music Awards would be held on September 9 at UCLA's Pauley Pavilion and hosted by Dana Carvey. MTV cited the abilities to expand the number of performances and the size of the audience as reasons for moving to the Pauley Pavilion. Nominees were announced at a press conference held on July 7. In an effort to raise the energy of the ceremony, MTV increased the number of tickets available to the general public from 1,000 to 6,000. MTV also claimed that the ceremony was the first Video Music Awards to be completely live with no pre-recorded music. Over 18 animated shorts was featured in the nomination packages, which were reused by the animated showcase Liquid Television. The ceremony broadcast was preceded by the 1992 MTV Video Music Awards Opening Act hosted by Kurt Loder, Tabitha Soren, John Norris, and Cindy Crawford.

== Performances ==
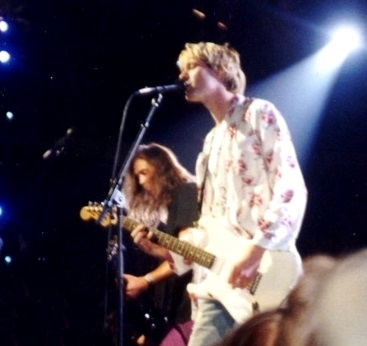
Kurt Cobain (front) and Krist Novoselic of Nirvana performing at the 1992 MTV Video Music Awards.

List of musical performances in order of appearance
Artist(s)	Song(s)	Ref.
The Black Crowes	"Remedy"	
Bobby Brown	"Humpin' Around"	
U2; Dana Carvey (as Garth Algar)	"Even Better Than the Real Thing" (Note: U2 performed live via satellite from Pontiac, Michigan, while Carvey accompanied on drums from the ceremony venue in character as Garth from Wayne's World)	
Def Leppard	"Let's Get Rocked"	
Nirvana	"Rape Me" (intro) "Lithium"	
Elton John	"The One"	
Pearl Jam	"Jeremy"	
Red Hot Chili Peppers	"Under the Bridge" (intro) "Give It Away"	
Michael Jackson	"Black or White" (Note: from his Dangerous Tour in London)	
Bryan Adams	"Do I Have to Say the Words?"	
En Vogue	"Free Your Mind"	
Eric Clapton	"Tears in Heaven"	
Guns N' Roses; Elton John	"November Rain"	

== Presenters ==
=== Pre-show ===
- Kurt Loder and Cindy Crawford – introduced the winners of the professional categories
- John Norris – presented Best Dance Video

=== Main show ===
- Eddie Murphy – presented Best Male Video
- Dana Carvey (as Johnny Carson) and Phil Hartman (as Ed McMahon) – appeared in Viewer's Choice Award vignettes
- John Corbett and Shannen Doherty – presented Best Direction in a Video
- David Spade, Andrew Dice Clay, Doug Bradley (as "Pinhead") and Ringo Starr – appeared in a series of vignettes at the 'talent check-in' table
- Ice-T and Metallica (Lars Ulrich and Kirk Hammett) – presented Best Rap Video
- Denis Leary – appeared in pre-recorded segments about what was 'coming up' on the show
- Halle Berry and Jean-Claude Van Damme – presented Best Video from a Film
- Marky Mark and Vanessa Williams – presented Breakthrough Video
- Roger Taylor and Brian May – presented the Video Vanguard Award
- Luke Perry and Howard Stern (as "Fartman") – presented Best Metal/Hard Rock Video
- VJs Angela Chow (Asia), Richard Wilkins (Australia), Cuca Lazarotto (Brasil), Ray Cokes (Europe) and Daisy Fuentes (Internacional) – announced their respective region's Viewer's Choice winner
- Denis Leary and Cindy Crawford – presented Viewer's Choice
- Kris Kross and Magic Johnson – presented Best Female Video
- Dana Carvey – presented Best Alternative Video
- Boyz II Men and Wilson Phillips – presented Best New Artist in a Video
- Peter Gabriel and Annie Lennox – presented Best Group Video
- Mick Jagger – presented Video of the Year

== Winners and nominations ==
Winners, except for the Viewer's Choice awards, were selected by a panel of approximately 700 members of the music industry.

Winners are in bold text.

Video of the Year	Best Male Video
**Van Halen – "Right Now"**; Def Leppard – "Let's Get Rocked"; Nirvana – "Smells Like Teen Spirit"; Red Hot Chili Peppers – "Under the Bridge"	**Eric Clapton – "Tears in Heaven" (Performance)**; John Mellencamp – "Get a Leg Up"; Tom Petty and the Heartbreakers – "Into the Great Wide Open"; Bruce Springsteen – "Human Touch"; "Weird Al" Yankovic – "Smells Like Nirvana"
Best Female Video	Best Group Video
**Annie Lennox – "Why"**; Tori Amos – "Silent All These Years"; Madonna – "Holiday" (Truth or Dare version); Vanessa Williams – "Save the Best for Last"	**U2 – "Even Better Than the Real Thing"**; En Vogue – "My Lovin' (You're Never Gonna Get It)"; Red Hot Chili Peppers – "Under the Bridge"; Van Halen – "Right Now"
Best New Artist in a Video	Best Metal/Hard Rock Video
**Nirvana – "Smells Like Teen Spirit"**; Tori Amos – "Silent All These Years"; Arrested Development – "Tennessee"; Cracker – "Teen Angst (What the World Needs Now)"	**Metallica – "Enter Sandman"**; Def Leppard – "Let's Get Rocked"; Ugly Kid Joe – "Everything About You"; Van Halen – "Right Now"
Best Rap Video	Best Dance Video
**Arrested Development – "Tennessee"**; Black Sheep – "The Choice Is Yours (Revisited)"; Kris Kross – "Jump"; Marky Mark and the Funky Bunch – "Good Vibrations"; Sir Mix-a-Lot – "Baby Got Back"	**Prince and the New Power Generation – "Cream"**; En Vogue – "My Lovin' (You're Never Gonna Get It)"; Madonna – "Holiday (Truth or Dare version)"; Marky Mark and the Funky Bunch – "Good Vibrations"
Best Alternative Video	Best Video from a Film
**Nirvana – "Smells Like Teen Spirit"**; Pearl Jam – "Alive"; Red Hot Chili Peppers – "Give It Away"; The Soup Dragons – "Divine Thing"	**Queen – "Bohemian Rhapsody" (from Wayne's World)**; Eric Clapton – "Tears in Heaven" (from Rush); The Commitments – "Try a Little Tenderness" (from The Commitments); Hammer – "Addams Groove" (from The Addams Family)
Breakthrough Video	Best Direction in a Video
**Red Hot Chili Peppers – "Give It Away"**; Tori Amos – "Silent All These Years"; David Byrne – "She's Mad"; Van Halen – "Right Now"	**Van Halen – "Right Now" (Director: Mark Fenske)**; En Vogue – "My Lovin' (You're Never Gonna Get It)" (Director: Matthew Rolston); Red Hot Chili Peppers – "Give It Away" (Director: Stéphane Sednaoui); Sir Mix-a-Lot – "Baby Got Back" (Director: Adam Bernstein)
Best Choreography in a Video	Best Special Effects in a Video
**En Vogue – "My Lovin' (You're Never Gonna Get It)" (Choreographers: Frank Gatson, Travis Payne and LaVelle Smith Jr.)**; Hammer – "2 Legit 2 Quit" (Choreographer: Hammer); Madonna – "Holiday (Truth or Dare version)" (Choreographer: Vincent Paterson); Marky Mark and the Funky Bunch – "Good Vibrations" (Choreographers: Marky Mark and the Funky Bunch)	**U2 – "Even Better Than the Real Thing" (Special Effects: Simon Taylor)**; David Byrne – "She's Mad" (Special Effects: Carlos Arguello and Michele Ferrone); Def Leppard – "Let's Get Rocked" (Special Effects: Ian Pearson); Michael Jackson – "Black or White (Short Version)" (Special Effects: Jamie Dixon)
Best Art Direction in a Video	Best Editing in a Video
**Red Hot Chili Peppers – "Give It Away" (Art Directors: Nick Goodman and Robertino Mazati)**; Guns N' Roses – "November Rain" (Art Director: Nigel Phelps); Sir Mix-a-Lot – "Baby Got Back" (Art Director: Dan Hubp); Rod Stewart – "Broken Arrow" (Art Director: José Montaño)	**Van Halen – "Right Now" (Editor: Mitchell Sinoway)**; En Vogue – "My Lovin' (You're Never Gonna Get It)" (Editor: Robert Duffy); Metallica – "Enter Sandman" (Editor: Jay Torres); Red Hot Chili Peppers – "Give It Away" (Editors: Veronique Labels and Olivier Gajan); U2 – "Even Better Than the Real Thing" (Editor: Jerry Chater)
Best Cinematography in a Video	Viewer's Choice
**Guns N' Roses – "November Rain" (Directors of Photography: Mike Southon and Daniel Pearl)**; Tori Amos – "Silent All These Years" (Director of Photography: George Tiffin); Eric Clapton – "Tears in Heaven (Performance)" (Director of Photography: David Johnson); En Vogue – "My Lovin' (You're Never Gonna Get It)" (Director of Photography: Paul Lauter); Genesis – "I Can't Dance" (Director of Photography: Daniel Pearl); Michael Jackson – "In the Closet" (Director of Photography: Rolf Kestermann); Madonna – "Holiday (Truth or Dare version)" (Director of Photography: Toby Phillips); Marky Mark and the Funky Bunch – "Good Vibrations" (Director of Photography: Dave Phillips); Metallica – "Enter Sandman" (Director of Photography: Martin Coppen); Red Hot Chili Peppers – "Give It Away" (Director of Photography: Marco Mazzei); Vanessa Williams – "Running Back to You" (Director of Photography: Ralph Ziman)	**Red Hot Chili Peppers – "Under the Bridge"**; Def Leppard – "Let's Get Rocked"; Nirvana – "Smells Like Teen Spirit"; Van Halen – "Right Now"
International Viewer's Choice: MTV Asia	International Viewer's Choice: MTV Australia
**Christina – "Jing Mai Klua"**; Artists R.A.P. (Roslan Aziz Productions) – "Ikhlas Tapi Jauh"; Chang Yu-sheng – "Take Me to the Moon"; The Dawn – "Iisang Bangka Tayo"; Lo Ta-yu – "Story of the Train"; Marsha – "Taak-Hak"	**Diesel – "Man Alive"**; Boom Crash Opera – "Holy Water"; The Clouds – "Hieronymous"; Frente! – "Ordinary Angels"
International Viewer's Choice: MTV Brasil	International Viewer's Choice: MTV Europe
**Nenhum de Nós – "Ao Meu Redor"**; Guilherme Arantes – "Taça de Veneno"; Biquini Cavadão – "Zé Ninguém"; Capital Inicial – "O Passageiro"; Djavan – "Se..."; Engenheiros do Hawaii – "O Exército de um Homem Só"; Gilberto Gil – "Madalena"; Marina – "Criança"; Marisa Monte – "Diariamente"; Os Paralamas do Sucesso – "Trac Trac"; RPM – "Gita"; Sepultura – "Desperate Cry"; Supla – "Só Pensa na Fama"; Titãs – "Saia de Mim"; Caetano Veloso – "Fora da Ordem"	**The Cure – "Friday I'm in Love"**; Genesis – "I Can't Dance"; The KLF – "Justified & Ancient"; Annie Lennox – "Why"; Shakespears Sister – "Stay"
International Viewer's Choice: MTV Internacional	
**El General – "Muévelo"**; Caifanes – "Nubes"; Gipsy Kings – "Baila Me"; Mecano – "El 7 de Septiembre"; El Último de la Fila – "Cuando el Mar Te Tenga"
Michael Jackson Video Vanguard Award
**Guns N' Roses**

== Artists with multiple wins and nominations ==
Artists who received multiple awards
Wins	Artist
3	Red Hot Chili Peppers
3	Van Halen
2	Guns N' Roses
2	Nirvana
2	U2

Artists who received multiple nominations
Nominations	Artist
9	Red Hot Chili Peppers
7	Van Halen
6	En Vogue
4	Def Leppard
4	Madonna
4	Marky Mark and the Funky Bunch
4	Nirvana
4	Tori Amos
3	Eric Clapton
3	Metallica
3	Sir Mix-a-Lot
3	U2
2	Annie Lennox
2	Arrested Development
2	David Byrne
2	Genesis
2	Guns N' Roses
2	Michael Jackson
2	Hammer
2	Vanessa Williams

== Music Videos with multiple wins and nominations ==
Music Videos that received multiple awards
Wins	Artist	Music Video
3	Van Halen	"Right Now"
2	Nirvana	"Smells Like Teen Spirit"
2	Red Hot Chili Peppers	"Give It Away"
2	U2	"Even Better Than the Real Thing"

Music Videos that received multiple nominations
Nominations	Artist	Music Video
7	Van Halen	"Right Now"
6	En Vogue	"My Lovin' (You're Never Gonna Get It)"
6	Red Hot Chili Peppers	"Give It Away"
4	Def Leppard	"Let's Get Rocked"
4	Madonna	"Holiday" (Truth or Dare version)
4	Marky Mark and the Funky Bunch	"Good Vibrations"
4	Nirvana	"Smells Like Teen Spirit"
4	Tori Amos	"Silent All These Years"
3	Eric Clapton	"Tears in Heaven"
3	Metallica	"Enter Sandman"
3	Red Hot Chili Peppers	"Under the Bridge"
3	Sir Mix-a-Lot	"Baby Got Back"
3	U2	"Even Better Than the Real Thing"
2	Annie Lennox	"Why"
2	Arrested Development	"Tennessee"
2	David Byrne	"She's Mad"
2	Genesis	"I Can't Dance"
2	Guns N' Roses	"November Rain"
