= Vaquer =

Vaquer is a surname that originated in a few countries, including Spain and France. In Spain, the surname "Vaquer" could be associated with the Catalan or Occitan languages, where it might have occupational or toponymic origins related to the term "vaquer" which means "cowboy". In France, the surname "Vaquer" could have regional origins and meanings, potentially linked to similar linguistic roots.

Today, the Balearic Islands has the highest density of people with the surname "Vaquer", where it is the 227th most common surname. The surname "Vaquer" can also be found in mainland Spain, France, Italy, Argentina, the United States and other countries.

People with the surname include:

- Gabriela Vaquer (born 1990), Puerto Rican footballer
- Jay Vaquer (born 1975), Brazilian singer-songwriter
- Oliver Vaquer, American actor
- Stephanie Vaquer (born 1993), Chilean professional wrestler
