= Sarvi Kalhor =

English singer

Sarvi Kalhor (born 27 December 1988 in London), known professionally as Sarvi, is an English singer. She attended the Sylvia Young Theatre School. In early 2011, Sarvi's debut single "Dj's Bringing Me Back To Life" went to number 32 in the UK Club Charts and introduced her to the world's dance scene. Her second single "Stereo Love" produced by Andrew Lane reached the Top Ten, in the UK Club Charts, in August 2011 and was broadcast across the USA. Paul Boyd shot the video for Stereo Love in Los Angeles. Sarvi followed this with her third single "Amore" which reached number 1 in the UK's Upfront Club Charts on 15 December 2011. "Amore" has been Remixed by DJ Chuckie, the UK's Seamus Haji, Steve Smart and WestFunk. Sarvi is signed to independent label: Goldrock Music.
