= Alsou =

Russian singer (born 1983)

Alsou Алсу
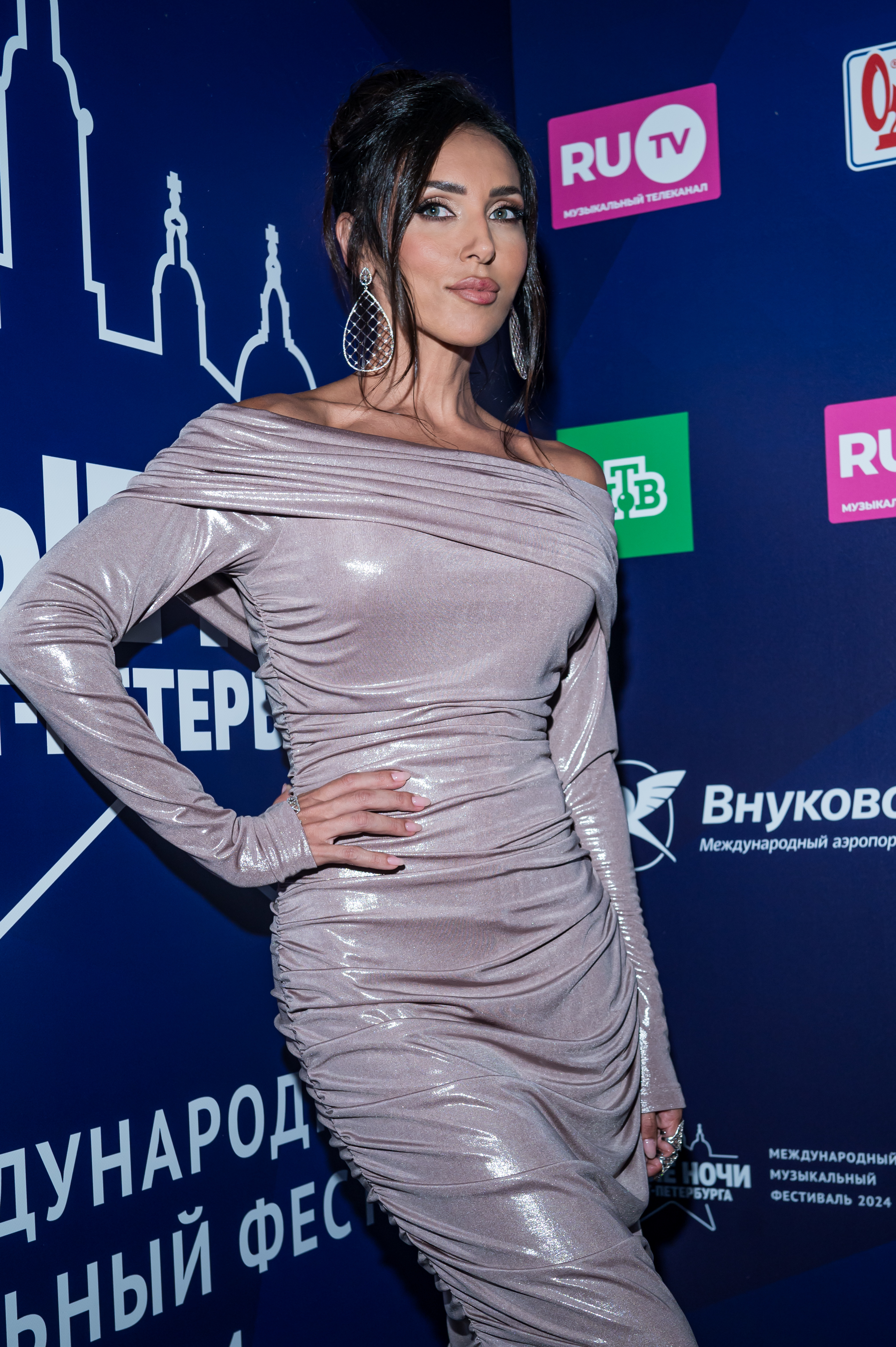
- Alsou in 2024

Background information
- Born: 27 June 1983 (age 43); Bugulma, Tatar ASSR, Russian SFSR, Soviet Union
- Origin: Moscow, Russia
- Genres: Pop, R&B, synthpop
- Occupation: Singer
- Years active: 1998–present
- Label: Universal Music

Alsou Ralifovna Abramova (Russian: Алсу́ Рали́фовна Абра́мова; Tatar: Алсу Рәлиф кызы Абрамова; née Safina; born 27 June 1983), known professionally as Alsou, is a Russian singer. She represented Russia in the Eurovision Song Contest 2000 in which she came second with the song "Solo" right after Denmark, giving her recognition across Europe. Alsou hosted the final of the Eurovision Song Contest 2009 held in Moscow. She was given the Merited Artist of the Russia award in 2018.

== Biography ==
=== Early life ===
Alsou was born in Bugulma, Tatar ASSR, Russian SFSR, Soviet Union. Her father, Ralif Rafilovich Safin, who is of Bashkir descent, is a former LUKoil executive and a current member of the Federal Council, the upper chamber of the Russian parliament. He is also the owner of the FC Zhemchuzhina-Sochi football team and was named the 100th richest citizen of Russia by Forbes magazine in 2004. Alsou's mother, Raziya Iskhakovna, is an architect of Volga Tatar descent. Alsou is a Muslim. She has an older half-brother called Ruslan (1973), an older brother called Marat (1977, not to be confused with tennis player Marat Safin), and a younger brother called Renard (1996).

When Alsou was one year old, her family moved from Bugulma to Siberia. At age five, Alsou asked her parents for a piano. She was then allowed to attend a private music school. After living in Moscow due to her father's business, she then moved to Syosset, New York, and later to the UK where she entered a private architecture college. While living in London, Alsou visited Russia often.

In 1998, at the wedding of her brother Marat which was celebrated on the bank of the Moskva River, Alsou sat at the grand piano and sang I Will Always Love You. After this private performance, her family began to persuade her to pursue a professional singing career.

=== Later life ===
On 18 March 2006 Alsou married Yan Abramov, an Azerbaijani-born Jewish businessman. The wedding reception took place at Rossiya Hotel.

On 7 September 2006, Alsou gave birth to her first daughter Safina at the Cedars-Sinai Medical Center in Los Angeles, California. In 2007 Alsou joined the United Russia party. On 29 April 2008, Alsou gave birth to her second daughter Mikella at Tel Aviv Sourasky Medical Center. On 10 August 2016, Alsou gave birth to her son, Rafael, at the Ihilov hospital in Tel-Aviv. On 24 May 2024 Alsou filed for divorce. In August 2024 the divorce was finalized.

== Career ==
=== Beginning ===
At the age of 15 Alsou was introduced to music manager Valeriy Belotserkovskiy. She again performed "I Will Always Love You" and impressed the manager. He began work with Alsou the next day. Her debut Russian album was the self-titled Alsou (Russian: Алсу́) was released on 16 September 1999. It was very successful in Russia and spawned 3 singles: "Zimniy Son" ("Winter Dream") "Vesna" ("Spring"), and "Inogda" ("Sometimes"). After the huge success of Alsou's debut Russian album she was signed to Universal Music Russia and became its first domestic artist. By 2000 more than 700.000 legal copies of CD Alsou were sold in Russia.

In 2000, Alsou recorded her first English language single "Solo" and was entered into the Eurovision Song Contest 2000, written by Andrew Lane and Brandon Barnes eventually finishing second overall. "Solo" went on to sell 100,000 copies and became the biggest-selling single of all time in Russia, surpassed only by her next single, a duet with Enrique Iglesias entitled "You're My #1". ` I really enjoyed performing with him in Kremlin and I hope our paths will cross again`.

After her success in Eurovision 2000, Alsou began a large-scale tour of Russia. She celebrated her 17th birthday by performing in her native town of Bugulma, where 86,000 of the 120,000 population gathered in the main square to see her.

Alsou performed "Solo" again at Congratulations, the 50th anniversary Eurovision concert in Copenhagen, Denmark, in October 2005.

=== English career ===
During 2000–2001, Alsou began working on her debut English album also called Alsou, which was released in Russia on 28 June 2001. It was also released in (Germany), Norway, Poland, the Czech Republic and Malaysia.

The lead single "Before You Love Me" was released in the UK on 30 April 2001, soon after charting at No. 1 on MTV Select and several TV appearances by Alsou. However, it only managed to chart at No. 27 in the UK Singles Chart. Later that year it was released in Germany and Australia.

A follow-up single, "He Loves Me", was released only in (Germany) on 15 October 2001, with limited success.

The album was canceled in the UK, though released from 2001–2002 in several European countries and Malaysia.

=== Between number albums ===
Alsou's debut Russian album was re-released twice – in 2001 and 2002, spawning two singles – "Osen" ("Autumn") and "Kogda Lubov Ko Mne Pridiot" ("When Love Comes To Me").

In the summer of 2002, Alsou began a tour of the former Soviet countries. Her new video for an upcoming single "Letyashaya Nad Oblakami" ("Flying Over The Clouds") was shown in Russian cinemas before the Russian romantic movie Atlantida. Alsou had recorded two songs for the movie.

=== Trilogy and 19 ===
In August 2002 more studio sessions began for a second Russian long-play. Alsou was also preparing for her concerts in Moscow at the same time. The "Trilogy" project was deemed by the local papers as one of the most "important social and cultural events". The uniqueness of the "Trilogy" idea was that no one singer in the world had ever given three completely different performances during only 10 days.

The first show was held in the "Rossiya" concert hall, where Alsou performed her old set entitled "Alsou And Her Authors", which had never been presented in Moscow before. The second show was an exclusive orchestral concert in Tchaikovsky Hall, where there were only 1,500 seats. The third show was a Europop show entitled "Solo". It was held in the Olympic Sports Complex and contained new Russian and English songs, with a fantasy-oriented set. After the third show, Alsou shot a video for the song "Vchera" ("Yesterday").

On 23 January 2003, Alsou released her new Russian album entitled 19. The CD was received well by critics, and by April 2003 the sales had reached 500.000 copies. 19 spawned such singles as "Vsyo Ravno" ("Anyway"), "Vchera" ("Yesterday"), "Perviy Raz" ("The First Time"), "Mechty" ("Dreams") feat. Karl Frierson (mixed by Pit Baumgartner from De Phazz), "Letyashchaya Nad Oblakami" ("Flying Over the Clouds"), and "Etkey" ("Father", a Tatarstan single).

After the success of 19, she was nominated for the First National Music Award, "Muz-TV". On 5 June 2003, after arriving in Moscow from working in foreign studios, Alsou unexpectedly found herself the winner of the "Best Female Artist" nomination. The voting was held all over Russia, and Alsou could not stop the tears of joy. To support the sales of album 19, Alsou gave successful performances in Russia, Ukraine, Georgia, Azerbaijan, Latvia, Israel and Kazakhstan.

=== Second English album ===
For almost four years, Alsou worked on her second English album 'Inspired'. It was recorded in London and Los Angeles. The lead single, "Always on My Mind", was written by Alsou and Morten Schjolin. The video was filmed in May 2004 by a well-known director Joseph Kahn. At the beginning of 2005, the single premiered on Capital FM and became the best news single of the week. However, despite the heavy UK promotion, a sexy video, touring as a support act with boyband Westlife, and performing in the London club G-A-Y, the commercial single was canceled by Alsou's UK label Mercury Records, though physical copies were available for a short time. 'Inspired' remains unreleased.

Alsou is credited on most of the tracks recorded for Inspired. The album was produced by several of the industry's best producers including Rhett Lawrence and Bass Bros. Inspired features a cover version of Lionel Richie's "Hello". Another well-circulated track is the Nelly-featured "Wish I Didn't Know", though only a rough demo has leaked. The album is more guitar-flavored than Alsou's previous works. Originally it was intended to record the album with mostly ballads, but then the album's direction changed.

At a meeting of the official Russian Alsou Fan Club in Moscow on 9 June 2013 the album 'Inspired' was given to the fan club members for free. The CDs were self-made by Alsou. It was the first time that the entire album came into the world.

In 2006, Alsou recorded a wedding song, "Miracles", written by Alsou and her then-future husband Yan Abramov. It was released as a limited single for the guests of the wedding. The song is not part of the album 'Inspired'.

=== The Main Thing and Tugan Tel ===
Alsou's third Russian album Samoe Glavnoe ("The Main Thing"), her first LP in five years, was released on 31 March 2008 by Universal Music Russia. The singles from this album are "Nebo" ("Sky", released back in 2005), "Samoe Glavnoe" ("The Main Thing", 2006, the video was shot when she was pregnant though it is not visible), "A u moei ljubvi" ("And My Love Has...", 2007, shot in California desert and directed by Alan Calzatti). During 2008 Alsou recorded an album in Tatar language as well. Released in the fall and named Туган тел (Tugan Tel' | Mother's Tongue), the album includes several Tatar peoples' songs, others written specially for Alsou, some Tatar music instruments, and a choir. All proceeds were given by Alsou and Universal Music for sponsorship of talented orphans from Tatarstan.

=== Non-musical work ===
In June 2004, Alsou performed in the British mystical thriller Spirit Trap with Billie Piper, Luke Mably, Emma Catherwood and Sam Troughton. The film premiered in August 2005. Alsou's self-written ballad "Teardrops" plays over the credits. The film got poor reviews and small returns at the box office, and it was soon released on DVD. A release of her second motion picture is awaited in 2008 – earlier in 2006 she starred in the Russian historical drama "Vivat, Anna!" from a cycle of films about the Russian monarchy. She also recorded a song for the movie, a melody from which serves as 1st track (Intro) of "Samoe Glavnoe".

=== Plans ===
Alsou is currently selecting a single for her next Russian album of original songs she is working on. Currently, she is also recording a double Russian album of lullabies and popular children's songs. At the beginning of 2010, she started recording a jazz album with the help of George Benson. She has presented the final of the Eurovision Song Contest 2009 in Moscow. The hosts are normally required to translate monologue into French, which she demonstrated quite fluently for the event. Six years later, she became one of the five jurors for Russian jury panel in the Eurovision Song Contest 2015.

== Legal issues ==
Alsou's second daughter Mikella participated in The Voice Kids (Russian season 6) of vocal competition show The Voice Kids (Russian TV series) produced by Channel One Russia, and was announced a winner of the superfinal, which was aired on April 26, 2019, as she received 56.5% of the votes. It caused a huge outrage by social media users as they suspected Mikella's victory was a result of vote manipulation by Alsou and her husband. The outrage prompted Channel One Russia to review the voting results and, after the fraud was proven, Mikella's victory was canceled.

== Awards ==
Award	Year	Nominee(s)	Category	Result	Ref.
MTV Europe Music Awards	2001	Herself	Best Russian Act	Won	
MTV Video Music Awards	2001	"Before You Love Me"	Viewer's Choice	Nominated	
Muz-TV Music Awards	2003	Herself	Female Artist of the Year	Won	
Muz-TV Music Awards	2005	Herself	Female Artist of the Year	Nominated	
Muz-TV Music Awards	2005	"Always on My Mind"	Video of the Year	Won	
World Music Awards	2001	Herself	World's Best Selling Russian Artist	Won	
ZD Awards	1999	Herself	Best Female	Nominated	

Before Alsou turned 18, she had already achieved great success and was honored several times.

- The Honourable and The Peoples' Singer of Tatarstan Republic
- The Honourable citizen of Bugulma
- The Best selling single of 2000 (National Russian "Record" award for "You're My #1")

== Discography ==
=== Albums ===
All release dates are Russian unless noted otherwise

- Алсу (1999) – Her debut album in Russian, re-released in 2001 with the same title including two new songs
- Alsou (2001) – First album in English
- Мне приснилась осень (2002) – Second re-release of the debut album including five new songs
- 19 (2003) – Second Russian album
- Самое главное (2008) – Third Russian album
- Родная речь. Туган тел (2008) – First album in Tatar
- Фея добрых снов (2011) – First album for children
- Inspired (2013) – Second English album, recorded in 2003–2005, only released during a fan club meeting as a gift by Alsou
- Ты – это свет (2014) – Fourth Russian Album
- Письма, пришедшие с войны (2015) – Fifth Russian Album
- Я хочу одеться в белое (2020) - Sixth Russian Album

=== English singles ===
- "Solo" (2000) – a European single released before Eurovision Song Contest
- "You're My #1" (2000, with Enrique Iglesias)
- "Before You Love Me" (2001) – the single peaked at No. 27 in the UK Singles Chart and No. 1 on MTV UK
- "He Loves Me" (2001) – the last single from 'Alsou' released in Europe
- "Run Right Out of Time" (2002) – promo single with the Gala magazine (Russian Edition)
- "Always on My Mind" (2004) – canceled European single from Inspired
- "Miracles" (2006) – a limited 1-track single released for the guests on Alsou's wedding
- "Love U Back" (2018)

=== Videography ===
- "Зимний сон" (Zimniy Son | Winter Dream) 1999
- "Весна" (Vesna | Spring) 1999
- "Иногда" (Inogda | Sometimes) 1999
- "Solo" 2000
- "You're My #1" 2000
- "Before You Love Me" 2000
- "He Loves Me" 2001
- "Осень" (Osen' | Autumn) 2001
- "Всё равно" (Vsyo Ravno | No Matter) 2002
- "Летящая над облаками" (Letyaschaya Nad Oblakami | Flying Over The Clouds) 2002
- "Вчера" (Vchera | Yesterday) 2002
- "Әткәй" (Atkay | Father) 2002
- "Мечты" (Mechty | Dreams) 2003
- "Первый раз" (Perviy Raz | First Time) 2003
- "Everybody" 2004
- "Always on My Mind" 2004
- "Небо" (Nebo | Sky) 2005
- "Самое главное" (Samoe Glavnoe | The Main Thing) 2006
- "А у моей любви" (A U Moey Lyubvi | And My Love) 2007
- "Сандугачым-гүзәлем" (Sandugaschym-Gyuzalem | My Beautiful Nightingale) 2008
- "Уфа юкәләре" (Ufa Yukalare | Ufa Tilias ) 2008

=== Other collaborations ===
- Livin' on a Prayer (2003, a duet with Bon Jovi recorded for the Russian edition of their album This Left Feels Right and released to Russian radio stations, but then canceled).
- How High the Moon (2005, a guest appearance with Sting, Richie Sambora and Joss Stone, released worldwide on Les Paul's album American Made World Played).

== See also ==
- List of Eurovision Song Contest presenters

Awards and achievements
Preceded by Alla Pugacheva with "Primadonna"	Russia in the Eurovision Song Contest; 2000	Succeeded by Mumiy Troll with "Lady Alpine Blue"
Preceded by (Serbia) Jovana Janković and Željko Joksimović	Eurovision Song Contest presenter (Final, with Ivan Urgant); 2009	Succeeded by (Norway) Nadia Hasnaoui, Haddy Jatou N'jie and Erik Solbakken
