= She's Mad =

Single by David Byrne

from the album Uh-Oh
- B-side: "Buck Naked" (live); "Greenback Dollar" (live); "Somebody"
- Released: 1992
- Genre: Rock; pop
- Length: 5:21 (album version), 3:59 (single edit)
- Label: Warner Bros.; Luaka Bop
- Songwriter: David Byrne
- Producer: Nick Launay

David Byrne singles chronology
| "Hanging Upside Down" (1992) | "She's Mad" (1992) | "Angels" (1994) |

"She's Mad" is a single by American musician David Byrne. It was released in 1992 in support of Byrne's second studio album Uh-Oh.

The song reached No. 3 on the U.S. Modern Rock Tracks chart.

== Music video ==
A music video was released for the song, featuring Byrne being distorted by special effects while singing. The video was directed by Byrne and the special effects were done by Carlos Arguello and Michele Ferrone of Pacific Data Images. In addition to that, it was nominated for Breakthrough Video and Best Special Effects for the 1992 MTV Video Music Awards.

== Track listing ==
All tracks written by David Byrne unless noted.

12" release

1. She's Mad (album version) - 5:21
2. Buck Naked (live) - 3:36
3. Greenback Dollar (live) - 1:52 (Hoyt Axton, Kennard Ramsey)

7" release

1. She's Mad (single edit) - 3:58
2. Somebody - 4:59
