= Andrew Lane (music producer) =

American record producer

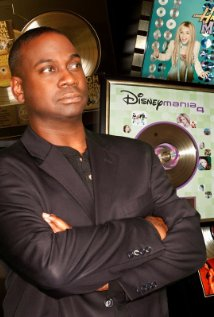
- Lane in 2015

Background information
- Born: Andrew Lane; San Diego, CA, U.S.
- Genres: Pop, pop rock, dance-pop, synthpop, pop rap
- Occupations: Musician, record producer, songwriter
- Instruments: Guitar, drums, bass guitar, vocals, piano, electronic keyboard, DAW, Pro Tools
- Years active: 1992–present
- Labels: Universal Records, Elektra Records, EMI Records, Interscope Records Sony/Columbia,Cash Money Walt Disney Records

Andrew Lane is a pop-hip hop-R&B record producer and songwriter. He was born in San Diego, California.

Lane has worked with artists such as Backstreet Boys and Irene Cara. As a producer and songwriter, Lane has received gold and platinum accreditations for his work with R&B artists Speech, Keith Sweat, and Alsou. He also worked on the platinum-accredited records High School Musical, Hannah Montana, Disneymania 4, and Manny Fresh.

2012 Billboard Awards Winning producer Andrew Lane has teamed up with MP3 Music Awards to offer US Demo Recording contracts to the 2012 BUA Award Winner - Best Unsigned Act

In 1995, Lane relocated to Atlanta, Georgia, and formed the company Drew Right Music, Inc. In the fall of 1998, Lane received a producing-songwriting credit for three songs on Keith Sweat's Didn't See Me Coming album.

Between 1998 and 2001, Lane produced and wrote songs for Universal, Elektra. and EMI.

In 2000, Lane wrote "Solo" for Russian pop star Alsou. Alsou represented Russia in the Eurovision Song Contest 2000 with this song and finished second. Subsequently, the single was released on Universal Music Russia and included in her first English album released in 2001.

In 2003, Lane produced and co-wrote the song "Don't Even Try", which was used in the Disney movie Pixel Perfect, and became part of the soundtrack that charted for several weeks on the Billboard Top 200.

In 2006, Lane, along with several other writers and producers, worked on the High School Musical and Hannah Montana soundtracks. Lane produced, mixed, and programmed B5's version of "Get Your Head in Tha Game" which sold over 4.7 million copies.

In 2007–2009, Lane discovered and produced the Clique Girls, who landed a record deal with Interscope Records.

Lane has 11 songs featured in the film Bring It On (Fight to the Finish).

Andrew is the older brother of Disabled Journalist Paul Amadeus Lane.

== Discography ==
Title	Year	Artist	Album	EP	Show	Network	Label
Bailamos	2020-2021	Danielle Cohn	-	-	-	-	-
Do It Better	2020-2021	Danielle Cohn	-	-	-	-	-
Christmas in LA	2020-2021	Danielle Cohn	-	-	-	-	-
Beautiful - Remix produced by Andrew Lane	2020-2021	Iamkeynotes feat. Chris Brown and Gavin Magnus	-	-	-	-	-
Guilty - Remix produced by Andrew Lane	2020-2021	Iamkeynotes feat. Tory Lanez and Gavin Magnus	-	-	-	-	-
All These People - Remix produced by Andrew Lane	2020-2021	Iamkeynotes feat. Drake and Gavin Magnus	-	-	-	-	-
A Whole 'Nother Level	2020-2021	Gavin Magnus	-	-	-	-	Sony/Columbia
Take From Me	2020-2021	Gavin Magnus	-	-	-	-	Sony/Columbia
Hearts on a Pendant	2020-2021	Gavin Magnus	-	-	-	-	Sony/Columbia
What they Want from me	2020-2021	Gavin Magnus	-	-	-	-	Sony/Columbia
Fall	2020-2021	Gavin Magnus	-	Broken	-	-	Sony/Columbia
Sad Song	2020-2021	Gavin Magnus	-	-	-	-	Sony/Columbia
Fake Love	2020-2021	Gavin Magnus feat. Luh Kel	-	-	-	-	Sony/Columbia
Theme Song	2019	-	-	-	Next Level	-	-
Girl Code	2019	Nia Sioux	-	-	-	-	-
Bottled Up	2019	Emily Skinner	-	-	-	-	-
Rebel	2019	Lauren Orlando	-	-	-	-	-
Who Am I	2019	Brooke Butler	-	-	-	-	-
Anybody	2019	That Band Honey	-	-	-	-	-
Turn Out The Lights	2019	That Band Honey	-	-	-	-	-
You & Me	2019	That Band Honey	-	-	-	-	-
Salvador Dalí	2019	That Band Honey	-	-	-	-	-
Burn	2017	-	-	-	13 Reasons why	-	Drew Right Inc
What Becomes of Us	2017	Lela Brown	-	-	-	-	Radio Disney Smart Boy Ent
Movie Star	2015	Carson Lueders Weg	-	-	-	-	WEJ
Every Little Step	2015	Carson Lueders Weg	-	-	-	-	WEJ
Sugar Sugar	2014	Miguelito Feat Shawn Stockman	-	-	-	-	Drew Right Inc
Party Non Stop	2013	Miguelito	-	-	-	-	Drew Right Inc
You try	2013	Bonnie Tyler	-	-	-	-	ZYX Music
You are My Life	2013	Fistland	-	-	-	-	Universal
So Nice	2012	Kumi Koda Feat Mr Blistah	-	-	-	-	Rhythm Zone
Stand up	2012	Coco Jones	-	-	-	Disney Channel	-
So original	2012	Coco Jones	-	-	-	Disney Channel	-
Sweet 13	2012	Coco Jones	-	-	-	Disney Channel	-
Forever is for you	2011	Luv And Soul	-	-	-	-	Universal Japan
My Friend	2011	Cymia Cash Money	-	-	-	-	Universal
On the Fly	2011	Daniel Curtis Lee	-	-	NBA Fit Espn	-	Drew Right Inc/ The Disney Channel
-	2011	Disney and Nick Stars	-	-	If the Earth Could Speak	-	Drew Right Inc
This Xmas	2010	Keana	-	Xmas Ep	-	-	Warner Japan Music Group
Xmas Dream	2010	Keana	-	Xmas Ep	-	-	Warner Japan Music Group
Lucky Color	2010	Keana	-	-	-	-	Warner Japan Music Group
One Way To Me	2010	Keana	-	-	-	-	Warner Japan Music Group
Until I See You Again	2010	Keana	-	-	-	-	Warner Japan Music Group
The Next New You	2010	Keana	-	-	-	-	Warner Japan Music Group
Butterflies	2010	Keana	-	-	-	-	Warner Japan Music Group
You Could Be the One	2010	Keana	-	-	-	-	Warner Japan Music Group
Love It	2010	Keana	-	-	-	-	Warner Japan Music Group
Kid Nation	2010	Cymia	-	-	-	-	Cash Money Records
Miss Popular	2010	Cymia	-	-	-	-	Cash Money Records
Keep On Dancing	2010	Cymia	-	-	-	-	Cash Money Records
Bestie	2010	Cymia	-	-	-	-	Cash Money Records
Debut	2010	Cymia	-	-	-	-	Cash Money Records
Turn it up	2010	Montana Tucker Featuring Flo Rida	-	-	-	-	Interscope Records
Neva Will I Eva	2009	Lisa Left Eye Lopes	Eye Legacy	-	-	-	Independent
Listen	2009	Lisa Left Eye Lopes	Eye Legacy	-	-	-	Independent
Turn the Lights Out	2009	-	Bring It On Soundtrack	-	-	-	Universal
Burn	2009	-	Bring It On Soundtrack	-	-	-	Universal
Fuerte Fuerte	2009	-	Bring It On Soundtrack	-	-	-	Universal
Dale	2009	-	Bring It On Soundtrack	-	-	-	Universal
Candy Swirl	2009	-	Bring It On Soundtrack	-	-	-	Universal
Famous	2009	-	Bring It On Soundtrack	-	-	-	Universal
Boy Hunter	2009	-	Bring It On Soundtrack	-	-	-	Universal
Drop It Hot	2009	-	Bring It On Soundtrack	-	-	-	Universal
We Are the Dream Team	2009	-	Bring It On Soundtrack	-	-	-	Universal
Boom	2009	-	Bring It On Soundtrack	-	-	-	Universal
Oh Oh Here We Go	2009	-	Bring It On Soundtrack	-	-	-	Universal
Incredible	2008	Clique Girlz	-	-	Princess Diaries DVD game	-	Interscope Records
U think	2008	Clique Girlz	-	-	-	-	Interscope Records
Incredible	2008	Clique Girlz	-	-	-	-	Interscope Records
Girls Rock	2008	Clique Girlz	-	-	-	-	Interscope Records
Incredible	2008	Clique Girls	-	-	So you think you can dance	ABC	-
You Don't Know	2008	Clique Girls	-	-	-	-	Olyimpics
Gotta Let u Know	2008	Kim Kline	-	-	-	-	Independent
Don't you Think I'm Hot	2008	-	-	-	Bring It On (In it to Win it)	-	Beacon Pictures / Universal Studios
Do You Deliver	2007	UK Girls	-	-	-	-	-
La Ciudad	2007	Abusivo	La Costa Nuestra	-	-	-	Machete Music/UMG
Power In You	2007	Collin Raye	-	-	-	-	StarPointe Records
Wanna	2007	Nakanomori Band	-	-	-	-	Teichiku Records
You know You Want It	2006	Chis Doran	-	-	-	-	Eurovision Winn
Fly to Heaven	2006	Pollyanna Dorough	Pope John Paul II Tribute Album	-	-	-	-
Shining Star	2006	B5	Hanna Montana Soundtrack	-	-	-	Walt Disney Records
Ohh Wee	2006	Coco Brown	-	-	-	-	Parlane
Have you ever been here before	2006	-	-	-	Beauty 24 Soundtrack	-	-
Bomb Thang	2006	SLF	-	-	Spin the Movie	-	-
Get Your Head in the Game	2006	B5	High School Musical Soundtrack	-	-	-	Walt Disney Records
Big Bad Wolf	2006	-	Disneymania 4	-	-	-	Walt Disney Records
Don't Even Try It	2006	-	Pixel Perfect Soundtrack	-	-	-	-
Downtown	2005	Irene Cara	-	-	-	-	Independent
Life in the Fast Lane	2005	Irene Cara	-	-	-	-	Independent
You Think	2005	Bratz	-	-	-	-	Rock Angelz
Somebody (Japanese Release)	2002	Keith Sweat	Rebirth	-	-	-	Electra
Didn't See Me Coming	2000	Keith Sweat	-	-	-	-	Electra
Real Man	2000	Keith Sweat	-	-	-	-	Electra
Don't Have Me	2000	Keith Sweat Feat. Dave Hollister	-	-	-	-	Electra
He Say, She Say	2000	Keith Sweat Feat. T-Boz*Alsou	-	-	-	-	Electra
Solo	2000/2001	Alsou	Alsou	-	Eurovision Song Contest 2000	-	Universal Music Russia (single); Mercury Records / Universal Music (album)
Back To Your Heart	1999	Backstreet Boys (Pre Production)	Millennium	-	-	-	Jive Records
