= Gabriela Vaquer =

Puerto Rican footballer (born 1990)

Personal information
- Date of birth: 7 May 1990 (age 36)
- Place of birth: San Juan, Puerto Rico
- Position: Midfielder

Senior career*
Years	Team	Apps	(Gls)
2015	Romano SA		
2018	Puerto Rico Pride		

International career^{‡}
2010	Puerto Rico	4	(0)
- * Club domestic league appearances and goals ‡ National team caps and goals as of 1 August 2010

Gabriela Vaquer (born 7 May 1990) is a Puerto Rican footballer who plays as a midfielder. She has been a member of the Puerto Rico women's national team.

== Early life ==
Vaquer was raised in San Juan.
