= Pakorn Lam =

Thai singer and actor (born 1979)

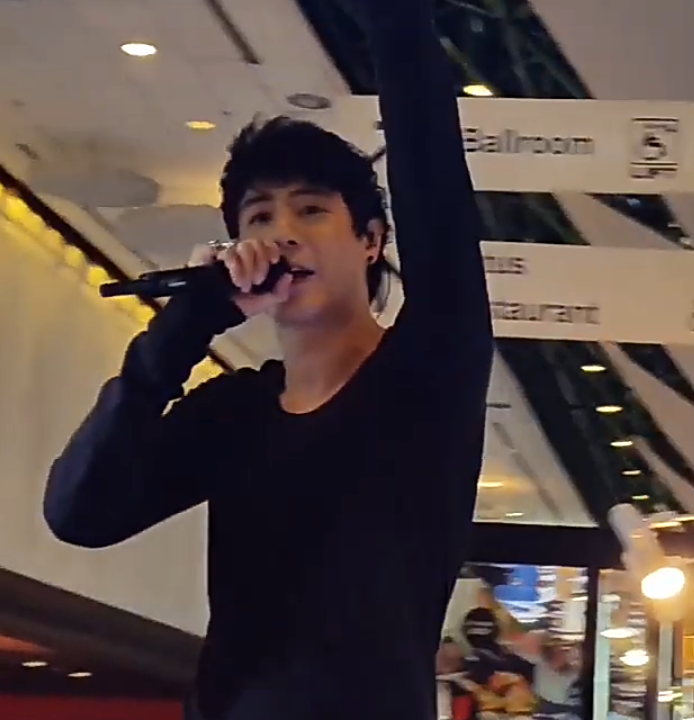
- Dome in 2021
- Born: Siam Lam; 12 September 1979 (age 46); Bangkok, Thailand
- Other name: Dome
- Occupations: Actor; Singer
- Years active: 1995-present
- Spouse: Metal Sukkhao (m. 2019)

Pakorn Lam (Thai: ปกรณ์ ลัม, RTGS: Pakon Lam; born 12 September 1979), also known by his nickname Dome (Thai: โดม) is a Thai singer and actor.

== Career ==
Dome was born in Bangkok, to a Singaporean father and a Thai born Chinese German mother.

He made his acting debut in 2011 with a Thai television soap opera, Rak Mai Mee Wan Tai (Love Never Dies) and also starred in the musical Tawiphob.

In December 2025, Dome made a crude comment on a Facebook photograph depicting Yossuda "Jinnie" Leelapanyalert, the 26-year-old daughter of Thai politician Sudarat Keyuraphan. Dome publicly apologized and said that he had been drunk at the time; Jinnie filed a complaint with the Metropolitan Police Bureau citing a newly-in-effect law criminalizing digital sexual harassment.

== Discography ==
=== Album ===
Title	Year	Album details	Label
Dome	1996	Track listing: 1. เพียงจำไว้ (Piang jum wai); 2. ยิ่งรักเธอ (Ying ruk thoe); 3. ดื้อ (Deu); 4. สวีท (Sweet); 5. สมมุติ (Sommut); 6. ห่วงกันบ้างซิ (Huang gun bang si); 7. สูตรไหนดี (Soot nai dee); 8. ยิ่งรักเธอ (Clubmixed) (Ying ruk thoe (Clubmixed)); 9. เศษเวลา (Set wela); 10. โดมิโน่ (Domino); 11. ยอมทุกที (Yom took thi); 12. ทางใหม่ (Tang mai); 13. ยิ่งรักเธอ (Acoustic) (Ying ruk thoe (Acoustic)	RS Promotion
Dangerous Dome	1998	Track listing: 1. Hey! อันตราย (Hey Un ta rai); 2. อย่ารักเขาได้ไหม (Yha ruk khao dai mai); 3. รักฉันได้หรือเปล่า (Ruk chun dai rue plao); 4. ช็อก (Shock); 5. เกินไป (Gurn pai); 6. อย่ารักเขาได้ไหม (Jungle Mix) (Yha ruk khao dai mai (Jungle mix)); 7. ยุ่งเด่ะ (Yung deh); 8. ก่อนใครจะรู้ (Gorn krai ja roo); 9. ไปเจ็บที่ไหนมา (Pai jeb thi nai ma); 10. เสียดาย (Sia dai); 11. เอาจริง (Aow jing); 12. ยุ่งเด่ะ (Underground Version) (Yung deh (Underground Version))	RS Promotion
Dome Question	1999	Track listing: 1. หน้ากาก (Na kak); 2. งมเข็มในทะเล (Ngom khem nai ta leh); 3. ก็รักกันแล้ว (Gor ruk gun laew); 4. เคี้ยวได้เลย (Kiao Dai loei); 5. เธอ (Thoe); 6. นอกคอก (Nork kork); 7. วันสุดท้าย (Wun sut thai); 8. ยังไงก็ขอบใจ (Young ngai gor khop jai); 9. วันแห่งความรัก (Wun haeng kwam ruk); 10. เท้าของผม (Thao khong phom)	RS Promotion
Dome Naked	2001	Track listing: 1. ผ่าเหล่า (Pah lao); 2. เวลา (Wela); 3. กำแพงอากาศ (Kum phaeng a kat); 4. ฟูมฟัก (Foom fak); 5. ไม่ปรกติ (Mai pok ka ti); 6. เวลา (Remix) (Wela (Remix)); 7. เต็มที่กับชีวิต (Tem thi kub cheewit); 8. ไม่ได้ยากเลย (Mai dai yak loei); 9. รอ (Roh); 10. ห่มเธอ (Hom thoe); 11. กระดุม (Kra dum); 12. เวลา (ดนตรีฝึกร้อง) (Wela (Instrumental))	RS Promotion

== Filmography ==
=== TV dramas ===
Year	Thai title	Title	Role	Network	Notes	With
2011	รักไม่มีวันตาย	Ruk Mai Mee Wun Tay	Taiphoom	3HD33		Laila Boonyasak
2012	ตะวันทอแสง	Tawan Tor Saeng	Pakapon Talingyod (Pak)	7HD35		Davika Hoorne
2014	เสน่หาสัญญาแค้น	Sanaeha Sunya Kaen	Nhakin	3HD33		Janie Tienphosuwan
2018	บ่วงรักซาตาน	Buang Rak Za tan	Hemmarad Padtanakid-Anan (Hem)	3HD33		Rasri Balenciaga Chirathiwat
2021	น้ำผึ้งขม		Purim Pidsanukarn (Pu)	3HD33		Preeyakarn Jaikanta

=== TV series ===
Year	Thai title	Title	Role	Network	Notes	With
2017	ศรีอโยธยา		Front Palace / Thammathibet / Jao Fah Kung	True4U	Cameo	
2018	ศรีอโยธยา 2		Front Palace / Thammathibet / Jao Fah Kung	True4U	Cameo	
2021	Club Friday The Series 12 Uncharted Love รักซ่อนเร้น ตอน เรื่องเศร้าของคนโสด		Kha-Chen	True4U		Namthip Jongrachatawiboon; Preeyada Sittachai

=== Film ===
Year	Thai title	Title	Role	Note	Reference
1988	อีจู้กู้ปู่ป้า				
1996	อนึ่ง คิดถึงพอสังเขป รุ่น 2	MISS YOU 2	Tamjai Saithong		
2012	รัก 7 ปี ดี 7 หน	Seven Something	Dome	Cameo	
2013	จันดารา ปัจฉิมบท	Jan Dara the Beginning	Dr.Tiva	Cameo	

== YouTube ==
Year	Thai title	Title	Network	Notes	With
2020–present	Analog Photographer		YouTuber:Domepakornlamonline		
