= Before You Love Me =

Single by Alsou

from the album Alsou
- Released: April 30, 2001
- Recorded: 2000
- Genre: Pop
- Length: 2:57 (Radio Mix)
- Label: Universal Music
- Songwriters: Lars H. Jensen, Martin M. Larsson, Mick Leeson
- Producers: D. Papalexis & Grizzly

Alsou singles chronology
"You're My #1" (2000)	"Before You Love Me" (2001)	"He Loves Me" (2001)

"Before You Love Me" is a song by Russian singer Alsou, her first single released from her first album, Alsou. It was released on April 30, 2001, in Australia and the United Kingdom, and a few weeks later in May 2001 in various countries throughout Europe.

The single failed to chart in Australia. In the United Kingdom it peaked at number twenty-seven.

A lack of promotional support from Alsou's record company meant that no further releases occurred in either Australia or the United Kingdom, with the impending release of the Alsou album cancelled in both regions. The single was, however, effective in producing the hype it needed throughout Europe for the album to be released and proper promotion to take place.

== Track listing ==
Australian/UK CD Single

1. "Before You Love Me" (Radio Mix) — 2:57
2. "Before You Love Me" (Sunship Vocal Mix) — 5:22
3. "Before You Love Me" (Sleazesisters Anthem Mix) — 6:47
4. "Before You Love Me" (Video) — 2:53

UK cassette Single

1. "Before You Love Me" (Radio Mix)
2. "Before You Love Me" (Secret Agents Remix)

German CD Single

1. "Before You Love Me" (Radio Mix) — 3.00
2. "Before You Love Me" (Remix by Frank Johnes and Tom Remm for Musicago-Studio) - 3.11
3. "Before You Love Me" (Sunship Vocal Mix) — 5:20
4. "Before You Love Me" (Sleazesisters Anthem Mix) — 6:46

== Charts ==
Chart (2001)	Peak Position
Poland Airplay (Music & Media)	18
Scottish Singles Sales (Official Charts)	27
UK Singles (Official Charts)	27
UK Pop Club Chart (Hit Music)	1

== Release history ==
Release dates and formats for "Before You Love Me"
Region	Date	Format(s)	Label(s)	Ref(s).
United Kingdom	30 April 2001	CD; LP	Mercury	
Germany	30 April 2001	LP	Mercury	
France	5 June 2001	CD	Universal	
Germany	29 June 2001	CD	Mercury	
Belgium	29 June 2001	CD	Mercury	
Netherlands	2 July 2001	CD	Mercury	
