= Twister (band) =

There are numerous bands called "Twister"

- Origin: Campinas, Brazil
- Genres: Pop rock
- Years active: 1998–2003, 2013–present
- Label: Abril Music
- Members: Sander Mecca; Luciano Lucca; Leo Richter; Gilson Campos; Alex Bandera
- Past members: Thiago Calabrez

Twister is a Brazilian pop rock band formed in 2000. The band was originally composed of Sander Mecca (guitar), Leo Richter (bass guitar), Luciano Lucca (keyboards), Gilson Campos (drums) and Alex Bandera (guitar).

== History ==
The group Twister arose after the businessman Hélio Batista discover the vocalist Sander Mecca in a bar in São Paulo. At that time, Mecca used to play guitar making covers of songs by Pearl Jam. After receiving a proposal from Batista, Mecca started looking for other members for the band. He went to Campinas to make music classes, where he met Lucca and Campos, and together, they created Twister. In the same year, Batista hired Thiago Calabrez as a new member. Back in São Paulo, the group started rehearsing every day and searched for a record company. In 1999, they met Richter, who replaced Calabrez.

In 2000, they released the album "Twister," their first recorded with Abril Music. The hit "40 graus" ("40 Degrees" in English) topped the Brazilian charts, and the album sold 250,000 copies, also reaching the 67th position among the 100 most played songs in Brazil that year.

In 2001, Lucca decided to abandon the group after having some discussions with the Batista. Bandera replaced him. Two months later, the group dumped Batista and called back Lucca.

In March 2001, they traveled to Los Angeles with a proposal of the record company to the release of their first CD in Spanish. In June, the CD twister was released in United States, Mexico and Puerto Rico and the group made a tour during one month, with shows in Miami, Los Angeles and San Juan, Puerto Rico. This CD was not released in Brazil.

Later in 2001, the band was invited to open a 'N Sync show in Mexico, in a stadium with a capacity of 100,000 people.

In 2002, the band released their third album, Mochila e Guitarra no Avião, which had a version in Portuguese of the song "I Drive Myself Crazy", by 'N Sync.

But 2002 was marked by unforeseen events. One of them was the closing Abril Music, and the project to release a new CD did not happen. Another was the imprisonment of Mecca for drug use.

At the end in 2003, Mecca created another band named Meccamorfose, Richter released a CD and followed a solo career making shows beside the singer Thaeme, winner of the second edition of the show Ídolos (American Idol Brazil), Lucca is a hair stylist and Campos became a gospel singer.

In 2011, Thiago Calabrez (Tcalabrez) followed his career in electronic music, acting as disc jockey with a national and international career.

In 2013, the band announced their return and released a new single named Pé Na Estrada.

== Band members ==
=== Current members ===
- Sander Mecca – vocals, guitar (1998–2004; 2013–present)
- Luciano Lucca – keyboards (1998–2004; 2013–present)
- Leo Richter – bass (1999–2004; 2013–present)
- Gilson Campos – drums (1998–2004; 2013–present)
- Alex Bandera – guitar (2001–2004; 2013–present)

=== Former members ===
- Thiago Calabrez – guitar (1998–1999)

== Albums ==
- 2000 - Twister
- 2001 - En Español
- 2002 - Mochila e Guitarra no Avião
