= Tihuana =

Brazilian rock band

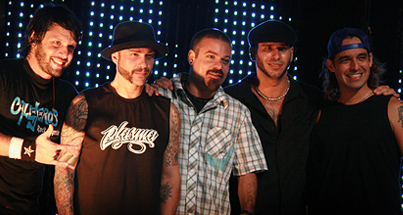
- Tihuana in 2009. From left: Román Laurito, Egypcio, Fernando Baía, Léo Stuart, and PG

Background information
- Origin: São Paulo, Brazil
- Genres: Hardcore punk, alternative metal, rapcore, reggae, ska
- Years active: 1999–2017; 2024–present
- Labels: Virgin, Chaos, EMI, Arsenal, Universal, Building
- Members: Egypcio; Román Laurito; Léo Stuart; PG; Fernando Baía
- Past members: Fouad Khayat

Tihuana is a Brazilian rock band, formed in 1999 in São Paulo. Their musical influences include reggae, rap, rock, ska and Latin music. Between 2000 and 2013, the band released six studio albums and one live album.

The band is known for their hit song Tropa de Elite, which made an appearance in the film, Tropa de Elite. The song included on the soundtrack was written and produced by Tihuana years before the development of the film of the same name. In 2022, the band's song "Tropa de Elite " was used in videos supporting Brazilian President Jair Bolsonaro. Tihuana's lead singer Egypcio condemned the use of the band's song in the political videos, saying the use of their music was unauthorized.

In spring 2025, the band, with their original line up, begun a Brazilian tour in honor of the 25th anniversary of their first album release.

== Band members ==
=== Current members ===
- Egypcio: vocals and guitar (1999–2017; 2024–present)
- Román Laurito: bass and backing vocals (1999–2017; 2024–present)
- Léo Stuart: guitar (1999–2017; 2024–present)
- PG: drums and backing vocals (1999–2017; 2024–present)
- Fernando Baía: percussion, vocals and backing vocals (1999–2012; 2024–present)

=== Past members ===
- Fouad Khayat: percussion (2012–2017)

== Discography ==
=== Studio albums ===
- (2000) Ilegal
- (2001) A Vida Nos Ensina
- (2002) Aqui ou em Qualquer Lugar
- (2004) Tihuana
- (2006) Um Dia de Cada Vez
- (2013) Agora é pra Valer!

=== Live albums ===
- (2008) Tropa de Elite ao Vivo
