= Aneiki =

Australian pop duo

- Also known as: Halogen
- Origin: Brisbane, Queensland, Australia
- Genres: Pop
- Label: Meridienmusik
- Past members: Jennifer Waite; Grant Wallis

Aneiki was an Australian pop duo from Brisbane, Queensland, made up of Jennifer Waite and Grant Wallis. The duo was originally called Halogen, but were forced to change their name after the Perth-based band Halogen established sole rights to the name's usage in Australia.

Aneiki worked with the songwriter Daniel Jones and was signed to his label, Meridienmusik. Their debut single, "Pleased to Meet You", reached number 26 on the ARIA Singles Chart, spending 18 weeks in the top 100 and was number 13 on 2001's Australian Artist Singles chart. "Pleased to Meet You" was the most played Australian song on Australian radio in 2002. Waite and Wallis were awarded APRA's Breakthrough Songwriter of the Year in 2002, an award they shared with Sia.

The follow-up singles "Superhero", "15 Minutes", and "Even Without You" reached numbers 48, 72 and 97. Their debut album Words in Place of Objects reached number 87 on the ARIA Albums Chart.

== Discography ==
=== Albums ===
List of albums, with selected details and chart positions
| Title | Album details | Peak chart positions |
| Title | Album details | AUS |
|---|---|---|
| Words in Place of Objects | Released: September 2002; Label: Meridienmusik (300676–2); Format: CD | 87 |

=== Singles ===
List of singles, with selected chart positions
| Title | Year | Peak chart positions | | Album |
| Title | Year | AUS | NZ | Album |
|---|---|---|---|---|
| "Pleased to Meet You" | 2001 | 26 | 39 | Words in Place of Objects |
| "Superhero" | 2001 | 48 | - | Words in Place of Objects |
| "15 Minutes" | 2002 | 72 | - | Words in Place of Objects |
| "Even Without You" | 2002 | 97 | - | Words in Place of Objects |
