= Fatt Dex =

Australian DJ

faTT deX (Leonardo Esposito) is an Australian DJ. His single "Jus' Funkin" was nominated for the ARIA Award for Best Dance Release in 1999 and reached #65 on the ARIA singles chart.

== Discography ==
=== Singles ===
Year	Title	Peak chart positions
Year	Title	AUS
1999	"Jus' Funkin"	65
2000	"Sly P.I."	—
2001	"Creepin'" (featuring MC Trey)	—

== Awards ==
=== ARIA Music Awards ===
The ARIA Music Awards is an annual awards ceremony that recognises excellence, innovation, and achievement across all genres of Australian music. They commenced in 1987. Fatt Dex was nominated for one award.

Year	Nominee / work	Award	Result
1999	"Jus' Funkin"	Best Dance Release	Nominated
