= John Norris (reporter) =

American music journalist

- Born: March 20, 1959 (age 67); Houston, Texas
- Education: New York University
- Occupation: Journalist
- Known for: MTV News reporter

John Norris (born March 20, 1959) is an American music journalist, known as a reporter and special correspondent for MTV News and the MTV Radio Network.

== Life ==
Originally from Houston and a graduate of New York University with a degree in broadcast journalism, Norris lives in New York City. He is vegetarian, and has appeared in two PETA videos promoting animal rights and vegetarianism. He has also done non-profit work for Mercy for Animals, GLAAD, and GLSEN.

In December 2008, Norris left MTV. He is no longer listed as a correspondent by MTV News, though he appeared on June 25, 2009, to discuss the career of Michael Jackson, who had died earlier that day.

In June 2009, Norris was a founding partner in the music website Noisevox. He served as managing editor for the site and host of the Indie Rock interview series Noisemakers on Noisevox and Face Time. As a freelance journalist, Norris has written about music and culture for Vice, Entertainment Weekly, Yahoo!, Refinery29, Interview, MTV Iggy, and MTV Hive, as well as Dazed, V, and VMan magazines.

In April 2013, he was hired by the music channel Fuse, as Supervising Producer of the nightly Fuse News, where he also appeared periodically as an on-air correspondent.
