= Nenhum de Nós =

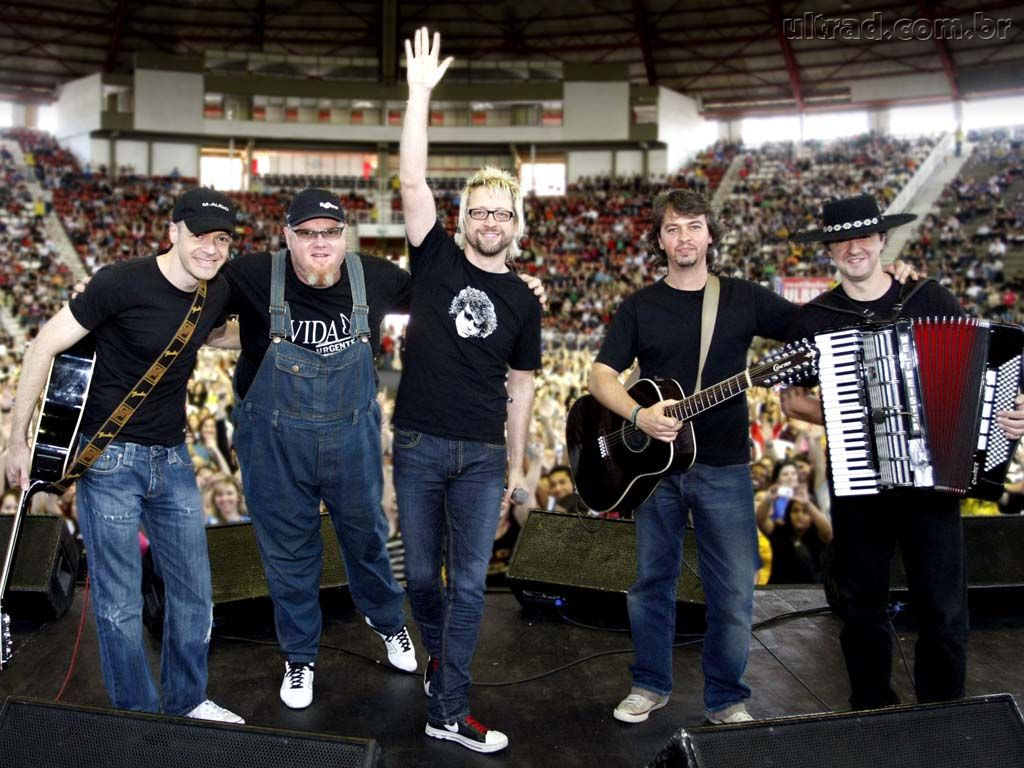

Background information
- Origin: Porto Alegre, Rio Grande do Sul, Brazil
- Genre: Rock
- Years active: 1986–present
- Members: Carlos Stein; Sady Hömrich; Thedy Corrêa; Veco Marques
- Past members: João Vicenti
- Website: www.nenhumdenos.com.br

Nenhum de Nós (Portuguese for None of Us) is a Brazilian pop rock band formed in 1986 in Porto Alegre, Rio Grande do Sul. The band primarily consists of former Engenheiros do Hawaii member Carlos Stein (guitar), Sady Hömrich (drums), Thedy Corrêa (lead vocals) and Veco Marques (guitar). One of the most famous Brazilian pop rock bands, they are well known for the song "Camila, Camila". Another member was João Vicenti (keyboards), who died on March 27, 2024.

== History ==
After having helped form the band Engenheiros do Hawaii and playing in two shows, Carlos Stein left the band to form another band with some friends that he had known since elementary school, Sady Homrich and Thedy Correa. In 1986 in Rio Grande do Sul they started playing together and came up with the name Nenhum de Nós. They wanted a name that would spark the curiosity of others, but also showed something that each of them had in common.

Thedy sang and played the acoustic guitar as a bass, Carlos played electric guitar and Sady played the drums. After only 6 shows the band caught the interests of a music producer from São Paulo and recorded their first album, Nenhum de Nós. The album was released in 1987 and contained their now classic "Camila, Camila".

Two years later, in 1989, they released their next album Cardume. Among the songs included on the album was "O Astronauta de Mármore", a Portuguese language version of David Bowie's "Starman".

In 1991 the band played in Rock in Rio II. In 1992 the band was joined by Veco Marques. He would play acoustic and electric guitar, mandolin, and sitar. In 1996 they were joined by their most recent member, João Vicenti. Vicenti plays the piano, keyboard, and accordion.

On March 27, 2024, João Vicenti, the keyboardist and accordionist of Nenhum de Nós, died at the age of 58. He had been battling kidney cancer and was undergoing medical treatment.

== Band members ==
=== Current members ===
- Thedy Corrêa – lead vocals, guitars, harmonica (1986–present); bass guitar (1986–1994) keyboards, accordion (2025–present)
- Carlos Stein – guitars (1986–present)
- Sady Homrich – drums, percussion (1986–present)
- Veco Marques – guitars (1990–present; session and touring 1989)

=== Former members ===
- João Vicenti – keyboards, piano, accordion, violin, backing vocals (1996–2024; his death; session and touring 1991–1996)

=== Current session and touring musicians ===
- Estevão Camargo – bass guitar, backing vocals (2006–present)

=== Former session and touring musicians ===
- Nico Bueno – bass guitar, backing vocals (1994–2006)

== Discography ==
=== Studio albums ===
- (1987) Nenhum de Nós
- (1989) Cardume
- (1990) Extraño
- (1992) Nenhum de Nós
- (1996) Mundo Diablo
- (1998) Paz e Amor
- (2000) Onde Você Estava em 93?
- (2001) Histórias Reais, Seres Imaginários
- (2005) Pequeno Universo
- (2011) Contos de Água e Fogo
- (2015) Sempre é Hoje

=== Live/video albums ===
- (1994) Acústico ao Vivo
- (2003) Acústico ao Vivo 2
- (2007) A Céu Aberto
- (2009) Paz & Amor – Acústico
- (2013) Contos Acústicos de Água e Fogo
- (2017) As + Pedidas

=== EPs ===
- (2018) Doble Chapa
- (2020) Feito em Casa

=== Compilation albums ===
- (2012) Outros

== Sources ==
- Biography at UOL Cliquemusic
- biography at Whiplash.net
