= Jay Vaquer =

Brazilian singer and songwriter (born 1975)

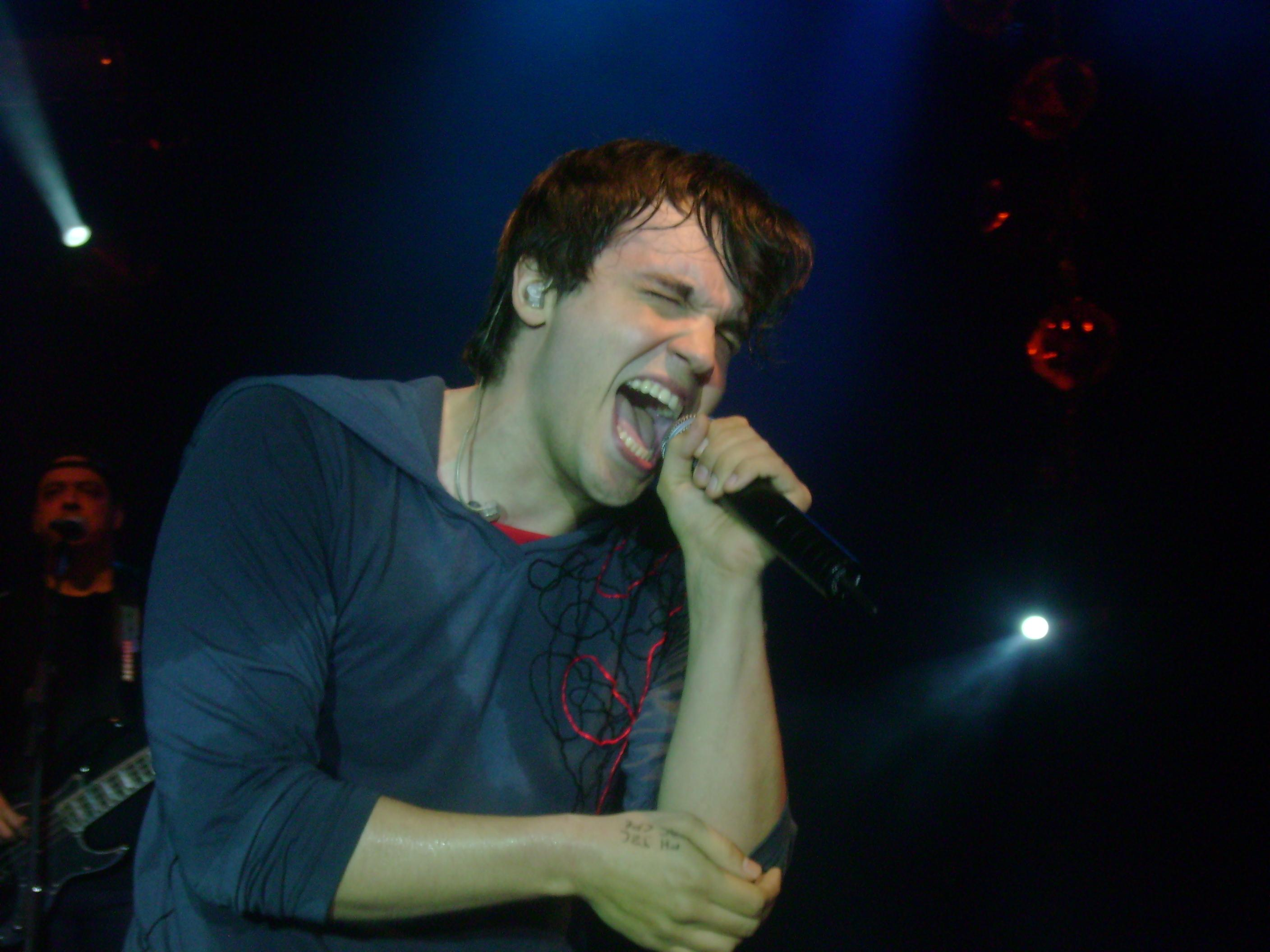

Background information
- Born: Jay Vaquer; 6 February 1975 (age 51)
- Origin: Rio de Janeiro, Brazil
- Genres: Pop, pop rock, world
- Occupations: Singer, songwriter, instrumentalist
- Instrument: Singing
- Years active: 2000–present
- Labels: Jam Music, EMI, Som Livre, Lab 344
- Website: jayvaquer.com.br

Jay Vaquer (born 6 February 1975) is a Brazilian singer and songwriter.

== Biography ==
Vaquer was born in Rio de Janeiro, son of Jay Anthony Vaquer, an American guitarist, brother-in-law and former-partner of Raul Seixas, and a Brazilian singer Jane Duboc.

== Career ==
At the age of 10 he recorded Jingles, and he learned to play guitar. He then became an actor in the Célia Helena Theatre, performing in the musical comedy Cazas de Cazuza in 2000.

After that Jay Vaquer achieved his first popular success in the same year with his first album "Nem Tão São" with the medium-size hit "A Miragem" ("The Mirage") and the second single "Aponta de um Iceberg". The songs only reached respectable positions on the MTV Brasil chart. But the radio stations seemed not to notice the success of the singles (probably a fault of his record label). This might have been the main reason why Jay's career did not launch then.

Four years later, in 2004, Vaquer released his second album "Vendo A Mim Mesmo", and he gained the attention of radio stations with the hit "Pode Agradecer" ("You May Thank Me"), which granted him brief fame. In 2005, Vaquer released his third album "Você Não Me Conhece" with the hit singles "Cotidiano de um Casal Feliz" and "A Falta que a Falta Faz".

Vaquer released his fourth album Formidável Mundo Cão in September 2007. On 5 July, he premiered the first single of this production "Longe Aqui", in his official Myspace.

== Discography ==
- Nem Tão São (2000)
- Vendo A Mim Mesmo (2004) Release date 28 December
- Você Não Me Conhece (2005) Release date 1 November
- Formidável Mundo Cão (2007) Release date 1 September
- aLive in BraZil (CD e DVD) (2009) Release date 1 March
- Umbingobunker!? (2011) Release date 5 August
- Antes da Chuva Chegar - Transversões: Volume 1 (2013) Release date September
- Canções de Exílio - (2016) Release date 3 June
- La Guapa Payola - (2017) Release date 23 June
- Ecos do Acaso e Casos de Caos - (2018) Release date 18 May
