= Chamberlin =

Keyboard instrument

Chamberlin logo

The Chamberlin is an electro-mechanical keyboard instrument that was a precursor to the Mellotron. It was developed and patented by the American inventor Harry Chamberlin from 1949 to 1956, when the first model was introduced. There are several models and versions of the Chamberlin. While most are keyboard-based, there were also early drum machines produced and sold. Some of these drum patterns feature the work of Chamberlin's son Richard.

== Development ==
Harry Chamberlin's idea for the instrument came from recording himself playing an organ and conceiving its playback as entertainment. He designed the first Chamberlin instrument as early as 1949, intended as a home entertainment device for family sing-alongs and playing the big band standards of the day.

The Chamberlin's use as a commercial instrument in rock (or rock and roll) music was not considered, as Harry Chamberlin disliked rock music and rock musicians.

The Chamberlin has a piano-style keyboard. Underneath each key is a tape-playing mechanism. Each tape is prerecorded with various musical instruments or special effects. When the musician presses a key, a pressure pad pushes the tape against a tape head, and a pinch roller beneath the key pulls it forward into storage box (or onto a roller mechanism). The electric signal generated by the tape head is amplified and heard through a loudspeaker. When the player releases the key, the sound stops, and the tape rewinds by either metal spring rods (on the early Chamberlins) or by a return-roller mechanism (on the later M1 models). Each tape is only a few seconds long (eight seconds on many units).

Harry Chamberlin converted a walk-in closet into a home studio and spent considerable time (usually from sunrise to sunset) experimenting with sounds. After modifying the acoustics in the studio, and also in other rooms in his house, the first Chamberlin recordings were made. All Chamberlin recordings were contracted and performed by members of the Lawrence Welk Orchestra throughout the 1950s. Welk was impressed with the idea of a tape playback instrument and offered to fund its manufacture if it was called a "Welk" machine. Chamberlin refused Welk's offer.

Chamberlin used Neumann U47 microphones to record the sounds. The sounds are characterized by a very clean output and heavy vibrato, which was customary of the music styles of the time. The Chamberlin sounds have little compression and possess dynamics true to the instruments recorded on the tapes (such as the air in the flute, or the flow in of the strings). The Chamberlin instruments were designed to accurately replicate the sound of the instrument recorded on the tape. They were meant to be stationary and not transportable, so there was little effort devoted to reliability. Many early Chamberlins have no internal chassis and are prone to go out of adjustment.

As Chamberlin refined the design he began to demonstrate it at music trade shows, and competitors such as Hammond and Lowrey were curious about the origin of Chamberlin sounds. In an effort to compete, these companies created drum rhythms and added plastic tabs with orchestral instrument names on them. These tabs would generate tones that simulated the sound of the instrument selected. The American Federation of Musicians took notice and attempted to limit live performances of Chamberlin instruments fearing that their members would be put out of work. Despite the controversy, musicians worldwide embraced the Chamberlin. "Mack the Knife" singer Bobby Darin was one of the first customers, buying a customized model 300 without the rhythm section tapes. Elvis Presley was also an early owner, occasionally using it for home entertainment.

Chamberlin's company grew by employing his wife, his children, and his window cleaner Bill Franson as his salesman. Franson travelled the country offering the Chamberlin instruments to music stores, parlours, and cocktail lounges. Offers of wider distribution were made, but Harry Chamberlin preferred word of mouth advertising and did not like the terms and conditions of distributorship and eschewed it. Chamberlin favoured doing business directly with lounges, nightclubs and musicians who embraced big band music.

In 1962 Bill Franson went missing for several months. A radio could be heard playing music in his apartment but attempts to contact him proved futile. Franson had left for England by boat taking two Chamberlin 600 models with him (one of these eventually became the possession of Todd Rundgren's studio and appears on XTC's Skylarking album in 1986). Franson placed an ad asking for a company that could manufacture seventy standard playback heads. Bradmatic Ltd. (an engineering company) responded to the ad.

Franson removed the Chamberlin labels and sold the rebadged "Franson" instrument without Harry Chamberlin's knowledge. Refining the 600's design into the Mellotron Mark 1, Bradmatic eventually became Streetly Electronics and began manufacture of the Mellotron Mark 2 in 1963. In 1965 Harry Chamberlin became aware of the fraud after discovering a copy of his instrument being marketed at an American musical instrument trade show. He forced a legal settlement with Streetly Electronics. After visiting owners Frank, Norman, and Les Bradley in person (and having an intense discussion with Franson), an arrangement was made that Mellotrons would only be sold in the UK and Chamberlins would be sold in the US. Chamberlin would receive royalty payments from the Mellotron company, though this apparently ended in the late 1960s. Through this same royalty system, he licensed the Chamberlin "3 violins" sound to be used as the violins sound in the Mellotron library. This sound was used on much of the British Mellotron music since the mid-1960s. Consequently, it can be difficult to tell whether a recording features a Mellotron or Chamberlin when the three violins tapes are used, other than by the country of origin of the recording.

Mistaking Chamberlin sounds for real instruments is common because they were recorded with no processing and because there were fewer mixdown master tapes used compared to the Mellotron library. The M series Chamberlins wide bandwidth playback heads also enhanced fidelity.

Chamberlin instruments were never distributed for sale outside the US and Canada. Chamberlin Co. continued to refine and sell their products, and invested more effort into reliability to compete with the Mellotron. Sales to major US studios resulted in Chamberlins being heard on many pop records of the 1960s including recordings by The Lettermen, Marvin Gaye, Bobby Goldsboro ("Honey" in 1968), The Beach Boys, and educator Edmund Bordeaux Szekely.

A new Chamberlin design emerged in the late 1960s, ending the use of rhythm tapes. This was the much more durable M1 which appeared in 1970 with a flawless tape-return roller system. This model has higher-quality playback tape heads with no tape warble and greater bandwidth than the Mellotron. The unit is a table-top version of the earlier models and much smaller than the competing M400 Mellotron model. About 130 M1 Chamberlins were built.

These musicians included Disneyland/Disney Worlds' live performance artist Michael Iceberg in his shows featuring electronic instruments. Others include Skip Konte with Three Dog Night, Olivia Newton-John, Leon Russell (Carney in 1972), Neil Merryweather, James Taylor, Stevie Wonder, Ambrosia, Mike Pinder with The Moody Blues on the album Seventh Sojourn (1972), American progressive rock band Ethos, David Bowie (from Low in 1977 through Scary Monsters in 1980), Edgar Winter (Jasmine Nightdreams in 1975), Joe South, Iron Butterfly, Chip Taylor, New York session player Barry Frederick, Canadian musicians Joe and Gino Vannelli, jazz/fusion group Shadowfax (Watercourse Way in 1976), and Bob Seger keyboardists Robyn Robbins and Tom Neme.

Chamberlin Co. continued to earn revenue by licensing patents to Mattel for their Optigan keyboard, which uses its prerecorded loop as well as some Chamberlin music tapes in the Optigan library. By the end of the 1970s, digital synths eroded the market for tape-based keyboards and Chamberlin ended M1 production in 1981, building the last few units in an Ontario, California factory, and later in the family garage with previously unreleased sounds. Harry Chamberlin died in 1986.

In the 1980s Chamberlin recordings were minimal but producers Mitchell Froom (Crowded House) and Todd Rundgren (XTC's Skylarking in 1986) used the instrument. The Chamberlin experienced a revival in the 1990s with a new generation of musicians using them and appreciating the unique sounds produced by playing them in unorthodox ways. These included Michael Penn and his keyboardist Patrick Warren (March, Free-for-All, Resigned, MP4 as well as Penn's film scores for Boogie Nights in 1997), singer/songwriter Sam Phillips on her album Cruel Inventions (1991), and singer/songwriter/producer Jon Brion on the soundtrack to the film I Heart Huckabees (2004). Tom Waits also used the instrument on albums such as The Black Rider (1993) and Bone Machine (1992).

== Models ==
Various models exist of the Chamberlin. There are both keyboard-based instruments and drum machines (which are called Rhythmate). Approximately 500–700 units were made, but the exact number is unknown.

Model	Years produced	Number made
Chamberlin 100	1948–1949	4–10
Chamberlin 200	1951–1959	~100
Chamberlin 300/350 remotes	1960–1969	~200
Chamberlin 400	1961	1
Chamberlin 500	1961	2 or 3
Chamberlin 600/660	1962–1969	>200
Chamberlin 25/35/45 Rhythmate	1960–1969	>100
Chamberlin 20/30/40 Rhythmate	1975–1980	>10
Chamberlin 50 Rhythmate	unknown	1 (prototype)
Chamberlin 800 Riviera	1970	2
Chamberlin M1, M2, M4	1970–1981	>100

== Sounds ==
- Keyboards: Marimba, Piano, Vibraphone (with vibrato), Bells (glockenspiel), Organ, Tibia organ, Kinura organ, Harpsichord, Accordion, Electric harpsichord, and Flute/string organ.
- Brass: Trombone, Trumpet, French horn, Do-Wah Trombone, Slur Trombone, and Muted Trumpet.
- Woodwinds: Alto and Tenor saxophones, Flute, Oboe, and Bass clarinet.
- Voice: Male Voice (solo) and Female Voice (solo).
- Strings: 3 Violins, Cello, and Pizzicato Violins.
- Plucked strings: Slur Guitar, Banjo, Steel guitar, Harp Solo, Harp Roll, Harp 7th Arpeggio (harp sounds were not available to the public), Guitar, and Mandolin.
- Effects: Dixieland Band Phrases and Sound Effects.
