= Patrick Warren =

American keyboardist and producer (born 1957)

- Born: March 26, 1957 (age 69); Santa Barbara, California, U.S.
- Occupations: Musician, composer, record producer

Patrick Warren (born March 26, 1957) is an American musician, composer, and record producer. He is known for his work on the films Magnolia, Fifty Shades of Grey, Boogie Nights and Red State, as well as the television series True Detective for which he composed and performed his original music and was awarded an Emmy. He composed the theme song and the original score to the Showtime original series The Chi. As a recording artist, he has worked with Michael Penn, Fiona Apple, the Wallflowers, Eagle-Eye Cherry, Stevie Nicks, and Liz Phair. As a touring musician, he has toured with Bob Dylan, Bruce Springsteen, and Lana Del Rey. He is globally known as an expert Chamberlin artist.

== Chamberlin ==
Warren is an accomplished pianist and keyboardist, who has performed on Grammy Award-winning records and Emmy Award-winning television series, as well as dozens of feature films including Pleasantville and Across the Universe. Warren is also among the top Chamberlin artists in the world. The Chamberlin is an electro-mechanical keyboard that was first introduced in 1948. Warren has played Chamberlin on many records including Michael Penn's hit single "No Myth," Fiona Apple's 1996 debut Tidal, the song "Road Trippin'" by the Red Hot Chili Peppers from their 1999 album Californication, and Lucinda Williams' Down Where the Spirit Meets the Bone from 2014.

== Collaborations ==
With Michael Penn

- March (RCA Records, 1989)
- Free-for-All (RCA Records, 1992)
- Resigned (Epic Records, 1997)
- Mr. Hollywood Jr., 1947 (Mimeograph Records, 2005)

With Nerina Pallot

- Fires (Idaho Records, 2005)

With Michelle Branch

- The Spirit Room (Warner Bros. Records, 2001)
- Hotel Paper (Maverick Records, 2003)

With Taylor Hicks

- Taylor Hicks (Arista Records, 2006)

With Rod Stewart

- Still the Same... Great Rock Classics of Our Time (J Records, 2006)

With Rosanne Cash

- She Remembers Everything (Blue Note Records, 2018)

With Bonnie Raitt

- Slipstream (Redwing Records, 2012)
- Dig In Deep (Redwing Records, 2016)

With LeAnn Rimes

- What a Wonderful World (Asylum Records, 2004)

With Rob Thomas

- Cradlesong (Atlantic Records, 2009)
- Someday (Atlantic Records, 2010)

With Avril Lavigne

- Under My Skin (RCA Records, 2004)

With Tracy Chapman

- Telling Stories (Elektra Records, 2000)
- Let It Rain (Elektra Records, 2002)

With Joe Cocker

- Respect Yourself (EMI, 2002)

With Neil Diamond

- 12 Songs (Columbia Records, 2005)

With Macy Gray

- On How Life Is (Epic Records, 1999)

With Melissa Etheridge

- Breakdown (Island Records, 1999)
- Lucky (Island Records, 2004)

With Fiona Apple

- Tidal (Columbia Records, 1996)
- When the Pawn... (Epic Records, 1999)
- Extraordinary Machine (Epic Records, 2005)

With Sam Phillips

- Omnipop (It's Only a Flesh Wound Lambchop) (Virgin Records, 1996)
- A Boot and a Shoe (Nonesuch Records, 2004)
- Don't Do Anything (Nonesuch Records, 2008)

With Rodney Crowell

- Sex & Gasoline (Yep Roc Records, 2008)

With Aaron Neville

- I Know I've Been Changed (EMI, 2010)

With Lisa Marie Presley

- To Whom It May Concern (Capitol Records, 2003)
- Storm & Grace (Universal Republic, 2008)

With Stevie Nicks

- Trouble in Shangri-La (Reprise Records, 2001)

With Chris Cornell

- Higher Truth (UM, 2015)

With Shelby Lynne

- Love, Shelby (Island Records, 2001)

With Beth Hart

- Screamin' for My Supper (Atlantic Records, 1999)
- Leave the Light On (Warner Bros., Records, 2003)

With Sara Bareilles

- Amidst the Chaos (Epic Records, 2019)

With Marc Cohn

- Join the Parade (Decca Records, 2007)

With Tom Waits

- Bad as Me (Anti-, 2011)

With Aimee Mann

- Bachelor No. 2 or, the Last Remains of the Dodo (V2 Records, 2000)
- Lost in Space (V2 Records, 2002)
- One More Drifter in the Snow (SuperEgo Records, 2006)

With Jewel

- 0304 (Atlantic Records, 2003)

With Ronan Keating

- Fires (Polydor Records, 2012)

With Bob Dylan

- Christmas in the Heart (Columbia Records, 2009)

With Tift Merritt

- Tambourine (Lost Highway Records, 2004)
- Another Country (Fantasy Records, 2008)

With Bruce Springsteen

- Magic (Columbia Records, 2007)
- Working on a Dream (Columbia Records, 2009)
- American Beauty (EP) (Columbia Records, 2014)

With Joan Baez

- Whistle Down the Wind (Proper Records, 2018)

With Graham Nash

- This Path Tonight (Blue Castle, 2016)

With Elisa

- Ritorno al futuro/Back to the Future (Island Records, 2022)
