= 1990 MTV Video Music Awards =

Award ceremony

- Date: Thursday, September 6, 1990
- Location: Universal Amphitheatre, Universal City, California, United States
- Country: United States
- Hosted by: Arsenio Hall
- Most awards: Madonna and Sinéad O'Connor (3 each)
- Most nominations: Madonna (9)

Television/radio coverage
- Network: MTV
- Produced by: Doug Herzog; Gregory Sills
- Directed by: Bruce Gowers

The 1990 MTV Video Music Awards aired live on September 6, 1990, honoring the best music videos from June 2, 1989, to June 1, 1990. The show was hosted by Arsenio Hall at the Universal Amphitheatre in Los Angeles.

This year saw the elimination of yet another one of the show's original categories, Best Stage Performance in a Video. This would turn out to be the last time an award from 1984 would be permanently eliminated (although Breakthrough Video was eliminated in 2006 and then brought back in 2009).

Janet Jackson was presented the Video Vanguard Award for her contributions and influence within music and popular culture. She also performed a controversial rendition of "Black Cat", considered "her first shocking public statement." For the second year in a row, Madonna was one of the night's biggest winners, taking home three technical awards, while Sinéad O'Connor was the other most rewarded artist of 1990, also winning three Moonmen including Video of the Year. Meanwhile, most other winners that night took home two awards, including Aerosmith, Don Henley, The B-52s, Tears for Fears, and MC Hammer.

Regarding nominations, Madonna also had the distinction of being the most nominated artist of the night, as her video for "Vogue" received nine nominations, making it also the most nominated video of 1990. Closely following in nominations came Aerosmith, whose video for "Janie's Got a Gun" earned eight nominations that night and took home two awards, including Viewer's Choice.

== Background ==
MTV announced in late June that the 1990 Video Music Awards would be held on September 6 at the Universal Amphitheatre in Los Angeles, with Arsenio Hall returning as host. Nominees were announced on July 10. The ceremony marked the first time that MTV self-produced the awards show. The ceremony was preceded by a 90-minute preshow. Hosted by Downtown Julie Brown, Ed Lover, Doctor Dré, Ray Cokes, and Kurt Loder, the broadcast featured red carpet interviews, pre-taped features on the nominees, and interviews with Axl Rose and Jon Bon Jovi excerpted from Famous Last Words with Kurt Loder.

== Performances ==
List of musical performances
| Artist(s) | Song(s) | Ref. |
|---|---|---|
| Janet Jackson | "Black Cat" | |
| Mötley Crüe | "Don't Go Away Mad (Just Go Away)" | |
| MC Hammer | "Let's Get It Started" "U Can't Touch This" | |
| INXS | "Suicide Blonde" | |
| Sinéad O'Connor | "Nothing Compares 2 U" | |
| New Edition; Bell Biv DeVoe; Bobby Brown; Johnny Gill; Ralph Tresvant | Medley "Poison" (Bell Biv DeVoe only) "Tap Into My Heart" (Bobby Brown only) "Rub You the Right Way" (Johnny Gill only) "Sensitivity" (Ralph Tresvant only) "If It Isn't Love" "Mr. Telephone Man" "Can You Stand the Rain" | |
| Faith No More | "Epic" | |
| Phil Collins | "Sussudio" | |
| 2 Live Crew | "Banned in the U.S.A." | |
| World Party | "Put the Message in the Box" | |
| Aerosmith | "Love in an Elevator" | |
| Madonna | "Vogue" | |

== Presenters ==
=== Main show ===
- Don Henley – presented Best Female Video
- Robert Downey Jr. – presented Best Video from a Film
- Pauly Shore – appeared in a pre-commercial vignette about Viewer's Choice voting procedures
- Living Colour – presented Best New Artist in a Video
- Martha Quinn – appeared in a pre-commercial vignette telling viewers what was 'coming up' on the show
- Rachel Ward and Isiah Thomas – presented Best Choreography in a Video
- Downtown Julie Brown – appeared in a pre-commercial vignette about Viewer's Choice voting procedures
- Oliver Stone – presented Best Direction in a Video
- Daisy Fuentes and Jordan Brady – appeared in a pre-commercial vignette telling viewers what was 'coming up' on the show
- Kim Basinger – presented Best Dance Video
- Nia Peeples – appeared in a pre-commercial vignette telling viewers what was 'coming up' on the show
- Billy Idol – presented Best Group Video
- Ken Ober – appeared in a pre-commercial vignette about Viewer's Choice voting procedures
- Sherilyn Fenn and Michael Ontkean – presented Breakthrough Video and Best Post-Modern Video
- Fab Five Freddy – briefly interviewed MC Hammer in a pre-commercial vignette and told viewers what was 'coming up' on the show
- Eric Bogosian – briefly spoke about censorship in the U.S. and introduced 2 Live Crew
- Christina Applegate and David Faustino – presented Best Metal/Hard Rock Video
- Riki Rachtman – appeared in a pre-commercial vignette telling viewers what was 'coming up' on the show
- Curt Smith (from Tears for Fears) and Wilson Phillips – introduced the International Viewer's Choice Award winners
- VJs Richard Wilkins (Australia), Astrid Fontenelle (Brasil), Maiken Wexø (Europe), Daisy Fuentes (Internacional) and Dionne Mitsuoka (Japan) – announced their respective region's Viewer's Choice winner
- Susan Dey and David Cassidy – presented Viewer's Choice
- Ray Cokes – briefly introduced Brazilian Viewer's Choice winners Titãs before a commercial break and told viewers what was 'coming up' on the show
- Flavor Flav and Queen Latifah – presented Best Rap Video
- Magic Johnson – presented the Video Vanguard Award
- Ed Lover and Doctor Dré – appeared in a pre-commercial vignette telling viewers what was 'coming up' on the show
- Paula Abdul – presented Best Male Video and paid tribute to Stevie Ray Vaughan who died in a helicopter crash
- Mike Patton – was interviewed briefly by Downtown Julie Brown before a commercial break
- Cher – presented Video of the Year

=== Post-show ===
- Kurt Loder – introduced the winners of the professional categories

== Winners and nominees ==
Winners are in bold text.

| Video of the Year | Best Male Video |
|---|---|
| **Sinéad O'Connor – "Nothing Compares 2 U"**; Aerosmith – "Janie's Got a Gun"; Don Henley – "The End of the Innocence"; Madonna – "Vogue" | **Don Henley – "The End of the Innocence"**; Billy Idol – "Cradle of Love"; MC Hammer – "U Can't Touch This"; Michael Penn – "No Myth" |
| Best Female Video | Best Group Video |
| **Sinéad O'Connor – "Nothing Compares 2 U"**; Paula Abdul – "Opposites Attract"; Madonna – "Vogue"; Alannah Myles – "Black Velvet"; Michelle Shocked – "On the Greener Side" | **The B-52s – "Love Shack"**; Aerosmith – "Janie's Got a Gun"; Midnight Oil – "Blue Sky Mine"; Red Hot Chili Peppers – "Higher Ground"; Tears for Fears – "Sowing the Seeds of Love" |
| Best New Artist in a Video | Best Metal/Hard Rock Video |
| **Michael Penn – "No Myth"**; Bell Biv DeVoe – "Poison"; The Black Crowes – "Jealous Again"; Jane Child – "Don't Wanna Fall in Love"; Lenny Kravitz – "Let Love Rule"; Alannah Myles – "Black Velvet"; Lisa Stansfield – "All Around the World" | **Aerosmith – "Janie's Got a Gun"**; Faith No More – "Epic"; Mötley Crüe – "Kickstart My Heart"; Slaughter – "Up All Night" |
| Best Rap Video | Best Dance Video |
| **MC Hammer – "U Can't Touch This"**; Digital Underground – "The Humpty Dance"; Biz Markie – "Just a Friend"; Young MC – "Principal's Office" | **MC Hammer – "U Can't Touch This"**; Paula Abdul – "Opposites Attract"; Janet Jackson – "Rhythm Nation"; Madonna – "Vogue" |
| Best Post-Modern Video | Best Video from a Film |
| **Sinéad O'Connor – "Nothing Compares 2 U"**; Depeche Mode – "Personal Jesus"; Red Hot Chili Peppers – "Higher Ground"; Tears for Fears – "Sowing the Seeds of Love" | **Billy Idol – "Cradle of Love" (from The Adventures of Ford Fairlane)**; Edie Brickell & New Bohemians – "A Hard Rain's a-Gonna Fall" (from Born on the Fourth of July); Prince – "Batdance" (from Batman); ZZ Top – "Doubleback" (from Back to the Future Part III) |
| Breakthrough Video | Best Direction in a Video |
| **Tears for Fears – "Sowing the Seeds of Love"**; Paula Abdul – "Opposites Attract"; Sinéad O'Connor – "Nothing Compares 2 U"; Red Hot Chili Peppers – "Higher Ground" | **Madonna – "Vogue" (Director: David Fincher)**; Paula Abdul – "Opposites Attract" (Directors: Michael Patterson and Candace Reckinger); Aerosmith – "Janie's Got a Gun" (Director: David Fincher); Don Henley – "The End of the Innocence" (Director: David Fincher) |
| Best Choreography in a Video | Best Special Effects in a Video |
| **Janet Jackson – "Rhythm Nation" (Choreographers: Janet Jackson and Anthony Thomas)**; Paula Abdul – "Opposites Attract" (Choreographer: Paula Abdul); Madonna – "Vogue" (Choreographers: Luis Camacho and Jose Gutierrez); MC Hammer – "U Can't Touch This" (Choreographers: MC Hammer and Ho Frat Hooo!) | **Tears for Fears – "Sowing the Seeds of Love" (Special Effects: Jim Blashfield)**; Paula Abdul – "Opposites Attract" (Special Effects: Michael Patterson); Billy Idol – "Cradle of Love" (Special Effects: Peter Moyer); Billy Joel – "We Didn't Start the Fire" (Special Effects: Chris Blum) |
| Best Art Direction in a Video | Best Editing in a Video |
| **The B-52s – "Love Shack" (Art Director: Martin Lasowitz)**; Aerosmith – "Janie's Got a Gun" (Art Director: Alex McDowell); Billy Joel – "We Didn't Start the Fire" (Art Director: Sterling Storm); Madonna – "Vogue" (Art Director: Lauryn LeClere) | **Madonna – "Vogue" (Editor: Jim Haygood)**; Aerosmith – "Janie's Got a Gun" (Editor: Jim Haygood); Don Henley – "The End of the Innocence" (Editor: Jim Haygood); MC Hammer – "U Can't Touch This" (Editor: Jonathan Siegel) |
| Best Cinematography in a Video | Viewer's Choice |
| **Madonna – "Vogue" (Director of Photography: Pascal Lebègue)**; Aerosmith – "Janie's Got a Gun" (Director of Photography: Dariusz Wolski); Don Henley – "The End of the Innocence" (Director of Photography: David Bridges); Billy Joel – "We Didn't Start the Fire" (Director of Photography: Sven Kirsten) | **Aerosmith – "Janie's Got a Gun"**; Don Henley – "The End of the Innocence"; Madonna – "Vogue"; Sinéad O'Connor – "Nothing Compares 2 U" |
| International Viewer's Choice: MTV Australia | International Viewer's Choice: MTV Brasil |
| **Midnight Oil – "Blue Sky Mine"**; Boom Crash Opera – "Onion Skin"; Max Q – "Sometimes"; Kylie Minogue – "Better the Devil You Know" | **Titãs – "Flores"**; Djavan – "Oceano"; Engenheiros do Hawaii – "Alívio Imediato"; Os Paralamas do Sucesso – "Perplexo"; Caetano Veloso – "Estrangeiro" |
| International Viewer's Choice: MTV Europe | International Viewer's Choice: MTV Internacional |
| **The Creeps – "Ooh I Like It"**; Laid Back – "Bakerman"; Gary Moore – "Still Got the Blues (For You)"; Sinéad O'Connor – "Nothing Compares 2 U" | **Gloria Estefan – "Oye Mi Canto"**; Franco De Vita – "Louis"; Los Prisioneros – "Tren al Sur"; Soda Stereo – "En la Ciudad de la Furia" |
| International Viewer's Choice: MTV Japan | |
**Kome Kome Club – "Funk Fujiyama"**; Yasuyuki Okamura – "Vegetable"; Jun Togawa – "Virgin Blues"; Mami Yamase – "Go!"
Video Vanguard Award
**Janet Jackson**

== Artists with multiple wins and nominations ==
Artists who received multiple awards
| Wins | Artist |
|---|---|
| 3 | Madonna |
| 3 | Sinéad O'Connor |
| 2 | Aerosmith |
| 2 | Janet Jackson |
| 2 | MC Hammer |
| 2 | The B-52s |
| 2 | Tears for Fears |

Artists who received multiple nominations
| Nominations | Artist |
|---|---|
| 9 | Madonna |
| 8 | Aerosmith |
| 6 | Don Henley |
| 6 | Paula Abdul |
| 6 | Sinéad O'Connor |
| 5 | MC Hammer |
| 4 | Tears for Fears |
| 3 | Billy Idol |
| 3 | Billy Joel |
| 3 | Red Hot Chili Peppers |
| 2 | Alannah Myles |
| 2 | Janet Jackson |
| 2 | Michael Penn |
| 2 | Midnight Oil |
| 2 | The B-52s |

== Music Videos with multiple wins and nominations ==
Music Videos that received multiple awards
| Wins | Artist | Music Video |
|---|---|---|
| 3 | Madonna | "Vogue" |
| 3 | Sinéad O'Connor | "Nothing Compares 2 U" |
| 2 | Aerosmith | "Janie's Got a Gun" |
| 2 | MC Hammer | "U Can't Touch This" |
| 2 | Tears for Fears | "Sowing the Seeds of Love" |
| 2 | The B-52s | "Love Shack" |

Music Videos that received multiple nominations
| Nominations | Artist | Music Video |
|---|---|---|
| 9 | Madonna | "Vogue" |
| 8 | Aerosmith | "Janie's Got a Gun" |
| 6 | Don Henley | "The End of the Innocence" |
| 6 | Paula Abdul | "Opposites Attract" |
| 6 | Sinéad O'Connor | "Nothing Compares 2 U" |
| 5 | MC Hammer | "U Can't Touch This" |
| 4 | Tears for Fears | "Sowing the Seeds of Love" |
| 3 | Billy Idol | "Cradle of Love" |
| 3 | Billy Joel | "We Didn't Start the Fire" |
| 3 | Red Hot Chili Peppers | "Higher Ground" |
| 2 | Alannah Myles | "Black Velvet" |
| 2 | Janet Jackson | "Rhythm Nation" |
| 2 | Michael Penn | "No Myth" |
| 2 | Midnight Oil | "Blue Sky Mine" |
| 2 | The B-52s | "Love Shack" |
