= Rafael Gayol =

American drummer (born 1958)

Rafael Bernardo Gayol
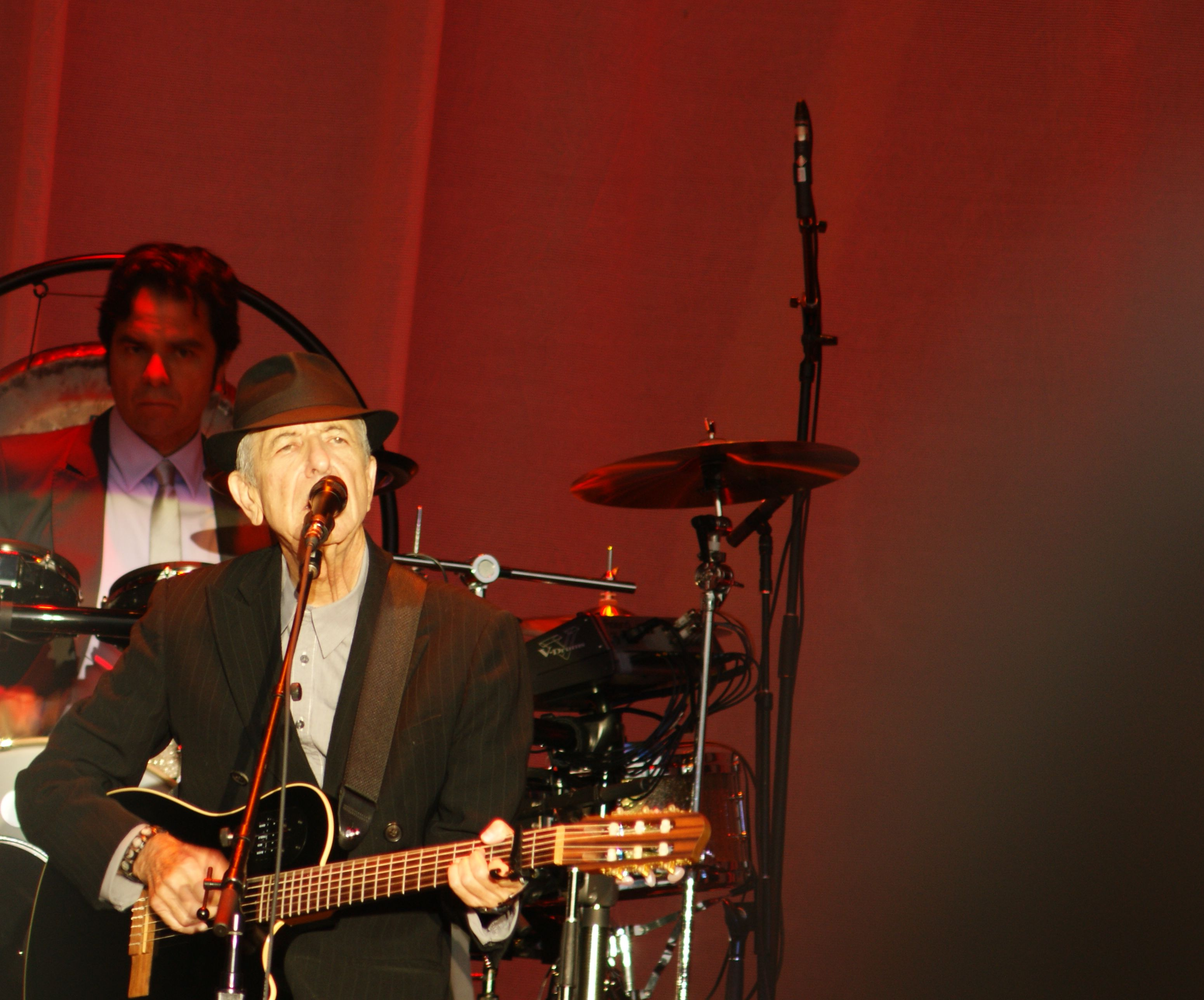
- Gayol (left) performing with Leonard Cohen on 2012.

Background information
- Born: Rafael Bernardo Gayol; July 13, 1958 (age 67)
- Origin: Mexico City, Mexico
- Genres: Rock
- Occupations: Musician, film composer, voice-over
- Instruments: Drums, percussion, backing vocals
- Years active: 1982–present

Rafael Bernardo Gayol (born July 13, 1958) is an American drummer. He is best known for his work with singer-songwriter Leonard Cohen, and with such diverse artists as Charlie Sexton, BoDeans, Robbie Robertson, A-ha, Shawn Colvin, Bob Schneider, Tito & Tarantula, Billy Harvey, Robert Rodriguez, Patty Griffin, David Rice, Joe Ely, Kelly Willis, Bruce Robison, Tish Hinojosa, Jon Dee Graham, The Flatlanders, Colin Gilmore, Eliza Gilkyson, Patricia Vonne, Scott Gibson, Tonio K, Bascom Hill, Mason Ruffner, Trish Murphy, Michael Thomas, Maggie Walters and Doll Congress.

== Equipment ==
Gayol plays Drum Workshop drums, Paiste cymbals, Vater drumsticks and brushes and Remo drumheads.

== Brief discography ==
- 2015 ~ Leonard Cohen ~ Can't Forget ~ A Souvenir of the Grand Tour ~ Columbia/Sony
- 2014 ~ Leonard Cohen ~ Live In Dublin ~ Columbia/Sony/CD/DVD
- 2012 ~ Leonard Cohen ~ "Old Ideas" ~ Columbia/Sony
- 2010 ~ Leonard Cohen ~ Songs From The Road ~ Columbia/Sony/CD/DVD
- 2010 ~ Bleu Edmondson ~ The Future Ain't What It Used To Be ~ American Saint Records
- 2010 ~ Scott Gibson ~ Just Keep Drivin ~ Independent
- 2009 ~ Leonard Cohen ~ Live In London ~ Columbia/Sony/CD/DVD
- 2008 ~ Leonard Cohen ~ Live In Fredericton ~ Columbia/Sony
- 2008 ~ Tito and Tarantula ~ Return To The Darkness ~ It Sounds/EMI
- 2007 ~ Michael Thomas ~ Independent
- 2006 ~ Bob Schneider ~ The Californian ~ Vanguard
- 2005 ~ Bascom Hill ~ Maybe / Trish Murphy ~ Girls Get In Free ~ Valley Records / Patricia Vonne ~ Guitars and Castinets
- 2004 ~ Bob Schneider ~ I'm Good Now ~ Vanguard / Joe Ely ~ Streets of Sin ~ Rounder / Billy Harvey ~ Pie ~
- 2002 ~ The Flatlanders ~ Now Again ~ New West / Kelly Willis ~ Easy ~ Rykodisc
- 1999 ~ Kelly Willis ~ What I Deserve ~ Rykodisc / Jon Dee Graham ~ Summerland ~ New West
- 1998 ~ David Rice ~ Green Electric ~ Columbia
- 1997 ~ Trish Murphy ~ Crooked Mile / Kacy Crowley ~ Anchorless ~ Atlantic / Jon Dee Graham ~ Escape from Monster Island ~ New West
- 1995 ~ Charlie Sexton Sextet ~ Under The Wishing Tree ~ MCA
- 1993 ~ BoDeans ~ Joe Dirt Car ~ Reprise
- 1992 ~ Sun 60 ~ Epic
- 1991 ~ BoDeans - Black and White ~ Reprise
- 1989 ~ A-ha ~ Live In Rio ~ Warner/Globo/DVD
