= Mr. Hollywood =

Mr. Hollywood may refer to:

- Charles E. Toberman, real estate developer
- Cecil B. DeMille, film mogul
- Petter Solberg, rally and rallycross driver
- Slang for show business workers, especially those who work on films.

== Music ==
- Mr. Hollywood Jr., 1947, album by Michael Penn
- "Mr. Hollywood", song by Joji from Nectar, 2020
