= Doll Congress =

American alternative rock band

Doll Congress was an American 1980s alternative rock band from Los Angeles. Its members were Michael Penn (guitar, vocals, production), Gabriele Morgan (vocals, clarinet), Patrick Warren (keyboards), Larry Rott (bass, vocals), and Rafael Gayol (who then went by the name Danny Gayol, drums). They began in 1981 as Gabriele Morgan and Doll Congress, following the release of an EP by Gabriele Morgan that featured Michael Penn on guitar and bass, but quickly shortened the band's name to Doll Congress as Michael Penn took over some of the lead vocals and shared the songwriting with Gabriele Morgan.

The band was popular locally, but found it difficult to spread this success any further. Doll Congress released two records, including the 1983 self-titled 12" record on the Enigma Records label, with three songs: a cover of "Concrete and Clay" (originally by Unit 4 + 2), and two originals; "Easy to Touch" sung by Morgan and "The Main" sung by Penn. "The Main" featured the steady beating of a suspended steel pipe for percussion, which was often used in their live performances. They also had two tracks on the soundtrack to the teen flick,Welcome to 18, released in 1986: "Give Up Your Ghost" and "I Will Be Around".

They played their last gig in February 1987. Michael Penn made his first solo LP for RCA Records titled March, released in 1989, which featured six songs written and performed during his time in Doll Congress.
