= No Myth =

Single by Michael Penn

from the album March
- Released: November 1989
- Recorded: 1989
- Genre: Pop rock
- Length: 4:10 (Album version); 4:11 (Single/radio version)
- Label: RCA
- Songwriter: Michael Penn
- Producer: Tony Berg

Michael Penn singles chronology
"No Myth" (1989)	"This & That" (1990)

"No Myth" is a song by American rock singer Michael Penn, released in November 1989 by RCA Records, as his debut single from his debut album, March (1989). The song became Penn's only top-40 hit on the US Billboard Hot 100 and Cash Box Top 100 charts, peaking at numbers 13 and 14. A vintage electro-mechanical keyboard instrument (called the Chamberlin) was used by Penn's long-time musical collaborator Patrick Warren in the song and can be seen in the video as well.

On the back of the success of "No Myth", Penn won the MTV Award for Best New Artist, making him the first male solo artist to win this award. However, label reshuffling stunted his momentum. He explained, "I had a big hit with it, and then the president of the label who signed me is gone and the record dies. The day after winning the award they canceled the next video."

Penn's wife and musician Aimee Mann included the song on her list of "songs that made her," explaining: "By 1990, everything on the radio was starting to be Whitney Houston, Taylor Dayne, Tina Turner—it was very pop. Then Michael Penn comes out with this Beatles-esque, melodic song, but still with a little bit of a big snare drum sound. I was like, “Finally, somebody broke through with an actual song.” It was on that tour [around Penn's album, March] when I met Michael for the first time, and then we vaguely kept in touch. We got together years later. I love 'No Myth.' And that record is fantastic from beginning to end. You may think I'm saying this because I'm a nice person who is supportive of their spouse. That's absolutely not true. I'm not that supportive."

The song plays over the final montage and end credits of Amy Heckerling's 2000 romantic comedy Loser.

== Track listing ==
- CD single
1. "No Myth" (Edited version) - 4:11
2. "Big House" - 2:57
3. "No Myth" (Damascus mix) - 4:45

== Charts ==
=== Weekly charts ===
Chart (1990)	Peak position
Australia (ARIA)	24
Belgium (Ultratop Flanders)	46
Italy Airplay (Music & Media)	15
Netherlands (Dutch Top 40 Tipparade)	7
Netherlands (Single Top 100)	48
US Billboard Hot 100	13
US Adult Contemporary (Billboard)	22
US Mainstream Rock Tracks (Billboard)	5
US Modern Rock Tracks (Billboard)	4
US Cash Box Top 100	14

=== Year-end charts ===
Chart (1990)	Position
Canada Top Singles (RPM)	59
