= MTV Video Music Award for Best New Artist =

Annual music video award

- Sienna Spiro is the most recent recipient
- Country: United States
- Presented by: MTV
- First award: 1984
- Currently held by: Sienna Spiro (2026)

Highlights
- Most nominations: Cyndi Lauper (2)
- Website: VMA website

The MTV Video Music Award for Best New Artist has been given out since the first annual MTV Video Music Awards in 1984. Until 2006, the award was named Best New Artist in a Video. In 2007 its name was changed to Best New Artist, as the category underwent a format change to recognize the artist's body of work for the full year rather than a specific video. For the 2008 ceremony, the award retained its 2007 name but returned to the format of awarding a specific video rather than the artist's full body of work. This is the only award where voting closes during the ceremony.

The category was later renamed Artist to Watch through 2013 to 2015 while still keeping the format of an award going to a particular video. In 2020, the Best New Artist award merged with the Push Artist of the Year award (2018-2019) to create the Push Best New Artist award. In 2021, MTV returned the category to its original name (Best New Artist), thus separating it from the MTV Push initiative, which again received its own category (Push Performance of the Year).

== Winners and nominees ==
†Marks winners of the Grammy Award for Best New Artist

*Marks nominees of the Grammy Award for Best New Artist

=== 1980s ===
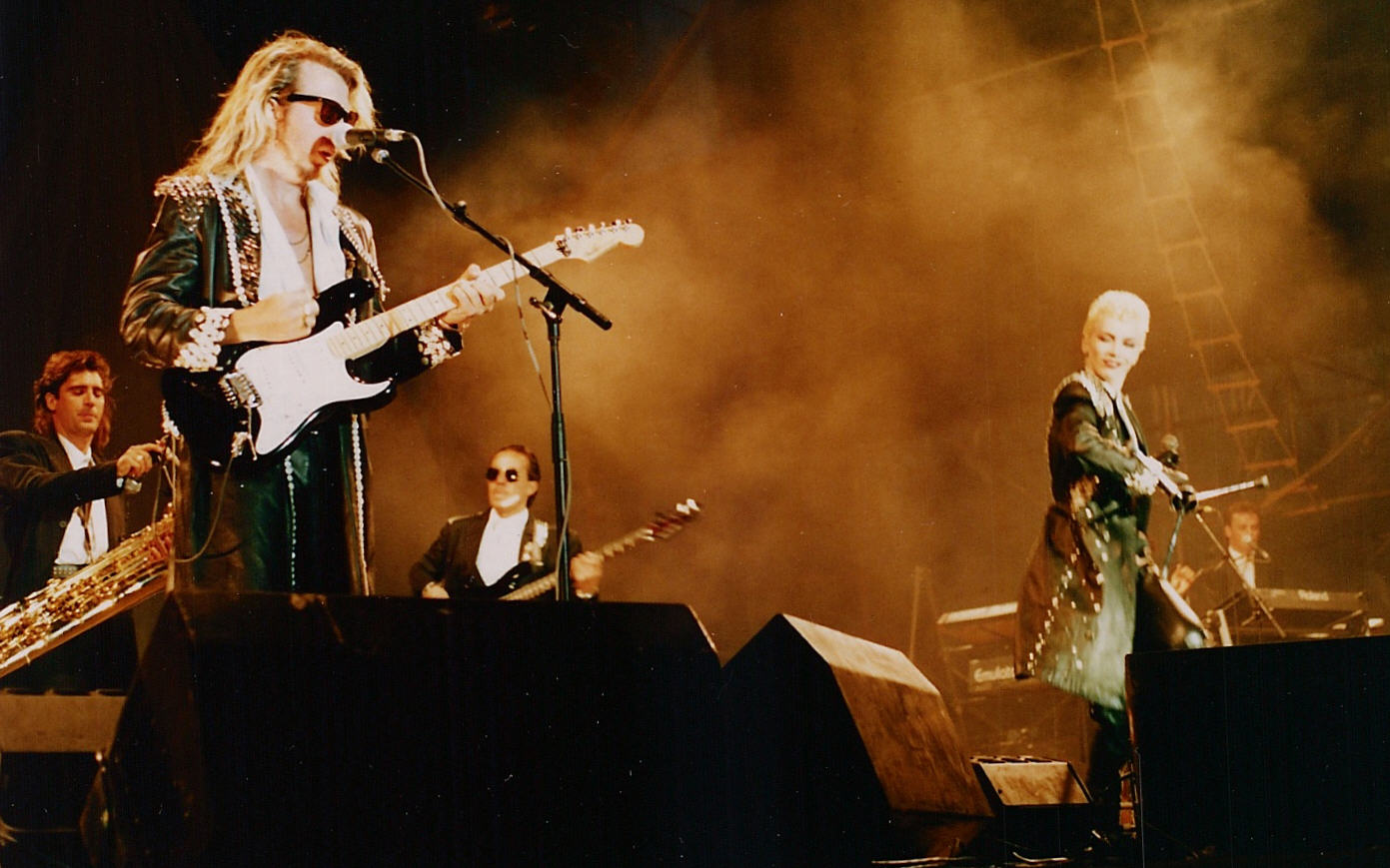
Inaugural winner Eurythmics

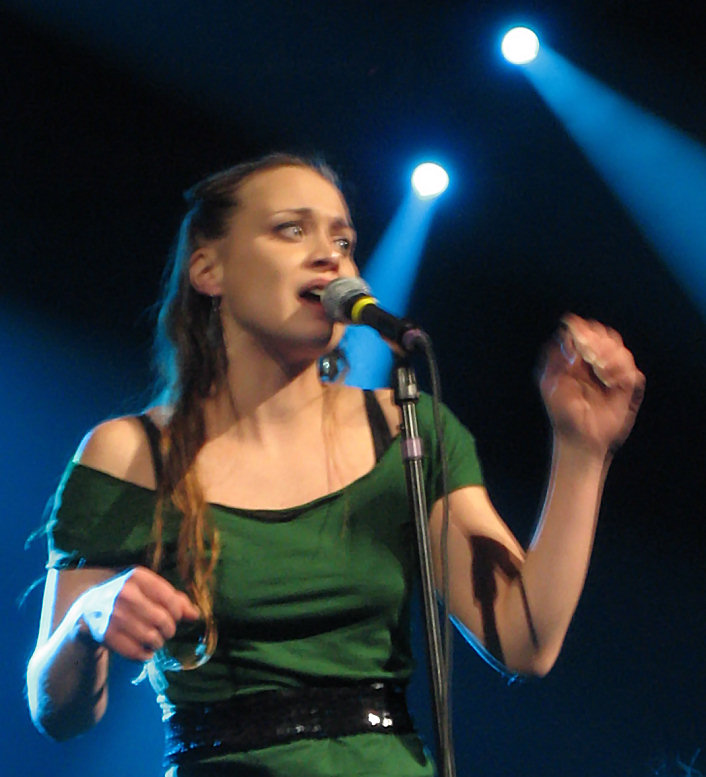
1997 award winner Fiona Apple

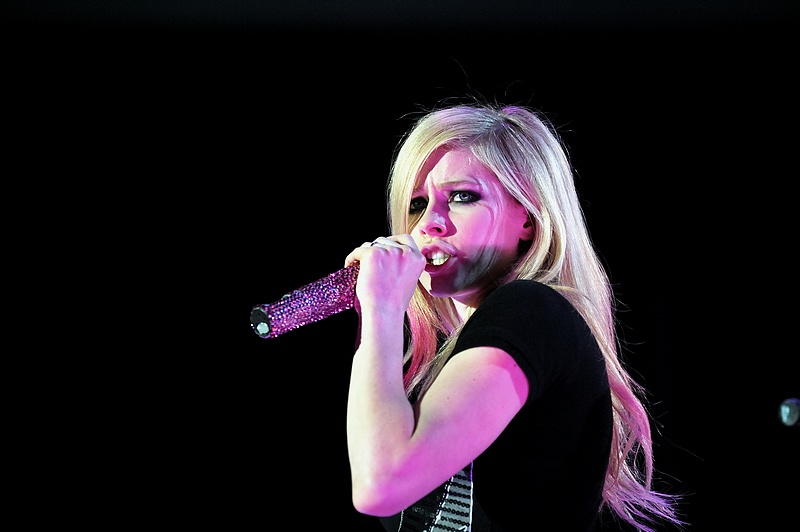
2002 award winner Avril Lavigne

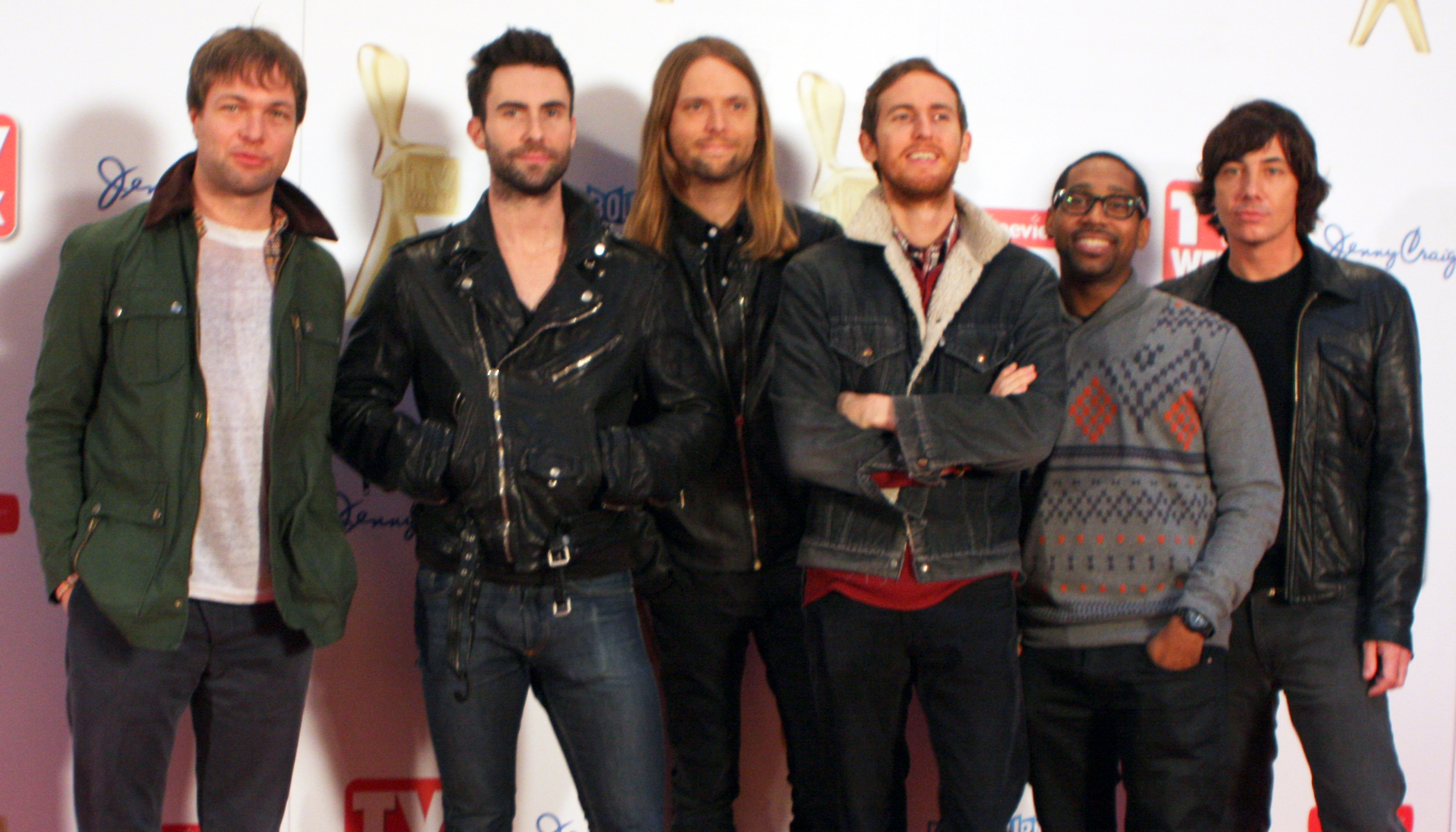
2004 award winner Maroon 5

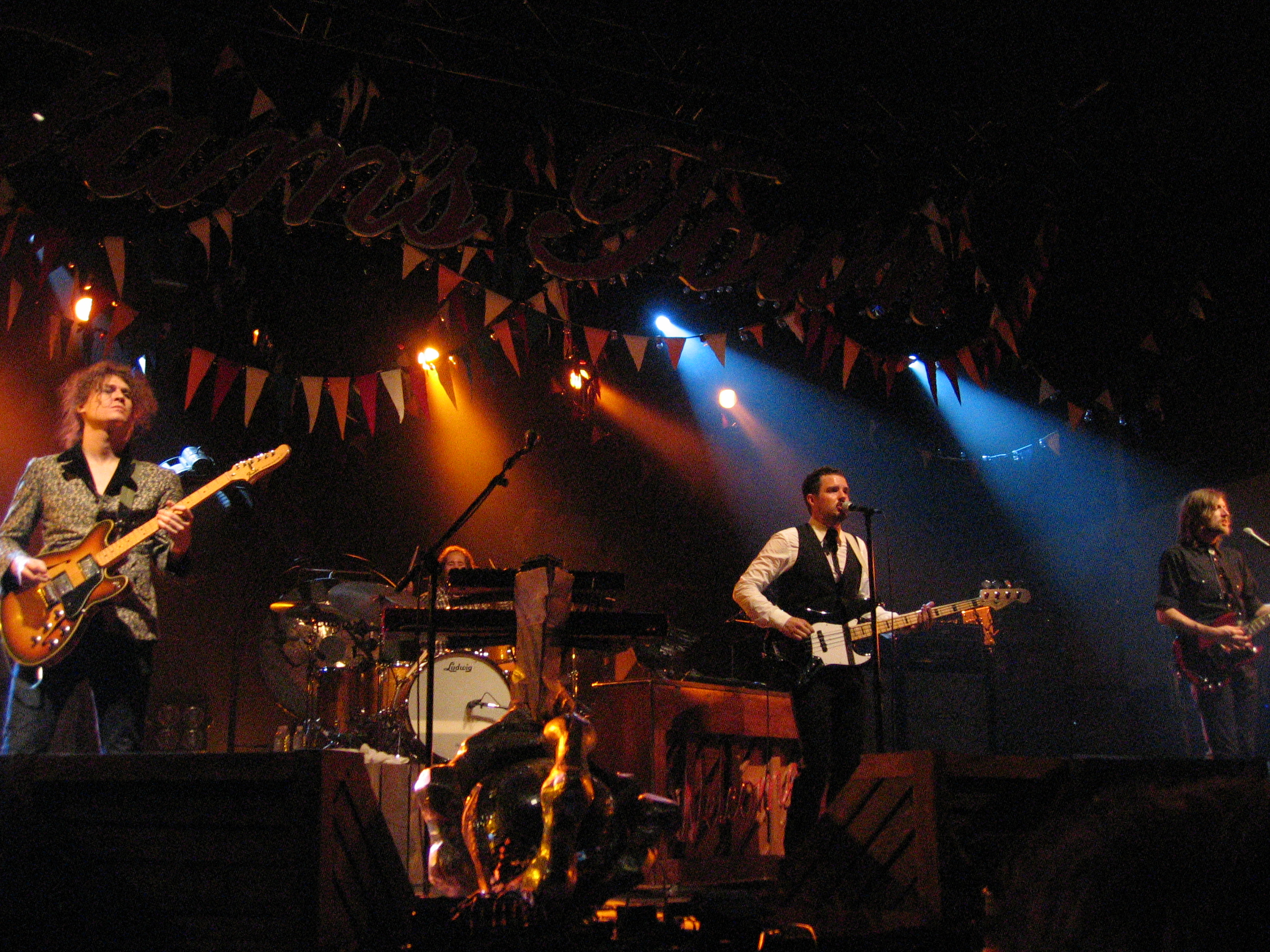
2005 awards winner The Killers

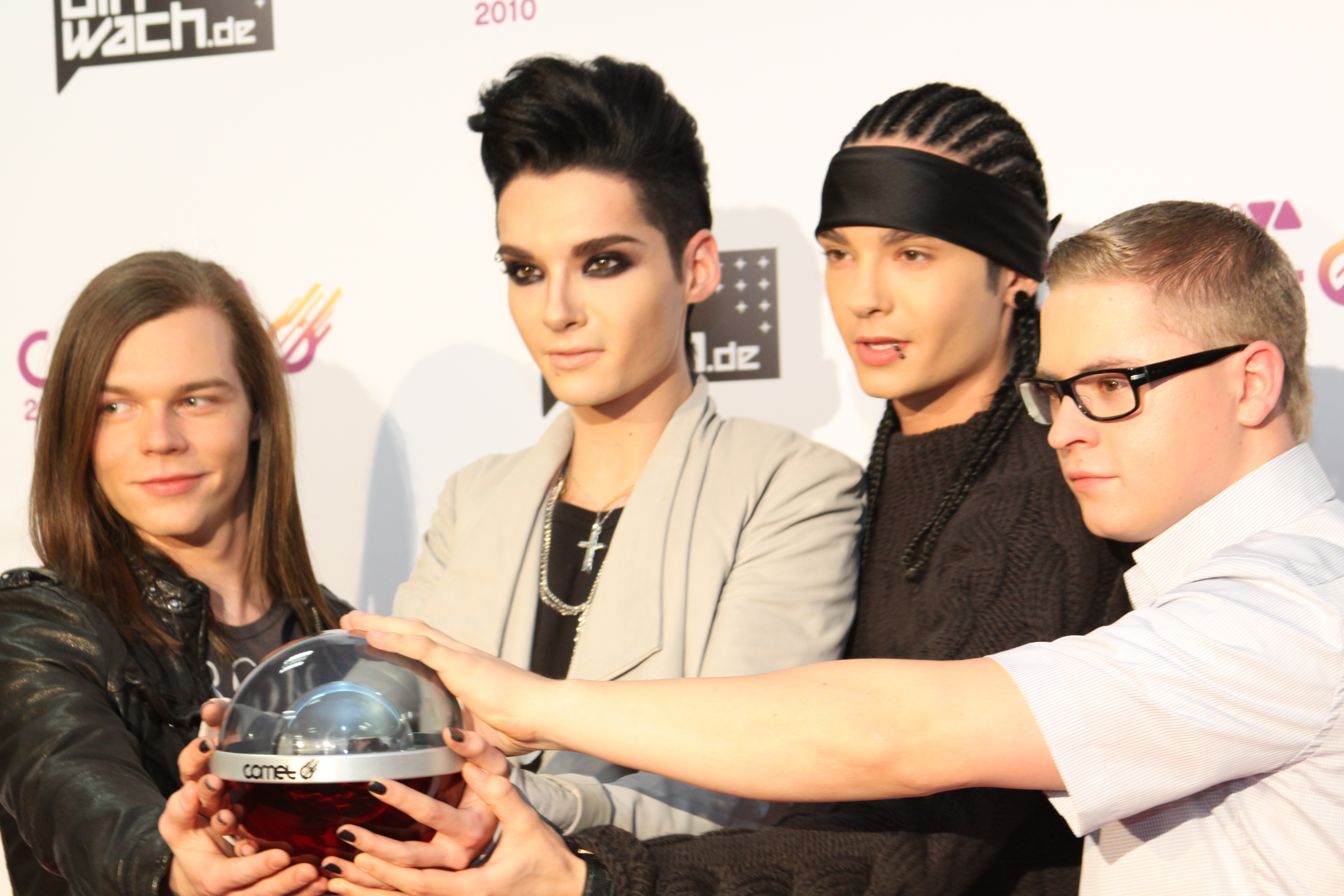
2008 award winner Tokio Hotel

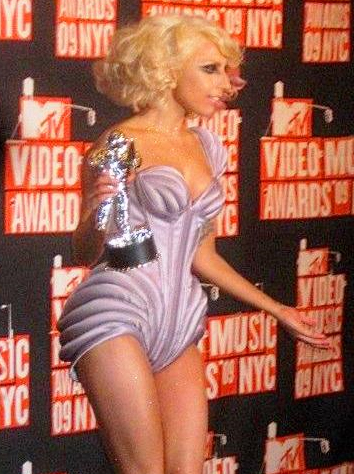
2009 award winner Lady Gaga

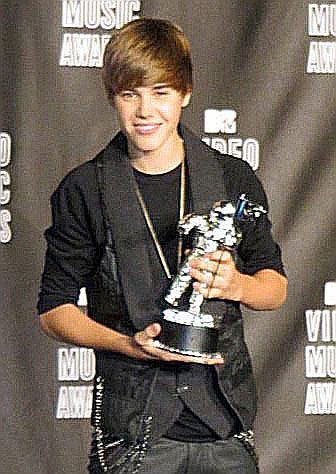
2010 award winner Justin Bieber

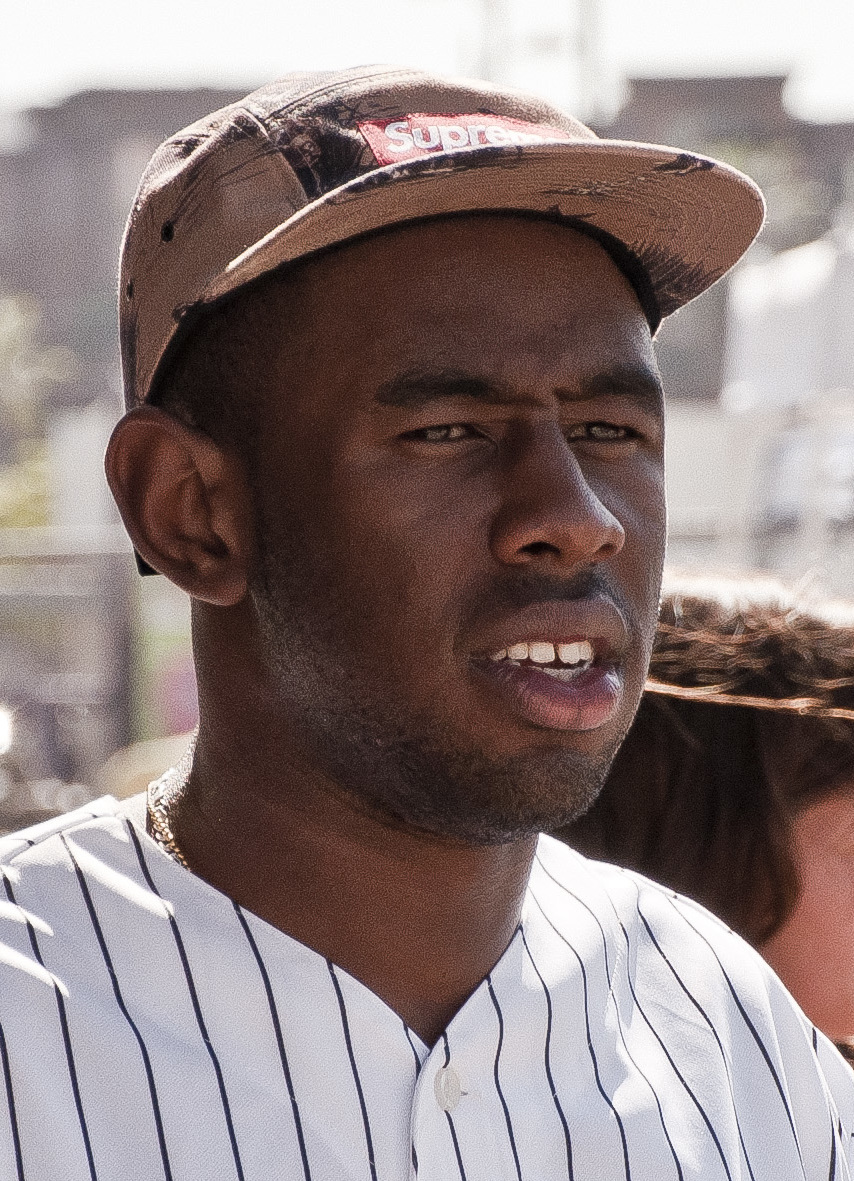
2011 award winner Tyler, The Creator

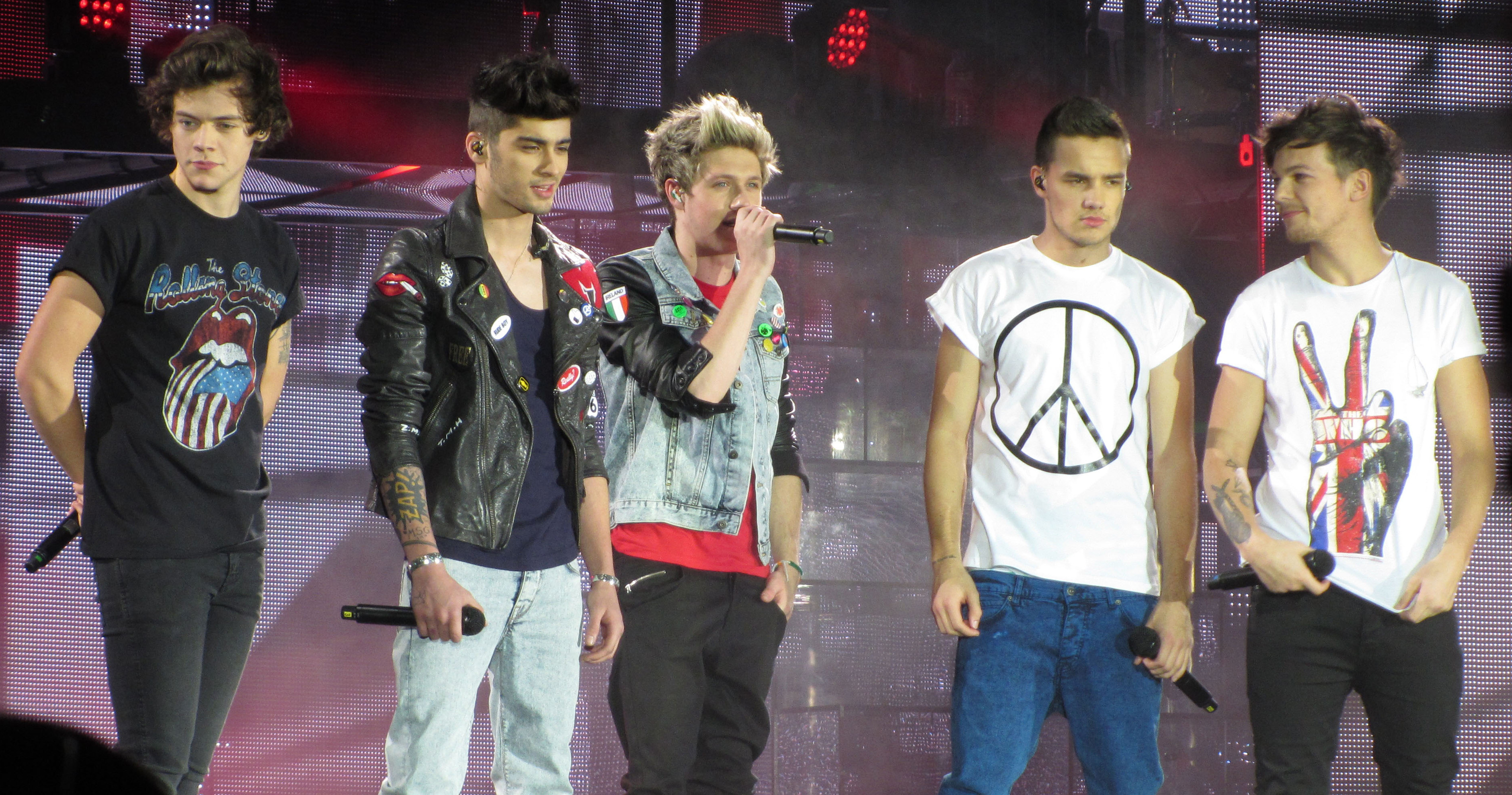
2012 award winner One Direction

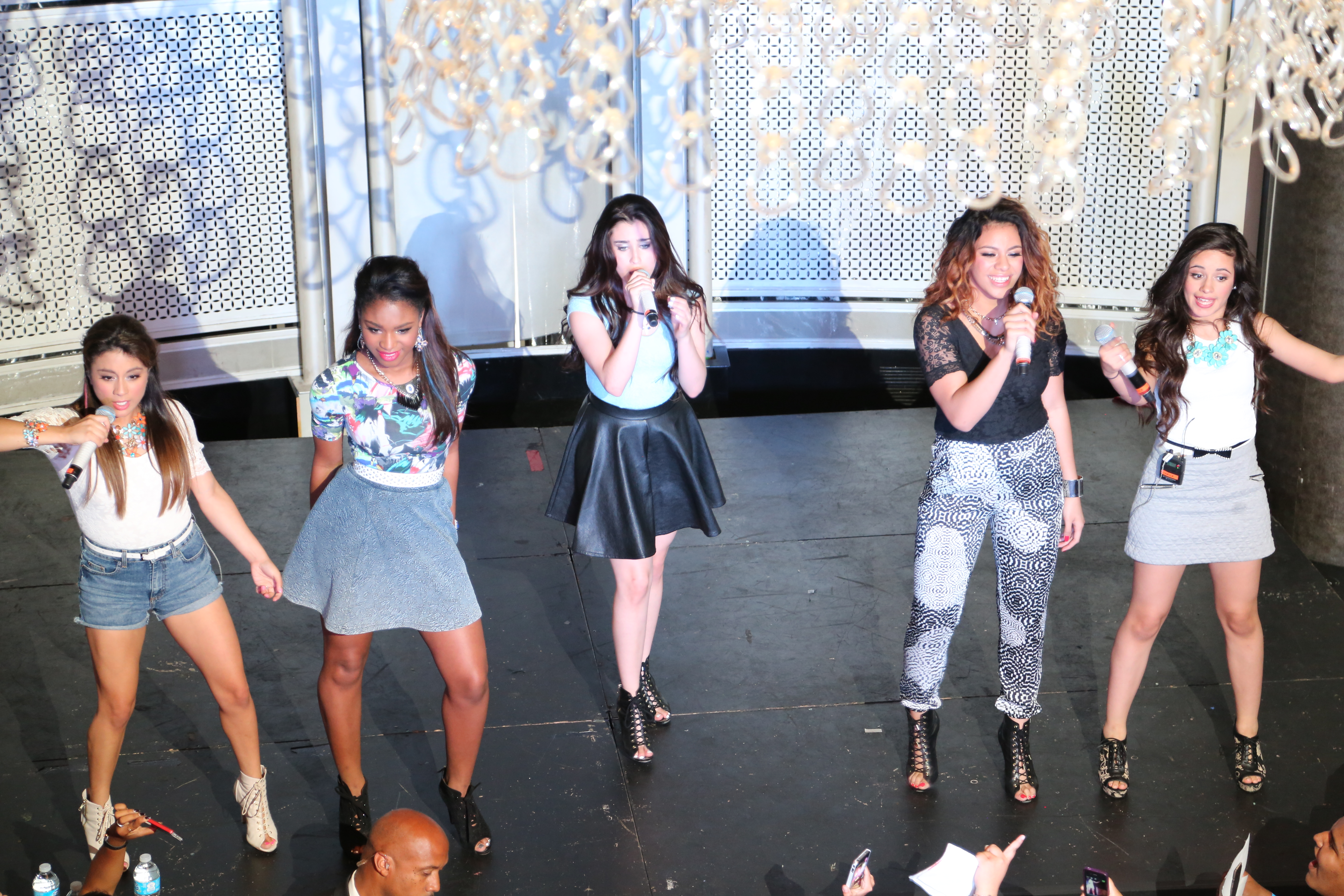
2014 award winner Fifth Harmony

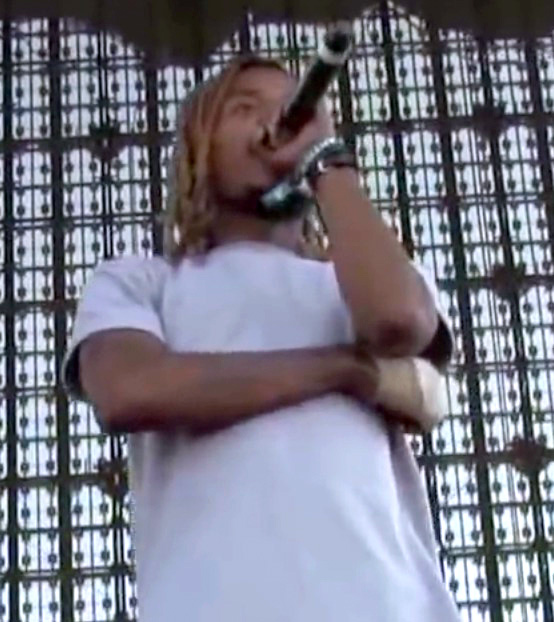
2015 award winner Fetty Wap

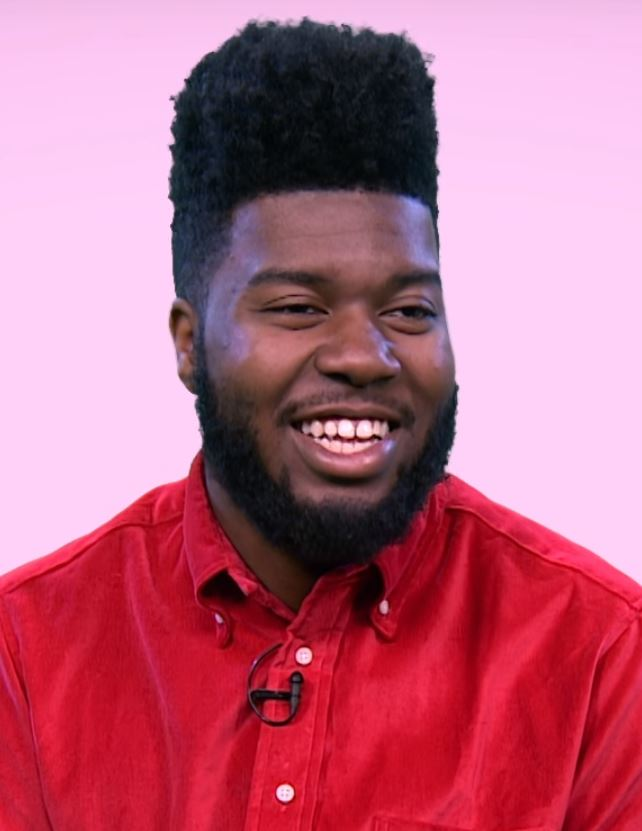
2017 award winner Khalid

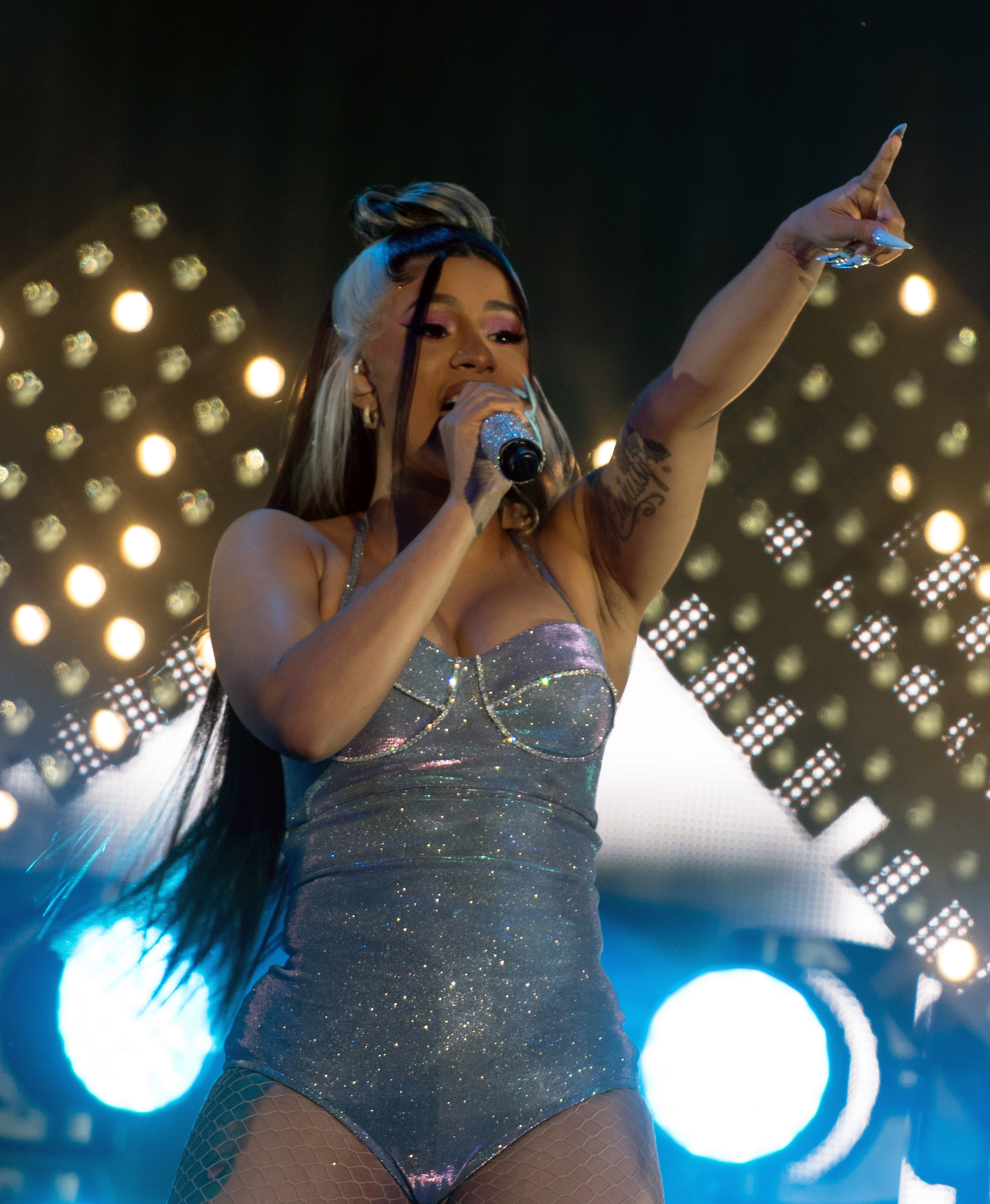
2018 award winner Cardi B

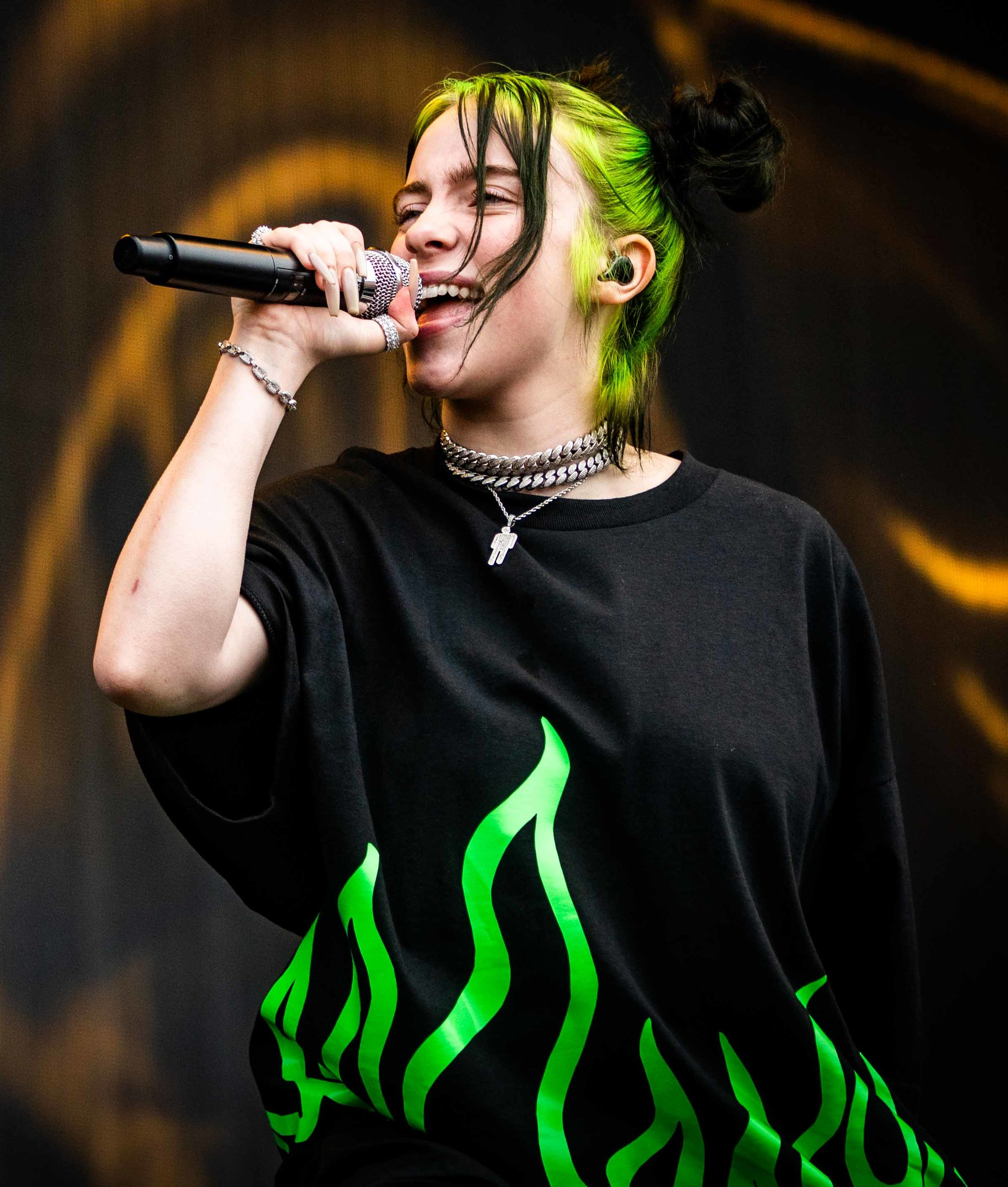
2019 award winner Billie Eilish

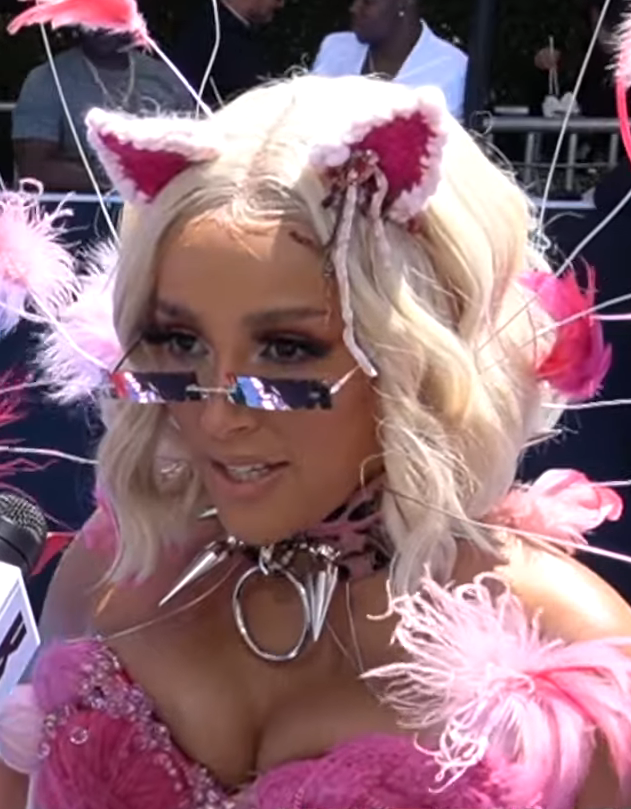
2020 award winner Doja Cat

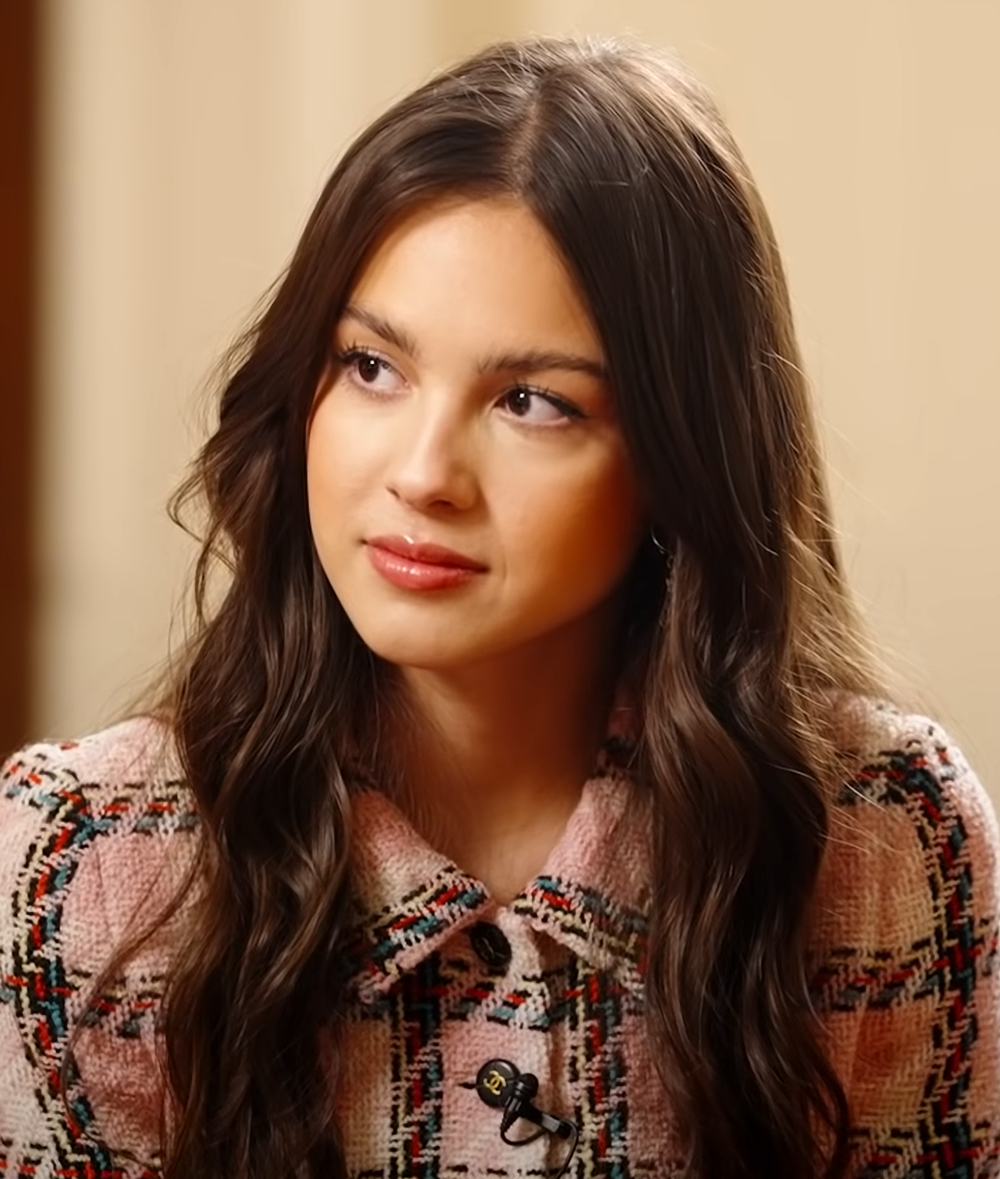
2021 award winner Olivia Rodrigo

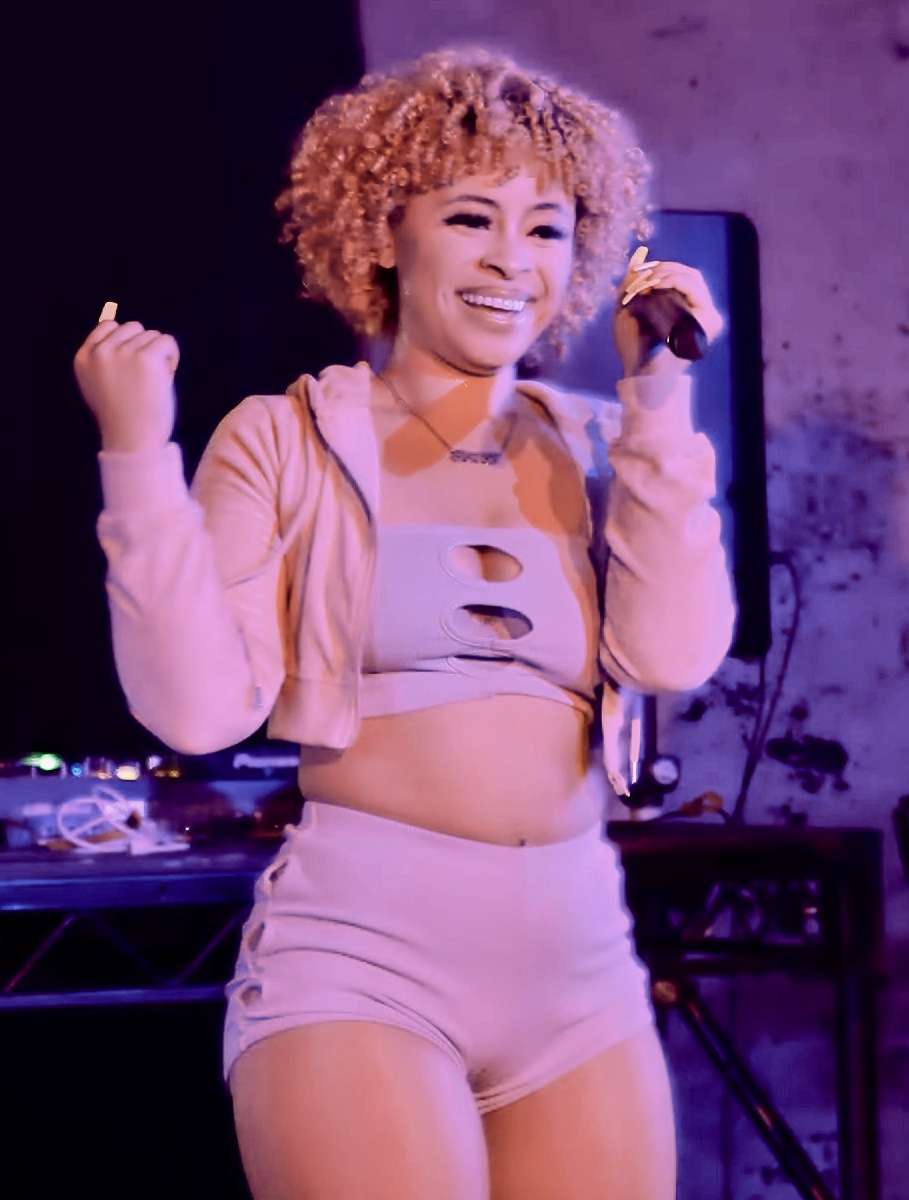
2023 award winner Ice Spice

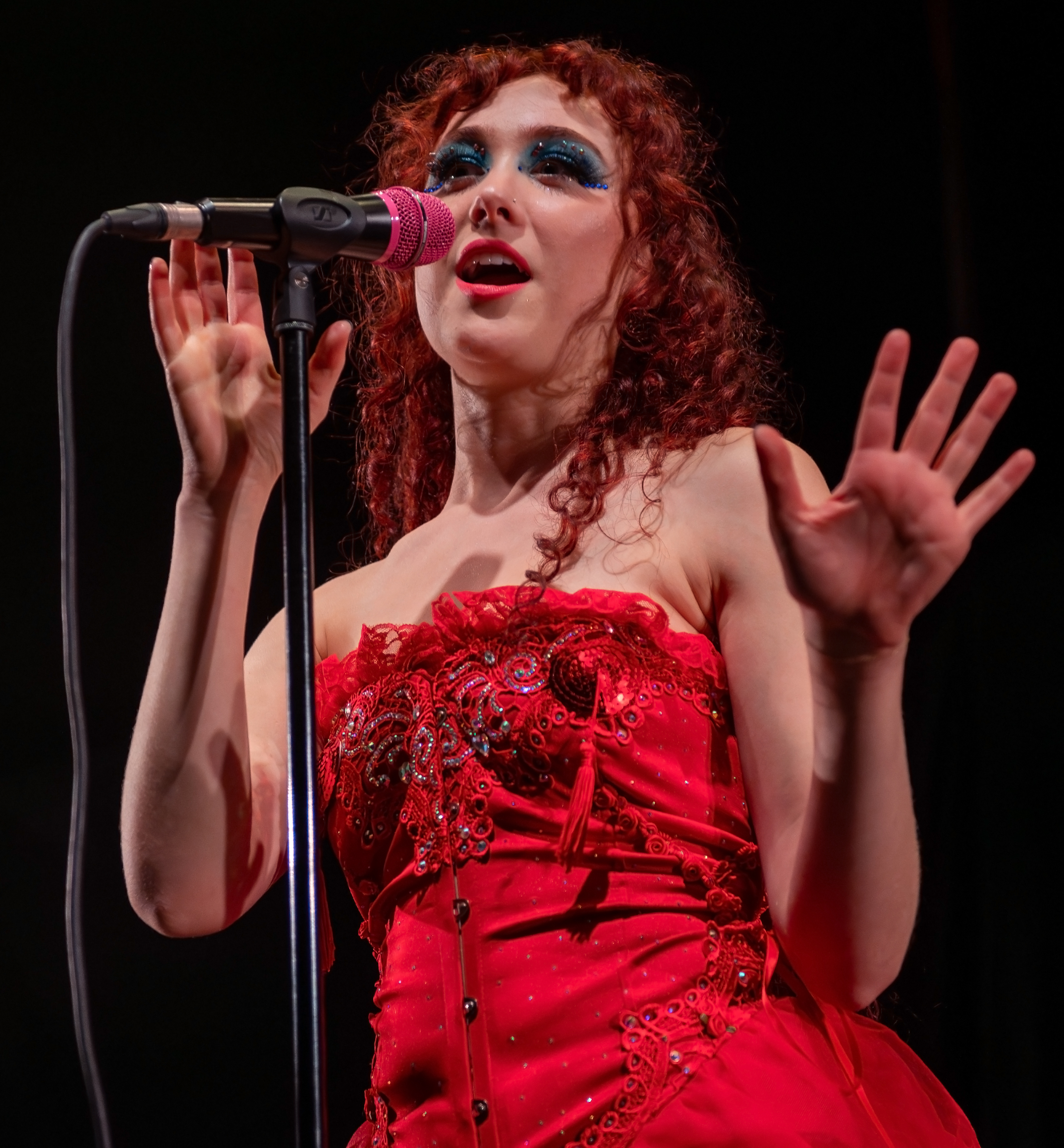
2024 award winner Chappell Roan

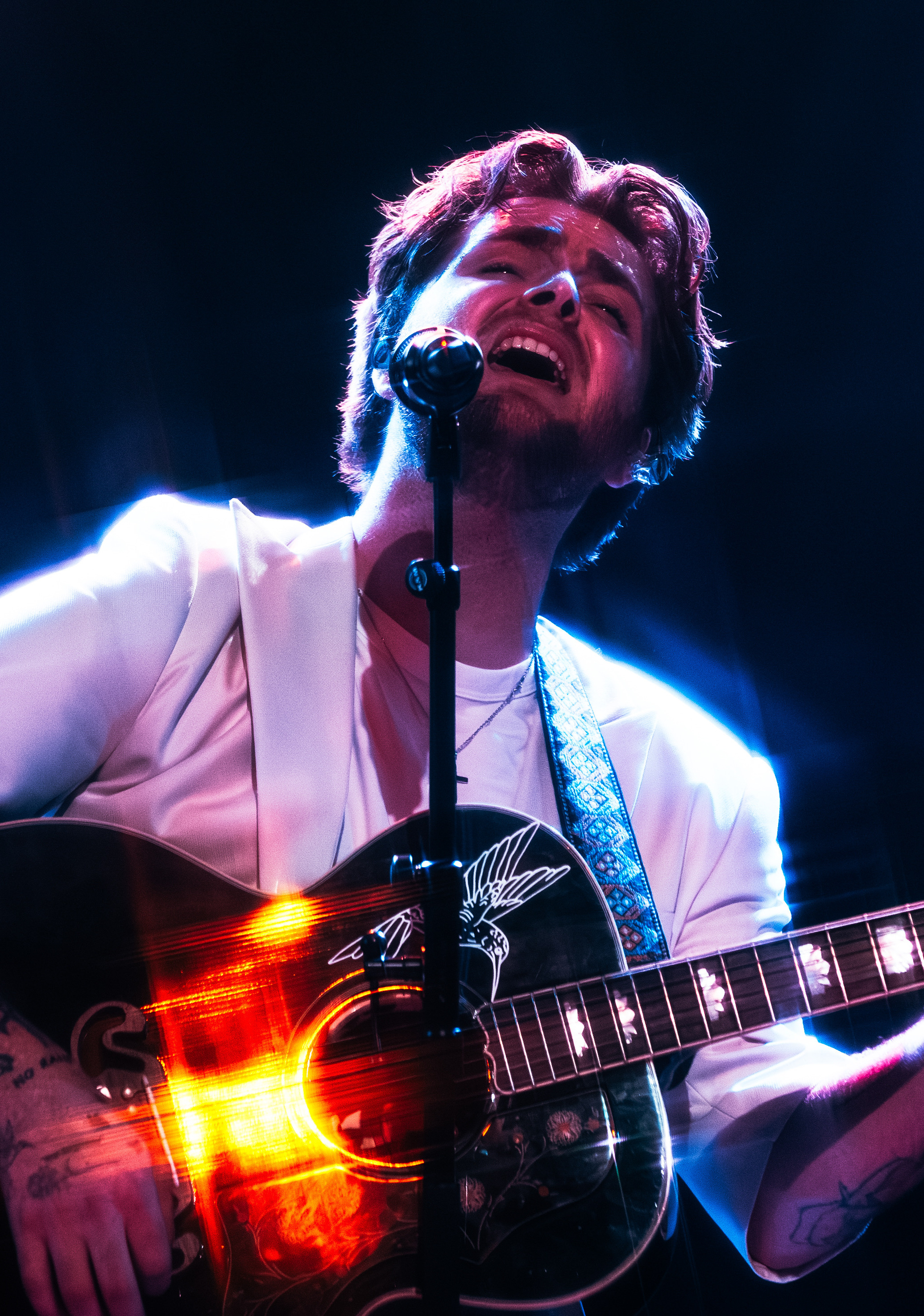
2025 award winner Alex Warren

Recipients
Year (Note: Each year is linked to the article about the MTV Video Music Awards held that year.)	Winner(s)	Nominees	Ref.
1984	Eurythmics – "Sweet Dreams (Are Made of This)"*	Cyndi Lauper – "Girls Just Want to Have Fun"†; Cyndi Lauper – "Time After Time"†; Madonna – "Borderline"; Wang Chung – "Dance Hall Days"	
1985	'Til Tuesday – "Voices Carry"	Frankie Goes to Hollywood – "Two Tribes"*; Julian Lennon – "Too Late for Goodbyes"*; Sade – "Smooth Operator"†; Sheila E. – "The Glamorous Life"*	
1986	A-ha – "Take On Me"*	The Hooters – "And We Danced"; Whitney Houston – "How Will I Know"; Pet Shop Boys – "West End Girls"; Simply Red – "Holding Back the Years"*	
1987	Crowded House – "Don't Dream It's Over"	Robert Cray – "Smoking Gun"; The Georgia Satellites – "Keep Your Hands to Yourself"; Bruce Hornsby and the Range – "The Way It Is"†; Timbuk3 – "The Future's So Bright, I Gotta Wear Shades"*	
1988	Guns N' Roses – "Welcome to the Jungle"	The Godfathers – "Birth, School, Work, Death"; Buster Poindexter – "Hot, Hot, Hot"; Swing Out Sister – "Breakout"*; Jody Watley – "Some Kind of Lover"†	
1989	Living Colour – "Cult of Personality"	Paula Abdul – "Straight Up"; Edie Brickell & New Bohemians – "What I Am"; Neneh Cherry – "Buffalo Stance"*	

=== 1990s ===
Recipients
Year	Winner(s)	Nominees	Ref.
1990	Michael Penn – "No Myth"	Bell Biv DeVoe – "Poison"; The Black Crowes – "Jealous Again"*; Jane Child – "Don't Wanna Fall in Love"; Lenny Kravitz – "Let Love Rule"; Alannah Myles – "Black Velvet"; Lisa Stansfield – "All Around the World"*	
1991	Jesus Jones – "Right Here, Right Now"	C+C Music Factory – "Gonna Make You Sweat (Everybody Dance Now)"*; Deee-Lite – "Groove Is in the Heart"; Gerardo – "Rico Suave"; Seal – "Crazy"*	
1992	Nirvana – "Smells Like Teen Spirit"	Tori Amos – "Silent All These Years"; Arrested Development – "Tennessee"†; Cracker – "Teen Angst (What the World Needs Now)"	
1993	Stone Temple Pilots – "Plush"	Tasmin Archer – "Sleeping Satellite"; Belly – "Feed the Tree"*; Porno for Pyros – "Pets"	
1994	Counting Crows – "Mr. Jones"*	Beck – "Loser"; Björk – "Human Behaviour"; Green Day – "Longview"*; Lisa Loeb and Nine Stories – "Stay (I Missed You)"; Me'Shell NdegéOcello – "If That's Your Boyfriend (He Wasn't Last Night)"	
1995	Hootie & the Blowfish – "Hold My Hand"†	Jeff Buckley – "Last Goodbye"; Des'ree – "You Gotta Be"; Filter – "Hey Man, Nice Shot"; Portishead – "Sour Times (Nobody Loves Me)"	
1996	Alanis Morissette – "Ironic"*	Tracy Bonham – "Mother Mother"; Garbage – "Stupid Girl"*; Jewel – "Who Will Save Your Soul"*	
1997	Fiona Apple – "Sleep to Dream"*	Meredith Brooks – "Bitch"; Hanson – "MMMBop"*; Jamiroquai – "Virtual Insanity"; The Wallflowers – "One Headlight"	
1998	Natalie Imbruglia – "Torn"*	Cherry Poppin' Daddies – "Zoot Suit Riot"; Chumbawamba – "Tubthumping"; Fastball – "The Way"; Mase – "Feel So Good"	
1999	Eminem – "My Name Is"	Kid Rock – "Bawitdaba"*; Jennifer Lopez – "If You Had My Love"; Orgy – "Blue Monday"	

=== 2000s ===
Recipients
Year	Winner(s)	Nominees	Ref.
2000	Macy Gray – "I Try"*	Christina Aguilera – "What a Girl Wants"†; Papa Roach – "Last Resort"*; Pink – "There You Go"; Sisqó – "Thong Song"*	
2001	Alicia Keys – "Fallin'" †	Coldplay – "Yellow"; Nikka Costa – "Like a Feather"; David Gray – "Babylon"*; Sum 41 – "Fat Lip"	
2002	Avril Lavigne – "Complicated"*	Ashanti – "Foolish"*; B2K – "Uh Huh"; John Mayer – "No Such Thing"*; Puddle of Mudd – "Blurry"	
2003	50 Cent – "In da Club"*	The All-American Rejects – "Swing, Swing"; Kelly Clarkson – "Miss Independent"; Evanescence (featuring Paul McCoy) – "Bring Me to Life"†; Sean Paul – "Get Busy"*; Simple Plan – "Addicted"	
2004	Maroon 5 – "This Love"†	The Darkness – "I Believe in a Thing Called Love"; Jet – "Are You Gonna Be My Girl"; JoJo – "Leave (Get Out)"; Kanye West (featuring Syleena Johnson) – "All Falls Down"*; Yellowcard – "Ocean Avenue"	
2005	The Killers – "Mr. Brightside"	Ciara (featuring Missy Elliott) – "1, 2 Step"*; The Game – "Dreams"; John Legend – "Ordinary People"†; My Chemical Romance – "Helena"	
2006	Avenged Sevenfold – "Bat Country"	Angels & Airwaves – "The Adventure"; James Blunt – "You're Beautiful"*; Chris Brown (featuring Juelz Santana) – "Run It!"*; Panic! at the Disco – "I Write Sins Not Tragedies"; Rihanna – "SOS"	
2007	Gym Class Heroes	Lily Allen; Peter Bjorn and John; Carrie Underwood†; Amy Winehouse†	
2008	Tokio Hotel – "Ready, Set, Go!"	Miley Cyrus – "7 Things"; Katy Perry – "I Kissed a Girl"; Jordin Sparks (featuring Chris Brown) – "No Air"; Taylor Swift – "Teardrops on My Guitar"*	
2009	Lady Gaga – "Poker Face"	3OH!3 – "Don't Trust Me"; Drake – "Best I Ever Had"*; Kid Cudi – "Day 'n' Nite"; Asher Roth – "I Love College"	

=== 2010s ===
Recipients
Year	Winner(s)	Nominees	Ref.
2010	Justin Bieber (featuring Ludacris) – "Baby"*	Broken Bells – "The Ghost Inside"; Jason Derülo – "In My Head"; Ke$ha – "Tik Tok"; Nicki Minaj (featuring Sean Garrett) – "Massive Attack"*	
2011	Tyler, the Creator – "Yonkers"	Big Sean (featuring Chris Brown) – "My Last"; Foster the People – "Pumped Up Kicks"; Kreayshawn – "Gucci Gucci"; Wiz Khalifa – "Black and Yellow"	
2012	One Direction – "What Makes You Beautiful"	fun. (featuring Janelle Monáe) – "We Are Young"†; Carly Rae Jepsen – "Call Me Maybe"; Frank Ocean – "Swim Good"*; The Wanted – "Glad You Came"	
2013	Austin Mahone – "What About Love"	Iggy Azalea – "Work"*; Twenty One Pilots – "Holding On to You"; The Weeknd – "Wicked Games"; Zedd (featuring Foxes) – "Clarity"	
2014	Fifth Harmony – "Miss Movin' On"	5 Seconds of Summer – "She Looks So Perfect"; Charli XCX – "Boom Clap"; Schoolboy Q – "Man of the Year"; Sam Smith – "Stay with Me"†	
2015	Fetty Wap — "Trap Queen"	James Bay — "Hold Back the River"*; George Ezra — "Budapest"; FKA Twigs — "Pendulum"; Vance Joy — "Riptide" (Runner-Up)	
2016	DNCE	Desiigner; Zara Larsson; Lukas Graham; Bryson Tiller (Runner-Up)	
2017	Khalid*	Noah Cyrus*; Kodak Black; Julia Michaels (Runner-Up)*; SZA*; Young M.A	
2018	Cardi B	Bazzi; Chloe x Halle*; Hayley Kiyoko (Runner-up); Lil Pump; Lil Uzi Vert*	
2019	Billie Eilish†	Ava Max; H.E.R.*; Lil Nas X*; Lizzo (Runner-up)*; Rosalía*	

=== 2020s ===
Recipients
Year	Winner(s)	Shortlist	Nominees (Note: Artists that were eliminated during the primary voting rounds.)	PUSH Longlist (Note: Artists that were selected candidates for the award but did not make the final nominations.)	Ref.
2020	Doja Cat*	Lewis Capaldi; Yungblud	Jack Harlow; Roddy Ricch; Tate McRae	AJ Mitchell; Arizona Zervas; Ava Max; BENEE; Brockhampton; Conan Gray; Finneas*; Kiana Ledé; Lil Tecca; Pop Smoke; Summer Walker	
2021	Olivia Rodrigo†	The Kid Laroi*	24kGoldn; Giveon; Polo G; Saweetie*	—N/a	
2022	Dove Cameron	Måneskin*; Seventeen	Baby Keem*; Gayle; Latto*	—N/a	
2023	Ice Spice*	Peso Pluma; Reneé Rapp	GloRilla; Kaliii; PinkPantheress	—N/a	
2024	Chappell Roan†	Gracie Abrams*; Tyla	Benson Boone*; Shaboozey*; Teddy Swims*	—N/a	
2025	Alex Warren*	Sombr*; The Marías*	Ella Langley*; Gigi Perez; Lola Young*	—N/a	
2026	Sienna Spiro*	Bella Kay; Cortis	Magnus Ferrell; Malcolm Todd; Myles Smith; Stella Lefty	—N/a	

== See also ==
- Grammy Award for Best New Artist
- MTV Europe Music Award for Best New Act
- MTV Europe Music Award for Best Push Act
