= Free-for-All (Michael Penn album) =

Studio album by Michael Penn
- Released: 15 September 1992
- Recorded: 1991–1992
- Studio: Zeitgeist (Los Angeles, California); A&M (Hollywood, California); Groove Masters (Santa Monica, California)
- Genre: Rock, alternative rock, folk rock
- Length: 38:35
- Label: RCA
- Producer: Tony Berg, Michael Penn

Michael Penn chronology
March (1989)	Free-for-All (1992)	Resigned (1997)

Singles from Free-for-All
- 1. "Seen the Doctor" Released: 1992; 2. "Long Way Down (Look What the Cat Drug In)" Released: 1992

Free-for-All is the second album by the American singer-songwriter Michael Penn, released in 1992 on RCA Records. It contains two songs that reached the Top 20 on the Modern Rock charts: "Long Way Down (Look What the Cat Drug In)" peaked at number 14, while the second single, "Seen the Doctor", reached nine spots higher. The album led to a bitter battle between Penn and his record company, pushing a follow-up album to 1997.

== Critical reception ==
Professional ratings
Review scores
Source	Rating
AllMusic	4.5/5 stars
Chicago Tribune	3.5/4 stars

The Chicago Tribune stated: "Penn is again working with producer Tony Berg, but this time they provide a rich, subtle blending of instruments, harmonies and textures to create an album that doesn't so much pop out as seep in."

In his review for AllMusic, Stewart Mason wrote that it was the record which proved to critics that Penn was no one-hit wonder, calling "Long Way Down" a "dark and pained opening to an album that was hardly pop-star material."

== Track listing ==
All tracks composed by Michael Penn.

1. "Long Way Down (Look What the Cat Drug In)" – 3:52
2. "Free Time" – 4:12
3. "Coal" – 3:33
4. "Seen the Doctor" – 3:12
5. "By the Book" – 3:46
6. "Drained" – 3:59
7. "Slipping My Mind" – 2:36
8. "Strange Season" – 3:51
9. "Bunker Hill" – 4:39
10. "Now We're Even" – 4:55

== Personnel ==
=== Musicians ===
- Michael Penn – vocals, guitars
- Chris Hickey, Steven Soles, Glenn Tilbrook, Keith Wilkinson – backing vocals
- Bennett Chesne – guitars, backing vocals
- Gurf Morlix – pedal steel, steel guitar, backing vocals
- Tony Berg – harmonica, percussion
- Patrick Warren – keyboards
- Joel Hirsch – djembe, udu
- Wendy Melvoin – trombone
- Ron Leonard – cello
- John Pierce – bass
- Kenny Aronoff, D.J. Bonebrake, Jim Keltner, Ian McHandel Lepine, Pat Mastelotto – drums, percussion

=== Production ===
- Arranged by Michael Penn
- Produced by Michael Penn and Tony Berg
- Engineered by Greg Goldman (also assistant engineer), Chris Lord-Alge & Susan Rogers, with assistance by Paul Dieter & Ken Jordan
- Mixed by Bob Clearmountain
- Mastered by Bob Ludwig

== Charts ==
Chart performance for Free-for-All
Chart (1992)	Peak position
US Billboard 200	160
