= Trish Murphy =

American singer-songwriter

Background information
- Origin: Houston, Texas, U.S.
- Genres: Rock
- Occupations: Musician, songwriter
- Instruments: Vocals, guitar
- Years active: 1990s–present
- Labels: Raven, Mercury, Valley Entertainment, Rhythmic Records
- Website: www.trishmurphy.com

Trish Murphy is an American singer-songwriter, based in Austin, Texas, United States. She appeared in the Austin City Limits Music Festival twice and has released four records.

== Music career ==
Trish Murphy grew up in Houston, Texas, the daughter of a struggling musician and songwriter. After earning a Bachelor's Degree in Philosophy from the University of Dallas, she formed an eponymous duo with her brother, Darin Murphy, called Trish & Darin. They performed in Houston for several years in the early 1990s. In 1996, Murphy relocated to Austin, and the following year, released her independent album, Crooked Mile. In 1998 and 1999, Murphy performed live as part of the Lilith Fair tour. In 1999, Murphy released her album, Rubies on the Lawn, on Doolittle/Mercury Records. In 2001, she released the independent live acoustic album, Captured.

Following a several year sabbatical from performing, Murphy released her 2005 album, Girls Get In Free. This record's CD release party benefitted GENAustin, a non-profit outreach program that helps middle-school-aged girls develop strong self-esteem. Murphy is also a member of GENAustin's Board of Directors.

Murphy has performed twice at the Austin City Limits Music Festival.

Murphy is also a member of the Austin-based band, SKYROCKET!, a predominantly 1970-80s cover band that performs throughout Texas.

Murphy teaches Italian cooking at Austin's Central Market.

== Discography ==
- Yes, We're Open (with Darin Murphy), Rehab Records, 1991
- Tongue & Groove (with Darin Murphy), Rehab Records, 1993
- Crooked Mile, Rhythmic Records, 1998
- Rubies on the Lawn, Doolittle/Mercury Records, 1999
- Captured, Raven, 2001
- Girls Get In Free, Valley Entertainment, 2005

== See also ==
- Music of Austin
