= Mr. Hollywood Jr., 1947 =

Studio album by Michael Penn
- Released: August 2, 2005
- Recorded: At home, no dates given
- Genre: Rock
- Length: 38:24
- Label: Mimeograph Records
- Producer: Michael Penn

Michael Penn chronology
MP4: Days Since a Lost Time Accident (2000)	Mr. Hollywood Jr., 1947 (2005)	Cinemascope (2005)

Professional ratings
Review scores
Source	Rating
Allmusic	3.5/5 stars
Rolling Stone	3/5 stars
Metacritic	(7.4/10)

Mr. Hollywood Jr., 1947 is the fifth album by Michael Penn, originally released independently in 2005 on Mimeograph Records (Penn's United Musicians label) and distributed through SpinART Records. Legacy Recordings licensed the album for a 2007 reissue that included bonus tracks and a video.

The album's themes are framed by Penn's fascination with events taking place in 1947, which he describes as "the year everything changed." It is named for a Raymond Lark painting Penn had initially intended to use as the album's cover.

== Track listing ==
All songs by Michael Penn

1. "Walter Reed"
2. "Denton Road"
3. "Room 712, The Apache"
4. "Pretending"
5. "The Transistor"
6. "Mary Lynn"
7. "18 September"
8. "The Television Set Waltz"
9. "You Know How"
10. "A Bad Sign"
11. "O.K."
12. "On Automatic"
13. "(P.S.) Millionaire" (not listed in liner notes)

=== Legacy reissue bonus disc ===
Tracks 1–6 are live performances from a KCRW appearance

1. "Walter Reed"
2. "Bad Sign"
3. "Denton Road"
4. "I Can Tell"
5. "Me Around"
6. "O.K."
7. Video for "Walter Reed"
8. "Down by the Riverside" (hidden track)

== Personnel ==
- Michael Penn – dulcimer, bass, guitar, percussion, piano, Hammond organ, vocals
- Aimee Mann – bass, vocals
- Michael Bland – drums
- Julian Coryell – slide guitar
- Danny Frankel – drums
- Buddy Judge – harmony vocals
- Gary Louris – harmony vocals
- Patrick Warren – piano, Fender Rhodes, pianette
- Jebin Bruni – piano, pianette
- Dave Palmer – piano
- Sheldon Gomberg – upright bass
- Justin Rocherolle – drums
