= Resigned (album) =

Studio album by Michael Penn
- Released: 3 June 1997
- Studios: Southern Tracks, Atlanta, GA; Audities, North Hollywood, CA; Sony Music Studios, New York City; The Money Pit, Nashville, TN
- Genres: Pop rock, Alternative rock, Folk rock
- Length: 39:18
- Label: 57 Records/Epic
- Producer: Brendan O'Brien

Michael Penn chronology
Free-for-All (1992)	Resigned (1997)	MP4: Days Since a Lost Time Accident (2000)

Resigned is a 1997 album by singer-songwriter Michael Penn.

== "Try" music video ==
A music video for "Try", the opening song from the album, was directed by Paul Thomas Anderson. Penn had written the score for Anderson's film Boogie Nights, and the music video was shot with the crew, and certain members of the cast, of the film while it was in post-production. The entire music video is filmed in an over three minute long take (a technique Anderson frequently uses in his films) in downtown Los Angeles in the longest hallway in North America, which is over a quarter of a mile long.

The video features Penn walking briskly down the narrow hallway through various vignettes which allude to Boogie Nights and 70s pop culture, such as a dance marathon referencing the film They Shoot Horses, Don't They?.

Philip Seymour Hoffman makes two appearances in the video, the first time handing Penn a microphone and a guitar, the second time holding a boom mic in front of him. Hoffman is wearing a Planet of the Apes T-shirt and a jacket with the words "Angels Live in My Town" printed on it (a reference to Boogie Nights). Thomas Jane and Melora Walters are also among the cast members from Boogie Nights who make small appearances in the video.

The music video was included on the New Line Platinum DVD edition of Boogie Nights.

== Track listing ==
All tracks are written by Michael Penn.

No.	Title	Length
1.	"Try"	3:18
2.	"Me Around"	2:30
3.	"Like Egypt Was"	3:50
4.	"Out of My Hands"	3:37
5.	"All That That Implies"	4:14
6.	"Selfish"	2:53
7.	"Cover Up"	2:52
8.	"Figment"	5:32
9.	"Small Black Box"	2:27
10.	"Comfort"	3:03
11.	"I Can Tell"	5:02

== Personnel ==
- Michael Penn - guitar, vocals
- Brendan O'Brien - bass
- Patrick Warren - keyboards
- Dan McCarroll - drums
- Tommy Cooper - string arrangement on "Small Black Box" and "I Can Tell"
- Mike Clark - narrator on "I Can Tell"

== See also ==
- List of one-shot music videos
