= March (Michael Penn album) =

Studio album by Michael Penn
- Released: September 12, 1989
- Recorded: 1989
- Studios: Zeitgeist, Los Angeles, California
- Genre: Pop
- Length: 42:29
- Label: RCA
- Producer: Tony Berg

Michael Penn chronology
March (1989)	Free-for-All (1992)

Singles from March
- 1. "No Myth" Released: 1989; 2. "This & That" Released: 1990; 3. "Brave New World" Released: 1990

March is the debut album by the American musician Michael Penn, released in 1989.

It featured the singles "No Myth", "This and That", and "Brave New World". In 1990, "No Myth" peaked at No. 22 on the Billboard Hot Adult Contemporary Tracks chart, number five on the Mainstream Rock Tracks chart, number four on the Modern Rock Tracks chart, and No. 13 on the Billboard Hot 100. "This and That" reached No. 10 on the Modern Rock Tracks chart. "Brave New World" reached No. 20 on the Modern Rock Tracks chart and No. 26 on the Mainstream Rock Tracks chart.

== Critical reception ==
Professional ratings
Review scores
Source	Rating
AllMusic	4.5/5 stars
Rolling Stone	3.5/5 stars

The New York Times concluded that "the luscious textures, mystical atmosphere and cryptic lyrics ... recall the Beatles' psychedelic period as strongly as any pop music recorded in this decade."

== Track listing ==
All tracks written by Michael Penn, except where noted.

1. "No Myth" (4:10)
2. "Half Harvest" (4:05)
3. "This & That" (3:31)
4. "Brave New World" (4:32)
5. "Innocent One" (3:16)
6. "Disney's a Snow Cone/Bedlam Boys" (5:11) (Penn, Patrick Warren)
7. "Invisible" (3:45)
8. "Cupid's Got a Brand New Gun" (3:27)
9. "Big House" (2:56)
10. "Battle Room" (3:37)
11. "Evenfall" (3:54)

== Personnel ==
- Michael Penn – vocals, bass, guitar, drum programming
- Peter Blegvad – background vocals
- Jim Keltner – drums
- Jimmy Haslip – bass
- Kenny Aronoff – drums
- Tony Berg – guitar, keyboards
- Boni Boyer – background vocals
- David Coleman – cello, oud, daff
- Lisa Coleman – keyboards
- Larry Klein – bass
- Wendy Melvoin – bass, guitar, drum programming
- John Pierce – bass
- Patrick Warren – percussion, keyboards, drum programming
- Art Wood – percussion
- Diane Charlemagne – background vocals
- Charlie Sexton – guitar
- Gary Ferguson – drums, percussion

== Charts ==
Chart performance for March
Chart (1990)	Peak position
Australian Albums (ARIA)	50
Canada Top Albums/CDs (RPM)	28
Swedish Albums (Sverigetopplistan)	27
US Billboard 200	31
