= Michael Penn =

American musician (born 1958)

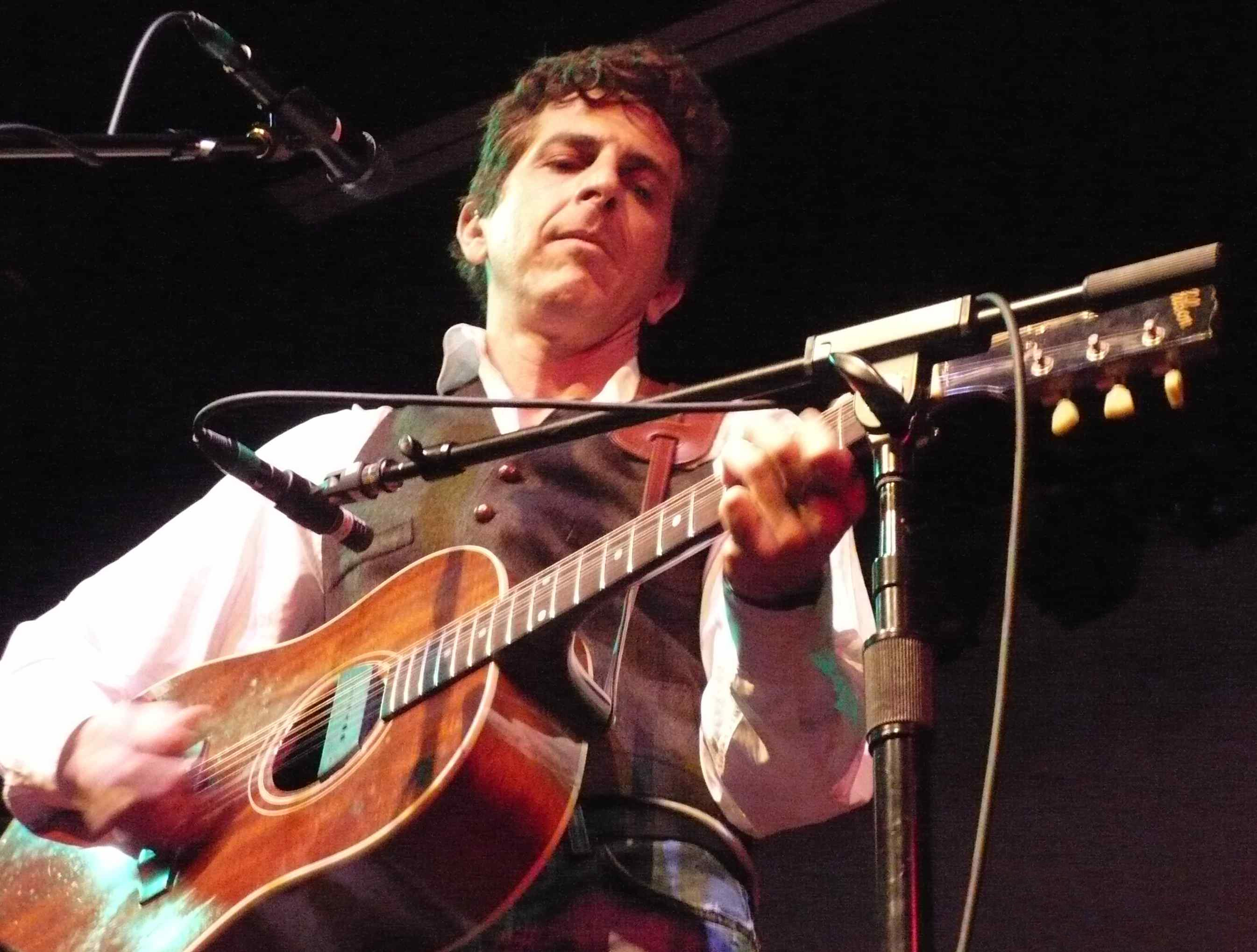
- Penn in 2007
- Born: Michael Daniel Penn; August 1, 1958 (age 68); Greenwich Village, New York City, New York, U.S.
- Occupations: Musician; singer; composer
- Parents: Leo Penn (father); Eileen Ryan (mother)
- Relatives: Sean Penn (brother); Chris Penn (brother); Dylan Penn (niece); Hopper Penn (nephew)
- Musical career
- Genres: Alternative rock; pop
- Instruments: Guitar; piano; bass; vocals
- Years active: 1989–present
- Labels: RCA; Sony; Mimeograph
- Formerly of: Doll Congress
- Spouse: Aimee Mann (m. 1997)
- Website: michaelpenn.com

Michael Daniel Penn (born August 1, 1958) is an American musician, singer, and composer. His 1989 single "No Myth" was a top 20 hit in the U.S. and successful in several other countries.

== Early life ==
Penn was born Michael Daniel Penn on August 1, 1958 in the Greenwich Village neighborhood of Manhattan. He is the first son of actor and director Leo Penn and actress Eileen Ryan, and the brother of actors Sean Penn and Chris Penn. He is of Lithuanian-Jewish (paternal) and Irish–Italian (maternal) descent. Penn began playing music in junior high school and attended Santa Monica High School.

== Career ==
Prior to the release of his 1989 debut album March, Penn was a member of the Los Angeles band Doll Congress. Penn was one of two musical guests as a solo artist on Saturday Night Live on the October 24, 1987 episode, with his brother Sean hosting. Penn had also appeared as an extra on a few television series, including St. Elsewhere.

March, particularly the first single, "No Myth", brought Penn attention, as well as the 1990 MTV Video Music Award for Best New Artist. Penn's follow-up albums Free-for-All (1992), Resigned (1997), MP4: Days Since a Lost Time Accident (2000), Mr. Hollywood Jr., 1947 (2005) and Palms and Runes, Tarot and Tea (2007) were not able to match the commercial success of March, although critics continued to praise his songcraft.

Penn's second album, Free-for-All, was praised by critics but was not as commercially successful as his debut. Rolling Stone called it "stunning" and CMJ wrote that the album "exhausts any doubts" about whether March was a fluke.

Penn collaborated with surrealist animators the Brothers Quay on "Long Way Down (Look What the Cat Drug In)", which was shown on MTV as well as in film festivals around the country.

He has worked extensively creating original music for film. He scored Paul Thomas Anderson's films Hard Eight (1996) and Boogie Nights (1997); he also appears in the latter in a cameo role as a recording engineer. During the editing of the film, Anderson directed a music video with Penn for "Try" from Resigned, which was filmed in one long shot (the video can be found on the Boogie Nights DVD). Other films scored by Penn include Alan Cumming's first two directorial efforts, The Anniversary Party and Suffering Man's Charity; American Teen, Sunshine Cleaning; the documentary The Comedians of Comedy; and The Last Kiss. In 2003, he was nominated for a DVDX Award for Best Original Score in a DVD Premiere Movie for Melvin Goes to Dinner. He co-produced Liz Phair (2003) by Liz Phair.

In August 2005, Penn released Mr. Hollywood Jr., 1947 on his own Mimeograph Records label. Its songs are set against the background of post-World War II Los Angeles; Penn said he chose the year because of several notable events that took place then, including the passage of the National Security Act and the invention of the transistor. The album was reissued by Legacy Recordings in April 2007 with bonus tracks from a KCRW session.

The reissue came in conjunction with Legacy's release of Palms and Runes, Tarot and Tea: A Michael Penn Collection, a compilation that includes several alternate versions and previously unreleased songs. Penn said his goal in compiling, ordering tracks for and producing Palms and Runes was to "make it feel like an album" in its own right.

In late 2009, Penn composed the music for the film That Evening Sun. In 2012, Penn began work as the composer for the HBO TV show Girls. In January 2013, the Girls Vol. 1 soundtrack was released on iTunes. The album contained a new song by Michael Penn titled "On Your Way", which was featured in the finale of Season 1.

He also joined the crew of Showtime's Masters of Sex in 2013 as series composer. The show's pilot episode was initially set to be scored by Thomas Newman, but this did not come to fruition and Penn scored both the pilot and the rest of the series.

In 2018, he joined Good Girls on NBC and Here and Now on HBO as a composer. In 2020, Penn released a new single, "A Revival". It was his first non-soundtrack work in 15 years.

== Personal life ==
Penn met fellow singer-songwriter Aimee Mann, and during the recording of her album I'm with Stupid (to which Penn contributed), the two struck up a friendship, which blossomed into romance and their subsequent marriage on December 29, 1997. Together with manager Michael Hausman they formed United Musicians, an independent music collective founded on "the principle that every artist should be able to retain copyright ownership of the work he or she has created and that this ownership is the basis for artistic strength and true independence." Penn and Mann live in Los Angeles.

His niece and nephew are actors Dylan Penn and Hopper Penn.

== Discography ==
=== Studio albums ===
List of studio albums, with selected chart positions
Title	Year	Peak chart positions		
Title	Year	US	AUS	SWE
March	1989	31	50	27
Free-for-All	1992	160	—	—
Resigned	1997	—	—	—
MP4: Days Since a Lost Time Accident	2000	—	—	—
Mr. Hollywood Jr., 1947	2005	—	—	—

=== Compilation albums ===
- Cinemascope (collection of film score tracks) (2005)
- Palms and Runes, Tarot and Tea: A Michael Penn Collection (2007)

=== Singles ===
Year	Title	Chart positions					Album
Year	Title	US	US Mod. Rock	AUS	BEL (FL)	NLD	Album
1989	"No Myth"	13	4	24	46	48	March
1990	"This & That"	53	10	86	—	74	March
1990	"Brave New World"	—	20	—	—	—	March
1992	"Seen the Doctor"	—	5	—	—	—	Free-for-All
1992	"Long Way Down (Look What the Cat Drug In)"	—	14	—	—	—	Free-for-All
1997	"Try"	—	—	—	—	—	Resigned
1997	"Me Around"	—	—	—	—	—	Resigned
1997	"Out of My Hands"	—	—	—	—	—	Resigned
2000	"Lucky One"	—	—	—	—	—	MP4
2020	"A Revival"	—	—	—	—	—	

=== With Gabriele Morgan and Doll Congress/Doll Congress ===
- Buried Treasure (5-song EP) (1981)
- Doll Congress 12" (1983)
- "Give Up Your Ghost" (sung by Morgan) and "I Will Be Around" (sung by Penn) appear on the soundtrack to Welcome to 18 (1986)

=== Appearances ===
- "Retribution" (guitar solo) on Randell Kirsch, LuAnn Olson and Chris Hickey's Show of Hands (1989)
- "Body and Soul?" (backing vocals) on Thelonious Monster's Beautiful Mess (1992)
- "Weeds" on the tribute album Sweet Relief: A Benefit for Victoria Williams (1993)
- "It's Not Safe" (guitar, solo guitar) on Aimee Mann's I'm With Stupid (1995)
- "Christmastime" with Aimee Mann on Just Say Noël (1996)
- "Wise Up" (produced) on Aimee Mann's contribution to Jerry Maguire (1996)
- "Ain't Talkin' 'Bout Love" with Mark Mothersbaugh on The Moog Cookbook's Ye Olde Space Bande (1997)
- "Macy Day Parade" on Godzilla: The Album (1998)
- "Reason to Believe" with Aimee Mann on Badlands: A Tribute to Bruce Springsteen's Nebraska (2000)
- "How Am I Different", "Susan" (backing vocals) on Aimee Mann's Bachelor No. 2 (2000)
- "Red Vines" (slide guitar) on Aimee Mann's Bachelor No. 2 (2000)
- "Satellite" (guitar feedback, backing vocals) on Aimee Mann's Bachelor No. 2 (2000)
- "Driving Sideways" (electric guitar, backing vocals) on Aimee Mann's Bachelor No. 2 (2000)
- "Susan" (guitar) on Aimee Mann's Bachelor No. 2 (2000)
- Co-produced The Wallflowers' (Breach) (2000)
- "Two of Us" with Aimee Mann on I Am Sam (2001)
- "It's Sweet", "Little Digger" (produced, recorded by, guitar, bass) on Liz Phair's self-titled fourth album (2003)
- "Red Light Fever", "Take A Look", "Friend of Mine" (produced, recorded by, guitar) on Liz Phair (2003)

=== Film scores ===
- Tales From The Vienna Woods (1993)
- Hard Eight (originally titled Sydney), with Jon Brion (1996)
- Boogie Nights (1997)
- The Anniversary Party (2001)
- Melvin Goes to Dinner (2003)
- The Comedians of Comedy (2005)
- The Last Kiss (2006)
- Suffering Man's Charity (2007)
- American Teen (2008)
- Sunshine Cleaning (2008)
- That Evening Sun (2009)
- Bollywood Hero (2009)
- Solitary Man (2010)
- Carrie Pilby (2016)
- Boundaries (2017)
- Hollywood Stargirl (2022)
- Fairyland (2023)
- I Love You Forever (2024)

== Filmography ==
- St. Elsewhere (Lab technician, as an extra) (1985)
- Boogie Nights (Nick, an engineer) (1997)
