= Trevor Steel =

- Born: Trevor David Steel; January 5, 1958 (age 68); Hampstead, London, England
- Genres: Alternative rock, pop rock
- Occupations: Musician, record producer, record label owner
- Instruments: Vocals, guitar
- Years active: 1980–present
- Labels: EMI, Atlantic, Sunday Morning, Whipped Cream
- Spouse: Tracey Steel (m. 2012)

Trevor David Steel (born January 5, 1958) is an English singer-songwriter and guitarist. He is a mainstay member of alternative rock band the Escape Club, which formed in 1983, disbanded in 1992 and reformed in 2009. In 1988, with other members of the Escape Club, he co-wrote their number-one Billboard Hot 100 hit "Wild, Wild West". Steel has also worked as a record producer and owns a record label. In 2004, he relocated to Australia and appeared as a judge on TV talent search series, Popstars Live. In 2006, Steel founded the record label Sunday Morning Records, with Chris Johns in Sydney; they co-managed then pop punk group Short Stack from 2007 to 2011. Steel co-produced Short Stack's first two albums with their singer-songwriter, Shaun Diviney.

== Career ==
Trevor David Steel was born in 1958 in Hampstead, London. In the early 1980s, Steel was a part of the dance-rock group, Mad Shadows, and by 1982, the band consisted of Steel on lead vocals, John Holliday on lead guitar, Hermann Profile, and Milan Zekavica (ex-The Expressos) on drums. They backed electronic rock musician Stephen Milford on his Planning by Numbers release 1: Catch the Beat (1982), where Steel played lead and rhythm guitars and Holliday played bass. In 1983, Steel, Holliday and Zekavica formed an alternative pop rock group the Escape Club, with Zekavica's former Expressos bandmate Johnny Christo (aka John Christoforou) on bass guitar. In 1983, their debut single, "Breathing", was issued on Bright Records. It was co-written by Steel with fellow Escape Club band members. In 1985 they signed with EMI which released their first album, White Fields. In 1988 their second album, Wild Wild West, was released on Atlantic Records. The title track and lead single went to No. 1 on the Billboard Hot 100. The track was co-written by Steel with Christoforou, Holliday, Zekavica and UK pop singer-songwriter Amos Pizzey. The Escape Club released two more singles from Wild, Wild West, "Shake for the Sheik" which reached No. 28 and "Walking Through Walls" which peaked at No. 81. They released their third album, Dollars & Sex, in March 1991 which included the No. 8 single, "I’ll Be There".

In 1992, the Escape Club disbanded and Steel, with Holliday, started a career as a songwriter and record producer. Based out of Air Studios in London, first under the production name, Bump and Grind, and later as themselves, they wrote and produced UK pop hits. The pair worked on Louise Nurding's hit singles "Naked" (1995) and "Arms Around the World" (1997); and the album track, "The Woman in Me". Other artists Steel and Holliday have worked for include Andrew Dorff, Aswad, Atomic Kitten, Candice Alley, Baha Men, Boyzone, Eternal, Honeyz, Nightcrawlers, Stella Soleil, Sting, Shaggy, Thunderbugs, and Westlife.

In 2004, Steel emigrated to Australia where Universal Records hired him to A&R for the ill-fated Channel Seven talent search series, Popstars Live. After two previous judges were sacked, Steel appeared on the judging panel alongside Molly Meldrum and Shauna Jensen. In 2006 after discovering the band, Short Stack, Steel signed them to his record Label, Sunday Morning Records, founded with Chris Johns in Sydney. Short Stack's first album, Stack Is the New Black (2009) peaked at No, 1 on the ARIA Albums Chart. It was co-produced by Steel and Short Stack's Shaun Diviney. Their second album, This Is Bat Country charted at No, 6. Both albums received gold certification from ARIA for shipment of 35,000 units each. Steel co-wrote some tracks on This is Bat Country with Diviney, including the platinum selling single, "Planets", which debuted at No. 4. Steel also co-produced their second album.

In 2010, Steel and Holliday re-formed the Escape Club to perform and record a new album, Celebrity, which was released in February 2012 on their own label Whipped Cream Records. In April 2012, the band toured the US East Coast in support of the album and its lead single, "God's Own Radio".
