= Dance with Me (EP) =

EP by Short Stack
- Released: 27 March 2015
- Length: 24:47
- Label: Short Stack
- Producer: Short Stack

Short Stack chronology
Art Vandelay (2013)	Dance with Me (2015)	Homecoming (2015)

Singles from Dance with Me
- 1. "Dance with Me" Released: 6 March 2015

Dance with Me is the debut extended play by Australian pop punk band Short Stack. The EP was released on 27 March 2015 and peaked at number 12 on the ARIA charts.

== Reception ==
Professional ratings
Review scores
Source	Rating
The Music AU	2.5/5 stars

Cameron Cooper from The Music AU said "Propped up by some stellar live cuts, the latest release from Short Stack may fall short when held up against the rest of their discography... The EP is likely to satisfy fans while they await the new record, but won't ignite the masses the way This Is Bat Country did."

== Track listing ==
All tracks are written by Short Stack

No.	Title	Length
1.	"Dance With Me"	3:22
2.	"I Don't Wanna Get Better"	3:29
3.	"Hearts On Fire"	3:24
4.	"See You, Space Cowboy..."	2:32
5.	"Television" (live)	3:24
6.	"Shimmy a Go Go" (live)	4:04
7.	"Planets" (live)	4:29

== Charts ==
Chart (2015)	Peak position
Australian Albums (ARIA)	12
