= Sweet December =

Single by Short Stack

from the album This Is Bat Country
- Released: 11 December 2009
- Length: 3:38
- Label: Sunday Morning Records
- Songwriter(s): Short Stack
- Producer(s): Shaun Diviney; Bradie Webb; Lee Groves

Short Stack singles chronology
"Ladies & Gentlemen" (2009)	"Sweet December" (2009)	"Planets" (2010)

Sweet December is a song by Australian pop punk band, Short Stack. It was released on 11 December 2009 as the lead single from the band's second studio album, This Is Bat Country.

== Track listing ==
All tracks are written by Shaun Diviney and Bradie Webb

CD single (SMR0017)
No.	Title	Length
1.	"Sweet December"	3:38
2.	"Ladies & Gentlemen" (Lee Groves Mix – Radio Edit)	3:07
3.	"Its4UBradie Mix"	4:48
4.	"Shimmy a Go Go" (Bradie Mix)	4:10
5.	"Back of My Head" (Bradie Mix; digital copy exclusive)	4:24
6.	"Ladies and Gentlemen" (music video; physical copy exclusive)	3:34

== Personnel ==
Short Stack

- Shaun Diviney – guitar, vocals
- Andy Clemmensen – bass guitar, vocals
- Bradie Webb – drums, keyboard

== Charts ==
=== Weekly charts ===
Chart (2009–10)	Peak position
Australia (ARIA)	8

=== Year-end charts ===
Chart (2009)	Position
Australian Artists (ARIA)	45
