= 1989 MTV Video Music Awards =

Award ceremony

- Date: Wednesday, September 6, 1989
- Location: Universal Amphitheatre, Los Angeles
- Country: United States
- Hosted by: Arsenio Hall
- Most awards: Paula Abdul and Madonna (4 each)
- Most nominations: Michael Jackson (9)
- Website: www.mtv.com/vma/1989/

Television/radio coverage
- Network: MTV
- Produced by: Dick Clark; Doug Herzog
- Directed by: Bruce Gowers

The 1989 MTV Video Music Awards aired live on September 6, 1989, honoring the best music videos from April 2, 1988, to June 1, 1989. The show was hosted by Arsenio Hall at the Universal Amphitheatre in Los Angeles.

This year four new "genre" categories (Best Heavy Metal Video, Best Rap Video, Best Dance Video, and Best Post-Modern Video) were added, alongside the International Viewer's Choice awards. Also, the award for Best Concept Video was retired this year, and the eligibility cutoff date was moved two months down from April to June, making this a 14-month eligibility year.

In terms of the awards, Madonna and Paula Abdul were the night's biggest winners with four awards each, while rock group Living Colour was the second biggest winner, taking home three moonmen that night. On the other hand, Michael Jackson was the most nominated artist of 1989, receiving nine nominations for two of his videos: six for "Leave Me Alone" and three for "Smooth Criminal", but only took home one award for Best Special Effects.

The award for Video of the Year, went to Neil Young's controversial video for "This Note's for You", making this the first time since The Cars' win in 1984 that an act takes home the main award without winning any other one. Unlike The Cars, though, Young's video did not have any other nominations that night except for Viewer's Choice, which until 1994 had exactly the same nominees as Video of the Year. The Viewer's Choice award, however, went to another video that also stirred up controversy: Madonna's "Like a Prayer."

The ceremony is notable for comedian Andrew Dice Clay's stand-up routine that included adult versions of Mother Goose nursery rhymes, leading MTV executives to ban him from ever appearing on the network again, and Def Leppard's performance of "Tear It Down" would be the last live appearance of guitarist Steve Clark before his death on Tuesday January 8, 1991.

== Background ==
MTV announced in mid-June that Arsenio Hall would host the 1989 Video Music Awards, which would be held on September 6 at the Universal Amphitheatre. Nominees were announced at a press conference held at the Saxon-Lee Gallery in Los Angeles on July 11. The addition of four "genre" categories was meant to reflect MTV's new programming strategy, which shifted away from freeform video rotation to specific shows dedicated to certain genres. Thus, Best Dance Video reflected the videos on Club MTV, Best Heavy Metal Video reflected Headbangers Ball, Best Rap Video reflected Yo! MTV Raps, and Best Post-Modern Video reflected Post-Modern MTV. For the first time, the ceremony was broadcast via satellite on MTV's international affiliates, leading to the introduction of the International Viewer's Choice awards. The ceremony broadcast was preceded by Ken & Kevin on the Road to the 1989 MTV Video Music Awards, hosted by Ken Ober and Kevin Seal.

== Performances ==
List of musical performances
Artist(s)	Song(s)	Ref.
Madonna	"Express Yourself"	
Bobby Brown	"On Our Own"	
Def Leppard	"Tear It Down"	
Tone-Loc	"Wild Thing"	
The Cult	"Fire Woman"	
Paula Abdul	Medley "Straight Up" "Cold Hearted" "Forever Your Girl"	
Jon Bon Jovi; Richie Sambora	"Livin' on a Prayer" (intro) "Wanted Dead or Alive"	
The Cure	"Just Like Heaven"	
Cher	"If I Could Turn Back Time"	
The Rolling Stones	"Mixed Emotions"	
Axl Rose; Tom Petty and the Heartbreakers	"Free Fallin'" "Heartbreak Hotel"	

While MTV Unplugged was already in development by the time of this event, its showrunners have credited the acoustic performances of Jon Bon Jovi and Richie Sambora with influencing the show to go from initially being meant only for "young, up-and-coming artists" into being a simplified showcase for the "big, stadium, electric-arena-type acts".

== Presenters ==
- Christina Applegate and Alice Cooper – presented Best Group Video
- Mick Jagger – presented the Best Group Video Moonman to Living Colour during their acceptance segment via satellite from Three Rivers Stadium
- Corbin Bernsen and Downtown Julie Brown – presented Best Dance Video
- Richard Lewis – introduced Def Leppard
- Jasmine Guy and "Weird" Al Yankovic – presented Best Video from a Film
- Mötley Crüe – presented Best Heavy Metal Video
- Jody Watley and Lou Diamond Phillips – presented Best Choreography in a Video and Best Stage Performance in a Video
- Robert Townsend – introduced the International Viewer's Choice Award winners
- VJs Daisy Fuentes (Internacional), Sayo Morita (Japan) and Maiken Wexø (Europe) – announced Viewer's Choice winners for their respective regions
- Ray Cokes – briefly introduced international winners Chayanne and Kome Kome Club before a commercial break and told viewers what was 'coming up' on the show
- James Woods – presented Best Direction in a Video
- Ione Skye and Christian Slater – presented Best New Artist in a Video
- Madonna – presented the Video Vanguard Award
- Neneh Cherry and Fab Five Freddy – presented Best Rap Video
- Arsenio Hall (host) – introduced the winners of the professional categories and announced the winners of Breakthrough Video and Best Post-Modern Video
- Andrew Dice Clay – introduced Cher
- Ken Ober and Colin Quinn – presented Viewer's Choice
- Julie Brown and Richard Marx – presented Best Male Video and Best Female Video
- Michael Hutchence – presented Video of the Year

== Winners and nominees ==
Winners are listed first and highlighted in bold.

Video of the Year	Best Male Video
**Neil Young – "This Note's for You"**; Fine Young Cannibals – "She Drives Me Crazy"; Michael Jackson – "Leave Me Alone"; Madonna – "Like a Prayer"; Steve Winwood – "Roll with It"	**Elvis Costello – "Veronica"**; Bobby Brown – "Every Little Step"; Lou Reed – "Dirty Blvd."; Steve Winwood – "Roll with It"
Best Female Video	Best Group Video
**Paula Abdul – "Straight Up"**; Tracy Chapman – "Fast Car"; Madonna – "Express Yourself"; Tanita Tikaram – "Twist in My Sobriety"; Jody Watley – "Real Love"	**Living Colour – "Cult of Personality"**; Fine Young Cannibals – "She Drives Me Crazy"; Guns N' Roses – "Sweet Child o' Mine"; Traveling Wilburys – "Handle with Care"
Best New Artist in a Video	Best Heavy Metal Video
**Living Colour – "Cult of Personality"**; Paula Abdul – "Straight Up"; Edie Brickell & New Bohemians – "What I Am"; Neneh Cherry – "Buffalo Stance"	**Guns N' Roses – "Sweet Child o' Mine"**; Aerosmith – "Rag Doll"; Def Leppard – "Pour Some Sugar on Me"; Metallica – "One"
Best Rap Video	Best Dance Video
**DJ Jazzy Jeff & The Fresh Prince – "Parents Just Don't Understand"**; Ice-T – "Colors"; Kool Moe Dee – "How Ya Like Me Now"; MC Hammer – "Turn This Mutha Out"; Tone Lōc – "Wild Thing"	**Paula Abdul – "Straight Up"**; Bobby Brown – "Every Little Step"; Michael Jackson – "Smooth Criminal"; Jody Watley – "Real Love"
Best Post-Modern Video	Best Video from a Film
**R.E.M. – "Orange Crush"**; The Cure – "Fascination Street"; The Escape Club – "Wild, Wild West"; Love and Rockets – "So Alive"; Siouxsie and the Banshees – "Peek-a-Boo"	**U2 with B.B. King – "When Love Comes to Town" (from Rattle and Hum)**; The Belle Stars – "Iko Iko" (from Rain Man); Ice-T – "Colors" (from Colors); Annie Lennox and Al Green – "Put a Little Love in Your Heart" (from Scrooged)
Breakthrough Video	Best Stage Performance in a Video
**Art of Noise** (featuring Tom Jones) – "Kiss"; Paula Abdul – "Straight Up"; Elvis Costello – "Veronica"; The Escape Club – "Wild, Wild West"; Fine Young Cannibals – "She Drives Me Crazy"; Michael Jackson – "Leave Me Alone"; Jody Watley – "Real Love"	**Living Colour – "Cult of Personality"**; Bobby Brown – "My Prerogative"; Def Leppard – "Pour Some Sugar on Me"; Guns N' Roses – "Paradise City"
Best Direction in a Video	Best Choreography in a Video
**Madonna – "Express Yourself" (Director: David Fincher)**; DJ Jazzy Jeff & The Fresh Prince – "Parents Just Don't Understand" (Director: Scott Kalvert); Van Halen – "Finish What Ya Started" (Director: Andy Morahan); Jody Watley – "Real Love" (Director: David Fincher); Steve Winwood – "Roll with It" (Director: David Fincher)	**Paula Abdul – "Straight Up" (Choreographer: Paula Abdul)**; Bobby Brown – "Every Little Step" (Choreographer: Bobby Brown); Michael Jackson – "Smooth Criminal" (Choreographers: Michael Jackson and Vincent Paterson); New Kids on the Block – "You Got It (The Right Stuff)" (Choreographer: Tyrone Procter)
Best Special Effects in a Video	Best Art Direction in a Video
**Michael Jackson – "Leave Me Alone" (Special Effects: Jim Blashfield)**; Adrian Belew – "Oh Daddy" (Special Effects: Joey Ahlbum); The Escape Club – "Wild, Wild West" (Special Effects: Nicholas Brandt and Bridget Blake-Wilson); Prince – "I Wish U Heaven" (Special Effects: Maury Rosenfeld and Fred Raimondi)	**Madonna – "Express Yourself" (Art Directors: Holgar Gross and Vance Lorenzini)**; DJ Jazzy Jeff & The Fresh Prince – "Parents Just Don't Understand" (Art Director: Greg Harrison); Debbie Gibson – "Electric Youth" (Art Director: Rhaz Zeizler); INXS – "New Sensation" (Art Director: Lynn-Maree Milburn); Michael Jackson – "Leave Me Alone" (Art Director: Jim Blashfield); Jody Watley – "Real Love" (Art Director: Piers Plowden)
Best Editing in a Video	Best Cinematography in a Video
**Paula Abdul – "Straight Up" (Editor: Jim Haygood)**; Michael Jackson – "Leave Me Alone" (Editor: Paul Diener); Madonna – "Express Yourself" (Editor: Scott Chestnut); Jody Watley – "Real Love" (Editor: Scott Chestnut); Steve Winwood – "Roll with It" (Editor: Scott Chestnut)	**Madonna – "Express Yourself" (Director of Photography: Mark Plummer)**; Michael Jackson – "Smooth Criminal" (Director of Photography: John Hora); Tanita Tikaram – "Twist in My Sobriety" (Director of Photography: Jeff Darling); Steve Winwood – "Roll with It" (Director of Photography: Mark Plummer)
Viewer's Choice	International Viewer's Choice: MTV Europe
**Madonna – "Like a Prayer"**; Fine Young Cannibals – "She Drives Me Crazy"; Michael Jackson – "Leave Me Alone"; Steve Winwood – "Roll with It"; Neil Young – "This Note's for You"	**Roxette – "The Look"**; Front 242 – "Headhunter"; The Jeremy Days – "Brand New Toy"; Niagara – "Soleil d'Hiver"; Rainbirds – "Sea of Time"; Vaya con Dios – "Don't Cry for Louie"
International Viewer's Choice: MTV Internacional	International Viewer's Choice: MTV Japan
**Chayanne – "Este Ritmo Se Baila Así"**; Emmanuel – "La Última Luna"; Gipsy Kings – "Djobi Djoba"; Miguel Mateos–ZAS – "Y, sin Pensar"; Fito Páez – "Sólo los Chicos"	**Kome Kome Club – "Kome Kome War"**; Kyosuke Himuro – "Angel"; Toshinobu Kubota – "Indigo Waltz"; Unicorn – "Daimeiwaku"
Video Vanguard Award
**George Michael**

== Artists with multiple wins and nominations ==
Artists who received multiple awards
Wins	Artist
4	Madonna
4	Paula Abdul
3	Living Colour

Artists who received multiple nominations
Nominations	Artist
9	Michael Jackson
7	Madonna
6	Jody Watley
6	Paula Abdul
6	Steve Winwood
4	Bobby Brown
4	Fine Young Cannibals
3	DJ Jazzy Jeff & The Fresh Prince
3	Guns N' Roses
3	Living Colour
3	The Escape Club
2	Def Leppard
2	Elvis Costello
2	Ice-T
2	Neil Young
2	Tanita Tikaram

== Music Videos with multiple wins and nominations ==
Music Videos that received multiple awards
Wins	Artist	Music Video
4	Paula Abdul	"Straight Up"
3	Living Colour	"Cult of Personality"
3	Madonna	"Express Yourself"

Music Videos that received multiple nominations
Nominations	Artist	Music Video
6	Jody Watley	"Real Love"
6	Michael Jackson	"Leave Me Alone"
6	Paula Abdul	"Straight Up"
6	Steve Winwood	"Roll with It"
5	Madonna	"Express Yourself"
4	Fine Young Cannibals	"She Drives Me Crazy"
3	Bobby Brown	"Every Little Step"
3	DJ Jazzy Jeff & The Fresh Prince	"Parents Just Don't Understand"
3	Living Colour	"Cult of Personality"
3	Michael Jackson	"Smooth Criminal"
3	The Escape Club	"Wild, Wild West"
2	Def Leppard	"Pour Some Sugar on Me"
2	Elvis Costello	"Veronica"
2	Guns N' Roses	"Sweet Child O'Mine"
2	Ice-T	"Colors"
2	Madonna	"Like a Prayer"
2	Neil Young	"This Note's for You"
2	Tanita Tikaram	"Twist in My Sobriety"

== Other appearances ==
- Kevin Seal – appeared in a couple of pre-commercial segments telling viewers what was 'coming up' on the show
- Richard Lewis – performed a brief stand-up routine
- Fab Five Freddy – appeared in a pre-commercial segment telling viewers what was 'coming up' on the show
- Julie Brown – appeared in a series of taped vignettes before some commercial breaks
- Adam Curry – appeared in a couple of pre-commercial segments telling viewers what was 'coming up' on the show
- Daisy Fuentes – appeared in a pre-commercial segment telling viewer's what was 'coming up' on the show
- Andrew Dice Clay – performed a brief stand-up routine
- Ken Ober and Colin Quinn – appeared in segments about Viewer's Choice voting procedures throughout the show
