= MTV Video Music Award for Best Post-Modern Video =

Annual music video award

The MTV Video Music Award for Best Post-Modern Video was first given out in 1989, and it was one of the four original genre categories added to the VMAs that year. The award was last presented in 1990, and the category was renamed Best Alternative Video the following year.

== Recipients ==
Year	Winner	Other nominees	Ref.
1989	R.E.M. — "Orange Crush"	The Cure — "Fascination Street"; The Escape Club — "Wild, Wild West"; Love and Rockets — "So Alive"; Siouxsie and the Banshees — "Peek-a-Boo"	
1990	Sinéad O'Connor — "Nothing Compares 2 U"	Depeche Mode — "Personal Jesus"; Red Hot Chili Peppers — "Higher Ground"; Tears for Fears — "Sowing the Seeds of Love"	
