= Bang Bang Sexy =

Single by Short Stack

from the album Art Vandelay
- Released: 19 September 2011
- Recorded: 2011
- Genre: Dance-punk
- Label: Sunday Morning Records
- Songwriter(s): Shaun Diviney, John Holliday, Trevor Steel

Short Stack singles chronology
"Heartbreak Made Me a Killer" (2011)	"Bang Bang Sexy" (2011)	"S.O.U.L." (2013)

"Bang Bang Sexy" is a song by an Australian pop punk band, Short Stack. This song was released in September 2011 as the lead single from their-then third studio album, Art Vandelay. The song has a slightly more electric feel than the other songs Short Stack have released. One review online also stated that it's "poppier with a definite dance funk edge."

== Music video ==
A video clip was also made for this song. It was directed by Dan Reisinger. It features two contestants from Australia's Next Top Model. As the two models wrestle male opponents (as well as each other), in a steel cage match, Short Stack play the song, on a stage above the ring. Shaun Diviney's guitar seems to appear and disappear during the song.

== Charts ==
Chart (2011)	Peak position
Australia (ARIA)	98
