= MTV Video Music Award for Best Art Direction =

Annual music video award

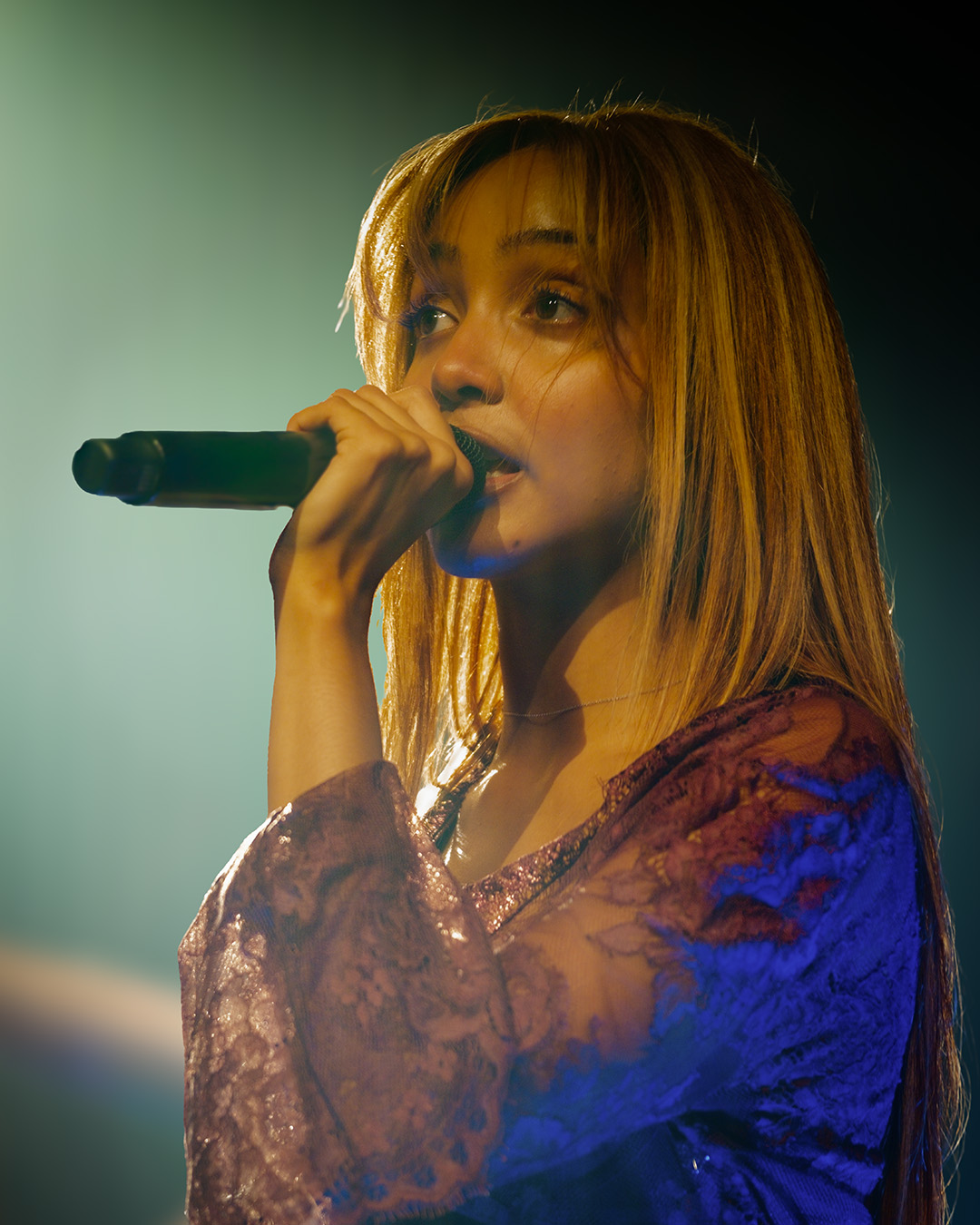
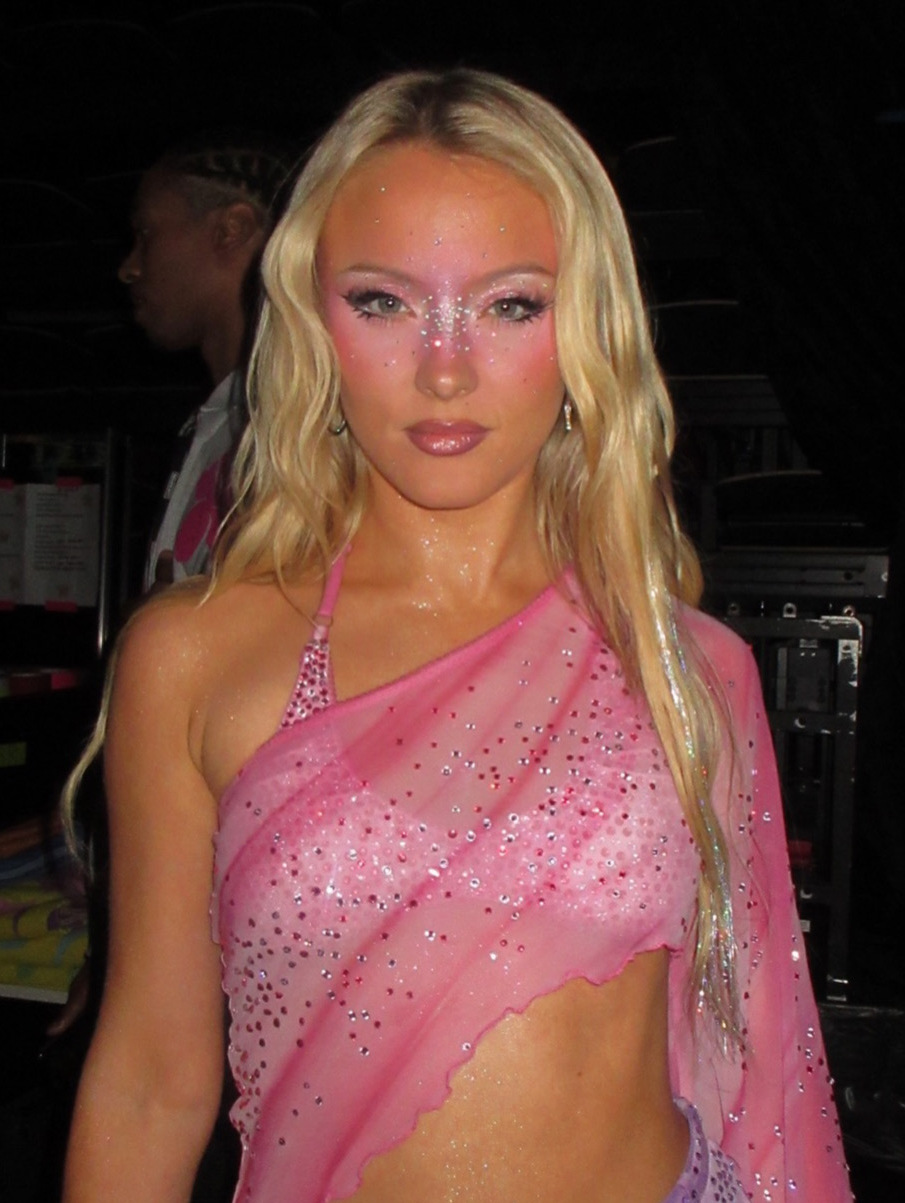
- "Stateside + Zara Larsson" by PinkPantheress and Zara Larsson is the most recent recipient.
- Awarded for: Art direction
- Country: United States
- Presented by: MTV
- First award: 1984
- Currently held by: Furmaan Ahmed – "Stateside + Zara Larsson" by PinkPantheress and Zara Larsson (2026)

Highlights
- Most wins: Red Hot Chili Peppers (3); Jan Houllevigue, K. K. Barrett & Spencer Graves (2)
- Most nominations: Lady Gaga, Madonna & Taylor Swift (7); Tom Foden (5)
- Website: VMA website

The MTV Video Music Award for Best Art Direction is a craft award given to both the artist as well as the art director of the music video. From 1984 to 2006, the award's full name was Best Art Direction in a Video, and after a brief removal in 2007, its name was shortened to its current form starting in 2008. The biggest winners are K. K. Barrett and Jan Houllevigue, both of whom won this award twice.

The most nominated art director is Tom Foden, who was nominated five times between 1993 and 2021. Closely following him are Charles Infante, Ethan Tobman, Laura Fox, and K. K. Barrett with four nominations each; and Bryan Jones and Nigel Phelps with three.

The performer whose videos have won the most awards is Red Hot Chili Peppers with three. Lady Gaga, Madonna and Taylor Swift tie as the performers with the most nominations, at four each.

No performer has won a Moonman in this category for their work as an art director. Jamie Hewlett, Jack White, SZA and A$AP Rocky are the only performers to have been nominated as their videos' art directors in this category.

== Recipients ==
=== 1980s ===
Year	Winner(s)	Work	Nominees	Ref.
1984	Jim Whiting and Godley & Creme	"Rockit" (performed by Herbie Hancock)	"Dancing with Myself" – Kim Colefax (performed by Billy Idol); "Every Breath You Take" – Kim Colefax and Godley & Creme (performed by The Police); "Radio Ga Ga" – Bryce Walmsley (performed by Queen); "You Might Think" – Bob Ryzner (performed by The Cars)	
1985	Bryan Jones	"The Boys of Summer" (performed by Don Henley)	"Don't You (Forget About Me)" – Mark Rimmell (performed by Simple Minds); "It's a Miracle" – Bruce Hill (performed by Culture Club); "Like a Virgin" – John Ebdon (performed by Madonna); "Run to You" – Steven Barron (performed by Bryan Adams); "Zie Zie Won't Dance" – John Jolly (performed by Peter Brown)	
1986	Ron Cobb	"Rough Boy" (performed by ZZ Top)	"Feel It Again" – David Brockhurst (performed by Honeymoon Suite); "Money for Nothing" – Steven Barron (performed by Dire Straits); "Sex as a Weapon" – Daniel Kleinman (performed by Pat Benatar); "The Sun Always Shines on T.V." – Stefan Roman (performed by a-ha)	
1987	Stephen Quay and Timothy Quay	"Sledgehammer" (performed by Peter Gabriel)	"The Boy in the Bubble" – Jim Blashfield (performed by Paul Simon); "Land of Confusion" – John Lloyd, Jim Yukich and Stephen Bendelack (performed by Genesis); "Open Your Heart" – Mike Hanan (performed by Madonna); "Right on Track" – Allie Willis and Bryan Jones (performed by Breakfast Club)	
1988	Clive Crotty and Mick Edwards	"Hourglass" (performed by Squeeze)	"Faith" – Bryan Jones (performed by George Michael); "Need You Tonight/Mediate" – Lynn-Maree Milburn (performed by INXS); "Tunnel of Love" – Howard Cummings and Beth Rubino (performed by Bruce Springsteen); "When We Was Fab" – Sid Bartholomew (performed by George Harrison)	
1989	Holgar Gross and Vance Lorenzini	"Express Yourself" (performed by Madonna)	"Electric Youth" – Rhaz Zeizler (performed by Debbie Gibson); "Leave Me Alone" – Jim Blashfield (performed by Michael Jackson); "New Sensation" – Lynn-Maree Milburn (performed by INXS); "Parents Just Don't Understand" – Greg Harrison (performed by DJ Jazzy Jeff & The Fresh Prince); "Real Love" – Piers Plowden (performed by Jody Watley)	

=== 1990s ===
Year	Winner(s)	Work	Nominees	Ref.
1990	Martin Lasowitz	"Love Shack" (performed by The B-52's)	"Janie's Got a Gun" – Alex McDowell (performed by Aerosmith); "Vogue" – Lauryn LeClere (performed by Madonna); "We Didn't Start the Fire" – Sterling Storm (performed by Billy Joel)	
1991	José Montaño	"Losing My Religion" (performed by R.E.M.)	"Falling to Pieces" – David Faithfull (performed by Faith No More); "Freedom! '90" – John Beard (performed by George Michael); "The King Is Half-Undressed" – Michael White (performed by Jellyfish); "Love Will Never Do (Without You)" – Pierluca De Carlo (performed by Janet Jackson); "Mama Help Me" – Leonardo (performed by Edie Brickell & New Bohemians); "Things That Make You Go Hmmm..." – Marcus Nispel (performed by C+C Music Factory)	
1992	Nick Goodman and Robertino Mazati	"Give It Away" (performed by Red Hot Chili Peppers)	"Baby Got Back" – Dan Hubp (performed by Sir Mix-a-Lot); "Broken Arrow" – José Montaño (performed by Rod Stewart); "November Rain" – Nigel Phelps (performed by Guns N' Roses)	
1993	Jan Peter Flack	"Rain" (performed by Madonna)	"Are You Gonna Go My Way" – Nigel Phelps (performed by Lenny Kravitz); "Constant Craving" – Tom Foden (performed by k.d. lang); "If I Ever Lose My Faith in You" – Mike Grant and Andrew Elias (performed by Sting); "Livin' on the Edge" – Vance Lorenzini (performed by Aerosmith); "Man on the Moon" – Jan Peter Flack (performed by R.E.M.); "A Small Victory" – Tyler Smith (performed by Faith No More)	
1994	Bernadette Disanto	"Heart-Shaped Box" (performed by Nirvana)	"Amazing" – Ted Baffalucus (performed by Aerosmith); "Closer" – Tom Foden (performed by Nine Inch Nails); "Human Behaviour" – Michel Gondry (performed by Björk)	
1995	Tom Foden	"Scream" (performed by Michael Jackson and Janet Jackson)	"I Kissed a Girl" – Kelly Van Patter (performed by Jill Sobule); "Take a Bow" – Happy Massee (performed by Madonna); "Waterfalls" – Keith Burns (performed by TLC)	
1996	K. K. Barrett and Wayne White	"Tonight, Tonight" (performed by The Smashing Pumpkins)	It's Oh So Quiet" – Teri Whittaker (performed by Björk); Salvation" – William Abelo (performed by The Cranberries); "Tongue" – Clam Lynch (performed by R.E.M.)	
1997	K. K. Barrett	"The New Pollution" (performed by Beck)	"The Beautiful People" – Ken Baird (performed by Marilyn Manson); "The Perfect Drug" – Tom Foden (performed by Nine Inch Nails); "Virtual Insanity" – John Bramble (performed by Jamiroquai)	
1998	Samantha Gore	"Bachelorette" (performed by Björk)	"Dirt" – Andrea Giacobbe (performed by Death in Vegas); "Everlong" – Bill Lakoss (performed by Foo Fighters); "Push It" – Virginia Lee (performed by Garbage)	
1999	Gideon Ponte	"Doo Wop (That Thing)" (performed by Lauryn Hill)	"Freak on a Leash" – K. K. Barrett, Todd McFarlane, Terry Fitzgerald and Graham Morris (performed by Korn); "No Scrubs" – Regan Jackson (performed by TLC); "One Week" – Paul Martin (performed by Barenaked Ladies); "What's It Gonna Be?!" – Regan Jackson (performed by Busta Rhymes featuring Janet Jackson)	

=== 2000s ===
Year	Winner(s)	Work	Nominees	Ref.
2000	Colin Strause	"Californication" (performed by Red Hot Chili Peppers)	"Do Something" – Nigel Phelps (performed by Macy Gray); "Pumping on Your Stereo" – Garth Jennings (performed by Supergrass); "Take a Picture" – Cara Yoshimoto (performed by Filter)	
2001	Val Wilt	"Weapon of Choice" (performed by Fatboy Slim)	"Clint Eastwood" – Pete Candeland and Jamie Hewlett (performed by Gorillaz); "Jaded" – Laura Fox (performed by Aerosmith); "Lady Marmalade" – Bernadette Dus (performed by Christina Aguilera, Lil' Kim, Mýa and P!nk featuring Missy Elliott)	
2002	Tim Hope	"Trouble" (performed by Coldplay)	"One Minute Man" – Charles Infante (performed by Missy Elliott featuring Ludacris and Trina); "Stick 'Em Up" – Bruton Jones (performed by Quarashi); "This Train Don't Stop There Anymore" – Kirsten Vallow (performed by Elton John)	
2003	Chris Hopewell	"There There" (performed by Radiohead)	"Go with the Flow" – Tracey Gallacher (performed by Queens of the Stone Age); "Hurt" – Ruby Guidara (performed by Johnny Cash); "I'm Glad" – Chad Yaro (performed by Jennifer Lopez); "Work It" – Charles Infante (performed by Missy Elliott)	
2004	Eric Beauchamp	"Hey Ya!" (performed by Outkast)	"It's My Life" – Kristen Vallow (performed by No Doubt); "Maps" – Jeff Everett (performed by Yeah Yeah Yeahs); "Walkie Talkie Man" – Lauri Faggioni (performed by Steriogram); "You Don't Know My Name" – Rob Buono (performed by Alicia Keys)	
2005	Zach Matthews	"What You Waiting For?" (performed by Gwen Stefani)	"American Idiot" – Jan Roelfs (performed by Green Day); "Blue Orchid" – Sue Tebbutt (performed by The White Stripes); "B.Y.O.B." – Jeremy Reed (performed by System of a Down); "Mr. Brightside" – Laura Fox (performed by The Killers)	
2006	Justin Dragonas	"Dani California" (performed by Red Hot Chili Peppers)	"Hips Don't Lie" – Laura Fox (performed by Shakira featuring Wyclef Jean); "I Write Sins Not Tragedies" – Lindy McMichael, Jamie Drake and Erin Wieczorek (performed by Panic! at the Disco); "Testify" – David Ross (performed by Common); "Wasteland" – Trae King (performed by 10 Years)	
2007	—N/a			
2008	Happy Massee and Kells Jesse	"Run" (performed by Gnarls Barkley)	"Conquest" – David Fitzpatrick (performed by The White Stripes); "Electric Feel" – Sophie Kosofsky (performed by MGMT); "I Kissed a Girl" – Benji Bamps (performed by Katy Perry); "When I Grow Up" – Marcelle Gravel (performed by The Pussycat Dolls)	
2009	Jason Hamilton	"Paparazzi" (performed by Lady Gaga)	"Circus" – Laura Fox and Charles Varga (performed by Britney Spears); "Single Ladies (Put a Ring on It)" – Niamh Byrne (performed by Beyoncé); "Viva la Vida" – Gregory de Maria (performed by Coldplay); "Who's Gonna Save My Soul" – Zach Matthews (performed by Gnarls Barkley)	

=== 2010s ===
Year	Winner(s)	Work	Nominees	Ref.
2010	Louise Corcoran and Aldene Johnson	"Dog Days Are Over" (performed by Florence and the Machine)	"Bad Romance" – Charles Infante (performed by Lady Gaga); "Kings and Queens" – Marc Benacerraf (performed by Thirty Seconds to Mars); "Not Afraid" – Ethan Tobman (performed by Eminem); "Video Phone (Extended Remix)" – Lenny Tso (performed by Beyoncé featuring Lady Gaga)	
2011	Nathan Parker	"Rolling in the Deep" (performed by Adele)	"E.T." – Jason Fijal (performed by Katy Perry featuring Kanye West); "Judas" – Amy Danger (performed by Lady Gaga); "Power" – Babak Radboy (performed by Kanye West featuring Dwele); "You Are a Tourist" – Nick Gould, Tim Nackashi and Anthony Maitz (performed by Death Cab for Cutie)	
2012	Benji Bamps	"Wide Awake" (performed by Katy Perry)	"All the Rowboats" – Anthony Henderson (performed by Regina Spektor); "Born to Die" – Anna Brun and Audrey Malecot (performed by Lana Del Rey); "Little Talks" – Mihai Wilson and Marcella Moser (performed by Of Monsters and Men); "Take Care" – Jeff Higinbotham (performed by Drake featuring Rihanna)	
2013	Veronica Logsdon	"Q.U.E.E.N." (performed by Janelle Monáe featuring Erykah Badu)	"National Anthem" – Lou Asaro (performed by Lana Del Rey); "Safe and Sound" – Teri Whittaker (performed by Capital Cities); "Tessellate" – Charlie Lambros (performed by Alt-J); "Up in the Air" – Floyd Albee (performed by Thirty Seconds to Mars)	
2014	Anastasia Masaro	"Reflektor" (performed by Arcade Fire)	"Fancy" – David Courtemarche (performed by Iggy Azalea featuring Charli XCX); "Rap God" – Alex Pacion (performed by Eminem); "Tamale" – Tom Lisowski (performed by Tyler, The Creator); "Turn Down for What" – Jason Kisvarday (performed by DJ Snake and Lil Jon)	
2015	François Rousselet and Jason Fijal	"So Many Pros" (performed by Snoop Dogg)	"Bad Blood" – Charles Infante (performed by Taylor Swift featuring Kendrick Lamar); "Go" – Michel Gondry (performed by The Chemical Brothers); "Where Are Ü Now" – Brewer (performed by Skrillex and Diplo featuring Justin Bieber); "Would You Fight for My Love?" – Jack White and Jeff Peterson (performed by Jack White)	
2016	Jan Houllevigue	"Blackstar" (performed by David Bowie)	"Hello" – Colombe Raby (performed by Adele); "Hold Up" – Jason Hougaard (performed by Beyoncé); "Hotline Bling" – Jeremy MacFarlane (performed by Drake); "M.I.L.F. $" – Alexander Delgado (performed by Fergie)	
2017	Spencer Graves	"HUMBLE." (performed by Kendrick Lamar)	"24K Magic" – Alex Delgado (performed by Bruno Mars); "Bon Appétit" – Natalie Groce (performed by Katy Perry featuring Migos); "Reminder" – Lamar C Taylor and KID. STUDIO (performed by The Weeknd); "Wild Thoughts" – Damian Fyffe (performed by DJ Khaled featuring Rihanna and Bryson Tiller)	
2018	Jan Houllevigue and the Louvre	"Apeshit" (performed by The Carters)	"ATM (Addicted to Money)" – Miles Mullin (performed by J. Cole); "Look What You Made Me Do" – Brett Hess (performed by Taylor Swift); "Make Me Feel" – Pepper Nguyen (performed by Janelle Monáe); "This is America" – Jason Kisvarday (performed by Childish Gambino); "The Weekend" – SZA and Solange (performed by SZA)	
2019	John Richoux	"7 Rings" (performed by Ariana Grande)	"Boy with Luv" – JinSil Park and BoNa Kim (MU:E) (performed by BTS featuring Halsey); "Old Town Road (Remix)" – Christian Zollenkopf for Prettybird (performed by Lil Nas X featuring Billy Ray Cyrus); "Señorita" – Tatiana Van Sauter (performed by Shawn Mendes and Camila Cabello); "You Need to Calm Down" – Brittany Porter (performed by Taylor Swift); "I Love It" – Tino Schaedler (performed by Kanye West and Lil Pump featuring Adele Givens)	

=== 2020s ===
Year	Winner(s)	Work	Nominees	Ref.
2020	Christian Stone	"Mother's Daughter" (performed by Miley Cyrus)	"Adore You" – Laura Ellis Cricks (performed by Harry Styles); "Babushka Boi" – A$AP Rocky, Nadia Lee Cohen and Brittany Porter (performed by A$AP Rocky); "Boyfriend" – Tatiana Van Sauter (performed by Selena Gomez); "Lover" – Kurt Gefke (performed by Taylor Swift); "Physical" – Anna Colomé Nogu (performed by Dua Lipa)	
2021	Alec Contestabile	"Best Friend" (performed by Saweetie featuring Doja Cat)	"Already" – Susan Linns and Gerard Santos (performed by Beyoncé, Shatta Wale and Major Lazer); "Bad Habits" – Alison Dominitz (performed by Ed Sheeran); "911" – Tom Foden and Peter Andrus (performed by Lady Gaga); "Montero (Call Me by Your Name)" – John Richoux (performed by Lil Nas X); "Willow" – Ethan Tobman and Regina Fernandez (performed by Taylor Swift)	
2022	Alex Delgado	"Industry Baby" (performed by Lil Nas X and Jack Harlow)	"Get Into It (Yuh)" – Matt Sokoler (performed by Doja Cat); "Oh My God" – NuCalifornia (performed by Adele); "Simple Times" – K. K. Barrett and Alan Petherick (performed by Kacey Musgraves); "Sweetest Pie" – Tyler Evans (performed by Megan Thee Stallion and Dua Lipa); "Way 2 Sexy" – Keith Raywood (performed by Drake featuring Future and Young Thug)	
2023	Spencer Graves	"Attention" (performed by Doja Cat)	"Candy Necklace" – Brandon Mendez (performed by Lana Del Rey featuring Jon Batiste); "The Film" – Jen Dunlap (performed by Boygenius); "Her" – Wes Dogan (performed by Megan Thee Stallion); "Pink Venom" – Seo Hyun Seung (GIGANT) (performed by Blackpink); "Shirt" – Kate Bunch (performed by SZA)	
2024	Brittany Porter	"Boa" (performed by Megan Thee Stallion)	"360" – Grace Surnow (performed by Charli XCX); "Bad Idea Right?" – Nicholas des Jardins (performed by Olivia Rodrigo); "Fortnight" – Ethan Tobman (performed by Taylor Swift featuring Post Malone); "Please Please Please" – Nicholas des Jardins (performed by Sabrina Carpenter); "Rockstar" – Pongsan Thawatwichian (performed by Lisa)	
2025	Wesley Goodrich	"Abracadabra" (performed by Lady Gaga)	"APT." – Elizabet Puksto (performed by Rosé and Bruno Mars); "End of the World" – David Meyer (performed by Miley Cyrus); "Guess" – Daniel Lane (performed by Charli XCX featuring Billie Eilish); "Man of the Year" – Chad Keith and Jenny Lass (performed by Lorde); "Not Like Us" – Freyja Bardell (performed by Kendrick Lamar)	
2026	Furmaan Ahmed	"Stateside + Zara Larsson" (performed by PinkPantheress and Zara Larsson)	Confessions II – The Film – TORSO and Arthur de Borman (performed by Madonna); "My Body Isn't Ready" – Olivia McManus (performed by Sombr); "Runway" – Freyja Bardell (performed by Lady Gaga and Doechii); "SS26" – Nicola Scarlino (performed by Charli XCX); "The Fate of Ophelia" – Ethan Tobman (performed by Taylor Swift)	

== Art Director Statistics ==
=== Multiple wins ===
2 wins

- Jan Houllevigue
- K. K. Barrett
- Spencer Graves

=== Multiple nominations ===
5 nominations

- Tom Foden

4 nominations

- Charles Infante
- Ethan Tobman
- K. K. Barrett
- Laura Fox

3 nominations

- Alexander Delgado (Note: A.K.A. Alex Delgado)
- Brittany Porter
- Bryan Jones
- Nigel Phelps

2 nominations

- Benji Bamps
- Freyja Bardell
- Godley & Creme
- Happy Massee
- Jan Houllevigue
- Jan Peter Flack
- Jason Fijal
- Jason Kisvarday
- Jim Blashfield
- John Richoux
- José Montaño
- Kim Colefax
- Kristen Vallow
- Lynn-Maree Milburn
- Michel Gondry
- Nicholas des Jardins
- Regan Jackson
- Spencer Graves
- Steven Barron
- Tatiana Van Sauter
- Teri Whittaker
- Vance Lorenzini
- Zach Matthews

== Artist Statistics ==
=== Multiple wins ===
3 wins

- Red Hot Chili Peppers

2 wins

- Doja Cat (Note: 1 as a featured artist.)
- Lady Gaga
- Madonna

=== Multiple nominations ===
7 nominations

- Lady Gaga (Note: 1 as a featured artist.)
- Madonna
- Taylor Swift

5 nominations

- Beyoncé (Note: 1 with The Carters.)

4 nominations

- Aerosmith
- Charli XCX (Note: 1 as a featured artist.)
- Katy Perry

3 nominations

- Adele
- Björk
- Doja Cat (Note: 1 as a featured artist.)
- Drake
- Janet Jackson (Note: 1 as a featured artist.)
- Kanye West (Note: 1 as a featured artist.)
- Kendrick Lamar (Note: 1 as a featured artist.)
- Lana Del Rey
- Lil Nas X
- Megan Thee Stallion
- Missy Elliott (Note: 1 as a featured artist.)
- Red Hot Chili Peppers
- R.E.M.

2 nominations

- Bruno Mars
- Coldplay
- Dua Lipa
- Eminem
- Faith No More
- George Michael
- Gnarls Barkley
- INXS
- Janelle Monáe
- Michael Jackson
- Miley Cyrus
- Nine Inch Nails
- Rihanna (Note: Both as a featured artist.)
- SZA (Note: 1 also as art director.)
- The White Stripes
- Thirty Seconds to Mars
- TLC
