= Homecoming (Short Stack album) =

Studio album by Short Stack
- Released: 21 August 2015
- Length: 36:59
- Label: Mercury / Universal Music Australia
- Producer: Chris Kimsey

Short Stack chronology
Dance with Me (2015)	Homecoming (2015)	Maybe There's No Heaven (2022)

Singles from Homecoming
- 1. "Amy" Released: 5 July 2015; 2. "Gravity" Released: 14 August 2015

Homecoming is the third studio album by Australian pop punk band Short Stack and first released through Mercury/Universal Music. The album was released on 21 August 2015 and peaked at number 5 on the ARIA charts, becoming the band's second top five album.

== Background and release ==
Short Stack were founded in 2005 by Shaun Diviney (lead vocals, guitar), Andy Clemmensen (backing vocals, bass) and Bradie Webb (drums), who met as students at the Hunter School of the Performing Arts. The band released two studio albums and toured with acts as Simple Plan, McFly, The Veronicas and Good Charlotte.

After a two year break from 2012-2014, Short Stack recommenced writing and subsequently and in April 2014 released the single "Television".

The band signed to Universal Music Australia in 2014 and recorded Homecoming in the United Kingdom with veteran producer Chris Kimsey. The album was proceeded by Dance with Me (EP) and singles "Amy" and "Gravity" and released on 21 August 2015.

== Reception ==
Professional ratings
Review scores
Source	Rating
The Music AU	3.5/5 stars

Jessica Thomas from Renowned for Sound called the album "a refreshing change from the emo fringes and angst ridden lyrics you might be accustomed to." Thomas said "Homecoming is a sentimental record in the sense that it's their return to the music industry as a group, this record is all about the music, its catchy riffs layered with infectious drumbeats combined with Shaun Diviney's captivating vocal ability.

Aneta Grulichova from The Music AU said "The guys are back stronger, more mature and with a new sound" callout out 'catchy' "Dance With Me" and 'pop-rock singalong' "Elvis". Grulichova said "Short Stack have knocked this one out of the park — great new sound and direction."

== Track listing ==
All tracks are written by Short Stack.

No.	Title	Length
1.	"Dance With Me"	3:22
2.	"Elvis"	2:46
3.	"Gravity"	3:55
4.	"Homecoming"	3:30
5.	"Bambi"	3:23
6.	"Amy"	4:16
7.	"Golden Boy"	3:52
8.	"Bad Religion"	4:57
9.	"Parades"	3:07
10.	"Suburbia"	3:43
11.	"Amy (acoustic)" (iTunes exclusive track)
12.	"Gravity (acoustic)" (iTunes exclusive track)

== Charts ==
Chart (2015)	Peak position
Australian Albums (ARIA)	5
