= Vance Lorenzini =

American production designer

Vance Lorenzini was an American production designer who has produced and designed thousands of television commercials and music videos, as well as several feature films and television projects.

He collaborated with American filmmakers and producers including Roland Emmerich, Michael Bay, Adrian Lyne, David Fincher, Dominic Sena, Antoine Fuqua, George Lucas, Joe Pytka, Leslie Dektor, Tony Scott, Brett Ratner, Tim Story, F. Gary Gray, Marcus Nispel, and Forest Whitaker. He made videos for music artists Madonna, Kanye West, Mariah Carey, Jennifer Lopez, Staind, Janet Jackson, Michael Jackson, Elton John, ZZ Top, Puddle of Mudd, Prince, Snoop Dogg, Nine Inch Nails, Eminem, Limp Bizkit, and Aerosmith. Advertising clients have included Nike, Budweiser, Apple Inc., Coca-Cola, Pepsi, Ford, BMW, Levis, Kodak, United Airlines, Miller Beer, and Porsche.

He was recognized with numerous awards and certifications of artistic excellence. The Museum of Modern Art NY has honored his collective work.

== Works ==
=== Music videos ===
Year	Song	Singer/Band	Role
1989	"Express Yourself"	Madonna	Production Designer
1989	Janet Jackson's Rhythm Nation 1814	Janet Jackson	Production Designer
1993	"Livin' on the Edge"	Aerosmith	Production Designer
1995	"Runaway"	Janet Jackson	Production Designer
1997	"Spice Up Your Life"	Spice Girls	Production Designer
1998	"Victory"	Puff Daddy	Production Designer
2001	"Crawling"	Linkin Park	Production Designer
2001	"It's Been Awhile"	Staind	Production Designer
2002	"Don't Stop (Funkin' 4 Jamaica)"	Mariah Carey	Production Designer
2002	"I Stand Alone"	Godsmack	Production Designer
2005	"Only"	Nine Inch Nails	Production Designer
2005	"Shake It Off"	Mariah Carey	Production Designer
2007	"Stronger"	Kanye West	Production Designer
2007	"Can't Tell Me Nothing"	Kanye West	Production Designer

== Awards ==
- 1989 MTV Video Music Awards, Best Art Direction In A Video (Winner), 1989, Madonna, "Express Yourself"
- 1993 MTV Video Music Awards, Best Art Director In A Video (Nominee), 1993, Aerosmith - "Livin' on the Edge"
- Grammy, Best Music Video - Long Form, 1989, Janet Jackson, Rhythm Nation 1814 (Vance Lorenzini: Production Designer)
- CLIO, Best Television / Cinema, 1995, Pepsi "Algebra" (Vance Lorenzini: Production Designer)
- CLIO, Best Television / Cinema, 1991, AT&T "Jump" (Vance Lorenzini: Production Designer)
- CLIO, Best Television / Cinema, 1988, Apple Inc. "Power Lunch" - BBDO / New York (Vance Lorenzini: Production Designer)
- CLIO, Best Television / Cinema, 1987, Pacific Bell "Depression" - Foote, Cone & Bellding (Vance Lorenzini: Production Designer)
- CLIO, Best Television / Cinema, 1987, Michelob "Night Moves" - Needham / Chicago (Vance Lorenzini: Production Designer)
- CLIO, Best Television / Cinema, 1987, Pepsi "Copier" (Vance Lorenzini: Production Designer)
- CLIO, Best Television / Cinema, 1986, John Hancock "How Much Are You Making?" (Vance Lorenzini: Production Designer)
- CLIO, Best Television / Cinema, 1986, United Airlines "First Time" (Vance Lorenzini: Production Designer)
- CLIO, Best Television / Cinema, 1986, Henry Weinhard's Reserve "Saloon" (Vance Lorenzini: Production Designer)
- CLIO, Best Television / Cinema, 1986, Henry Weinhard's Private Reserve "Bottling" - Ogilvy & Mather (Vance Lorenzini: Production Designer)
- CLIO, Best Television / Cinema, 1985, Bud Light "Factory" (Vance Lorenzini: Production Designer)
- CLIO, Best Television / Cinema, 1985, Bud Light "Heartland" (Vance Lorenzini: Production Designer)
- CLIO, Best Television / Cinema, 1983, Henry Weinhard's Private Reserve "Names" - Ogilvy & Mather (Vance Lorenzini: Production Designer)
- CLIO, Best Television / Cinema, 1983, Henry Weinhard's Private Reserve "Future / Gallup" - Ogilvy & Mather (Vance Lorenzini: Production Designer)
- CLIO, Best Television / Cinema, 1983, Calvin Klein "Stretching" (Vance Lorenzini: Production Designer)
- CLIO, Best Television / Cinema, 1982, Kodak Colorburst "Homecoming II" Young & Rubicam / New York (Vance Lorenzini: Production Designer)
- CLIO, Best Television / Cinema, 1982, Bud Light "Football" - Needham & Harper (Vance Lorenzini: Production Designer)
- CLIO, Best Television / Cinema, 1981, Henry Weinhard's Reserve "Alaska" - Ogilvy & Mather / San Francisco (Vance Lorenzini: Production Designer)
- CLIO, Best Television / Cinema, 1981, McDonald's "Moving" Needham, Harper & Steers / Chicago (Vance Lorenzini: Production Designer)
- CLIO, Best Television / Cinema, 1980, Yamaha "Beauty or the Beast" - Chiat / Day (Vance Lorenzini: Production Designer)
