= Shake for the Sheik =

1988 single by the Escape Club

Single by The Escape Club

from the album Wild Wild West
- B-side: "Working for the Fatman"
- Released: 1988
- Recorded: 1987
- Genre: Dance-rock
- Length: 4:02 (LP version); 3:40 (Single version)
- Label: Atlantic
- Songwriter(s): The Escape Club
- Producer(s): Chris Kimsey

The Escape Club singles chronology
"Wild Wild West" (1988)	"Shake for the Sheik" (1988)	"Walking Through Walls" (1989)

"Shake for the Sheik" is a song by English pop-rock band the Escape Club, from their 1988 album Wild Wild West. Written by the band members and produced by Chris Kimsey, the song was released as the album's second single and reached number 28 on the U.S. Billboard Hot 100 chart in January 1989.

== Release and reception ==
"Shake for the Sheik", the follow-up to the U.S. number one hit "Wild, Wild West", was released as a single in November 1988. The song entered the Billboard Hot 100 singles chart at number 81 in December. The song spent five weeks in the Top 40 section of the chart, peaking at number 28 in January 1989. The single remained on the Hot 100 for 14 weeks. "Shake for the Sheik" reached number 24 on the Singles Sales chart and number 28 on the Hot 100 Airplay chart. The song also reached number 46 on the New Zealand Singles Chart.

Lead vocalist Trevor Steel said the song "was going down well, especially since we considered ourselves a live band. The humor of the title was a little lost on the U.S. audience, since Americans pronounce Sheik differently than we in the UK do."

== Track listing ==
7" Vinyl (U.S.)

1. "Shake for the Sheik" – 3:40
2. "Working for the Fatman" – 3:00

12" Vinyl (U.S., Canada)

1. "Shake for the Sheik" (Dance version) – 7:22
2. "Shake for the Sheik" (Single edit) – 3:45
3. "Shake for the Sheik" (Dub mix) – 6:17
4. "Working for the Fatman" – 3:00

== Charts ==
Chart (1989)	Peak position
Australia (ARIA Charts)	114
U.S. Billboard Hot 100	28
New Zealand Singles Chart	46
