= Channel V Oz Artist of the Year =

Award by Channel V Australia

The Channel V Oz Artist of the Year was an annual award presented by Channel V Australia and is voted by the Australian public, and is awarded to the artist on the same day as the annual ARIA Music Awards presentation events. Since its inauguration in 1997, Silverchair has won the Artist of the Year award for six consecutive years, from 1997 to 2002.

== Channel [V] Oz Artist of the Year award ==
=== 1997 ===
- Jebediah
- Tina Arena
- Crowded House
- Savage Garden
- Silverchair

=== 1998 ===
- Grinspoon
- Savage Garden
- Regurgitator
- The Living End
- Silverchair

=== 1999 ===
- Powderfinger
- Silverchair
- Frenzal Rhomb
- Human Nature
- The Living End

=== 2000 ===
- Silverchair
- Killing Heidi
- Powderfinger
- Bardot
- Savage Garden

=== 2001 ===
- Silverchair
- Powderfinger
- Something For Kate
- Bardot
- Kylie Minogue

=== 2002 ===
- Silverchair
- John Butler Trio
- Kylie Minogue
- Grinspoon
- Darren Hayes

=== 2003 ===
- Delta Goodrem
- Silverchair
- Powderfinger
- Something For Kate
- Grinspoon

=== 2004 ===
- Guy Sebastian
- Jet
- Delta Goodrem
- Grinspoon
- John Butler Trio

=== 2005 ===
- Anthony Callea
- Kisschasy
- Missy Higgins
- The Veronicas

=== 2006 ===
- Eskimo Joe
- Rogue Traders
- The Veronicas
- Wolfmother

=== 2007 ===
- Silverchair
- Evermore
- The Veronicas
- Kisschasy

=== 2008 ===
- The Getaway Plan
- Short Stack
- The Living End
- Kisschasy
- The Veronicas

=== 2009 ===
- Bliss N Eso
- Empire Of The Sun
- Kisschasy
- Short Stack

=== 2010 ===
- Bliss n Eso
- Short Stack
- John Butler Trio
- Amy Meredith

=== 2011 ===
- 360
- Guy Sebastian
- New Empire
- Short Stack

=== 2012 ===
- Ball Park Music
- Delta Goodrem
- Reece Mastin
- Seth Sentry

=== 2013 ===
- 5 Seconds of Summer

=== 2014 ===
- 5 Seconds of Summer
- The Amity Affliction
- Troye Sivan

== See also ==
- List of Australian music television shows
