= Short Stack =

Australian pop rock band

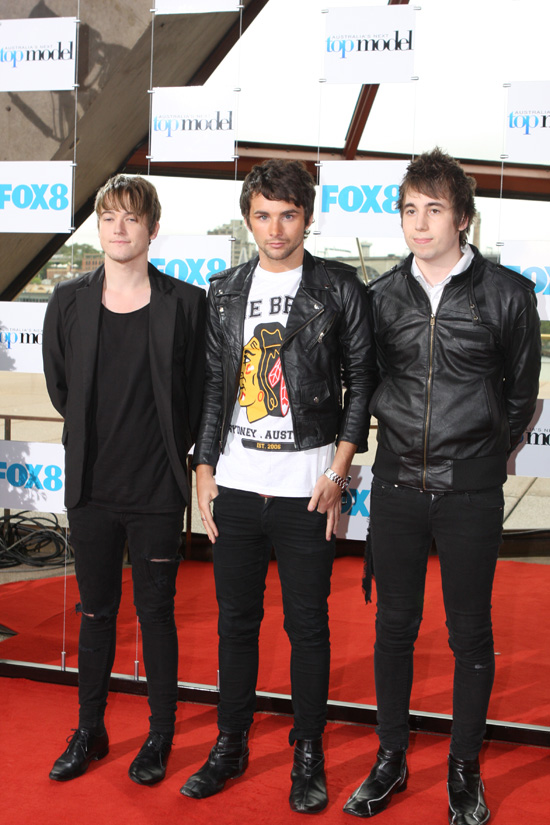
- Short Stack in 2011

Background information
- Origin: Budgewoi, New South Wales, Australia
- Genres: Pop punk, alternative rock, pop rock, emo
- Years active: 2005–2012; 2014–2015; 2020–present
- Labels: Sunday Morning Records (2009–2013); Universal Music Australia (2015); UNFD (2021–present)
- Members: Shaun Diviney; Andy Clemmensen; Bradie Webb
- Past members: Shannon Hotchkins
- Website: www.shortstackband.com

Short Stack are an Australian pop punk band. The band consists of members Shaun Diviney (lead vocals, guitar), Andy Clemmensen (bass, backing vocals) and Bradie Webb (drums). Shannon Hotchkins was also a member of Short Stack before any song was performed or recorded.

Short Stack were twice named Channel V Oz Artist of the Year, and produced two gold-selling albums, three top ten singles, a ARIA number one chart award and a platinum-selling single.

The group split in 2012, and their former label released Art Vandelay the following year without any promotion. In April 2014, the band announced their reformation and shortly released "Television". "Amy" was released as the lead single from third studio album Homecoming in August 2015. They disbanded shortly after in 2015.

They announced their return with a tour in 2020. They released their first song in six years "Burn You Down" in March 2021.

== History ==
=== 2002–2005: Formation of Short Stack ===
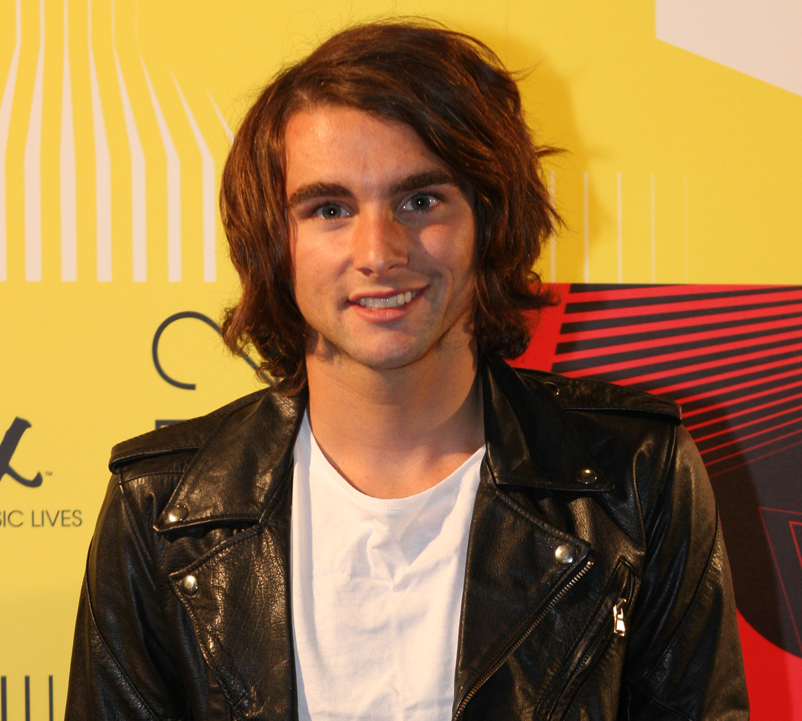
Shaun Diviney (pictured) is the lead vocalist of Short Stack.

Shaun Diviney, Andy Clemmensen and Bradie Webb met on the train to the Hunter School of Performing Arts in Newcastle, New South Wales. Eventually, they decided to form a band and named it Short Stack. Originally, Shannon Hotchkins played drums, Webb played guitar, Clemmensen played bass and Diviney was the lead vocalist. However, after Hotchkins left, Diviney heard Webb playing on the drums and realised that he had the talent for drumming. Diviney became the lead vocalist and guitarist, Clemmensen stayed on bass, and Webb became the drummer.

=== 2005–2009: Early years & Stack Is the New Black ===
Three years after the band members met, they entered Youthrock, a competition for school-based bands. They failed to pass the first round in 2005, but were inspired to continue with their careers and made a limited-edition release of their first album, One Size Fits All, produced by Webb. They saved up money, and later released around 40 copies throughout local schools and the community.

They later returned to Youthrock in 2006, placing third. This was where they met Trevor Steel and Chris Johns of indie label Sunday Morning Records, who then signed the band in August 2007.

In 2008, Short Stack was awarded Channel V Oz Artist of the Year Award, beating other popular acts such as The Getaway Plan, The Living End, The Veronicas and Kisschasy.

On 14 August 2009, Short Stack released their debut album, Stack Is the New Black. The band has released four singles, "Shimmy a Go Go", "Princess", "Sway, Sway Baby!" and "Ladies & Gentlemen". "Sway, Sway Baby!" debuted at number 2 on the ARIA singles chart, making it the highest ranking debut on the week of its release; it dropped 25 places during the following week.

Short Stack was awarded runner-up of the Oz Artist of the Year 2009, losing the award to Kisschasy.

=== 2010–2011: This Is Bat Country ===
On 29 July 2010, Diviney announced that the first official single from their second album would be titled "Planets". On 24 September, to coincide with the release of "Planets", Short Stack performed the song live at Federation Square in Melbourne. The event was televised live on Sunrise.

In an interview with The Music Network, the band revealed the new album was produced by Lee Groves and would be released in November. Shaun Diviney also announced a new orchestral sound, stating: "We've been having fun looking backward through music rather than going down the electro-pop route which everybody seems to be doing now." Webb added: "It's a lot more laid back. Less thrashy, more sexy."

Their second album, This Is Bat Country, was released on 12 November 2010.

On 18 October, Short Stack performed "Planets" live on The X Factor. On the same day, This Is Bat Country became available for pre-order, with a collector's limited edition pack including an action figure of the band and an exclusively signed poster.

On 2 November, Universal Music Australia confirmed that Short Stack would appear on the cover of issue #709 of the Australian edition of Rolling Stone magazine. In November, Short Stack won their second Channel V Oz Artist of the Year Award from Channel V, beating artists such as Bliss n Eso, the John Butler Trio and Amy Meredith.

Also in November, Short Stack went on a meet and greet tour around the country to promote the release of This Is Bat Country. On 14 November, they performed "Planets" and "We Dance to a Different Disco, Honey" on Telethon. The third single from This Is Bat Country, "Heartbreak Made Me a Killer", was released as an EP on 25 March 2011. Short Stack opened for Good Charlotte as part of their Cardiology Tour in Australia in April 2011.

Short Stack toured Australia on their This Is Bat Country tour in July 2011. On 11 May 2011, Diviney appeared on the panel of the ABC game show Spicks and Specks.

=== 2011–2012: "Bang Bang Sexy" and breakup ===
The cover of The Story of Short Stack, a documentary by Clemmensen about the band.

Their last single "Bang Bang Sexy" was released on 19 September 2011.

Short Stack were nominated to win Channel V Oz Artist of the Year. They made the top 4 alongside 360, Guy Sebastian and New Empire.

The band also released their first documentary, The Story of Short Stack, based on their road to success. It was directed, produced and edited by Clemmensen. In the documentary, the name of the new album was released as Art Vandelay, as well as the track listing for that album.

On 30 March 2012, Short Stack announced via their Facebook page that they would no longer be making music together stating that "even though we are no longer making music, we still remain the closest friends." Along with the announcement they released their last ever song and music video, "S.O.U.L.". This also halted the making of Art Vandelay and concluded Short Stack forever.

"Dear friends, As you may be aware, stack is no more. To everyone who has supported the band in any way, I cannot thank you enough. From the ones who told their friends about us to the ones who camped out before shows. For me, since the band started when I was 15, it's always been about the music I wrote and how it effected people. The greatest feeling was you singing my words back at a show, living with the albums and letting something I created be a part of your lives. These times will be some of the best of my life with the boys/the crew and we still remain the closest friends. But the show must go on. If you try to recapture yesterday you will only lose tomorrow. I am starting work on my next project which is honestly the best thing I have ever done. I'm falling in love with music all over again, feeling a fire I haven't in years. I'm heading over to LA / NY mid year to write and do music, working with artists I love & enjoying life but most importantly I feel it's time to START something again. See you on the road soon, Diviney."

— Short Stack, Facebook and Twitter

=== 2012–2013: Post-breakup ===
Short Stack's album, Art Vandelay, was released after the band's initial breakup.

Diviney has continued his music career, which he is enthusiastic about. He made a trip to Los Angeles in mid-2012 to write some more music for his solo career. Diviney also announced that Webb is likely to continue his career in producing music and that Clemmensen aims to pursue a future in film directing.

On 15 October 2012, it was announced that Clemmensen would make an appearance in the long-running soap opera Neighbours. Clemmensen's character, Harry Vass, competes against Sophie Ramsay (Kaiya Jones) during an open mic night.

Diviney's new project/band, he announced a tour of Australia, playing in Brisbane, Sydney and Melbourne. In a question and answer Diviney posted, they announced that they would also tour England and release their first studio album and single during 2013. On 23 December 2012, Diviney announced their Sydney gig was sold out, the first (and currently only) of the shows to sell out. Diviney's debut EP Sex Games was released on 28 June 2013, and was a success, topping Australian rock album charts within hours of its release.

Art Vandelay was officially released on 18 October 2013.

=== 2014–2015: Short reformation for Homecoming and second break up ===
On 13 April 2014, Short Stack announced they had reunited and posted about their new single "Television" and two upcoming exclusive shows.

On 6 March 2015, the band released the single "Dance with Me", followed by an EP of the same name on 27 March 2015. The EP peaked at number 12 on the Australian album chart.

The band's third studio album Homecoming was released on 21 August 2015, proceeded by two singles. Homecoming peaked at number 5 on the ARIA Charts.

They later disbanded after deciding that they no longer wanted to continue with the band. Diviney stated in Junkee that, "We all wanted to do different things. Andy wanted to travel. Bradie opened his own drum studio and then I sort of was doing my own thing so we just wanted to take a break."

=== 2020–present: Second reunion and Maybe There's No Heaven ===
On 3 February 2020, Short Stack announced via their Facebook page that they had reunited for a second time. It was revealed soon after that to celebrate the reunion they would be going on their first tour in four years. The tour was scheduled for July 2020, featuring fellow Australian band Between You & Me.

On 2 March 2021, Short Stack released their first song in six years, "Burn You Down" with new recording label UNFD.

In December 2021, the group announced that their fourth album, Maybe There's No Heaven, was set for release in February 2022 and released the album's third single "Love You Like I Used To". On 9 February 2022, the group delayed the album's release to 8 April 2022, citing "a desire to tie its launch in to their forthcoming national tour" in a press conference. On 11 February 2022, they released the album's fourth single, "Armageddon".

== Discography ==
=== Albums ===
==== Studio albums ====
Title	Album details	Peak chart positions	Certifications (sales thresholds)
Title	Album details	AUS	Certifications (sales thresholds)
Stack Is the New Black	Released: 14 August 2009; Label: Sunday Morning (SMR0004); Formats: CD, digital download	1	ARIA: Gold
This Is Bat Country	Released: 12 November 2010; Label: Sunday Morning (SMR0018); Formats: CD, digital download	6	ARIA: Gold
Homecoming	Release date: 21 August 2015; Label: Mercury (4744098); Formats: CD, digital download	5	
Maybe There's No Heaven	Released: 8 April 2022; Label: UNFD (UNFD149CD); Formats: CD, LP, digital download	8	

==== Compilation albums ====
Title	Album details
Art Vandelay	Released: 18 October 2013; Label: Sunday Morning; Format: Digital download

==== Demo albums ====
Title	Album details
One Size Fits All	Released: 2005; Format: CD; Note: Promotional album, only 40 copies (all gifted)

=== Extended plays ===
Title	EP details	Peak chart positions
Title	EP details	AUS
Dance with Me	Released: 27 March 2015; Label: Short Stack, Universal Music Australia (4720826); Formats: CD, digital download	12

=== Singles ===
Year	Single	Chart peak positions	Certifications (sales thresholds)	Album
Year	Single	AUS	Certifications (sales thresholds)	Album
2008	"Shimmy a Go Go"	31		Stack Is the New Black
2009	"Princess"	11		Stack Is the New Black
2009	"Sway, Sway Baby!"	2		Stack Is the New Black
2009	"Ladies & Gentlemen"	—		Stack Is the New Black
2009	"Sweet December"	8		This Is Bat Country
2010	"Planets"	4	ARIA: Platinum	This Is Bat Country
2010	"We Dance to a Different Disco, Honey"	43		This Is Bat Country
2011	"Heartbreak Made Me a Killer"	93		This Is Bat Country
2011	"Bang Bang Sexy"	98		Art Vandelay
2012	"S.O.U.L."	—		Art Vandelay
2014	"Television"	47		non album single
2015	"Dance with Me"	—		Dance with Me
2015	"Amy"	—		Homecoming
2015	"Gravity"	—		Homecoming
2021	"Burn You Down"	—		Maybe There's No Heaven
2021	"Live4"	—		Maybe There's No Heaven
2021	"Love You Like I Used To"	—		Maybe There's No Heaven
2022	"Armageddon"	—		Maybe There's No Heaven
2022	"Sunshine"	—		Maybe There's No Heaven
2023	"Shotgun Wedding"	—		TBA
2023	"IDGAF"	—		TBA

=== Music videos ===
Year	Song	Director
2008	"Sway, Sway Baby!"	Shaun Diviney
2008	"Drop Dead Gorgeous"	Dan Reisinger
2008	"Shimmy a Go Go"	Dan Reisinger
2009	"Princess"	Dan Reisinger
2009	"Sway, Sway Baby!" (remake)	Dan Reisinger
2009	"Ladies & Gentlemen"	Dan Reisinger
2009	"Sweet December"	Dan Reisinger
2010	"Planets"	Dan Reisinger
2010	"We Dance to a Different Disco, Honey"	Dan Reisinger
2011	"Heartbreak Made Me a Killer"	Benn Jae & Tony Prescott
2011	"Bang Bang Sexy"	Dan Reisigner
2012	"S.O.U.L."	Andy Clemmensen
2014	"Television"	Short Stack
2015	"Dance With Me"	
2015	"Amy"	
2015	"Gravity"	
2021	"Burn You Down"	Elder
2021	"Live4"	
2021	"Love You Like I Used To"	

== Filmography ==
Year	Title	Diviney's role	Clemmensen's role	Webb's role	Notes
2005	Blokeman skit	—N/a	Kevin	—N/a	For Comedy Channel.
2007 – present	Short Stack TV	Himself	Himself	Himself	Online TV show on YouTube
2010	Spicks and Specks	Himself	—N/a	—N/a	For Australian Broadcasting Corporation
2011	Stay Tuned	Himself	Himself	Himself	For Australian Broadcasting Corporation
2011	The Story of Short Stack	Himself	Himself	Himself	Documentary about band. Directed and produced by Clemmensen.
2012	Neighbours	—N/a	Harry Vass	—N/a	Australian soap opera

== Touring ==
Short Stack have toured several times, to promote each of their albums, and often held meet and greets.

In 2015, they opened for The Vamps in their Australian tour but they were later asked to leave the tour by the Vamps management.

Before their release of Homecoming, and after the release of their Dance with Me EP, they played a secret shows tour around Australia. In 2016, they planned summer shows in mid January and December, for the release of their album Homecoming.

=== Tours ===
Start date	End date	Name	Opening acts
11 December 2009	19 December 2009	Stack Is the New Black Tour	The Sundance Kids & Die For You
26 March 2010	24 April 2010	Stack Is the New Black – Part 2 Tour	For Our Hero
1 July 2011	30 July 2011	This Is Bat Country Tour	Heroes For Hire & Because They Can
2 April 2015	19 April 2015	Secret Shows Tour	With Confidence & Move on Be Strong
11 December 2015	6 February 2016	Homecoming Tour	Storm the Sky, Masketta Fall, Young Lions, Move on Be Strong, and Red Beard

== Awards and nominations ==
=== APRA Awards ===
The APRA Awards are presented annually from 1982 by the Australasian Performing Right Association (APRA), "honouring composers and songwriters".

Year	Nominee / work	Award	Result
2012	"Heartbreak Made Me a Killer" (Shaun Diviney)	Rock Work of the Year	Nominated

=== Other awards ===
Year	Nominee / work	Award	Result
2008	Short Stack	Channel V Oz Artist of the Year	Won
2009	Short Stack	Channel V Oz Artist of the Year	Nominated
2009	Shaun Diviney	Nickelodeon Kids' Choice Awards: Hottest Aussie Male	Nominated
2009	"Sway, Sway Baby!"	Nickelodeon Kids' Choice Awards: Fave Song	Nominated
2009	Short Stack	Nickelodeon Kids' Choice Awards: Fave Aussie Band	Won
2010	Short Stack	Channel V Oz Artist of the Year	Won
2011	Short Stack	Channel V Oz Artist of the Year	Nominated
