= The Wonder Years: Music from the Emmy Award-Winning Show & Its Era =

The Wonder Years: Music From the Emmy Award-Winning Show & Its Era

Soundtrack album by Various artists
- Released: October 3, 1989
- Genre: Rock; pop
- Length: 44:35
- Label: Atlantic
- Producer: Toby Emmerich; Karen Gibson

Professional ratings
Review scores
Source	Rating
Allmusic	2.5/5 stars

The Wonder Years: Music From the Emmy Award-Winning Show & Its Era is a soundtrack album to the TV series The Wonder Years. Released through Atlantic Records on October 3, 1989, the album features eight modern cover songs, four original recordings from the 1960s, and one new song.

The album was reissued in 2016 for Black Friday Record Store Day, in yellow translucent vinyl.

== Track listing ==
Side A
No.	Title	Writer(s)	Artist(s)	Length
1.	"With a Little Help from My Friends"	Lennon–McCartney	Joe Cocker	4:14
2.	"Baby I Need Your Loving"	Holland–Dozier–Holland	Was (Not Was)	2:52
3.	"Drift Away"	Mentor Williams	Judson Spence	3:54
4.	"For What It's Worth (Stop, Hey What's That Sound)"	Stephen Stills	Buffalo Springfield	2:35
5.	"Get Together"	Chet Powers	Indigo Girls	3:30
6.	"In The Still of the Night (I'll Remember)"	Fred Parris	Debbie Gibson	3:54

Side B
No.	Title	Writer(s)	Artist(s)	Length
1.	"Twentieth Century Fox"	Jim Morrison; Ray Manzarek; Robby Krieger; John Densmore	The Escape Club	3:35
2.	"Ruby Tuesday"	Jagger–Richards	Julian Lennon	3:22
3.	"Teach Your Children"	Graham Nash	Crosby, Stills, Nash & Young	2:51
4.	"Brown Eyed Girl"	Van Morrison	Van Morrison	3:07
5.	"Will You Love Me Tomorrow"	Gerry Goffin; Carole King	Carole King	4:08
6.	"Come Home (Wonder Years)"	Deborah Gibson	Debbie Gibson	2:03

CD bonus track
No.	Title	Writer(s)	Artist(s)	Length
13.	"Peace Train"	Cat Stevens	Richie Havens	4:30
Total length:				44:35
