= Sway, Sway Baby! =

Single by Short Stack

from the album Stack Is the New Black
- A-side: "Sway, Sway Baby!"
- B-side: "Sway, Sway Baby!" (acoustic), "Rain on Her Parade" (acoustic)
- Released: 17 July 2009
- Recorded: 2008
- Genre: Pop-punk
- Length: 2:54
- Label: Sunday Morning Recordings
- Songwriter(s): Shaun Diviney, Andy Clemmensen, Bradie Webb
- Producer(s): Trevor Steel, Shaun Diviney

Short Stack singles chronology
"Princess" (2009)	"Sway, Sway Baby!" (2009)	"Ladies & Gentlemen" (2009)

"Sway, Sway Baby!" is a song by Australian pop-punk band, Short Stack. It was released in July 2009 as the third single from their debut studio album, Stack Is the New Black. It was released to coincide with the release of their album and their Sway, Sway Baby! National Tour on 17 July 2009.

The single was available for pre-order on Short Stack's official website. Upon pre-order, each person received a personally signed copy of the single. The single received airplay on the Today Network's Hot30 Countdown and Nova 96.9 but was first played on The Leaked with Matty and Renee before being moved to their other show The Hit List with Matty and Renee.

The band performed the song live on Rove on 5 July 2009.

== Music video ==
Filmed on Bradie's camera phone, the band created a music video themselves in early 2008. The video received over 5000 views on its first day, which made it the most viewed video on the site that day. The clip is still able to be viewed on the band's YouTube channel under the title of "Short Stack TV episode 10".

A new music video was created for the song, directed by Straighty180. It features the band in several different rooms of the fictional "Sway Sway Inn".

In Room 22 Shaun, Andy and Bradie are performing the song in front of an audience, in Room 4 Shaun and Bradie are trying to teach Andy about the birds and the bees, by catching a bee and a bird and forcing them to kiss, in Room 15 The boys are having a pillow fight with three girls in red bikinis, and in Room 30 Andy is trying to sleep with a cartoon rabbit, only to have Shaun and Bradie interjecting that the rabbit is their girlfriend. It is in this sequence the band appears to parody soap opera controversies, such as those in Home and Away, a theme extended at the start of the video when the line "sway sway baby" is sung to the melody of the line Home and Away from the theme song.

"Sway, Sway Baby!" won an Inside Film Award for Best Music Video.

== Track listing ==
All tracks are written by Short Stack

iTunes single
No.	Title	Length
1.	"Sway, Sway Baby!"	2:51
2.	"Can't Get You Out of My Head" (live at the MTV Awards 2009)	3:00

CD single (SMR0014)
No.	Title	Length
1.	"Sway, Sway Baby!"	2:54
2.	"Rain on Her Parade" (acoustic version)	3:35
3.	"Sway, Sway Baby!" (acoustic version)	2:49

== Charts ==
=== Weekly charts ===
Chart (2009)	Peak position
Australia (ARIA)	2

=== Year-end charts ===
Chart (2009)	Position
Australian Artists (ARIA)	26
