= Maybe There's No Heaven =

Studio album by Short Stack
- Released: 8 April 2022
- Length: 32:05
- Label: UNFD

Short Stack chronology
Homecoming (2015)	Maybe There's No Heaven (2022)

Singles from Maybe There's No Heaven
- 1. "Burn You Down" Released: 3 March 2021; 2. "Live4" Released: 29 April 2021; 3. "Love You Like I Used To" Released: December 2021; 4. "Armageddon" Released: 11 February 2022; 5. "Sunshine" Released: 16 March 2022

Maybe There's No Heaven is the fourth studio album by Australian pop punk band Short Stack, released through UNFD on 8 April 2022. The album was announced on 1 December 2021 and scheduled for released on 25 February 2022 but on 9 February, the band delayed the release until 8 April 2022 citing "a desire to tie its launch in to their forthcoming national tour" in a press conference.

According to the band, Maybe There's No Heaven is their most authentic. In December 2021, frontman Shaun Diviney said, "There was a tension between the band that we wanted to be and the band that other people around us wanted to be". Drummer Bradie Webb added the album "isn't in any way what someone else told us we should be. [We] finally have our hands on the steering wheel."

== Reception ==
Professional ratings
Review scores
Source	Rating
Rock 'n' Load Mag	9/10
Wall of Sound	7/10

Rock 'n' Load Mag said "The Aussie punk-rock trio are back with a-10 track banger that will make their dedicated fan base very happy indeed" calling the album, "possibly their finest work to date."

Tamara May from Wall of Sound wrote: "Their first release in over a decade, Maybe There’s No Heaven celebrates everything we love about Short Stack and under a heavy music label like UNFD for the first time, it’s an album that the boys feel more in control of." May concluded the review saying "Maybe There’s No Heaven manages to fit everything we've heard from the trio, plus a few experimental surprises inbetween that are bound to keep the fans by their side. This album sees the boys joining the rest of the world in the emo-pop revolution and presents the band’s truest form yet. These songs will no doubt encourage even more pop punk listeners on the Stack train."

== Track listing ==
All tracks are written by Short Stack.

Maybe There's No Heaven track listing
No.	Title	Length
1.	"Maybe There's No Heaven"	0:49
2.	"Burn You Down"	3:06
3.	"Armageddon"	2:32
4.	"Dancing with the Devil"	3:01
5.	"Sunshine"	2:42
6.	"Love You Like I Used To"	3:45
7.	"Live4"	3:26
8.	"Shinigami"	4:07
9.	"Lights Out"	2:31
10.	"Valkyrie"	2:21
11.	"Cut Your Teeth"	3:45

== Charts ==
Chart performance for Maybe There's No Heaven
Chart (2022)	Peak position
Australian Albums (ARIA)	8
