= Nigel Phelps =

English production designer (born 1962)

- Born: 16 March 1962 (age 64); Lincolnshire, England, United Kingdom
- Education: Royal College of Art
- Occupations: Production designer, draftsman
- Years active: 1984–present

Nigel Phelps (born 16 March 1962) is an English production designer, set designer and conceptual illustrator. Phelps is best known creating the drawings of Gotham City as art director on Tim Burton's Batman (1989), for which the film's art department was honoured with an Academy Award. Phelps is also a three time MTV Video Music Award for Best Art Direction nominee.

== Life and career ==
Born in London, he trained at the Royal College of Art, London.

Phelps originally intended to be a painter. When his grant ran out at art college he had to take a job to put himself through school. During this time he met screenwriter Paul Mayersberg, who was intending to direct his first feature, Captive. Mayersberg hired Phelps as a storyboard artist and mentored Phelps on editing, camera angles and lighting by showing him films like Touch of Evil and The Lady from Shanghai. Mayersberg introduced him to Anton Furst, who hired him as a draftsman/set designer for Neil Jordan's The Company of Wolves (1984). This is where his long partnership with Furst was established, as his lead draftsman Phelps would create the set drawings for Furst to sometimes later add details and accents to. Phelps went on to create numerous drawings for Stanley Kubrick's approval during the long production of Full Metal Jacket. Tim Burton was a fan of Phelps' drawings from Company of Wolves and was unable to secure his involvement in Beetlejuice, which was filmed in the United States. When production of Burton's Batman was set up at Pinewood Studios he was hired as art director and gained worldwide attention and acclaim for his drawings of the city and interior sets.

In the aftermath of Batman Phelps designed the themes for the 1991 Planet Hollywood restaurant in New York. In 1992 DC Comics commissioned Phelps to create a new Gotham City that debuted in the three issue Destroyer story arc. Phelps was unable to design sets for Batman Returns as he was still employed by Furst in 1991, who had signed an exclusive contract with Columbia Pictures. During this time Phelps had moved to the L.A. area and eventually became a production designer in his own right, making his debut designing Mega-City One in Judge Dredd.

== Filmography ==
=== As production designer ===
- Judge Dredd (1995)
- Alien Resurrection (1997)
- In Dreams (1999)
- The Bone Collector (1999)
- Pearl Harbor (2001)
- Troy (2004)
- The Island (2005)
- The Mummy: Tomb of the Dragon Emperor (2008)
- Transformers: Revenge of the Fallen (2009)
- Transformers: Dark of the Moon (2011)
- World War Z (2013)
- Life (2017)
- Pirates of the Caribbean: Dead Men Tell No Tales (2017)
- Pokémon: Detective Pikachu (2019)
- Thor: Love and Thunder (2022)
- Riddick: Furya (TBA)

=== As art director/set designer ===
- The Company of Wolves (1984)
- The Frog Prince (1986)
- Full Metal Jacket (1987)
- High Spirits (1988)
- Batman (1989)
- Michael Jackson's MidKnight (1991 - cancelled)
- Bauhaus - Gotham (1999)

=== Music videos ===
- Guns N' Roses: "November Rain" (1992)
- En Vogue: "Free Your Mind" (1992)
- David Bowie: "Jump They Say" (1993)
- Lenny Kravitz: "Are You Gonna Go My Way" (1993)
- Macy Gray: "Do Something" (1999)
- Faith Hill: "There You'll Be" (2001)
