= I'll Be There (The Escape Club song) =

Single by The Escape Club

from the album Dollars and Sex
- Released: 1991
- Genre: Pop rock
- Length: 5:47
- Label: WEA, Atlantic
- Songwriter: The Escape Club
- Producer: Peter Wolf

The Escape Club singles chronology
"Call It Poison" (1991)	"I'll Be There" (1991)

"I'll Be There" is a song by English pop rock band the Escape Club, released in 1991 as the second single from their third album, Dollars and Sex (1991). A top-10 hit, it reached numbers eight and nine on the US Billboard Hot 100 and Cash Box Top 100.

== Background ==
Singer Trevor Steel said,

When we were recording Dollars & Sex, our third album, everyone in the record company was on us to write a ballad as that was all that radio was playing from rock bands at the time. A friend of ours’ wife died while we were in Los Angeles recording. John had come up with some chords which he left with me one night when the rest of the band were going out partying. I wrote the lyrics and left them on a table. John says that he remembers coming in that night and “seeing them in a shaft of light”. I don’t know if that story has been exaggerated over time but that’s how it was written.

== Charts ==
=== Weekly charts ===
Chart (1991)	Peak position
Australia (ARIA)	43
New Zealand (Recorded Music NZ)	42
US Billboard Hot 100	8
US Cash Box Top 100	9

=== Year-end charts ===
Chart (1991)	Position
US Billboard Hot 100	65
