= Princess (Short Stack song) =

Single by Short Stack

from the album Stack Is the New Black
- Released: 27 February 2009
- Recorded: 2008
- Genre: Pop punk
- Length: 3:22
- Label: Sunday Morning Records
- Songwriter(s): Shaun Diviney, Andy Clemmensen, Bradie Webb
- Producer(s): Craig Porteils, Trevor Steel

Short Stack singles chronology
"Shimmy a Go Go" (2008)	"Princess" (2009)	"Sway, Sway Baby!" (2009)

"Princess" is a song by Australian pop punk band, Short Stack. It was released in February 2009 as the second single from their debut studio album, Stack Is the New Black.

== Music video ==
Shaun Diviney smiling after he kissed the bunny.

A music video for this single takes place in the same white room for the entire duration of the video. It showcases all three members of Short Stack playing their music meanwhile being surrounded by people dancing dressed up in various animal suits such as a rabbit and bear. Two other people are also spotted in the video, one being dressed in an Elvis inspired costume and the other in a Mexican costume. Towards the end of the video, the lead singer, Shaun Diviney results in hooking up with the person in the rabbit suit as well as himself.

== Track listings ==
All tracks are written by Short Stack

iTunes single
No.	Title	Length
1.	"Princess"	3:18
2.	"One Step Closer" (live at the Annandale, 13 December 2008)	4:13

iTunes single 2
No.	Title	Length
1.	"Princess"	3:18
2.	"Before Angels Fall" (live and sold out at the Annandale 13 December 2008)	3:40
3.	"Drop Dead Gorgeous" (live and sold out at the Annandale 13 December 2008)	2:52

CD single (SMR0009)
No.	Title	Length
1.	"Princess"	3:16
2.	"We All Know"	3:25
3.	"Princess" (Q45 Club Mix)	7:21

== Charts ==
=== Weekly charts ===
Chart (2009)	Peak position
Australia (ARIA)	11

=== Year-end charts ===
Chart (2009)	Position
Australian Artists (ARIA)	32
