= Wild Wild West (album) =

Studio album by The Escape Club
- Released: July 11, 1988
- Recorded: 1987
- Studios: Maison Rouge, Air London, Westside
- Genres: Dance-rock; glam rock
- Length: 39:10
- Label: Atlantic
- Producer: Chris Kimsey

The Escape Club chronology
White Fields (1986)	Wild Wild West (1988)	Dollars and Sex (1991)

Singles from Wild Wild West
- 1. "Wild Wild West" Released: July 25, 1988; 2. "Shake for the Sheik" Released: November 9, 1988

Wild Wild West is the second album by rock band The Escape Club, released in 1988. It includes their most well-known song, "Wild, Wild West". The album also included the singles "Shake for the Sheik" and "Walking Through Walls".

Professional ratings
Review scores
Source	Rating
AllMusic	3/5 stars

== Track listing ==
- All songs written and arranged by The Escape Club.

No.	Title	Length
1.	"Wild, Wild West"	5:44
2.	"Jealousy"	3:07
3.	"Shake for the Sheik"	4:02
4.	"Walking Through Walls"	3:20
5.	"The Longest Day"	4:36
6.	"Who Do You Love?"	3:17
7.	"Staring at the Sun"	4:47
8.	"Only the Rain"	3:06
9.	"Goodbye Joey Rae"	4:28
10.	"Working for the Fatman"	2:57

== Charts ==
=== Weekly charts ===
Weekly chart performance for Wild Wild West
Chart (1988)	Peak position
Australian Albums (ARIA)	42
US Billboard 200	27

=== Year-end charts ===
1989 year-end chart performance for Wild Wild West
Chart (1989)	Position
US Billboard 200	97

== Personnel ==
=== The Escape Club ===
- Trevor Steel: Guitars, Main Vocal
- John Holliday: Guitars, Harmonica, Backing Vocals
- Johnnie Christo: Bass, Backing Vocals
- Milan Zekavica: Drums, Percussion

=== Additional personnel ===
- Steve Pigott, John Carin, Alan Clark: Keyboards, Synthesizers
- Andy Duncan, Steve Scales: Percussion
- Ben Parks, Brian Brumitt, Dave Plews, Jim Patterson: Horns
- "Plum", Tessa Niles: Backing Vocals
