= Dollars and Sex =

Studio album by The Escape Club
- Released: March 26, 1991
- Recorded: 1990
- Genre: Alternative rock
- Label: Atlantic
- Producer: Peter Wolf

The Escape Club chronology
Wild Wild West (1988)	Dollars and Sex (1991)	Celebrity (2012)

Professional ratings
Review scores
Source	Rating
Allmusic	3/5 stars

Dollars and Sex is the third album by rock band The Escape Club, released in 1991. It includes the singles, "Call It Poison" and "I'll Be There" – the latter of which reached no. 8 on the Billboard Hot 100.

== Track listing ==
1. "The Edge of Your Bed"
2. "Call It Poison"
3. "So Fashionable"
4. "I'll Be There"
5. "Shout the Walls Down"
6. "This City"
7. "Blast off to Heaven"
8. "Freedom"
9. "Sugar Man"
10. "Come Alive"
