= Stack Is the New Black =

Studio album by Short Stack
- Released: 14 August 2009
- Recorded: 2008
- Genre: Pop punk, alternative rock, emo
- Length: 48:21
- Label: Sunday Morning Records
- Producer: Shaun Diviney, Trevor Steel

Short Stack chronology
One Size Fits All (2005)	Stack Is the New Black (2009)	This Is Bat Country (2010)

Singles from Stack Is the New Black
- 1. "Shimmy a Go Go" Released: 27 September 2008; 2. "Princess" Released: 27 February 2009; 3. "Sway, Sway Baby!" Released: 17 July 2009

Stack Is the New Black is the debut studio album by Australian pop punk band Short Stack, released through Sunday Morning Records on 14 August 2009. It peaked at number 1 on the ARIA Charts and was certified gold in Australia in 2011.

The album was released on vinyl for the first time in July 2023.

== Release ==
The album's track listing was announced on 12 June 2009 through the band's website. The same day the album was also made available for pre-order, with all pre-orders before 17 July receiving a personal phone call from the band, and their name printed in the album's booklet. JB Hi-Fi online also offered a pre-order of a signed album with a free shirt, guitar picks, poster and stickers.

Both songs "The Back of My Head" and "Thick as Thieves" were both written in the band's early years. They were remade for the album, "Thick as Thieves" was previously named "We Breakdance, Not Hearts". It sounded very similar to "Thick as Thieves". Originally, "The Back of My Head" had Andy Clemmensen and Shaun Diviney singing in the chorus and just Andy singing the verses, but this was changed so that Andy sung the verses and Shaun sung the choruses. (Normally, Andy is the backing vocalist and Shaun in the lead vocalist, except on this song.)

Professional ratings
Review scores
Source	Rating
Allmusic	2/5 stars
The Australian	3/5 stars
The Mercury	3/5 stars

== Track listing ==
All tracks are written by Shaun Diviney.

No.	Title	Length
1.	"Ladies & Gentlemen"	3:27
2.	"Princess"	3:18
3.	"Shimmy a Go Go"	4:04
4.	"Sway, Sway Baby!"	2:50
5.	"In This Place"	3:30
6.	"Drop Dead Gorgeous"	2:53
7.	"Counting the Stars"	3:25
8.	"Before Angels Fall"	3:12
9.	"The Back of My Head"	4:02
10.	"One Step Closer"	3:28
11.	"It's4U"	3:01
12.	"17"	4:13
13.	"We All Know" (produced by Short Stack)	3:26
14.	"Thick as Thieves" (produced by Short Stack)	5:17
15.	"Darling, I'll Be Your Werewolf" (acoustic bonus track; recorded in 2007)	3:47

== Charts ==
=== Weekly charts ===
Chart (2009)	Peak position
Australian Albums (ARIA)	1

=== Year-end charts ===
Chart (2009)	Position
Australian Artists Albums Chart	31

== Certification ==
Region	Certification	Certified units/sales
Australia (ARIA)	Gold	35,000^{^}
^{^} Shipments figures based on certification alone.

== See also ==
- List of number-one albums of 2009 (Australia)
