= Shimmy a Go Go =

Single by Short Stack

from the album Stack Is the New Black
- Released: September 2008
- Length: 4:03
- Label: Sunday Morning Records
- Songwriter: Shaun Diviney
- Producers: Craig Porteils, Trevor Steel

Short Stack singles chronology
"Shimmy a Go Go" (2008)	"Princess" (2009)

"Shimmy a Go Go" is song by Australian pop punk band, Short Stack, released September 2008 as their debut and lead single from their debut studio album, Stack Is the New Black. "Shimmy a Go Go" peaked at #31 on the ARIA Singles Chart. Shaun Diviney stated in a radio interview that he wrote the song during his final year in high school and it is about partying and having a good time.

== Track listings ==
iTunes single
No.	Title	Length
1.	"Shimmy a Go Go"	4:03
2.	"Shimmy a Go Go" (live)	4:01

CD single (SMR001)
No.	Title	Length
1.	"Shimmy a Go Go" (album version)	4:11
2.	"Drop Dead Gorgeous"	2:55
3.	"Shimmy a Go Go" (Louie Love Club mix)	4:49
4.	"Thick As Thieves"	4:00
5.	"Drop Dead Gorgeous" (Enhanced Video)

== Charts ==
Chart (2008)	Peak position
Australia (ARIA)	31

== Personnel ==
Short Stack

- Shaun Diviney – guitar, vocals
- Andy Clemmensen – bass guitar, vocals
- Bradie Webb – drums, keyboards
