= The Escape Club =

English pop rock band

- The Escape Club, 1991

Background information
- Origin: London, England
- Genres: Pop rock
- Years active: 1983–1992, 2009–present
- Labels: EMI, Atlantic Records
- Members: Trevor Steel; John Holliday
- Past members: Milan Zekavica; Mike Woodsum; Red Broad; Johnnie Christo

The Escape Club are an English pop rock band that was formed in London in 1983. They are best known for their 1988 No. 1 US hit "Wild, Wild West" and for their top-ten 1991 hit "I'll Be There".

== History ==
The band formed in 1983, comprising Mad Shadows members lead singer/rhythm guitarist Trevor Steel and guitarist John Holliday, along with former Expressos members bassist Johnnie Christo (a.k.a. John Christoforou) and drummer Milan Zekavica. The seeds for the formation of The Escape Club were sown when Zekavica joined Steel and Holliday in Mad Shadows, who subsequently performed on an album by the obscure early 1980s Stephen Milford-fronted new wave outfit Planning by Numbers. Before long, Christo had also joined the lineup, and The Escape Club was born. The fledgling band quickly released the single "Breathing".

In 1985 The Escape Club signed with EMI and recorded the album White Fields, which was released the following year. In 1987, the group moved to Atlantic Records and began recording their next album, Wild Wild West. The album was released in the summer of 1988 and spawned the single "Wild, Wild West", which climbed to No. 1 on the Billboard Hot 100 chart while the song's video received major rotation on MTV. However, it was banned from British Television for unclear reasons, reports and band members speculate it was due to the use of disembodied limbs and lingerie in a way that came off as offensive or sexist. One reviewer said of the ban and disembodied limbs, "British censors would’ve been acting in the public interest. [...] It’s [a] pretty easy psychedelic trick-shot, and it’s also pure nightmare fuel. I hate looking at it."

In 1989, they released two more singles from Wild Wild West: "Shake for the Sheik", which climbed to No. 28, and "Walking Through Walls", which peaked at No. 81. The Escape Club's cover single of The Doors' "20th Century Fox" appeared on The Wonder Years: Music From the Emmy Award-Winning Show & Its Era, which also received airplay on MTV. The song was produced by Doors band member Ray Manzarek.

In 1990 the band returned to the studio to record their final album, Dollars and Sex, which saw a March 1991 release. The first single, "Call It Poison", failed to crack the US Top 40. Atlantic Records then released the song "I'll Be There", which the group said was heavily influenced by the death of a friend's wife. "I'll Be There" reached No. 8 on the Billboard Hot 100 and achieved gold status in the US. The group disbanded in 1992. The Escape Club is the only British band to have a No. 1 hit in the U.S. while not charting at all in their native UK.

The band self-released a fourth album "Cloud 10" in 2005.

Trevor Steel and John Holliday reunited, with new band member Red Broad, in 2009 and self-released a fifth studio album, Celebrity, in February 2012.

In 2019, Johnnie Christo returned to the line-up and the Escape Club played as a full band for the first time in 25 years during the U.S. tour Lost 80s Live.

On 16 January 2024, drummer Red Broad died, and was buried in the Netherlands. On 9 July 2024, bassist Johnnie Christo died after battling cancer for six years.

== Discography ==
=== Studio albums ===
Year	Album details	Peak chart positions		Certifications (sales threshold)
Year	Album details	US	AUS	Certifications (sales threshold)
1986	White Fields: Released: 1986; Label: EMI America	—	—	
1988	Wild Wild West: Released: 1988; Label: Atlantic Records	27	42	US: Gold
1991	Dollars and Sex: Released: 1991; Label: Atlantic Records	145	—	
2005	Cloud 10: Released: 20 September 2005; Label: self-released	—	—	
2012	Celebrity: Released: 7 February 2012; Label: self-released	—	—	
"—" denotes releases that did not chart

=== Charting singles ===
Year	Single	Peak chart positions					Certifications (sales threshold)	Album
Year	Single	US	US Mod	US Dan	AUS	NZ	Certifications (sales threshold)	Album
1988	"Wild, Wild West"	1	3	36	6	12	US: Gold	Wild Wild West
1988	"Shake for the Sheik"	28	—	—	114	46		Wild Wild West
1989	"Walking Through Walls"	81	—	—	—	—		Wild Wild West
1991	"Call It Poison"	44	—	—	82	—		Dollars & Sex
1991	"I'll Be There"	8	—	—	43	42		Dollars & Sex
1991	"So Fashionable"	—	—	—	—	—		Dollars & Sex
"—" denotes releases that did not chart
