= Planets (song) =

Single by Short Stack
- Released: 24 September 2010
- Recorded: 2010
- Genre: Pop punk, alternative rock
- Length: 3:33
- Label: Sunday Morning
- Songwriter(s): Short Stack
- Producer(s): Essex Boys and Bradie Webb

Short Stack singles chronology
"Sweet December" (2009)	"Planets" (2010)	"We Dance to a Different Disco, Honey" (2010)

"Planets" is a song by Australian pop punk band, Short Stack. It was released on 24 September 2010. as the second single from the band's second studio album, This Is Bat Country. "Planets" debuted at number 4 on the ARIA Charts and was certified platinum in Australia in 2011.

To coincide with the release, Short Stack performed the song live at Federation Square in Melbourne. The event was televised live on Sunrise.

== Music video ==
The music video for "Planets" was spread between two songs, "Planets" and "We Dance to a Different Disco, Honey." The video features the band in a fancy club with people wearing masks, and the members taking the masks off to reveal their identity, also with scenes of a lady torturing another lady by licking her. At the end of the video the lady being tortured reveals that something is hidden at the place that the band is at. Guitarist/Vocalist Shaun Diviney eventually takes off a statue's mask, revealing a white lady with no mouth. Security guards then block Diviney and the lady's path and captures them. The story is then continued in "We Dance to a Different Disco, Honey." There are also scenes of Short Stack playing a in a large room with flashing purple lights.

== Track listing ==
All tracks are written by Short Stack

CD single (SMR0017)
No.	Title	Length
1.	"Planets"	3:33
2.	"I Will, I Will, I Will"	3:41
3.	"Electric Romantics"	3:49
4.	"In My Hands"	4:35
5.	"Planets" (video)	4:32

== Charts ==
=== Weekly charts ===
Chart (2010)	Peak position
Australia (ARIA)	4

=== Year-end charts ===
Chart (2010)	Position
Australia (ARIA)	78
Australian Artists (ARIA)	45
Chart (2011)	Position
Australian Artists (ARIA)	36

== Certification ==
Region	Certification	Certified units/sales
Australia (ARIA)	Platinum	70,000^{^}
^{^} Shipments figures based on certification alone.

== Personnel ==
Short Stack

- Shaun Diviney – guitar, vocals
- Andy Clemmensen – bass guitar, vocals
- Bradie Webb – drums, keyboard
