= Wild, Wild West (The Escape Club song) =

1988 single by the Escape Club

Single by the Escape Club

from the album Wild Wild West
- B-side: "We Can Run"
- Released: 15 July 1988
- Studio: Maison Rouge, Air London, Westside (London, England)
- Genre: Dance-rock; pop rock
- Length: 5:44 (LP version); 3:59 (single edit)
- Label: WEA; Atlantic
- Songwriter: The Escape Club
- Producer: Chris Kimsey

The Escape Club singles chronology
"Wild, Wild West" (1988)	"Shake for the Sheik" (1988)

Music video
- "Wild, Wild West" on YouTube

"Wild, Wild West" is a song by British pop rock band the Escape Club from their debut studio album, Wild Wild West (1988). The single reached No. 1 on the US Billboard Hot 100 the week of 12 November 1988, making the Escape Club the only British artist to have a No. 1 hit in the United States while never charting in the UK.

== Background ==
Lead singer Trevor Steel said:

John had heard a Run-DMC track on the TV the previous night and rushed upstairs to put a hip-hop drum beat onto his drum machine. The journey to the drum machine doubled the speed though and when I came round to see him the next morning and started singing over it, it turned into "Wild, Wild West". I think we wrote that song in the space of two hours. It was originally going to be three minutes long and the extended section with the rap was only meant for the 12" single. We loved it so much full length though that we put the whole thing out.

== Lyrics and music ==
The lyrics, with phrases such as "I love her eyes and her wild, wild hair", "heading for the '90s, living in the wild, wild west", are augmented with gunshot, laser and blaster (a la Star Wars) sound effects. Critics have noted that, due to the distinct drum beat and vocal patterns during the verses, portions of the song bear a strong similarity to Elvis Costello's "Pump It Up". On the lyrical content, singer Trevor Steel said, "I guess it was just a reflection of the times, living in the '80s with all the yuppies getting rich quick and living under the fear of the Cold War and AIDS. The "Ronnie" in the song was a reference to Ronald Reagan."

== Music video ==
The music video was banned from British television for unclear reasons. The Florida Sun Sentinel claimed it was due to sexism. At the time, band members speculated it was due to the use of disembodied limbs through special effect. They also defended the video, saying the sexism was "designed to make fun of the more overtly sexist promo videos of the era." When asked in a 2012 interview, lead singer Trevor Steel responded, "I can't remember why the video was banned in the UK, I think some kids got scared looking at the disfigured legs." One recent reviewer said of the ban and disembodied limbs, "British censors would've been acting in the public interest. [...] It's [a] pretty easy psychedelic trick-shot, and it's also pure nightmare fuel. I hate looking at it."

== Track listings ==
7-inch, cassette, and mini-CD single

1. "Wild, Wild West" – 3:59
2. "We Can Run" – 3:40

UK and European 12-inch single

A1. "Wild, Wild West" (dance mix)
B1. "Wild, Wild West" (single edit)
B2. "We Can Run"

US, Canadian, and Australian 12-inch single

A1. "Wild, Wild West" (dance mix) – 7:54
A2. "Wild, Wild West" (single edit) – 3:59
B1. "Wild, Wild West" (Wild, Wild dub club) – 7:20
B2. "We Can Run" – 3:40

== Credits and personnel ==
Credits are lifted from the Wild Wild West liner notes.

Studios

- Recorded at Maison Rouge, Air London, and Westside Studios (London, England)
- Mastered at Sterling Sound (New York City)

Personnel

- The Escape Club – writing
  - Trevor Steel – lead vocals, guitar
  - John Holliday – backing vocals, guitar
  - Johnnie Christo – backing vocals, bass
  - Milan Zekavica – drums, percussion
- Tessa Niles – backing vocals
- Plum – backing vocals
- Steve Pigott – keyboards
- Jon Carin – keyboards
- Alan Clark – keyboards
- Andy Duncan – percussion
- Steve Scales – percussion
- Jim Patterson – horns
- Dave Plews – horns
- Brian Brummitt – horns
- Ben Parks – horns
- Chris Kimsey – production
- John Luongo – mixing
- Christopher Marc Potter – engineering
- Gary Hellman – engineering
- George Marino – mastering

== Charts ==
=== Weekly charts ===
Chart (1988)	Peak position
Australia (ARIA)	6
Canada Top Singles (RPM)	2
Canada Dance/Urban (RPM)	1
New Zealand (Recorded Music NZ)	12
US Billboard Hot 100	1
US 12-inch Singles Sales (Billboard)	10
US Album Rock Tracks (Billboard)	45
US Dance Club Play (Billboard)	36
US Modern Rock Tracks (Billboard)	3

=== Year-end charts ===
Chart (1988)	Position
Canada Top Singles (RPM)	31
Canada Dance/Urban (RPM)	2
US Billboard Hot 100	18

== Certifications ==
Region	Certification	Certified units/sales
United States (RIAA)	Gold	500,000^{^}
^{^} Shipments figures based on certification alone.

== Release history ==
Region	Date	Format(s)	Label(s)	Ref.
United States	15 July 1988	7-inch vinyl; 12-inch vinyl; cassette	Atlantic	
United Kingdom	30 August 1988	7-inch vinyl; 12-inch vinyl	WEA	
Japan	10 December 1988	Mini-CD	WEA	
