= This Is Bat Country =

Studio album by Short Stack
- Released: 12 November 2010
- Recorded: 2009–2010
- Genre: Alternative rock, pop punk
- Label: Sunday Morning Records; Mercury

Short Stack chronology
Stack Is the New Black (2009)	This Is Bat Country (2010)	Art Vandelay (2013)

Singles from This Is Bat Country
- 1. "Sweet December" Released: 11 December 2009; 2. "Planets" Released: 24 September 2010; 3. "We Dance to a Different Disco, Honey" Released: 24 October 2010; 4. "Heartbreak Made Me a Killer" Released: 25 March 2011

Professional ratings
Review scores
Source	Rating
Allmusic	3/5 stars
The Border Mail	3.5/5 stars
The Music Network	(favorable)

This Is Bat Country is the second official studio album by Australian pop punk band Short Stack, released through Sunday Morning Records on 12 November 2010. The band claims that the sound of their new music (which is a more rock sound) is not a change, but merely a progression from a more pop sound. The album peaked at number 6 on the ARIA charts and was certified gold.

== Track listing ==
All tracks are written by Short Stack

No.	Title	Length
1.	"Bat Country"	4:49
2.	"The Cross"	0:34
3.	"Planets"	3:31
4.	"Are You Afraid of the Dark"	4:18
5.	"Werewolves" (Previously released titled "Darling, I'll Be Your Werewolf")	4:02
6.	"The Cannons"	0:16
7.	"We Dance to a Different Disco, Honey"	3:21
8.	"The Mercury"	1:04
9.	"Heartbreak Made Me a Killer"	3:43
10.	"Wendy"	3:55
11.	"Sweet December"	3:54
12.	"Ruby Red"	3:57
13.	"The Thunder"	0:22
14.	"Jack the Ripper"	3:02
15.	"Sweet Emergency"	1:09
16.	"Die Young Stay Pretty" (Additional lyrics by Shaun Jennings)	3:28
17.	"Nothing at All"	5:14
18.	"Are You Afraid of the Dark" (Bradie Remix; iTunes edition)	4:00

== Charts ==
=== Weekly charts ===
Chart (2010/11)	Peak position
Australian Albums (ARIA)	6

=== Year-end charts ===
Chart (2010)	Position
Australia Albums Chart	88
Australian Artists Albums Chart	23

== Certification ==
Region	Certification	Certified units/sales
Australia (ARIA)	Gold	35,000^{^}
^{^} Shipments figures based on certification alone.
