= MTV Video Music Awards =

American music video awards (1984–present)

- Current: 2026 MTV Video Music Awards; September 27, 2026
- The 1983–1984 Video of the Year "Moonman" award
- Awarded for: Music videos and pop culture
- Country: United States
- Presented by: MTV
- First award: September 14, 1984; 42 years ago
- Website: MTV VMA

Television/radio coverage
- Networks
- MTV (1984–present); CBS (2025–present); The CW (2020–24); (See individual ceremony articles for other simulcast partners)

Most recent MTV Video Music Award winners
- September 27, 2026
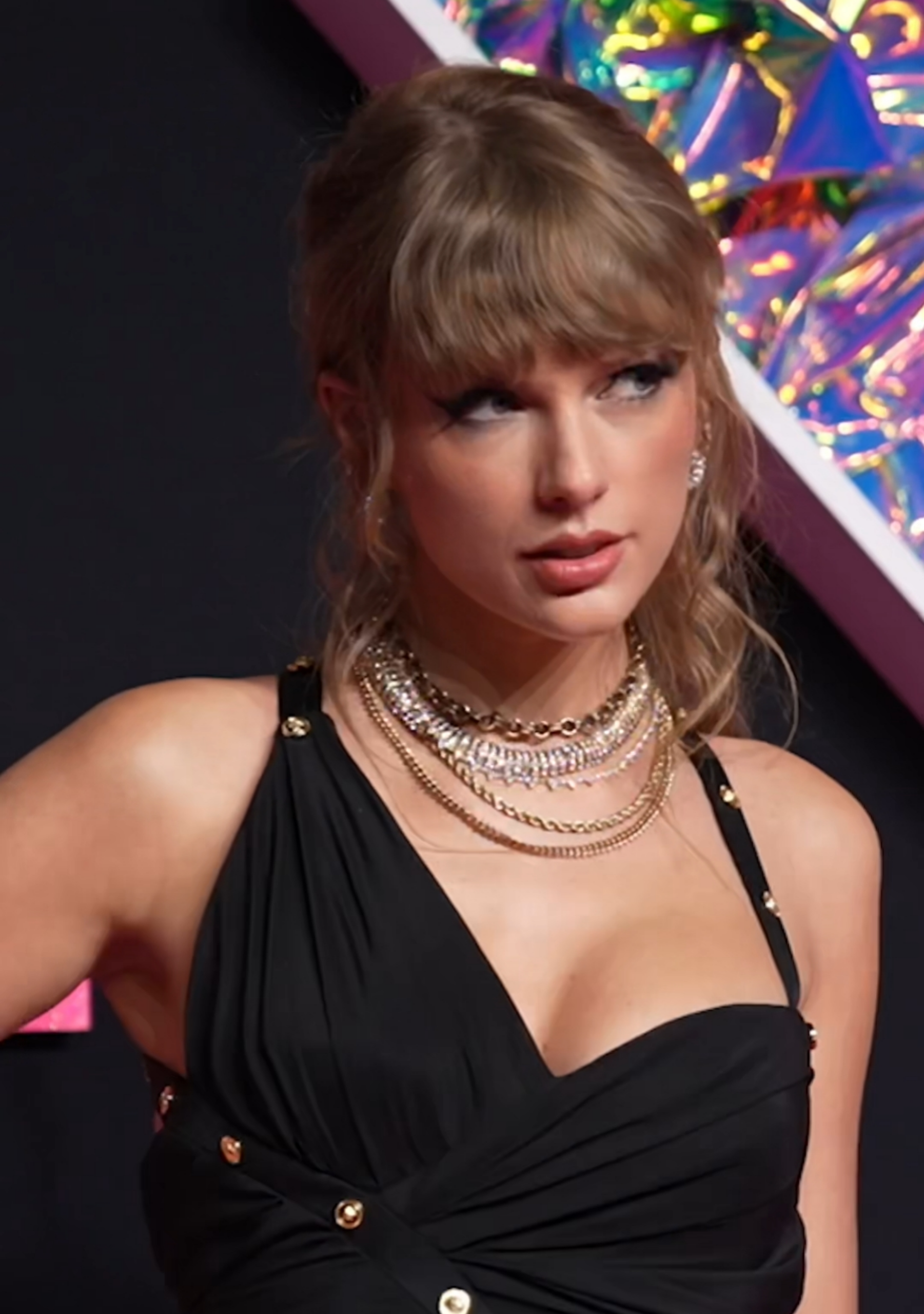

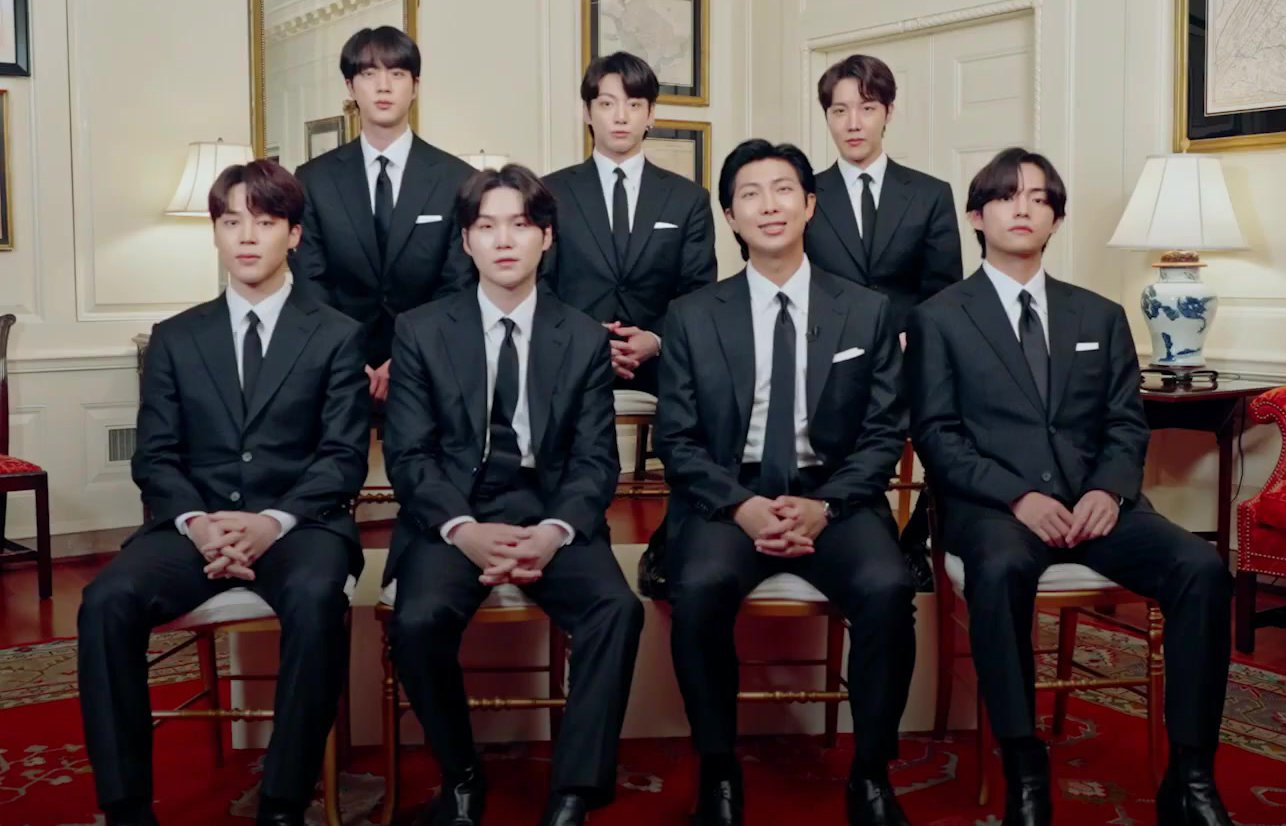

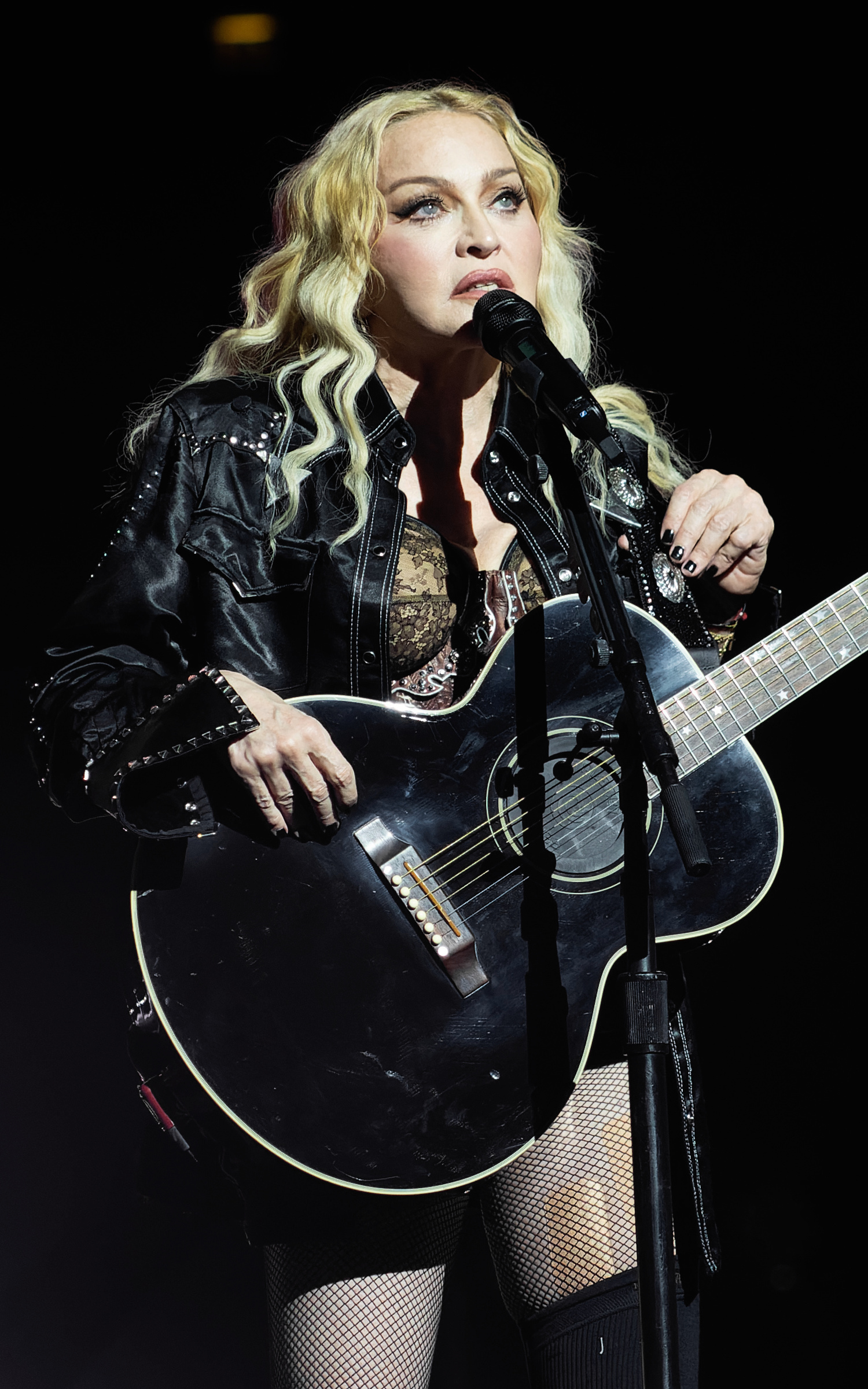

Award	Video of the Year	Song of the Year
Winner	Taylor Swift ("The Fate of Ophelia")	BTS ("Swim")
Award	Artist of the Year	Best New Artist
Winner	Madonna	Sienna Spiro
Previous Video of the Year
Brighter Days Ahead
Video of the Year
"The Fate of Ophelia"

The MTV Video Music Awards, commonly abbreviated as VMAs, is an award show presented by MTV to honor the best in the music video medium. The ceremony has often been called the Super Bowl for youth, an acknowledgment of the VMA ceremony's ability to draw millions of youth from teens to 20-somethings each year. By 2001, the VMA had become a coveted award.

The annual VMA ceremony occurs before the end of summer and held either in late August or mid-September, and broadcast live on CBS. The first VMA ceremony was held in 1984 at New York City's Radio City Music Hall. The ceremonies are normally held in either New York City or Los Angeles. However, the ceremonies have also been hosted in Miami, Las Vegas, Newark, New Jersey, and more recently, in Elmont, New York, on Long Island.

The statue given to winners is an astronaut on the Moon, one of the earliest representations of MTV, and was colloquially called a "moonman", though it has been called a "moon person" by MTV since the 2017 ceremony. The statue was conceived by Manhattan Design, who were also designers of the original MTV logo, based on the network's debut network identification animation utilizing Apollo 11 mission footage, created by Fred Seibert and produced by Alan Goodman and Buzz Potamkin at Buzzco Associates. The statue is now made by Society Awards, a New York City-based firm. Since the 2006 ceremony, viewers are able to vote for their favorite videos in all general categories.

With 85 nominations, Beyoncé holds the record as the most-nominated artist in VMAs history. She is followed by Madonna with 82, who also shares with Lady Gaga the record for the most nominations in a single ceremony (13), in 2026 and 2010, respectively. Taylor Swift is the most-awarded artist, having won 33 trophies between 2009 and 2026, which includes a record-breaking six Video of the Year wins ("Bad Blood", "You Need to Calm Down", All Too Well: The Short Film, "Anti-Hero", "Fortnight", and "The Fate of Ophelia"). On September 21, 2026, Swift was announced as the inaugural recipient of the Artist Director Honors, recognizing her work in music video direction.

== Notable moments ==
=== 1980s ===
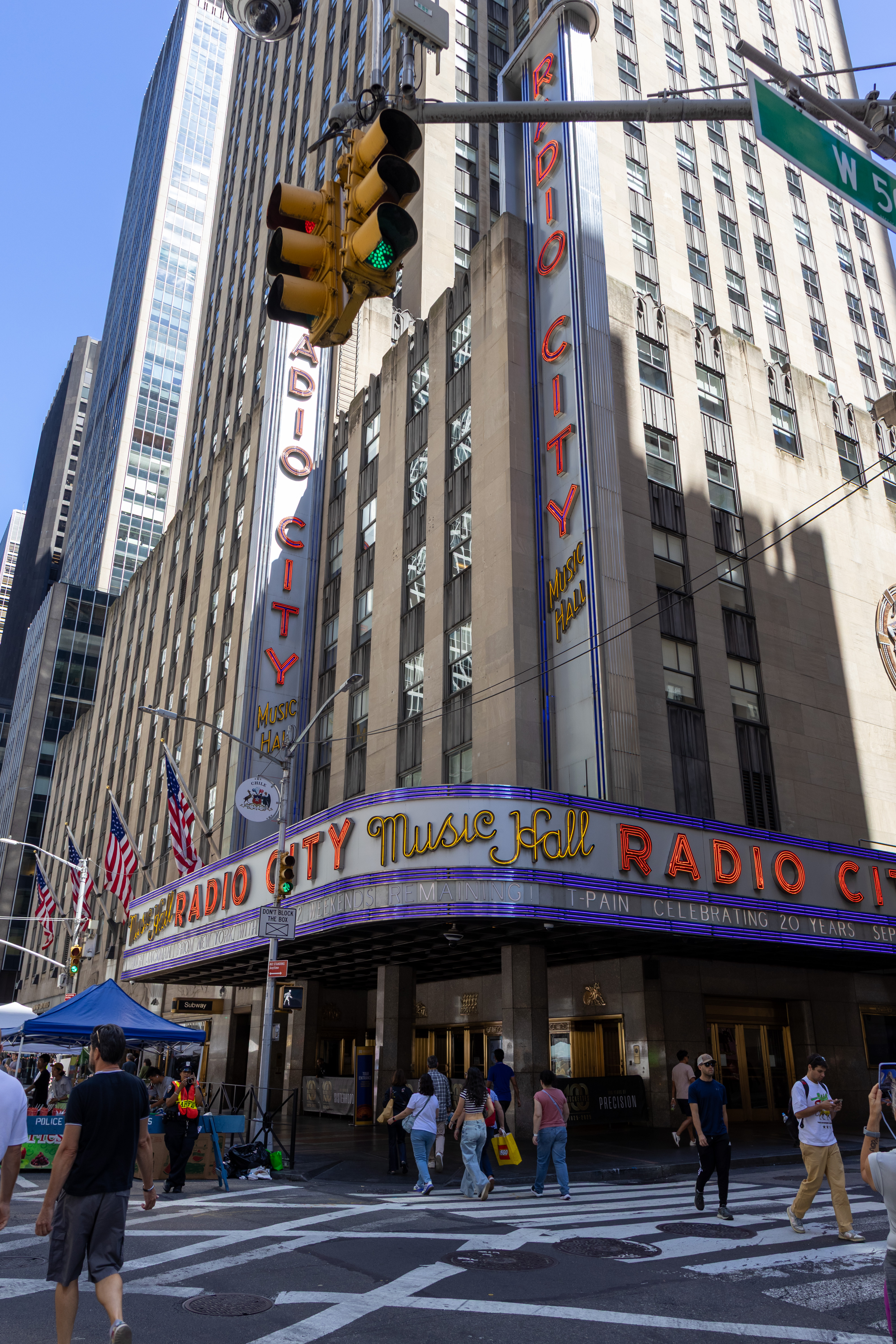
Radio City Music Hall, site of 12 VMAs, including the first

1984: at the first MTV Video Music Awards in 1984, Madonna performed her hit "Like a Virgin" wearing a combination bustier/wedding gown, including her trademark "Boy Toy" belt. During the performance, she rolled around on the floor, revealing lace stockings and a garter. Cyndi Lauper spoke in "Exorcist-esque gibberish" to explain the VMA rules right before winning the Best Female video for "Girls Just Want to Have Fun". David Bowie, the Beatles and director Richard Lester were rewarded with the first ever Video Vanguard Awards for their work in pioneering the music video. The Cars' "You Might Think" won the very first video of the year, beating out Michael Jackson's "Thriller" and Herbie Hancock's "Rockit".

1987: At the 1987 MTV Video Music Awards, Peter Gabriel won ten awards, including the Video Vanguard Award and Video of the Year for his video "Sledgehammer", holding the VMA record for most Moonmen in a single night.

1988: At the 1988 MTV Video Music Awards, Michael Jackson appeared for the first time. A pre-recorded live performance of Bad was shown." He was also awarded the Video Vanguard Award, which was later renamed in his honor.

1989: Comedian Andrew Dice Clay appeared at the 1989 Video Music Awards to promote his new movie, The Adventures of Ford Fairlane, earning a "lifetime ban" from the network when he introduced Cher with some of his recently notorious nursery rhymes that contained vulgar language and references. After performing with Tom Petty, Guns N' Roses guitarist Izzy Stradlin was assaulted by Mötley Crüe lead singer Vince Neil, leading to a verbal battle between Neil and Guns N' Roses lead singer Axl Rose.

Jon Bon Jovi and Richie Sambora turned out a stripped-down acoustic performance of the Bon Jovi hits "Livin' on a Prayer" and "Wanted Dead or Alive", and in the process possibly provided the inspirational spark for MTV Unplugged. While the showrunners have stated that it was already in development by the time of the event, they've also credited the pair's performance with influencing the show to go from initially being meant only for "young, up-and-coming artists" into being a simplified showcase for the "big, stadium, electric-arena-type acts".

Paula Abdul was nominated for six awards, picking up four wins. She performed a seven-minute medley of her singles "Straight Up", "Cold Hearted", and "Forever Your Girl".

When Madonna won the Viewer's Choice Award (sponsored by Pepsi-Cola) for her "Like a Prayer" video, she thanked Pepsi-Cola in her acceptance speech "for causing so much controversy". Pepsi-Cola had paid Madonna $5 million to appear in a commercial that would predominantly feature the world premiere of "Like a Prayer"; the commercial, titled "Make a Wish", depicted Madonna drinking Pepsi and watching a home video of her eighth birthday. The tone that the commercial sought to convey sharply contrasted with the music video. When Pepsi executives saw the video, they yanked the advertisement after only two airings, in an attempt to dissociate themselves from Madonna. She also gave one of the most memorable performances of her hit "Express Yourself", as a preview of what would become her Blond Ambition World Tour.

=== 1990s ===
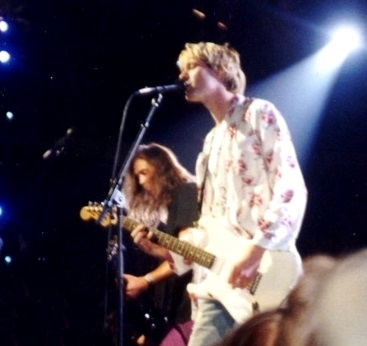
Nirvana performing at the 1992 MTV Video Music Awards

1990: at the 1990 MTV Video Music Awards, Madonna performed her single "Vogue", which featured Madonna and her backup dancers dressed in an 18th-century French theme, with Madonna bearing great resemblance to Marie Antoinette. The performance consisted of both a dramatic historical reinterpretation of "Vogue" as well as her dramatically becorseted breasts.

Janet Jackson, became the youngest recipient of the Video Vanguard Award at 24 years old.

1991: during the award show the MTV Video Vanguard Award was renamed to the Michael Jackson Video Vanguard Award from then on, in honor of his contributions to the culture of music videos by changing them from a promotional tool featuring musicians playing instruments and singing, to a "short film" with a storyline.

A conflict between Poison's Bret Michaels and C.C. DeVille culminated in a fistfight at the 1991 MTV Video Music Awards. DeVille was fired and replaced by Pennsylvanian guitarist Richie Kotzen. Paul Reubens had his first public appearance, during the opening montage, following an arrest for lewd-conduct earlier that year. Taking the stage in costume as Pee-wee Herman, he received a standing ovation, after which he asked the audience, "Heard any good jokes lately?". After his appearance, Van Halen made their television debut, performing "Poundcake". Metallica was another highlight of the performances with "Enter Sandman".

Prince and The New Power Generation performed their song "Gett Off" on a Caligula-esque set, with Prince dressed in a yellow mesh outfit which exposed his buttocks. His trousers were parodied numerous times throughout the following year, on the sketch comedy TV series In Living Color, and even at the following year's VMAs by radio shock jock Howard Stern. It also marked the final TV appearance of Kiss with Eric Carr prior to Carr's death in November 1991.

1992: in the 1992 show, MTV requested Nirvana perform "Smells Like Teen Spirit", while the band itself had indicated it preferred to play new songs "Rape Me" and "tourette's". Network executives continued to push for "Teen Spirit" but finally offered the band a choice to play either "Teen Spirit" or "Lithium", which the band appeared to accept. At the performance, Nirvana began to play, and Kurt Cobain played the first few chords of the song, "Rape Me", much to the horror of MTV execs, before continuing their regular performance of "Lithium". Near the end of the song, frustrated that his amplifier had stopped functioning, bassist Krist Novoselic decided to toss his bass into the air for dramatic effect. He misjudged the landing, and the bass ended up bouncing off of his forehead, forcing him to stumble off the stage in a daze.

Backstage and before the show, Guns N' Roses vocalist Axl Rose challenged Cobain to a fight after he, his wife, Hole lead singer Courtney Love, and Nirvana bandmates Krist Novoselic and Dave Grohl egged him on. At the end of Nirvana's performance, while Cobain was trashing the band's equipment, Dave Grohl ran to the microphone and shouted "Hi, Axl! Where's Axl?" repeatedly. Guns N' Roses' video for the ballad "November Rain" won the MTV Video Music Award for best cinematography. During the show, the band performed "November Rain" with singer Elton John. Because of the dispute Rose had with Cobain, moments before the "November Rain" performance, Cobain spat on the keys of what he thought was Axl's piano. Cobain later revealed that he was shocked to see Elton John play on the piano he had spat on. During the commercial break, the Alien 3 Pepsi commercial was shown.

Radio host Howard Stern appeared as Fartman, Stern's radio superhero, wearing a buttocks-exposing costume obviously inspired by Prince's outfit from the previous year. Stern was a presenter for best hard rock/metal performance with actor Luke Perry (after several other celebrities turned him down).

1993: at the 1993 MTV Video Music Awards, Madonna opened the show in a gender-bending performance of her song "Bye Bye Baby", in which Madonna and her two backup singers, dressed in tuxedos and top hats, danced with women in corsets in a choreographed, highly sexual routine.

RuPaul and Milton Berle, who had conflicts backstage, presented an award together. When Berle touched RuPaul's breasts, RuPaul ad-libbed the line "So you used to wear gowns, but now you're wearing diapers."

Rapper Snoop Dogg presented the Best R&B Video award with Dr. Dre and George Clinton. At the time, Snoop was wanted in connection with the week-old drive-by murder of an L.A. gang member.

Janet Jackson closed the show with her performance of "That's the Way Love Goes" & "If".

1994: at the 1994 MTV Video Music Awards on September 8, months after a profanity-laced appearance on the Late Show with David Letterman, Madonna was announced to present the award for Best Video of the Year. She came out, arm-in-arm with an unannounced David Letterman, to a wild ovation. At the microphone, Letterman told her "I'll be in the car. Watch your language", and left.

Recently betrothed couple Michael Jackson and Lisa Marie Presley received a standing ovation as they walked on stage hand-in-hand. After turning to the audience and proclaiming, "And just think, nobody thought this would last", Jackson grabbed Presley and kissed her.

1995: at the 1995 MTV Video Music Awards, Hole perform the song "Violet" from their major-label debut album Live Through This. This was one of the first major televised performances given by frontwoman Courtney Love following the death of her husband Kurt Cobain and the death of her band's bassist Kristen Pfaff in 1994. Before beginning the song, Love dedicated the performance to her husband and different people in the entertainment industry who had recently died: "This is for Kurt, and Kristen, and River, and Joe, and today Joni Abbott, this is for you." Abbott worked in the Talent Relations department at MTV and had recently committed suicide. The song ended with Love throwing her guitar, knocking the microphone stand into the crowd and pushing over speaker-boxes with bandmate Eric Erlandson before exiting the stage. Love also caused a stir when she interrupted a post-ceremony interview with Kurt Loder and Madonna by throwing her make-up compacts at the singer as they broadcast outside the awards venue.

Michael Jackson performed for over 15 minutes to a medley of his main songs, including "Scream", and danced his signature moves, including the robot, moonwalk and the relatively unknown "Bankhead Bounce". While Slash accompanied Jackson and played guitar on "Black or White and the beginning of Billie Jean". This performance was voted by the public as the Best VMA Pop Performance and Most Iconic VMA Performance in 2011 with more than half the votes.

TLC was the big winner of the night won four awards, including "Viewer's Choice", "Best Group Video", and "Video of the Year" (Waterfalls).

1996: at the 1996 MTV Video Music Awards, the four original members of Van Halen received 20-second standing ovation when they made their first public appearance together since their break-up in 1985.

Several weeks later, the public learned that Van Halen would not reunite with Roth. Roth released a statement apologizing to fans, stating that he was an unwitting participant in a publicity stunt to sell more copies of the greatest hits album, Best Of Vol. 1, and that he had been led to believe that he was rejoining Van Halen. The following day, Eddie and Alex Van Halen released a statement, stating that they had been honest with Roth, and never led him to believe that he had been re-hired.

During British band Oasis' performance at the show, lead vocalist Liam Gallagher made rude gestures at brother Noel as he was playing his guitar solo, then spat beer all over the stage before storming off.

Alanis Morissette performed "Your House", a hidden track from her bestseller album "Jagged Little Pill".

The recently reunited Kiss closed the show with a special concert aired from the Brooklyn Bridge.

Tupac Shakur made his final public appearance before his murder.

1997: at the 1997 MTV Video Music Awards, Pat Smear announced that he was leaving Foo Fighters halfway through their performance and presented his replacement, Franz Stahl, who had been a member of the band Scream with Dave Grohl.

The Spice Girls, who won the best dance video award for their music video "Wannabe", wore a black strap on their left arms as a sign of grief because of Diana, Princess of Wales's death four days prior to the event.

While accepting the MTV Video Music Award for Best New Artist Video that year for "Sleep to Dream", Fiona Apple appealed to her audience not to be enamored of celebrity culture. She proclaimed, "this world is bullshit" and quoted Maya Angelou, saying "go with yourself". Though her comments were generally greeted with cheers and applause at the awards ceremony, the media backlash was huge. Some considered her remarks to be hypocritical, however she was unapologetic: "When I have something to say, I'll say it."

Marilyn Manson performed the song "The Beautiful People", as the grand finale, and the video for this song was nominated for "Best Rock Video" and "Best Special Effects", marking one of the most significant performances for the band.

1998: at the 1998 MTV Video Music Awards, during the original broadcast of the show, a commercial faded in the Nine Inch Nails NIN logo on a black screen while playing a combination of music that started as a solo piano piece and morphed into an electronic/industrial beat (which would later found out to be the songs "La Mer" and "Into the Void", which share many melodic components and can be considered variations on a theme) and ended with Trent Reznor screaming "Tried to save myself, but myself kept slipping away" and the word "ninetynine" in the trademark NIN reversed-N font. This was only shown once during the original broadcast, was edited out of all repeats.

Geri Halliwell attended the event, one of her first public appearances since she left the Spice Girls.

At the red carpet, actress Rose McGowan was wearing a see-through dress, no bra, and a thong, while Mariah Carey and Whitney Houston poked fun at their rumored rift by wearing lookalike chocolate brown dresses by Vera Wang. In an attempt to outdo each other, the singers tore off pieces of their dresses to reveal minidresses then staged a faux catfight that left the audience in disbelief. "People thought Whitney and I had some kind of beef", explained Carey.

1999: Lil' Kim showed up at the 1999 MTV Video Music Awards with an entire breast exposed and only a small pasty over the nipple. Kim's outfit became even more controversial later when she appeared on stage with Diana Ross and Mary J. Blige to present the Best Hip-Hop Video award, and Ross reached over, cupped her hand under Kim's exposed breast and jiggled it while Kim laughed.

During the following acceptance speech by the Beastie Boys, group member Ad-Rock addressed the instances of rape and sexual assault that occurred in the crowd at the recent Woodstock 1999 concert event. He pleaded to other musicians in the room to make a change in the way they treat fans at concerts; to pledge to talk with promoters and security to ensure "the safety of all the girls and the women who come to our shows".

Afeni Shakur and Voletta Wallace, the mothers of the recently deceased Tupac Shakur and The Notorious B.I.G., met for the first time at the ceremony.

Britney Spears made her debut appearance on the show, performing her single "...Baby One More Time" and later introducing NSYNC for "Tearin' Up My Heart".

Ricky Martin took the stage of the ceremony to perform his singles "She's All I Ever Had" and "Livin' la Vida Loca".

TLC won Best Group Video for "No Scrubs", receiving a standing ovation from the audience and artists. For the second year in a row, the Backstreet Boys took the Viewer's Choice Award for "I Want It That Way", a song they performed during the broadcast.

Before presenting the final award, a group of drag queens paid tribute to Madonna wearing her most iconic outfits with a medley of her hit songs. Madonna herself then appeared onstage and remarked, "All I have to say is that it takes a real man to fill my shoes." She then introduced Paul McCartney, who presented the Video of the Year to "some guy called Laurence Hill" (Lauryn Hill).

=== 2000s ===
2000: at the 2000 Video Music Awards, Limp Bizkit won the award for Best Rock Video. As vocalist Fred Durst spoke, Rage Against the Machine bassist Tim Commerford climbed onto the scaffolding of the set. Durst egged Commerford on, saying "Stage dive, dude" and "Take a dive", finally ending his speech with "and [Commerford]'s a pussy 'cause he won't jump". Commerford and his bodyguard were sentenced to a night in jail. RATM vocalist Zack de la Rocha reportedly left the awards after Commerford's stunt. RATM guitarist Tom Morello recalled that Commerford related his plan to the rest of the band before the show, and that both de la Rocha and Morello advised him against it immediately after Bizkit was presented the award.

Eminem performed his two singles "The Real Slim Shady" and "The Way I Am". The performance began with Eminem's single "The Real Slim Shady" which started outside the Radio City Music Hall on 6th Avenue, Manhattan. Eminem continued his performance into the arena and was followed by a hundred Eminem 'clones' wearing white tank tops and baggy jeans with bleached blonde hair.

Napster co-founder Shawn Fanning co-introduced Britney Spears. Fanning wore a Metallica T-shirt, much to the displeasure of Metallica drummer and anti-Napster advocate Lars Ulrich. Britney performed "(I Can't Get No) Satisfaction" and her newest smash hit "Oops!... I Did It Again", which gained media attention mostly due to Spears's ripping off a tuxedo to reveal nude-colored performance attire. At performance's end, VMA co-host Marlon Wayans proclaimed, "Girl done went from 'The Mickey Mouse Club' to the strip club."

At the end of Christina Aguilera's performance, Durst walked onstage and performed part of his band's song "Livin' It Up" with Aguilera. After eliciting charged reactions from his fans, Durst stated: "I already told you guys before, I did it all for the nookie, man." The feud died weeks later. Aguilera denied Durst's statement, saying Durst "got no nookie".

Aguilera and Spears disproved rumors of a rivalry when they came onstage, holding hands, and introduced Whitney Houston. Houston, who had been targeted by the media for erratic behavior, canceled appearances, drug use rumors and being busted for carrying marijuana at a Hawaii airport just a few months prior, came out to a standing ovation and introduced an award to Eminem with husband Bobby Brown, who was recently let out from jail. Houston revealed more erratic behavior, jumping up and down saying "free" in reference to Brown's recent jail release. Aaliyah would win two MTV Video Music Awards for Best Female Video and Best Video from a Film for "Try Again".

2001: at the 2001 Video Music Awards, Britney Spears performed her single, "I'm a Slave 4 U". while dancing in a very revealing outfit, the performance featured the singer in a cage with a tiger and briefly dancing with a real albino snake on her shoulders. The inclusion of a tiger and a snake in the performance bought a great deal of criticism from PETA.

U2 had been set to perform a medley including "Elevation", "Beautiful Day" and "Stuck in a Moment You Can't Get Out Of". The riser they were performing on lost power and MTV had to cut to several minutes of promos while everything was set up again. They lost power again and finally the band was lowered to the ground and performed without the riser. After the performance, lead singer Bono explained that MTV "forgot to pay the electricity bill".

Michael Jackson made a surprise appearance at the end of NSYNC's performance of "Pop". Surrounded by members of the group, Jackson performed some of his trademark dance moves to Justin Timberlake's beatboxing.

The show paid tribute to the R&B singer/actress Aaliyah, who was supposed to present an award but died two weeks before in a plane crash. U2 paid tribute to punk-rock singer Joey Ramone, who died of lymphoma 4 months before.

2002: in 2002, the VMAs took place on Michael Jackson's birthday. Britney Spears introduced Jackson as the "artist of the millennium" and presented him with a birthday cake and a statue. Jackson, believing he won an honor, gave an acceptance speech. In his speech he said, "When I was a little boy growing up in Indiana if someone told me I'd be getting 'the artist of the millennium award,' I'd have never believed it." MTV confirmed no such award existed, and the statue was merely a birthday gift. A year later, at the 2003 VMAs, this was parodied by presenters Fred Durst and Jack Black, with Durst stating that Black was the "funniest man alive".

The Hives and The Vines both performed on the night after the sudden garage rock revival during the year, with rumors spreading around that it was to be 'battle of the bands' performance. Once The Hives performed, singer Howlin' Pelle Almqvist said to the crowd "I know you want us to play more, but that's all the time we have for so you can turn off [your TV] now", just before The Vines came on the bigger stage to perform their hit single "Get Free", ultimately destroying their set after their performance.

Triumph the Insult Comic Dog appeared and had a confrontation with Eminem. Eminem had a confrontation with Moby, who had called the rapper's music misogynistic and homophobic. By that time, there were multiple boos from the crowd. The Best Male Video award was given to Eminem right after the confrontation with Triumph and Moby, and when Eminem went to stage to pick up the award, in the middle of his speech, he challenged Moby to fight if he continued to boo him.

Justin Timberlake made his solo performance debut on the show, performing his single "Like I Love You".

Tionne "T-Boz" Watkins and Rozonda "Chilli" Thomas, the surviving members of the top-selling R&B trio TLC, made their first television appearance since the death of bandmate Lisa "Left Eye" Lopes.

Shakira took the stage of the VMAs to perform her single "Objection (Tango)".

Christina Aguilera shocked the audience by wearing a skimpy outfit and heavy makeup, with a dirty look removing her good-girl image. She was part of an awkward moment at the awards when presenting the Best Male Video Award to Eminem, who had insulted her in 2000.

Canadian artist Avril Lavigne won her first award ever as Best New Artist in a Video, getting the record for the youngest artist so far to win this award at the age of 17. She kicked off the 2002 VMAs with a "Complicated" / "Sk8er Boi" pre-show performance and together with Lisa Marie Presley they gave the award for Best Female Video to Pink who was under the effects of alcohol during her acceptance speech.

Axl Rose unveiled the new lineup of New Guns N' Roses. The band's set was the show's finale, and although the performance was meant to be kept a secret, some New York radio outlets announced the performance earlier in the day. The band played a set consisting of "Welcome to the Jungle", "Madagascar", and "Paradise City".

2003: at the 2003 Video Music Awards, Madonna played a groom kissing her brides, Britney Spears and Christina Aguilera, on stage. The gender role-reversal and lesbian theme instantly made front-page headlines. The three singers performed a medley of her classic hit, "Like a Virgin", and her then latest release, "Hollywood", with a guest rap by Missy Elliott. A quick camera cut to the reaction of Justin Timberlake, who dated Spears until 2002, also gained media attention. The design resembled Madonna's performance of "Like a Virgin" at the 1984 VMAs: the same wedding cake set, wedding dresses and "Boy Toy" belt worn by Madonna 19 years ago now adorned Aguilera and Spears.

Beyoncé opened her performance by descending upside down from the rafters at Radio City Music Hall. Knowles performed "Baby Boy" as she was gently lowered to the stage, dressed in harem pants. She was later joined by Jay-Z as they performed their duet "Crazy in Love". The performance marked Knowles' solo debut.

2004: the 2004 MTV Video Music Awards were held at the American Airlines Arena in Miami, Florida. This was the first time the awards show was held outside of New York City and Los Angeles. It was the first video music awards to not have a host.

2005: at the 2005 show, Green Day returned, taking home the Best Rock Video, Best Group Video, and Video of the Year Moonmen for "Boulevard of Broken Dreams", which they performed during the broadcast. They also took the Viewer's Choice award for "American Idiot".

The 2005 VMAs were the first to have a performance in Spanish, when Shakira performed her single "La Tortura" with Alejandro Sanz. It was also the first time that Spanish-language videos were nominated at the awards.

Also at the show, while introducing the reggaeton spot, Fat Joe made a disparaging comment about G-Unit: "I'd like to tell the people home I feel so safe tonight with all this police protection courtesy of G-Unit...". Later in the show, after G-Unit's performance, 50 Cent directed profanities at Fat Joe which were edited out before the shows airing although some broadcasts played the uncensored version of the show. Reggaeton artists Daddy Yankee, Tego Calderón and Don Omar performed.

Actress Eva Longoria caused a stir when she appeared barely dressed to introduce Mariah Carey. Gwen Stefani and Snoop Dogg won best dressed female and male and received prizes to donate to a charity of their choice.

Kelly Clarkson performed a high energy version of her song "Since U Been Gone" barefoot wearing a graphic belly top and capri pants. Clarkson moved through the crowd during the performance, which culminated in the singer getting sprayed with water. By the end of the song, she and a portion of the audience were soaking wet. R. Kelly performed his rap opera, "Trapped in the Closet".

Animated duo Beavis and Butt-head appeared in several Viewer's Choice award skits, saying to "Vote to put Beavis and Butt-head back on MTV!". Rather belatedly, the TV show returned to MTV in 2011.

2006: Justin Timberlake opened the 2006 Video Music Awards performing his singles "My Love" and "SexyBack". The awards were distributed evenly widespread all genres, as hip-hop, pop and rock artists alike all won Moonmen. 2006 was also the first time that viewers voted for all the performer's categories (Video of the Year, Best Male Video, Best Group Video, among others, except professional categories).

When Panic! at the Disco won Video of the Year for "I Write Sins Not Tragedies", a man calling himself Sixx jumped onstage claiming that MTV had denied him his own TV show. Hosted by Jack Black, there were also performances by Shakira with Wyclef Jean, Beyoncé, Christina Aguilera and The Killers.

2007: the 2007 Video Music Awards was opened by Britney Spears performing her comeback single "Gimme More". To many, Spears failed to live up to the pre-show hype. She wore black sequined lingerie and put in less energy than her previous performances. The performance was called "career crippling".

Kid Rock and Tommy Lee were involved in an altercation during Alicia Keys's performance. Lee was sitting with magician Criss Angel when the two went to visit Diddy, who was sitting close to Kid Rock. Kid Rock allegedly punched Tommy Lee in the face. The two were broken up, and both were escorted from the resort. Angel was removed a short time later.

2008: the 2008 Video Music Awards were opened by Britney Spears which welcomed everybody to the 25-year anniversary of the Video Music Awards. Barbadian singer Rihanna opened the show with her song "Disturbia" in a very revealing black leather outfit. After 16 nominations, Britney Spears finally won her first VMA, taking Best Female Video, Best Pop Video, and Video of the Year for "Piece of Me", considered as Spears' comeback.

Host Russell Brand commented on Democratic presidential nominee Barack Obama, begging the audience to vote for him. Brand called President George W. Bush a "retarded cowboy" and claimed Bush "wouldn't be trusted with a pair of scissors in Britain".

Russell Brand also made comments on the Jonas Brothers for wearing purity rings. Brand later faced criticism for his swipes at the trio. He confirmed his apology at the MTV Video Music Awards 2009 by saying "I upset the Jonas Brothers last year, I had to say sorry to them and they forgave me. They had to, they're Christians." During her introduction of T.I. and Rihanna's performance, Jordin Sparks, who also wears a purity ring, defended the boy-band by saying "It's not bad to wear a promise ring because not everybody, guy or girl, wants to be a slut." Sparks was in turn criticized for implying that those who do not wear purity rings or do not abstain are promiscuous.

Kanye West taking the microphone from Taylor Swift at the 2009 MTV Video Music Awards

2009: at the 2009 Video Music Awards, singer-songwriter Taylor Swift won Best Female video for "You Belong with Me". During her acceptance speech, rapper Kanye West unexpectedly showed up on stage. Taking the microphone from Swift, he announced "Yo Taylor, I'm really happy for you, and Imma let you finish, but Beyoncé had one of the best videos of all time. One of the best videos of all time!". MTV cut away from the stage (showing Beyoncé with a shocked and disapproved look) after West gave the microphone back to Swift and giving the middle finger to the audience as they started booing him off stage, and so Swift did not finish her speech. West was removed for the rest of the show. However, when Beyoncé won Video of the Year for "Single Ladies (Put a Ring on It)", she called Swift back on stage to "have her moment" (finishing her speech from winning Best Female Video). In an off-the-record portion of an interview the following day, President Barack Obama called West a "jackass" for his antics. During a post-interview, Jay-Z admitted West was wrong to go on stage, but he thought people were overreacting to the incident.

Madonna opened the show talking about her experiences with Michael Jackson. After her speech, a Michael Jackson tribute commenced, including Janet Jackson performing the duet "Scream". The show closed with a sneak preview of Michael Jackson's This Is It movie.

At the show's red carpet, Colombian singer Shakira and American singer Pink attended with the same dress. Both singers took it humorously and posed together for the paparazzi.

Lady Gaga later performed her song "Paparazzi" and shocked the audience when she appeared to bleed out on stage. It was actually a contraption in her outfit. Beyoncé performed her song "Single Ladies (Put a Ring on It)" with over two dozen female dancers dancing with her. Pink performed her single "Sober" while doing a trapeze act during the entire performance while singing live.

Rapper Lil Mama jumped on stage as Jay-Z and Alicia Keys performed "Empire State of Mind". Lil Mama later apologized. During an interview with New York Radio DJ Angie Martinez, Jay-Z said that he thought the unrehearsed move was something similar to the West and Swift incident.

Beyoncé, Lady Gaga and Green Day were the big winners of the night, with three awards each.

=== 2010s ===
The standing inflatable KAWS moonman at the 2013 MTV Video Music Awards

2010: at the 2010 MTV Video Music Awards, Taylor Swift performed her song "Innocent", while Kanye West performed "Runaway" with Pusha T giving a stellar performance on the MPC2000. Eminem, who performed at the show, did not receive his awards in person, as he had to leave immediately to perform with Jay Z at The Home & Home Tour in New York City the next day. Additionally, will.i.am's "blackface" outfit sparked controversy among African-Americans. Florence + the Machine performed "Dog Days Are Over".

Lady Gaga won eight awards, including Video of the Year, Best Female Video, and Best Pop Video for "Bad Romance"; she also won Best Collaboration for "Telephone" with Beyoncé. Upon accepting her Video of the Year award, Gaga wore a dress made entirely of raw meat, which drew criticism from PETA. While accepting her Video of the Year award, Lady Gaga announced the title of her next album, Born This Way, and sang the chorus of its title track and lead single. Justin Bieber won Best New Artist, making him the second youngest Canada-born artist to ever win a VMA (first being Avril Lavigne in 2002).

Overall, the show grabbed 11.4 million viewers—the largest audience for an MTV Video Music Awards since 2002, and until 2011's new record.

2011: the 2011 MTV Video Music Awards returned to the Nokia Theatre in Los Angeles, California. In the entire history of the show, this was the third time no host was scheduled, although Kevin Hart, who would receive the position a year later, delivered an opening monologue.

Lady Gaga opened the show dressed as her alter ego Joe Calderone, delivering a monologue and then performing her single "You and I" from her album Born This Way. She was joined on stage by Queen band member and guitarist Brian May.

The tribute to Britney Spears included performances by young talents, who danced to various hit singles by Spears including "...Baby One More Time" and "Till the World Ends". After the tribute, Lady Gaga went onstage to present Spears the Michael Jackson Video Vanguard Award. While accepting her award she and Gaga (dressed as her alter ego Joe Calderone) teased a kiss. Spears rejected the exchange saying, "I've done that already", referring to her liplock with Madonna at the 2003 show.

During Kanye West and Jay Z's surprise performance of "Otis", a man attempted to rush the stage but was quickly taken off by security.

Katy Perry and Kanye West won the Award for Best Video for a Collaborative Single. As they went onstage to receive the award, Perry made a reference to West's incident with Taylor Swift two years back. This was the first award Perry won in four years of being nominated.

Prior to her performance, Beyoncé announced on the red carpet that she and husband/rapper Jay Z were expecting a child. Straight after Beyoncé finished performing her song "Love on Top", she also revealed again that she was pregnant by showing off her baby bump and rubbing it. That evening, Beyoncé set the record for the most mentions on Twitter per second (with 8,868) and helped this year's VMAs become the most-watched broadcast in MTV history, pulling in 12.4 million viewers.

A tribute to late singer Amy Winehouse also took place; Russell Brand delivered a monologue on his thoughts on her, after which Tony Bennett previewed his collaboration with her for his album Duets II. Afterwards, Bruno Mars performed "Valerie" in her honor.

Katy Perry won three awards including Video of the Year for "Firework", and Lady Gaga won two awards, including the new category Best Video With a Message for "Born This Way".

2012: The 2012 MTV Video Music Awards aired live from the Staples Center in Los Angeles, California on September 6, 2012. British boy band One Direction was the big winner of the night receiving Best New Artist, Best Pop Video, and Most Share Worthy Video. Rihanna won the Video of the Year Award for "We Found Love".

2013: For the 2013 MTV Video Music Awards, MTV redesigned its moonman statue for one year only due to the ceremony's being held in Brooklyn for the first time. Brooklyn-based artist KAWS used Michelin Man as inspiration to redesign the image of the renowned MTV moonman. Barclays Center, which served as the venue for the 2013 show, was decorated also by KAWS, themed around the redesigned moonman. The 2013 VMAs also marked the fourth time in the award show's history that a host had not been appointed for the annual event. Lady Gaga opened the ceremony, performing her single "Applause". During the performance, Gaga changed three times on stage and gave a tribute to her past eras (The Fame, The Fame Monster and Born This Way). At the end, Gaga came on stage wearing nothing but a seashell bikini.

Miley Cyrus' performance of her song "We Can't Stop" featured the former Disney star entering the stage through a giant teddy bear wearing a one-piece bodice with a teddy bear design on it. The singer performed with a group of female backup dancers dressed as giant bears before singer Robin Thicke joins with Cyrus on stage to perform his single "Blurred Lines". Cyrus then stripped down to a nude-colored lingerie and proceeded to perform her signature twerking dance moves, simulating sex with Thicke and grabbing his crotch with a giant foam finger. The unimpressed reactions of several celebrity audience members, including Rihanna and members of One Direction, also gained attention in the media.

Justin Timberlake's "Mirrors" won Video of the Year, making him the first male solo artist to win this category since Eminem in 2002 with "Without Me". Timberlake also became the second artist to be honored with the Video Vanguard Award and win Video of the Year in the same night, after Peter Gabriel did it in 1987. To celebrate his Video Vanguard Award, Timberlake performed a 15-minute medley performance, which included a mini-reunion with his former band *NSYNC. The set list of the most watched performance of the night included hit singles from his first four solo albums, such as "Cry Me a River", "SexyBack" and "Suit & Tie".

2014: the 2014 show was held at The Forum in Inglewood, California. Miley Cyrus won Video of the Year for "Wrecking Ball" and got a young homeless man named Jesse to accept the award on her behalf. His speech was a call-to-action to help raise awareness to the homeless youth of America. Ariana Grande, Nicki Minaj and Jessie J opened the show. Beyoncé closed the show by performing a 16-minute medley of songs from her self-titled fifth studio album. After the performance, her husband Jay Z and daughter Blue Ivy presented the Video Vanguard Award to her.

2015: the 2015 show was hosted by Miley Cyrus. Fashion designer Jeremy Scott redesigned the year's "moonman", marking the second time that the statue had been transformed. Taylor Swift won four awards, including Video of the Year for "Bad Blood". She presented the Video Vanguard Award to Kanye West, who ended his acceptance speech by claiming that he would run for president in 2020.

Nicki Minaj ended her acceptance speech for Best Hip-Hop Video by passing the show back to Cyrus, saying: "And now, back to this bitch who had a lot to say about me the other day in the press: Miley, What's good?". Minaj was referring to Cyrus' comments about how she handled "Anaconda" being snubbed for a Video of the Year nomination. Cyrus appeared stunned by Minaj's remarks and replied, "We're all in this industry. We all do interviews and we all know how they manipulate shit. Nicki, congratu-fuckin-lations." The camera then cut back to Minaj who seemed to mouth back the word "bitch". Cyrus closed the show by performing along with a group of drag queens who participated on RuPaul's Drag Race and surprisingly released her fifth studio album Miley Cyrus and Her Dead Petz for free.

2016: the 2016 show was held at the Madison Square Garden in Manhattan. Rihanna performed four times during the show, including opening and closing the ceremony. After her final performance, Rihanna was presented the Video Vanguard Award by Drake, who declared, "She's someone I've been in love with since I was 22 years old." While accepting her award, Drake leaned in for a kiss that Rihanna dodged. Britney Spears returned to perform at the VMAs for the first time since her heavily criticized performance at the 2007 show. Kanye West gave a seven-minute long speech covering different topics, including his feud with Taylor Swift.

Beyoncé performed a 16-minute medley of her album Lemonade and won eight awards, including Video of the Year for "Formation". She became the most awarded artist in VMA history with 24 moonmen, surpassing Madonna's previous record of 20. The telecast saw a drop in audience for third year in a row.

2017: the 2017 show was hosted by Katy Perry. Kendrick Lamar won six awards, including Video of the Year for "Humble", becoming the first artist to have won the award for a video he co-directed, while Pink was honored with the Video Vanguard Award. Jared Leto paid tribute to Chester Bennington and Chris Cornell, who both died over the past three months. The music video for Taylor Swift's song "Look What You Made Me Do" premiered during the broadcast. Compared to the previous year, viewership was down from 6.5 million to 5.4 million viewers, making it the lowest viewed VMAs since Nielsen started measuring the show in 1994.

At the start of Fifth Harmony's performance there were five silhouettes; one of them fell off the stage, referencing former group member Camila Cabello leaving the group the previous year.

Logic performed his song "1-800-273-8255" along with Alessia Cara and Khalid. Their stage was outlined with survivors of suicide loss and attempts, who wore T-shirts that had the phone number on the front and the phrase "You Are Not Alone" written on the back. During their performance, Logic gave a speech about thanking the audience for giving him a platform to talk about the issues "that mainstream media doesn't want to talk about: mental health, anxiety, suicide, depression". He further added, "I don't give a damn if you're black, white, or any color in between. I don't care if you're Christian, you're Muslim, you're gay, you're straight – I am here to fight for your equality, because I believe that we are all born equal, but we are not treated equally and that is why we must fight." Following the performance, the National Suicide Prevention Lifeline experienced a 50% increase in calls.

2018: Cardi B, the most nominated artist of the night, opened the 2018 show with a brief speech, holding a VMA like a baby. While receiving one of her awards, Cardi B stated, "all the love.. it's genuine, it's beautiful, and that's something that God give me that you can't buy. B-tch." Camila Cabello won Video of the Year for "Havana" and Jennifer Lopez received the Vanguard Award. With Maluma among the performers as well, it marked the VMAs with the most Latin music artists present at the ceremony since the 2005 show.

Before introducing Cabello's category, Madonna gave a tribute to the late Aretha Franklin. Most of the speech said the early origins of Madonna's career and was only tangentially Franklin-related, which made critics describe the "bizarre" tribute as a "lengthy" anecdote about herself that involved Franklin's music. Afterwards, Madonna explained that she was there to give the Video of the Year award as asked by MTV and to speak about some experience in her career with some connection with Aretha, not to make any kind of tribute.

The viewership of the 2018 MTV Video Music Awards was down 9% overall and 15% in the important 18- to 49-year-old demographic group. The total viewership was 4.8 million.

2019: the 2019 show was held at the Prudential Center in Newark, New Jersey. This was the first time the VMAs took place at the venue and in the state of New Jersey (it became the fifth state to host the show after New York, California, Florida and Nevada).

The show was hosted by Sebastian Maniscalco. Taylor Swift won three awards, including Video of the Year for "You Need to Calm Down". She became the second artist and first female artist to have won the award for a video she co-directed, and the fourth artist to win the category twice overall. Lil Nas X and Billy Ray Cyrus's "Old Town Road" won two awards, including Song of the Year. Missy Elliott received the Vanguard Award introduced by Cardi B and performed a medley. The performance was heavily choreographed and the set pieces alluded to her music videos "The Rain (Supa Dupa Fly)", "Get Ur Freak On", and "Work It". Shawn Mendes & Camila Cabello performed their hit single "Señorita" for the first time ever in a performance characterized for its kissing tension. Lizzo performed a set featuring her singles, "Truth Hurts" and "Good as Hell". During the performance she gave a short self-empowering monologue, and featured a figurative shadow of an oversized CGI rear end. Normani gave a performance of her song "Motivation", that featured her doing intense gymnastic styled choreography that echoed the music video. Rosalía became the first lead Spanish act to ever perform at the VMAs, performing a medley of "A Ningún Hombre", "Yo x Ti, Tu x Mi" (alongside Ozuna), and "Aute Cuture". She also won Best Latin and Best Choreography for "Con Altura", becoming the first ever Spanish act to win a VMA, for which she was congratulated by many personalities including Prime Minister Pedro Sánchez.

Marc Jacobs received the inaugural MTV Fashion Trailblazer Award.

=== 2020s ===
2020: The 2020 MTV Video Music Awards were held on August 30, 2020. The show was originally scheduled to take place at the Barclays Center in Brooklyn, New York City, but was moved outdoors because of security concerns caused by the COVID-19 pandemic. Instead, the 37th annual ceremony would "highlight the boroughs in an exciting show and return to Barclays Center in 2021". For the first time in its history the VMAs were simulcast on over-the-air television on The CW, which is jointly owned by MTV parent company ViacomCBS and AT&T parent company WarnerMedia.

Keke Palmer hosted the show from a VR model of the infamous Manhattan staple, Empire State Building. The Weeknd won Video of the Year for "Blinding Lights", which he also performed as the show's opener. During his speech he showed support for the Black Lives Matter movement and demanded justice for Breonna Taylor and Jacob Blake.

Lady Gaga received the first-ever (and only thus far as of 2024) Tricon Award, introduced by Bella Hadid. After giving her speech, Gaga performed a medley of her songs, including "Chromatica II"/"911", "Stupid Love" and "Rain on Me", the latter performed with Ariana Grande. Grande also won four awards, including Song of the Year and Best Collaboration.

The show was dedicated to actor Chadwick Boseman, who died less than 48 hours before the ceremony due to colon cancer.

The redesigned moonperson trophy by Kehinde Wiley at the 2021 MTV Video Music Awards

2021: The 2021 MTV Video Music Awards were held September 12, 2021, at the Barclays Center in Brooklyn, New York City, for the first time in eight years. The award show also served as a celebration of MTV's 40th anniversary. An opening monologue was delivered by Madonna. Artist Kehinde Wiley redesigned the year's moonperson trophy, marking the third time that the statue had been transformed and the first from an artist of African-American descent.

Kim Petras performed her single "Future Starts Now", becoming the first openly transgender singer to perform at the VMAs.

Lil Nas X won three awards for "Montero (Call Me By Your Name)", including Video of the Year and Best Direction. He became the second artist and first LGBTQ+ artist to win both categories for a video they co-directed. He jokingly thanked the gay agenda in his acceptance speech.

Olivia Rodrigo and Justin Bieber also received awards in big categories, winning Song of the Year and Artist of the Year respectively. BTS won three awards, winning Group of the Year for the third consecutive time, in addition to Best K-Pop and Song of Summer for "Butter".

2022: Taylor Swift announced the release of her tenth studio album Midnights during her Video of the Year award acceptance speech. Swift also became the first ever artist to win Video of the Year three times.

Nicki Minaj won the Michael Jackson Video Vanguard award that night and performed a 9-minute medley of her hits including "Anaconda," "Super Bass", "Monster", "Beez in the Trap", and her newest hit "Super Freaky Girl" along with other songs. The award was presented by five members of her fan club the Barbz. In her acceptance speech, Minaj shouted out multiple people who had inspired her and people who have given her big opportunities early in her career including Madonna, Eminem, Britney Spears, Lil Wayne, Drake, Taylor Swift, Beyoncé, Rihanna, and more who had help boost the popularity of her 2011 hit, "Super Bass". Minaj also said that she wished musicians Whitney Houston and Michael Jackson were there to witness her. She also paid respects to her father, Robert Maraj, who died in a tragic hit-and-run accident in 2021. She said she wished people took mental health more seriously. Minaj thanked the Barbz, told the audience about her son, nicknamed Papa Bear, and announced her first greatest hits album, Queen Radio Vol. 1.

There were three co-hosts in the show, LL Cool J, Minaj, and Jack Harlow.

Harlow opened the show with a performance of his single, "First Class". The performance took place on an airplane with Harlow acting as an attendant. Several celebrities were seated in the plane including Lil Nas X, Saucy Santana, Avril Lavigne, and more. The plane "landed" at the award show and mocked a red carpet interview, with Harlow saying "Ladies and Gentlemen, Fergie!". Fergie had come out onstage to perform her 2007 hit "Glamorous" which "First Class" samples, marking her first televised performance since her controversial performance of "The Star-Spangled Banner" at the 2018 NBA All Star Game. The performance ended with Fergie and Harlow hugging.

Anitta becomes the first Brazilian singer to win a category at the MTV Video Music Awards.

2023: NSYNC reunited for the first time in 10 years at the ceremony, to present the award for Best Pop, which was to Taylor Swift's "Anti-Hero". Swift acknowledged that she still has the 'N Sync dolls, referencing the "It's Gonna Be Me" music video, and they gave her friendship bracelets.

Shakira was awarded with the Michael Jackson Video Vanguard Award, performing a medley of her hits. She became the first South-American born artist to receive the award. Later, Shakira and Karol G won the Best Collaboration award, for "TQG", making the first time a Spanish-language video and a Latin female collaboration won the award.

Taylor Swift won Video of the Year for a second consecutive year for "Anti-Hero", making her the artist with the most wins (four) in this category.

2024: The ceremony was originally scheduled to take place on September 10, 2024, but was pushed back by a day to avoid an overlap with the presidential debate between Donald Trump and Kamala Harris.

Taylor Swift won seven awards, including Video of the Year and Artist of the Year, breaking the record for most awards won overall, with thirty wins since 2009. Her Video of the Year win for "Fortnight" extended her record for the most wins and most consecutive wins in this category, with five wins and three years respectively.

2025: The 2025 Video Music Awards were held at the UBS Arena in Elmont, New York, on September 7, 2025. It was broadcast for the first time on CBS and available to stream on Paramount+ with a simulcast on MTV. The show was hosted by rapper and actor LL Cool J.

Lady Gaga was the most nominated and awarded artist, winning four trophies out of twelve nominations. Ariana Grande's Brighter Days Ahead was crowned Video of the Year. Mariah Carey was honored with the Michael Jackson Video Vanguard Award, presented by Grande. Two new special awards were given out; Busta Rhymes received the Rock the Bells Visionary, and Ricky Martin received the Latin Icon. The ceremony saw a 42% increase in viewership compared to the previous edition, its highest ratings in 6 years.

2026: The VMA's return to the Los Angeles Area since the 2017 MTV Video Music Awards. The ceremony will be held at the Peacock Theater in Downtown Los Angeles for the first time since the 2015 MTV Video Music Awards (back when it was named the Microsoft Theater). This will also be the first ceremony to be held in the fall.

== List of ceremonies ==
Year	Date	Venue	Host city	Host(s)	Video of the Year Winner	Ref.
1984	September 14	Radio City Music Hall	New York City	Dan Aykroyd and Bette Midler	"You Might Think" by The Cars (Directed by Jeff Stein and Charlex)	
1985	September 13	Radio City Music Hall	New York City	Eddie Murphy	"The Boys of Summer" by Don Henley (Directed by Jean-Baptiste Mondino)	
1986	September 5	The Palladium, Universal Amphitheatre	New York City, Los Angeles	MTV VJs: "Downtown" Julie Brown, Mark Goodman, Alan Hunter, Martha Quinn and Dweezil Zappa	"Money for Nothing" by Dire Straits (Directed by Steve Barron)	
1987	September 11	Universal Amphitheatre	Los Angeles	MTV VJs: "Downtown" Julie Brown, Carolyne Heldman, Dweezil Zappa and Kevin Seal	"Sledgehammer" by Peter Gabriel (Directed by Stephen R. Johnson)	
1988	September 7	Universal Amphitheatre	Los Angeles	Arsenio Hall	"Need You Tonight" / "Mediate" by INXS (Directed by Richard Lowenstein)	
1989	September 6	Universal Amphitheatre	Los Angeles	Arsenio Hall	"This Note's for You" by Neil Young (Directed by Julien Temple)	
1990	September 6	Universal Amphitheatre	Los Angeles	Arsenio Hall	"Nothing Compares 2 U" by Sinéad O'Connor (Directed by John Maybury)	
1991	September 5	Universal Amphitheatre	Los Angeles	Arsenio Hall	"Losing My Religion" by R.E.M. (Directed by Tarsem Singh)	
1992	September 9	UCLA's Pauley Pavilion	Los Angeles	Dana Carvey	"Right Now" by Van Halen (Directed by Mark Fenske)	
1993	September 2	Universal Amphitheatre	Los Angeles	Christian Slater	"Jeremy" by Pearl Jam (Directed by Mark Pellington)	
1994	September 8	Radio City Music Hall	New York City	Roseanne Barr	"Cryin'" by Aerosmith (Directed by Marty Callner)	
1995	September 7	Radio City Music Hall	New York City	Dennis Miller	"Waterfalls" by TLC (Directed by F. Gary Gray)	
1996	September 4	Radio City Music Hall	New York City	Dennis Miller	"Tonight, Tonight" by The Smashing Pumpkins (Directed by Jonathan Dayton and Valerie Faris)	
1997	September 4	Radio City Music Hall	New York City	Chris Rock	"Virtual Insanity" by Jamiroquai (Directed by Jonathan Glazer)	
1998	September 10	Universal Amphitheatre	Los Angeles	Ben Stiller	"Ray of Light" by Madonna (Directed by Jonas Åkerlund)	
1999	September 9	Metropolitan Opera House	New York City	Chris Rock	"Doo Wop (That Thing)" by Lauryn Hill (Directed by Big TV!)	
2000	September 7	Radio City Music Hall	New York City	Marlon Wayans and Shawn Wayans	"The Real Slim Shady" by Eminem (Directed by Dr. Dre and Philip Atwell)	
2001	September 6	Metropolitan Opera House	New York City	Jamie Foxx	"Lady Marmalade" by Christina Aguilera, Lil' Kim, Mýa and P!nk featuring Missy Elliott (Directed by Paul Hunter)	
2002	August 29	Radio City Music Hall	New York City	Jimmy Fallon	"Without Me" by Eminem (Directed by Joseph Kahn)	
2003	August 28	Radio City Music Hall	New York City	Chris Rock	"Work It" by Missy Elliott (Directed by Dave Meyers)	
2004	August 29	American Airlines Arena	Miami	—N/a	"Hey Ya!" by OutKast (Directed by Bryan Barber)	
2005	August 28	American Airlines Arena	Miami	Diddy	"Boulevard of Broken Dreams" by Green Day (Directed by Samuel Bayer)	
2006	August 31	Radio City Music Hall	New York City	Jack Black	"I Write Sins Not Tragedies" by Panic! At The Disco (Directed by Shane Drake)	
2007	September 9	Palms Casino Resort	Las Vegas	—N/a	"Umbrella" by Rihanna featuring Jay-Z (Directed by Chris Applebaum)	
2008	September 7	Paramount Studios	Los Angeles	Russell Brand	"Piece of Me" by Britney Spears (Directed by Wayne Isham)	
2009	September 13	Radio City Music Hall	New York City	Russell Brand	"Single Ladies (Put a Ring on It)" by Beyoncé (Directed by Jake Nava)	
2010	September 12	Nokia Theatre	Los Angeles	Chelsea Handler	"Bad Romance" by Lady Gaga (Directed by Francis Lawrence)	
2011	August 28	Nokia Theatre	Los Angeles	—N/a	"Firework" by Katy Perry (Directed by Dave Meyers)	
2012	September 6	Staples Center	Los Angeles	Kevin Hart	"We Found Love" by Rihanna featuring Calvin Harris (Directed by Melina Matsoukas)	
2013	August 25	Barclays Center	New York City	—N/a	"Mirrors" by Justin Timberlake (Directed by Floria Sigismondi)	
2014	August 24	The Forum	Inglewood, California	—N/a	"Wrecking Ball" by Miley Cyrus (Directed by Terry Richardson)	
2015	August 30	Microsoft Theater	Los Angeles	Miley Cyrus	"Bad Blood" by Taylor Swift featuring Kendrick Lamar (Directed by Joseph Kahn)	
2016	August 28	Madison Square Garden	New York City	—N/a	"Formation" by Beyoncé (Directed by Melina Matsoukas)	
2017	August 27	The Forum	Inglewood, California	Katy Perry	"HUMBLE." by Kendrick Lamar (Directed by Dave Meyers and The Little Homies)	
2018	August 20	Radio City Music Hall	New York City	—N/a	"Havana" by Camila Cabello featuring Young Thug (Directed by Dave Meyers)	
2019	August 26	Prudential Center	Newark, New Jersey	Sebastian Maniscalco	"You Need to Calm Down" by Taylor Swift (Directed by Taylor Swift and Drew Kirsch)	
2020	August 30	One Astor Plaza (Note: Actual location of studios where event was held.)	New York City	Keke Palmer	"Blinding Lights" by The Weeknd (Directed by Anton Tammi)	
2021	September 12	Barclays Center	New York City	Doja Cat	"Montero (Call Me by Your Name)" by Lil Nas X (Directed by Lil Nas X and Tanu Muino)	
2022	August 28	Prudential Center	Newark, New Jersey	Jack Harlow, LL Cool J and Nicki Minaj (Note: referred to as "Emcees")	All Too Well: The Short Film by Taylor Swift (Directed by Taylor Swift)	
2023	September 12	Prudential Center	Newark, New Jersey	Nicki Minaj (Note: referred to as "Emcee")	"Anti-Hero" by Taylor Swift (Directed by Taylor Swift)	
2024	September 11	UBS Arena	Elmont, New York	Megan Thee Stallion	"Fortnight" by Taylor Swift featuring Post Malone (Directed by Taylor Swift)	
2025	September 7	UBS Arena	Elmont, New York	LL Cool J	Brighter Days Ahead by Ariana Grande (Directed by Christian Breslauer and Ariana Grande)	
2026	September 27	Peacock Theater	Los Angeles	Snoop Dogg	"The Fate of Ophelia" by Taylor Swift (Directed by Taylor Swift)	

== Award categories ==
=== Votable categories ===
Winners of the following categories are chosen by fan votes through a voting process.

- Video of the Year
- Artist of the Year
- Song of the Year
- Best New Artist (awarded as Best New Artist in a Video from 1984 to 2006, Artist to Watch from 2013 to 2015, and Push Best New Artist in 2020)
- Best Group (awarded as Best Group Video from 1984 to 2007, and Group of the Year from 2021 to 2023)
- Best Dance (awarded as Best Dance Video from 1989 to 2006, Best Dancing in a Video in 2008, Best Dance Music Video in 2010, Best Electronic Dance Music Video in 2012, MTV Clubland Award in 2014, Best Electronic Video in 2016)
- Best Rock (awarded as Best Heavy Metal Video in 1989, Best Heavy Metal/Hard Rock Video from 1990 to 1995, Best Hard Rock Video in 1996, and Best Rock Video from 1997 to 2016)
- Best Alternative (awarded as Best Alternative Video from 1991 to 1998)
- Best Long Form Video (awarded as Breakthrough Long Form Video in 2016)
- Best R&B (awarded as Best R&B Video from 1993 to 2006)
- Best Hip-Hop (awarded as Best Hip-Hop Video from 1999 to 2016)
- Best Pop (awarded as Best Pop Video from 1999 to 2016)
- Best Collaboration (awarded as Most Earthshattering Collaboration in 2007)
- Best Latin (awarded as Best Latino Artist from 2010 to 2013)
- Song of Summer
- Best K-Pop
- Best Album
- Best Country (awarded as the CMT Music Awards Video of the Year from 2002 to 2024)

=== Professional categories ===
Winners of the following categories are chosen by members of the music industry.

- Best Direction
- Best Choreography
- Best Visual Effects (awarded as Best Special Effects from 1984 to 2011)
- Best Art Direction
- Best Editing
- Best Cinematography

=== Special awards ===
The following awards have special significance and are not necessarily awarded annually.

- Michael Jackson Video Vanguard Award (awarded as the Video Vanguard Award from 1984 to 1990, 2006, awarded as the Lifetime Achievement an Award in 1994 and 2003)
- Tricon Award (2020)
- Global Icon Award was introduced in 2021 and it is awarded to bands and musicians with "an unparalleled career and continued influence" and has achieved "global success in music and beyond."
  - Foo Fighters (2021)
  - Red Hot Chili Peppers (2022)
  - P. Diddy (2023)
- MTV VMA Artist Director Honors (2026)

=== Past award categories ===
- Special Recognition Award (1984–1986)
- Best Overall Performance in a Video (1984–1987)
- Most Experimental Video (1984–1987; replaced by Breakthrough Video)
- Best Concept Video (1984–1988)
- Best Stage Performance in a Video (1984–1989)
- Best Post-Modern Video (1989–1990; replaced by Best Alternative Video)
- Best Artist Website (1999)
- Best Video from a Film (1987–2003)
- International Viewer's Choice (1989–2003; awards for individual regions were created and eliminated in different years)
- Best Rap Video (1989–2006)
- MTV2 Award (2001–2006)
- Viewer's Choice (1984–2006)
- Best Video Game Soundtrack (2004–2006)
- Best Video Game Score (2006)
- Ringtone of the Year (2006)
- Quadruple Threat of the Year (2007)
- Monster Single of the Year (2007)
- Best UK Video (2008)
- Best Video (That Should Have Won a Moonman) (2009)
- Breakthrough Video (1988–2005, 2009–2010)
- Most Share-Worthy Video (2012)
- Best Latino Artist (2010–2013)
- Best Lyric Video (2014)
- Best Male Video (1984–2016; replaced by Artist of the Year)
- Best Female Video (1984–2016; replaced by Artist of the Year)
- Push Artist of the Year (2018–2019; merged with Best New Artist in 2020)
- Best Power Anthem (2019)
- MTV Fashion Trailbazer Award (2019)
- Best Music Video from Home (2020)
- Best Quarantine Performance (2020)
- Everyday Heroes: Frontline Medical Workers (2020)
- MTV Tricon Award (2020)
- VMAs Most Iconic Performance (2024)
- Best Trending Video (2024)
- Best Pop Artist (2025)
- Rock the Bells Visionary Award (2025)
- Latin Icon Award (2025)
- Video for Good (2011–2025)
- Push Performance of the Year (2022–2025)
- Best Afrobeats (2023-2025)

== Reception ==
The MTV Video Music Awards have been described as a prominent event in the mainstream music industry since its inauguration. However, some publications such as The Washington Post and HuffPost opined that the stature of the ceremony had declined by 2019. HuffPost cited reasons such as a lack of interest (declining attendances and viewership: in 2019 ratings hit an all-time low for the third straight year), lack of musical diversity, lack of celebrity, lack of credibility, and access to music online. The Washington Post states, "The moment the VMAs ceased to matter might have happened in 2014, when Drake didn't bother appearing to receive his award. Or maybe it was even earlier than that: The Associated Press compared the energy of the VMAs to the scripted reality-TV show Cribs all the way back in 2006." MTV has also faced criticism for devoting most of its airtime outside the VMAs to reality shows and dramas, with music videos mainly airing in off-peak graveyard slots to suffice the minimum amount of music programming in the network's carriage agreements.

=== Ratings ===
Ratings are not available prior to 1994 because MTV was not subscribing to Nielsen Media Research's program ratings prior to 1994. The field "Cumulative viewers" shows the audience of the live simulcasts of the ceremony across many ViacomCBS channels as a whole.

Year	Day	Time (ET)	Date	Households Rating	Households Share	MTV Viewers (in millions)	Cumulative TV Viewers (in millions) (not including Internet streams)
1994	Thursday	8:00–11:25pm	September 8, 1994	4.1	—N/a	5.36	—N/a
1995	Thursday	8:00–11:00pm	September 7, 1995	3.7	7	6.33	—N/a
1996	Wednesday	8:00–11:00pm	September 4, 1996	3.6	6	5.07	—N/a
1997	Thursday	8:00–11:00pm	September 4, 1997	5.2	9	7.47	—N/a
1998	Thursday	8:00–11:13pm	September 10, 1998	5.8	10	8.94	—N/a
1999	Thursday	8:00–11:13pm	September 9, 1999	8.0	14	11.96	—N/a
2000	Thursday	8:00–11:09pm	September 7, 2000	6.5	11	9.85	—N/a
2001	Thursday	8:00–11:26pm	September 6, 2001	6.6	11	10.76	—N/a
2002	Thursday	8:00–11:17pm	August 29, 2002	6.6	11	11.95	—N/a
2003	Thursday	8:00–11:03pm	August 28, 2003	6.4	11	10.71	—N/a
2004	Sunday	8:00–11:11pm	August 29, 2004	6.3	11	10.32	—N/a
2005	Sunday	8:00–11:23pm	August 28, 2005	5.0	8	8.01	—N/a
2006	Thursday	8:00–11:28pm	August 31, 2006	3.6	6	5.77	—N/a
2007	Sunday	9:00–11:12pm	September 9, 2007	4.0	7	7.082	—N/a
2008	Sunday	9:00–11:20pm	September 7, 2008	5.0	8	8.425	—N/a
2009	Sunday	9:00–11:21pm	September 13, 2009	7.5	8	8.972	—N/a
2010	Sunday	9:00–11:15pm	September 12, 2010	10	8	11.398	—N/a
2011	Sunday	9:00–11:27pm	August 28, 2011	10.8	—N/a	12.445	—N/a
2012	Thursday	8:00–10:00pm	September 6, 2012	2.8	—N/a	6.134	—N/a
2013	Sunday	9:00–11:28pm	August 25, 2013	7.8	—N/a	10.066	—N/a
2014	Sunday	9:00–11:13pm	August 24, 2014	4.2	—N/a	8.257	10.3
2015	Sunday	9:00–11:37pm	August 30, 2015	—N/a	—N/a	5.025	9.8
2016	Sunday	9:00–11:54pm	August 28, 2016	—N/a	—N/a	3.273	6.5
2017	Sunday	8:00–11:05pm	August 27, 2017	—N/a	—N/a	2.661	5.36
2018	Monday	9:00–11:43pm	August 20, 2018	—N/a	—N/a	2.250	4.87
2019	Monday	8:00–10:58pm	August 26, 2019	—N/a	—N/a	1.926	6.8
2020	Sunday	8:00–10:14pm	August 30, 2020	—N/a	—N/a	1.315	6.4
2021	Sunday	8:00–11:06pm	September 12, 2021	—N/a	—N/a	0.900	3.7
2022	Sunday	8:00–11:19pm	August 28, 2022	—N/a	—N/a	0.705	3.85
2023	Tuesday	8:00–11:51pm	September 12, 2023	—N/a	—N/a	0.913	3.78
2024	Wednesday	8:00–11:18pm	September 11, 2024	—N/a	—N/a	0.728	4.09
2025	Sunday	8:00–11:03pm	September 7, 2025	—N/a	—N/a	0.491	5.495
2026	Sunday	7:51–10:14pm (7:30pm scheduled)	September 27, 2026	—N/a	—N/a	0.686	8.99

== Most wins ==
Key
† indicates a Video of the Year–winning video.
‡ indicates a Video of the Year–nominated video

=== Most wins overall ===
Artist	Years	Number of awards (Note: The MTV "Biggest Winners" list only recognizes when artists win as a lead act, not as a featured act.)	Awarded work
Taylor Swift	2009–26	33	"You Belong with Me" (1); "I Knew You Were Trouble"‡ (1); "Blank Space" (2); "Bad Blood"† (2); "I Don't Wanna Live Forever" (1); "You Need to Calm Down"† (2); "Me!" (1); "The Man"‡ (1); All Too Well: The Short Film† (3); "Anti-Hero"† (6); Artist of the Year (2); The Eras Tour (1); Midnights (1); "Fortnight"† (5); Best Pop; Artist Director Honors; "The Fate of Ophelia"† (1); "Opalite" (1)
Beyoncé	2003–21	28	"Crazy in Love" (3); "Naughty Girl" (1); "Check on It" (1); "Beautiful Liar" (1); "Single Ladies (Put a Ring on It)"† (3); "Telephone"‡ (1) "Run the World (Girls)" (1); "Countdown"(1); Michael Jackson Video Vanguard Award; "Pretty Hurts" (2); "Drunk in Love"‡ (1); "7/11"‡ (1); "Hold Up" (1); Lemonade (1); "Formation"† (6); "Apeshit"‡ (2); "Brown Skin Girl" (1)
Madonna	1986–26	27	Video Vanguard Award; "Papa Don't Preach" (1); "Express Yourself" (3); "Like a Prayer"‡ (1); "Vogue"‡ (3); The Immaculate Collection (1); "Rain" (2); "Take a Bow" (1); "Ray of Light"† (5); "Frozen" (1); "Beautiful Stranger" (1); Artist of the Year; "Bring Your Love" (1); Confessions II – The Film (4); Confessions II (1)
Lady Gaga	2009–25	22	"Paparazzi" (2); "Poker Face"‡ (1); "Bad Romance"† (7); "Telephone"‡ (1); "Born This Way" (2); "Rain on Me"‡ (3); Tricon Award; Artist of the Year (2); "Abracadabra" (2); "Die with a Smile"‡ (1)
Eminem	1999–24	15	"My Name Is" (1); "Forgot About Dre" (1) "The Real Slim Shady"† (2); "Without Me"† (4); "Lose Yourself"‡ (1); "We Made You"‡ (1); "Not Afraid"‡ (2); "Rap God" (1); "Houdini"‡ (2)
Ariana Grande	2014–26	15	"Problem" (1); "No Tears Left to Cry"‡ (1); "7 Rings" (1); Artist of the Year (1); "Boyfriend" (1); "Rain on Me"‡ (3); "Stuck with U" (1); "We Can't Be Friends (Wait for Your Love)"‡ (1); Brighter Days Ahead† (3); "Hate That I Made You Love Me"‡ (2)
Peter Gabriel	1987–94	13	"Sledgehammer"† (9); Video Vanguard Award; "Steam" (2); "Kiss That Frog" (1)
BTS	2019–26	13	"Boy with Luv" (1); Best Group (5); "On" (3); "Butter" (2); "Swim" (2)
R.E.M.	1989–95	12	"Orange Crush" (1); "Losing My Religion"† (6); "Everybody Hurts"‡ (4); Michael Jackson Video Vanguard Award
Justin Timberlake	2003–13	11	"Cry Me a River"‡ (2); "Rock Your Body" (1); "What Goes Around... Comes Around"‡ (1); "Let Me Talk to You/My Love" (1); Male Artist of the Year; Quadruple Threat of the Year; Michael Jackson Video Vanguard Award; "Suit & Tie" (1); "Mirrors"† (2)
Green Day	1998–09	11	"Good Riddance (Time of Your Life)" (1); "Boulevard of Broken Dreams"† (6); "American Idiot" (1); "21 Guns" (3)
Aerosmith	1990–98	10	"Janie's Got a Gun"‡ (2); "The Other Side" (1); "Livin' on the Edge"‡ (1); "Cryin'"† (3); "Falling in Love (Is Hard on the Knees)" (1); "Pink" (1); "I Don't Want to Miss a Thing" (1)
Red Hot Chili Peppers	1992–22	10	"Give It Away" (2); "Under the Bridge"‡ (1); Best Artist Website; "Californication"‡ (2); Michael Jackson Video Vanguard Award; "Dani California"‡ (1); Global Icon Award; Black Summer (1)
Fatboy Slim	1999–01	9	"Praise You" (3); "Weapon of Choice"‡ (6)
Janet Jackson	1987–95	9	"Nasty" (1); "The Pleasure Principle" (1); "Rhythm Nation" (1); Video Vanguard Award; "Love Will Never Do (Without You)" (1); "If" (1); "Scream"‡ (3)
Kendrick Lamar	2015–25	9	"Alright"‡ (1); "HUMBLE."† (6); "All the Stars" (1); "Not Like Us" (1)
A-ha	1986	8	"Take On Me"‡ (6); "The Sun Always Shines on T.V." (2)
Coldplay	2002–25	8	"Trouble" (1); "The Scientist" (3); "Paradise" (1); "Up&Up" (1); "Orphans" (1); "All My Love" (1)
Lil Nas X	2019–22	8	"Old Town Road"‡ (2); "Montero (Call Me by Your Name)"† (3) "Industry Baby"‡ (3)
Michael Jackson	1984–95	8	"Thriller"‡ (3); Video Vanguard Award; "Leave Me Alone"‡ (1); "Scream"‡ (3)
Nicki Minaj	2011–23	8	"Super Bass" (1); "Starships" (1); "Anaconda" (1); "Chun-Li" (1); "Hot Girl Summer" (1); "Do We Have a Problem?" (1); Michael Jackson Video Vanguard Award; "Super Freaky Girl"‡ (1)
Billie Eilish	2019–25	8	"Bad Guy"‡ (1); Best New Artist; Push Artist of the Year; "Lo Vas a Olvidar" (1); "Your Power" (1); "Happier Than Ever" (1); "What Was I Made For?" (1); "Guess" (1)
Rihanna	2007–18	7	"Umbrella"† (2); "Live Your Life" (1); "We Found Love"† (1); "This Is What You Came For" (1); (Note: MTV counted featured artists as nominees for the first time in 2014, as they did for the 2016 and 2018 shows.) Michael Jackson Video Vanguard Award; "Lemon" (1)
NSYNC	2000–01	7	"Bye Bye Bye"‡ (3); "Pop" (4)
The Smashing Pumpkins	1996	7	"Tonight, Tonight"† (6); "1979" (1)
Jay-Z	1999–14	7	"Can I Get A..." (1); "99 Problems"‡ (4); "Empire State of Mind" (1); "Drunk in Love"‡ (1)
Katy Perry	2011–24	7	"Firework"† (1); "E.T." (2); "Wide Awake"‡ (1); "Dark Horse" (1); VMAs Most Iconic Performance; Michael Jackson Video Vanguard Award
P!nk	2001–17	7	"Lady Marmalade"† (2); "Get the Party Started" (2); "Stupid Girls" (1); "Just Give Me a Reason" (1); Michael Jackson Video Vanguard Award
En Vogue	1992–94	7	"My Lovin' (You're Never Gonna Get It)" (1); "Free Your Mind"‡ (3); "Whatta Man" (3)
Shakira	2000–25	7	"Ojos Así" (1); "Whenever, Wherever" (1); "Hips Don't Lie"‡ (1); "Beautiful Liar" (1); Michael Jackson Video Vanguard Award; "TQG" (1); "Soltera" (1)
Bruno Mars	2013–26	7	"Locked Out of Heaven"‡ (1); "Treasure" (1); "Leave the Door Open" (2); "Apt."‡ (1); "Die with a Smile‡ (1); "I Just Might"‡ (1)
Beck	1996–97	6	"Where It's At" (1); "Devils Haircut" (2); "The New Pollution"‡ (3)
Post Malone	2018–24	6	"Rockstar" (1); "Fortnight"† (5)
Britney Spears	2008–11	6	"Piece of Me"† (3); "Womanizer"‡ (1); "Till the World Ends" (1); Michael Jackson Video Vanguard Award
Justin Bieber	2010–21	6	"Baby" (1); "U Smile" (1); "Where Are Ü Now" (1); "Stuck with U" (1); Peaches (1); Artist of the Year
Missy Elliott	2003–19	6	"Work It"† (2); "Lose Control" (2); "We Run This" (1); Michael Jackson Video Vanguard Award
U2	1987–01	6	"With or Without You"‡ (1); "When Love Comes to Town" (1); "Even Better Than the Real Thing" (2); "Hold Me, Thrill Me, Kiss Me, Kill Me" (1); Michael Jackson Video Vanguard Award
Ricky Martin	1999–25	6	"Livin' la Vida Loca"‡ (5); MTV Latin Icon Award
Doja Cat	2020–25	6	Best New Artist; "Kiss Me More"‡ (1); "Best Friend" (1); "Woman"‡ (1); "Attention"‡ (1); "Born Again" (1)
Sabrina Carpenter	2024–26	6	"Espresso" (1); Best Pop (1); Short n' Sweet (1); "Manchild"‡ (1); "Bring Your Love" (1); "House Tour" (1)
Nirvana	1992–26	6	"Smells Like Teen Spirit"‡ (2); "In Bloom" (1); "Heart-Shaped Box"‡ (2); Video Vanguard Award
Paula Abdul	1987–89	5	"Nasty" (1, as choreographer); "Straight Up" (4)
Bruce Springsteen	1985–94	5	"I'm on Fire" (1); "We Are the World"‡ (2); "Dancing in the Dark" (1); "Streets of Philadelphia" (1)
Gnarls Barkley	2006–08	5	"Crazy" (2); "Smiley Faces" (1); "Run" (2)
Herbie Hancock	1984	5	"Rockit"‡ (5)
Don Henley	1985–90	5	"The Boys of Summer"† (4); "The End of the Innocence"‡ (1)
INXS	1988	5	"Need You Tonight / Mediate"† (5)
No Doubt	1997–04	5	"Don't Speak"‡ (1); "Hey Baby" (2); "It's My Life" (2)
OutKast	2001–04	5	"Ms. Jackson" (1); "Hey Ya!"† (4)
TLC	1995–99	5	"Waterfalls"† (4); "No Scrubs" (1)
The White Stripes	2002–08	5	"Fell in Love with a Girl"‡ (3); "Seven Nation Army" (1); "Conquest" (1)
J Balvin	2018–20	5	"Mi Gente" (1); "I Like It" (1); "Con Altura" (2); "Qué Pena" (1)
Kanye West	2005–17	5	"Jesus Walks"‡ (1); "Good Life" (1); "E.T." (1); Michael Jackson Video Vanguard Award; "Fade" (1)
Olivia Rodrigo	2021–26	5	Best New Artist; "Drivers License" (2); "Vampire"‡ (1); "The Cure" (1)

=== Most wins in a single night ===
Artist	Year	Number of awards	Awarded work
Peter Gabriel	1987	10	"Sledgehammer"† (9); Video Vanguard Award (for Gabriel)
Taylor Swift	2023	9	"Anti-Hero"† (6); Midnights (1); The Eras Tour (1); Artist of the Year (for Swift).
A-ha	1986	8	"Take On Me"‡ (6); "The Sun Always Shines on T.V." (2)
Lady Gaga	2010	8	"Bad Romance"† (7); "Telephone"‡ (1)
Beyoncé	2016	8	"Hold Up" (1); Lemonade (1); "Formation"† (6)
The Smashing Pumpkins	1996	7	"Tonight, Tonight"† (6); "1979" (1)
Green Day	2005	7	"Boulevard of Broken Dreams"† (6); "American Idiot" (1)
Taylor Swift	2024	7	"Fortnight"† (5); Best Pop (for Swift); Artist of the Year (for Swift).
Madonna	2026	7	Artist of the Year (for Madonna); Confessions II – The Film‡ (4); "Bring Your Love" (1); Confessions II (1)
R.E.M.	1991	6	"Losing My Religion"† (6)
Madonna	1998	6	"Ray of Light"† (5); "Frozen" (1)
Fatboy Slim	2001	6	"Weapon of Choice"‡ (6)
Kendrick Lamar	2017	6	"HUMBLE."† (6)
Herbie Hancock	1984	5	"Rockit"‡ (5)
INXS	1988	5	"Need You Tonight/Mediate"† (5)
Beck	1997	5	"The New Pollution"‡ (3); "Devils Haircut" (2)
Ricky Martin	1999	5	"Livin' La Vida Loca"‡ (5)
Lady Gaga	2020	5	"Rain on Me"‡ (3); Artist of the Year (for Gaga); Tricon Award (for Gaga)
Post Malone	2024	5	"Fortnight"† (5)

=== Most wins for a single video ===
Artist(s)	Year	Number of awards	Music video
Peter Gabriel	1987	9	"Sledgehammer"†
Lady Gaga	2010	7	"Bad Romance"†
A-ha	1986	6	"Take On Me"‡
R.E.M.	1991	6	"Losing My Religion"†
The Smashing Pumpkins	1996	6	"Tonight, Tonight"†
Fatboy Slim (featuring Bootsy Collins)	2001	6	"Weapon of Choice"‡
Green Day	2005	6	"Boulevard of Broken Dreams"†
Beyoncé	2016	6	"Formation"†
Kendrick Lamar	2017	6	"HUMBLE."†
Taylor Swift	2023	6	"Anti-Hero"†
Herbie Hancock	1984	5	"Rockit"‡
INXS	1988	5	"Need You Tonight / Mediate"†
Madonna	1998	5	"Ray of Light"†
Ricky Martin	1999	5	"Livin' La Vida Loca"‡
Taylor Swift (featuring Post Malone)	2024	5	"Fortnight"†

== Most nominations ==
Key
†	indicates a Video of the Year–winning video.
‡	indicates a Video of the Year–nominated video
*	indicates a video won at least 1 award

=== Most nominations overall ===
Artist	Years	Number of nominations	Nominated work
Beyoncé	2003–25	85	"Crazy in Love"* (4); "Me, Myself and I" (1); "Naughty Girl"* (4); "Check on It"* (1); "Beautiful Liar"* (4); Female Artist of the Year; "Irreplaceable"‡ (1); Quadruple Threat of the Year; "Single Ladies (Put a Ring on It)"*† (9); "Video Phone" (5); "Run the World (Girls)"* (3); "Countdown"* (3); "Love On Top" (1); "I Was Here" (1); "Pretty Hurts"* (4); "Drunk in Love"*‡ (2); "Partition" (2); "7/11"*‡ (5); "Hold Up"* (2); Lemonade* (1); "Formation"*† (6); "Freedom" (1); "Sorry" (1); "Apeshit"* (8); "Walk on Water" (1); "Savage (remix)" (1); "Already" (1); "Brown Skin Girl"* (2); "Break My Soul" (1); Artist of the Year (2); "Cuff It" (1); Renaissance World Tour (1); Renaissance (1); "Texas Hold 'Em" (2); VMAs Most Iconic Performance
Madonna	1984–26	84	"Borderline" (1); "Like a Virgin" (3); "Material Girl" (2); "Dress You Up" (1); "Like a Virgin" (live)(1); "Open Your Heart" (3); "Papa Don't Preach"* (3); "Express Yourself"* (5); "Like a Prayer"*‡ (2); "Vogue"*‡ (9); The Immaculate Collection* (1); "Like a Virgin" (Truth or Dare)(2); "Holiday" (Truth or Dare)(4); "Rain"* (2); "I'll Remember" (1); "Human Nature" (2); "Take a Bow"* (2); "You'll See" (1); "Ray of Light"*† (8); "Frozen"* (1); "Beautiful Stranger"* (3); Nothing Really Matters" (1); "American Pie" (1); "Don't Tell Me" (2); "Die Another Day" (1); "Hung Up"‡ (5); "4 Minutes" (1); Madame X (1); VMAs Most Iconic Performance (2); Artist of the Year* (1); Confessions II – The Film*‡ (9); "Bring Your Love"* (2); Confessions II* (1)
Taylor Swift	2008–26	82	"Teardrops on My Guitar" (1); "You Belong with Me"* (1); "Fifteen" (1); "Mean" (1); "I Knew You Were Trouble"*‡ (2); "Blank Space"* (2); "Bad Blood"*† (8); "I Don't Wanna Live Forever"* (1); "Look What You Made Me Do" (3); "You Need to Calm Down"*† (9); "Me!"* (3); "The Man"*‡ (3); "Lover" (2); "Cardigan" (1); "Willow" (3); All Too Well: The Short Film*† (5); "Anti-Hero"*† (7); Artist of the Year* (5); The Eras Tour* (1); Midnights* (1); "Karma" (1); "Fortnight"*† (9); Best Pop*; Artist of the Year* (4); VMAs Most Iconic Performance; "The Fate of Ophelia"*† (7); "Opalite"* (1); The Life of a Showgirl (1); "I Knew It, I Knew You" (1)
Eminem	1999–25	69	"Guilty Conscience" (1); "My Name Is"* (3); "Forgot About Dre"* (1) "The Real Slim Shady"*† (6); "Stan"‡ (5); "Without Me"*† (6); "Lose Yourself"*‡ (5); "Just Lose It" (1); "Mosh" (1); "Smack That" (1); "We Made You"*‡ (4); "Not Afraid"*‡ (8); "Love the Way You Lie" (4); "Berzerk" (1); "The Monster" (3); "Rap God"* (3); "River" (1); "Walk on Water" (1); "Godzilla"‡ (2); "From the D 2 the LBC" (1); Artist of the Year; "Houdini"*‡ (6); VMAs Most Iconic Performance; "Murdergram Deux" (1); "Somebody Save Me" (2)
Ariana Grande	2014–26	65	"Problem"* (4); "Bang Bang" (1); "Love Me Harder" (1); "Let Me Love You" (1); "Into You" (4); "Side to Side" (1); "No Tears Left to Cry"*‡ (4); "7 Rings"* (3); Artist of the Year* (6); "Boyfriend"* (1); "God is a Woman" (1); "Rule the World" (1); "Thank U, Next"‡ (5); "Rain On Me"*‡ (7); "Stuck With U" (2); "34+35" (1); "Positions" (1); Best Metaverse Performance; "The Boy Is Mine" (1); "We Can't Be Friends (Wait for Your Love)"*‡ (5); Best Pop Artist; Brighter Days Ahead*† (6); "Hate That I Made You Love Me"*‡ (7)
Drake	2009–26	55	"Best I Ever Had" (1); "Find Your Love" (1); "Forever" (1); "HYFR"* (1); Take Care"‡ (4); "Started from the Bottom" (2); "Hold On, We're Going Home"* (1); "Hotline Bling"*‡ (4); "One Dance" (1); "Work" (2); Artist of the Year (2); "God's Plan"‡ (5); "Walk It Talk It" (1); "In My Feelings" (2); "Sicko Mode" (1); "Mia" (1); "Life Is Good"‡ (3); "Toosie Slide" (1); "Popstar"‡ (3); "Laugh Now Cry Later" (2); "What's Next" (1); Certified Lover Boy (1); "Wait for U" (2); "Way 2 Sexy"‡ (3); It's All a Blur Tour (1); "Falling Back" (1); Her Loss (1); "Staying Alive" (1); "Rich Baby Daddy" (2); "Nokia" (1); "Janice STFU" (1); Iceman (1)
Lady Gaga	2009–26	54	"Paparazzi"* (5); "Poker Face"*‡ (4); "Bad Romance"*† (10); "Telephone"*‡ (3); "Born This Way"* (2); "Judas" (2); "Shallow" (2); "Rain on Me"*‡ (7); Artist of the Year* (2); Best Quarantine Performance; "911" (2); VMAs Most Iconic Performance; "Abracadabra"* (6); "Die with a Smile"*‡ (4); Mayhem (1); "Runway" (2)
Kendrick Lamar	2013–26	42	"Swimming Pools (Drank)" (2); "Alright"*‡ (4); "Freedom" (1); Artist of the Year (2); "HUMBLE."*† (7); "All the Stars"* (1); "Tints" (2); "Family Ties" (3); "The Heart Part 5" (2); "N95" (2); "Count Me Out" (2); "Rich Spirit" (1); "Like That" (1); "Not Like Us"*‡ (9); GNX (1); "Luther" (1); "Chains & Whips" (1)
Justin Bieber	2010–26	40	"Baby"* (1); "U Smile"* (1); "Boyfriend" (3); "#thatPOWER" (1); "Where Are Ü Now"* (4); Purpose: The Movement (1); "Sorry"‡ (2); "Cold Water" (2); "Despacito" (remix) (1); "I'm the One" (1); "No Brainer" (1); "I Don't Care" (2); "Intentions" (1); "Stuck with U"* (2); "Peaches"* (4); Artist of the Year* (2); "Holy" (1); "Popstar"‡ (2); "Stay" (4); Best Metaverse Performance; "Daisies" (1); Best Pop Artist; "Yukon" (1)
Bruno Mars	2011–26	40	"Grenade"‡ (3); "The Lazy Song" (1); "Locked Out of Heaven"*‡ (3); "Treasure"* (1); "24K Magic"‡ (3); Artist of the Year (3); "Finesse"‡ (Remix) (5); "Please Me" (1); "Leave the Door Open"* (3); "Apt."*‡ (7); "Die with a Smile"*‡ (4); "I Just Might"*‡ (4); "Risk It All" (1); The Romantic (1)
Billie Eilish	2019–25	39	Artist of the Year; "Bad Guy"*‡ (5); Best New Artist*; "Hostage" (1); Push Artist of the Year*; "When the Party's Over" (1); "All the Good Girls Go to Hell" (3); "Everything I Wanted"‡ (2); "Xanny" (1); "Lo Vas a Olvidar"* (1); "Therefore I Am" (2); "Your Power"* (2); "Happier Than Ever"* (5); Happier Than Ever (1); Happier Than Ever: A Love Letter to Los Angeles (1); "What Was I Made For"* (2); "Lunch"‡ (1); "Birds of a Feather"‡ (3); "Guess"* (5)
Janet Jackson	1987–01	38	"Nasty"* (3); "When I Think of You" (1); "The Pleasure Principle"* (2); "Rhythm Nation"* (2); "Love Will Never Do (Without You)"* (3); "That's the Way Love Goes" (3); "If"* (3); "Scream"*‡ (11); "Runaway" (1); "Together Again" (1); "What's It Gonna Be?!" (4); "All for You"‡ (4)
U2	1985–24	38	"Pride (In the Name of Love)" (1); "With or Without You"*‡ (7); "I Still Haven't Found What I'm Looking For"‡ (4); "Where the Streets Have No Name"‡ (4); "When Love Comes to Town"* (1); "Even Better Than the Real Thing"* (3); "Stay (Faraway, So Close!)" (1); "Hold Me, Thrill Me, Kiss Me, Kill Me"* (2); "Beautiful Day"‡ (1); "Elevation (Tomb Raider Mix)" (4); "Vertigo" (5); "Original of the Species" (2); "The Saints Are Coming" (1); "Where the Streets Have No Name" (1); "Atomic City" (1)
Kanye West	2004–19	37	"All Falls Down" (4); "Jesus Walks"*‡ (3); "Gold Digger" (3); Male Artist of the Year; Quadruple Threat of the Year; "Stronger"‡ (3); "Good Life"* (1); "Homecoming" (1); "Love Lockdown"‡ (3); "Paranoid" (1); "All of the Lights" (4); "Power" (2); "Otis" (1); "Mercy" (2); "Paris" (2); "Black Skinhead" (1); "Famous"‡ (2); "Fade"* (1); "I Love It" (1)
Aerosmith	1988–01	36	"Dude (Looks Like a Lady)" (2); "Rag Doll" (1); "Janie's Got a Gun"*‡ (8); "The Other Side"* (1); Things That Go Pump in the Night (1); "Livin' on the Edge"*‡ (6); Amazing" (5); "Cryin'"*† (4); "Falling in Love (Is Hard on the Knees)"* (1); "Pink"* (2); "I Don't Want to Miss a Thing"* (2); "Jaded" (3)
Jay-Z	1999–21	36	"Can I Get A..."* (3); "Big Pimpin'" (1); "I Just Wanna Love U (Give It 2 Me)" (1); "03 Bonnie & Clyde" (1); "99 Problems"*‡ (6); Quadruple Threat of the Year; "Umbrella"*† (3); "D.O.A. (Death of Auto-Tune)" (2); "Empire State of Mind"* (3); "On to the Next One" (1); "Otis" (1); "Paris" (2); "Drunk in Love"*‡ (2); "Apeshit"*‡ (8); "Entrepreneur" (1)
Missy Elliott	1997–24	36	"The Rain (Supa Dupa Fly)" (3); "Get Ur Freak On"‡ (6); "One Minute Man" (remix) (6); "Work It"*† (8); "I'm Really Hot" (2); "Lose Control"* (6); "We Run This"* (1); "Ching-a-Ling/Shake Your Pom Pom" (1); "WTF (Where They From)" (1); "Tempo" (1); VMAs Most Iconic Performance
Ed Sheeran	2013–25	35	"Lego House" (1); "Sing"* (1); "Don't" (2); "Thinking Out Loud"‡ (4); "Castle on the Hill" (1); "Shape of You" (2); Artist of the Year* (2); "Perfect" (3); "River" (1); "I Don't Care" (2); "Beautiful People" (1); "Bad Habits"‡ (4); "Bam Bam" (1); "Shivers"‡ (3); - Tour (1); "Eyes Closed" (2); "Sapphire" (4)
The Weeknd	2013–25	35	"Wicked Games" (2); "Earned It" (1); "Love Me Harder" (1); "Can't Feel My Face" (3); Artist of the Year (3); "Reminder"‡ (4); "Blinding Lights"*† (6); "Save Your Tears"‡ (1); "You Right" (1); "Out of Time"* (1); "Take My Breath" (1); "Tears in the Club" (1); "La Fama" (1); "One Right Now" (1); "Creepin'" (2); Hurry Up Tomorrow (album) (1); Hurry Up Tomorrow (film) (2); "Timeless"‡ (3)
Shakira	2000–26	35	"Ojos Así"* (2); "Whenever, Wherever"* (7); "La Tortura" (3); "Hips Don't Lie"*‡ (7); "Beautiful Liar"* (4); Latino Artist of the Year; "Chantaje" (1); "Girl Like Me" (1); Artist of the Year; "Acróstico" (1); "TQG"* (2); "Puntería" (1); "Soltera"* (1); Dai Dai (2); Choka Choka; (1)
Green Day	1994–25	33	"Longview" (3); "Basket Case"‡ (9); "Walking Contradiction" (1); "Good Riddance (Time of Your Life)"* (2); "Boulevard of Broken Dreams"*† (6); "American Idiot"* (2); "Wake Me Up When September Ends" (1); "The Saints Are Coming" (1); "21 Guns"* (3); "21st Century Breakdown" (1); "Bang Bang" (1); "Oh Yeah!" (1); "Dilemma" (1); "One Eyed Bastard" (1)
Michael Jackson	1984–14	32	"Thriller"*‡ (6); "Bad" (1); "The Way You Make Me Feel" (1); "Leave Me Alone"*‡ (6); "Smooth Criminal" (3); "In the Closet" (1); "Black or White" (1); "Jam" (1); "Scream"*‡ (11); Love Never Felt So Good" (1)
Katy Perry	2008–24	32	"I Kissed a Girl" (5); "Hot n Cold" (1); "California Gurls" (2); "Firework"*† (3); "E.T."* (5); "Last Friday Night (T.G.I.F.)" (1); "Teenage Dream" (1); "Part of Me" (1); "Wide Awake"*‡ (3); "Birthday" (1); "Dark Horse"* (2); "Bon Appétit" (1); "Chained to the Rhythm" (3); "Feels" (1); "Harleys in Hawaii: (1); VMAs Most Iconic Performance*
Coldplay	2001–25	32	"Yellow" (1); "Trouble"* (2); "The Scientist"* (3); "Speed of Sound"‡ (4); "Violet Hill" (2); "Viva la Vida" (4); "Strawberry Swing" (1); "Paradise"* (1); "Princess of China" (2); "Adventure of a Lifetime" (1); "Up&Up"* (2); "A Head Full of Dreams" (1); "Orphans"* (1); "Higher Power" (1); "My Universe" (1); Best Group (2); "Feels Like I'm Falling in Love" (2); "All My Love"* (1)
R.E.M.	1988–01	31	"The One I Love" (1); "Orange Crush"* (1); "Losing My Religion"*† (9); Tourfilm (1); "Man on the Moon" (6); "Everybody Hurts"*‡ (7); "What's the Frequency, Kenneth?" (1); "Tongue" (1); "The Great Beyond" (2); "Imitation of Life" (2)
Rihanna	2006–18	31	"SOS" (2); Female Artist of the Year; "Umbrella"*† (3); "Take a Bow" (2); "Live Your Life"* (1); "Rude Boy" (1); "We Found Love"*† (3); "Where Have You Been" (2); "Stay" (1); "The Monster" (3); "American Oxygen" (1); "This Is What You Came For"* (3); "Work" (2); "Wild Thoughts"‡ (4); "Lemon"* (2)
Cardi B	2018–26	31	Artist of the Year (2); "Bartier Cardi" (1); Best New Artist*; "Dinero"* (2); "Finesse"‡ (Remix) (5); "Girls Like You" (1); "I Like It"* (1); "Money"* (1); "Please Me" (1); "Taki Taki" (1); "Wish Wish" (1); "WAP"‡ (5); "Rumors" (1); "Wild Side" (4); "No Love" (Extended Version)(1); "Tomorrow 2" (1); "Puntería" (1); "Safe" (1)
Red Hot Chili Peppers	1990–23	30	"Higher Ground" (3); "Give It Away"* (6); "Under the Bridge"*‡ (3); "Warped" (1); Best Artist Website*; "Californication"*‡ (5); "By the Way" (1); "Dani California"*‡ (7); Best Group; "Black Summer"* (1); "Tippa My Tongue" (1)
Britney Spears	1999–24	30	"...Baby One More Time" (4); "Oops!...I Did It Again" (3); "(You Drive Me) Crazy" (1); "Stronger" (1); "I'm a Slave 4 U" (3); "Boys (The Co-Ed Remix)" (1); "Toxic"‡ (4); "Piece of Me"*† (3); "Circus" (5); "Womanizer"*‡ (2); "Till the World Ends"* (2); VMAs Most Iconic Performance
Doja Cat	2020–26	28	Best New Artist*; "Say So" (3); Artist of the Year (2); "Kiss Me More"*‡ (2); "Best Friend"* (1); "Need to Know" (1); "You Right" (1); "Get Into It (Yuh)" (2); "Vegas" (1); "Woman"*‡ (4); "I Like You (A Happier Song)" (2); "Attention"*‡ (3); "Paint the Town Red"‡ (2); "Born Again"* (1); "Jealous Type" (1), "Okayyy" (1)
Foo Fighters	1996–23	27	"Big Me"*‡ (5); "Monkey Wrench" (2); "Everlong" (3); "Learn to Fly" (2); "Best of You" (2); "The Pretender" (1); "Everlong" (1); "Walk"* (1); "Run" (1); "The Sky Is a Neighborhood" (1); "Shame Shame" (3); Best Group (2); Studio 666 (1); "Love Dies Young" (1); "The Teacher" (1)
Justin Timberlake	2003–24	26	"Cry Me a River"*‡ (5); "Rock Your Body"* (2); "Señorita" (1); "What Goes Around... Comes Around"*‡ (3); "Let Me Talk to You/My Love"* (1); Male Artist of the Year*; Quadruple Threat of the Year*; "SexyBack (1); "Suit & Tie"* (2); "Mirrors"*† (4); "Love Never Felt So Good" (1); "Can't Stop the Feeling!" (1); "Filthy" (1); "Say Something" (1); "Selfish" (1)
Miley Cyrus	2017–25	26	"7 Things" (2); "We Can't Stop" (4); "Wrecking Ball"*† (2); "Malibu" (1); "Mother's Daughter"* (4); "Midnight Sky" (1); Prisoner" (2); Endless Summer Vacation (1); "Flowers"‡ (4); "River" (1) "Easy Lover" (1); "End Of The World" (1); Best Pop Artist; Something Beautiful (1)
Dua Lipa	2018–24	26	"IDGAF" (1); "New Rules" (1); "One Kiss" (2); "Electricity" (1); "Break My Heart" (1); "Don't Start Now" (1); "Physical"* (3); "Levitating" (2); "Prisoner" (2); "Un Dia (One Day)" (1); "Cold Heart (Pnau Remix)" (2); "Sweetest Pie" (3); "Dance the Night" (3); Best Pop; "Houdini"* (1); "Illusion" (1)
Megan Thee Stallion	2019–26	26	"Hot Girl Summer"* (1); Artist of the Year (2); "Savage"* (2); "Savage (remix)" (1); "WAP"‡ (5); "On Me (remix)" (1); "Thot Shit" (1); "Sweetest Pie" (3); "Her" (3); "Boa"* (4); "Mamushi"* (1); "Wanna Be" (2); "Lover Girl" (1)
Christina Aguilera	2000–24	25	"What a Girl Wants" (5); "Lady Marmalade"*† (6); "Dirrty" (4); "The Voice Within" (3); "Ain't No Other Man"‡ (4); "Candyman" (1); "Feel This Moment" (1); VMAs Most Iconic Performance
SZA	2017–25	25	Best New Artist; Push Artist of the Year; "The Weekend" (1); "All the Stars"* (1); "Just Us" (1); "Kiss Me More"*‡ (2); "Good Days" (1); "No Love" (Extended Version)(1); "Shirt"* (2); SOS (1); "Kill Bill"‡ (5); Artist of the Year; "Rich Baby Daddy" (2); "Saturn" (1); "Snooze"*‡ (2); "Drive" (1); "Luther" (1)
Nicki Minaj	2011–23	24	"Massive Attack" (1); "Moment 4 Life" (1); "Super Bass"* (2); "Beez in the Trap" (1); "Turn Me On" (1); "Starships"* (1); "Anaconda"* (2); "Bang Bang" (1); "Hey Mama" (1); "Side to Side" (1); "Chun-Li"* (1); "Hot Girl Summer"* (1); "Tusa" (2); "Do We Have a Problem?"* (1); "Super Freaky Girl"*‡ (4); Artist of the Year; "Barbie World" (1); "Love in the Way" (1)
BTS	2019–26	24	"Boy with Luv"* (4); Best Group* (5); "On"* (3); "Butter"* (5); "Dynamite" (1); Best Metaverse Performance; "My Universe" (1); "Permission to Dance" (1); "Yet to Come (The Most Beautiful Moment)" (1); "Swim" (2)
Olivia Rodrigo	2021–26	24	Artist of the Year; Best New Artist*; "Drivers License"* (2); "Good 4 U" (2); "Brutal"‡ (2); Driving Home 2 U (1); "Traitor" (1); "Vampire"*‡ (6); "Bad Idea Right?" (1); Best Pop; "Get Him Back!" (1); "Obsessed" (1); "Drop Dead" (1); "The Cure"* (1); You Seem Pretty Sad for a Girl So in Love (1); "Stupid Song" (1)
Jennifer Lopez	1999–18	23	"If You Had My Love" (4); Best Artist Website; "Waiting for Tonight"* (2); "Love Don't Cost a Thing" (2); "I'm Real (Murder Remix)"* (1); "I'm Glad" (4); "Get Right" (4); Best Latino Artist; "Dance Again" (1); "Live It Up" (1); "Dinero"* (2)
Sabrina Carpenter	2024–26	23	Artist of the Year (2); Best Pop; "Espresso"* (2); "Please Please Please" (3); Best Pop Artist*; "Manchild"*‡ (7); Short n' Sweet* (1); "Tears"‡ (1); "Bring Your Love"* (2); "House Tour"* (4); Man's Best Friend (1)
Peter Gabriel	1987–94	22	"Big Time" (2); "Sledgehammer"*† (10); "Biko" (1); POV (1); "Digging in the Dirt"‡ (3); "Steam"* (3); "Kiss That Frog"* (2)
Lil Nas X	2019–22	22	Best New Artist; "Old Town Road"*‡ (8); "Montero (Call Me by Your Name)"*† (5) "Industry Baby"*‡ (7); Artist of the Year
Linkin Park	2001–25	22	"Crawling" (2); "In The End"*‡ (3); "Somewhere I Belong"* (1); "Breaking the Habit"* (2); Best Group; "What I've Done" (2); "Bleed It Out" (1); "Shadow of the Day"* (2); "Waiting for the End" (1); "Burn It Down" (2); "Until It's Gone" (1); "One More Light" (1); "Lost" (Original) (1); "Friendly Fire" (1); "The Emptiness Machine" (1)
Post Malone	2018–25	22	Artist of the Year (2); "Rockstar"* (1); "Better Now" (1); "Goodbyes" (1); "Circles" (1); Best Quarantine Performance; "One Right Now" (1); "I Like You (A Happier Song)" (2); "Fortnight"*† (9); "I Had Some Help" (2); "Pour Me a Drink" (1)
P!nk	2000–23	21	"There You Go" (1); "Lady Marmalade"*† (6); "Get the Party Started"* (3); "Stupid Girls"* (1); "So What" (1); "Funhouse" (2); "Fuckin' Perfect" (1); "Just Give Me a Reason"* (3); "What About Us" (1); "All I Know So Far" (1); "Trustfall" (1)
Adele	2008–23	21	"Chasing Pavements" (1); "Rolling in the Deep"*‡ (7); "Someone Like You" (1); "Hello"‡ (7); "Send My Love (To Your New Lover)" (1); 30 (1); "Easy On Me" (1); "Oh My God" (1); "I Drink Wine" (1)
Chris Brown	2006–25	21	"Run It!" (2); "Yo (Excuse Me Miss)" (1); "Wall to Wall" (1); "Forever"‡ (3); "Kiss Kiss" (1); "With You"* (1); "Look at Me Now" (2); "Turn Up the Music"* (2); "Fine China" (1); "Loyal" (1); Royalty (1); "Come Through" (1); "Go Crazy" (1); "How Does It Feel" (1); "Sensational" (1); "Residuals" (1)
Harry Styles	2017–26	21	"Sign of the Times" (2); "Adore You" (3); "Watermelon Sugar" (1); "Treat People with Kindness"* (3); Artist of the Year; "As It Was"*‡ (5); Harry's House* (1); "Late Night Talking" (1); "Music for a Sushi Restaurant" (1); "Aperture" (1); "Dance No More" (1); Kiss All the Time. Disco, Occasionally (1)
Usher	1998–24	19	"You Make Me Wanna..." (1); "U Don't Have to Call" (1); "U Got It Bad" (2); "Burn" (1); "Yeah!"*‡ (4); "Caught Up" (1); "My Boo" (1); "Love in This Club" (1); "OMG" (3); "Climax" (1); "Good Kisser" (1); "Good Good" (1); "Ruin" (1)
NSYNC	1999–24	19	"Tearin' Up My Heart" (3); "Bye Bye Bye"*‡ (6); "Pop"* (6); "Girlfriend" (remix) (2); "Gone"‡ (1); Best Group
Björk	1993–09	19	"Human Behaviour" (7); "Army of Me" (2); "It's Oh So Quiet"* (6); "Bachelorette"* (1); "All Is Full of Love"* (2); "Human Behaviour" (1)
Bad Bunny	2018–26	19	"I Like It"* (1); "Mia" (1); "Yo Perreo Sola" (1); "Dakiti" (1); "Un Dia (One Day)" (1); Artist of the Year* (3); "Tití Me Preguntó" (1); "Me Porto Bonito" (1); Un Verano Sin Ti (1); "El Apagón – Aquí Vive Gente" (1); "Un x100to" (1); "Where She Goes" (1); "Monaco" (1); "Baile Inolvidable" (1); Debí Tirar Más Fotos (1); Debí Tirar Más Fotos (Short Film) (1); "Nuevayol"* (1)
Charli XCX	2014–26	19	"Boom Clap" (1); "Fancy"‡ (4); Best Metaverse Performance; "360" (1); "Apple" (1); "Von Dutch" (1); "Guess"* (5); Best Pop Artist; "SS26" (2); Music, Fashion, Film (1); "Camera" (1)
Alicia Keys	2001–24	18	"Fallin'"* (2); "A Woman's Worth" (2); "If I Ain't Got You"* (2); "You Don't Know My Name" (1); "Karma"* (1); "My Boo" (1); "Empire State of Mind"* (3); "Raise a Man" (1); "Underdog" (1); "City of Gods (Part II)" (1); "Stay"(1); "If I Ain't Got You" (Orchestral) (1); "Lifeline" (1)
The White Stripes	2002–08	18	"Fell in Love with a Girl"*‡ (4); "Seven Nation Army"* (4); "The Hardest Button to Button" (4); "Blue Orchid" (3); Best Group; "Conquest"* (2)
Will Smith	1997–02	18	"Men in Black"* (4); "Gettin' Jiggy Wit It"*‡ (5); "Just the Two of Us"* (1); "Miami"* (3); "Wild Wild West"‡ (3); "Black Suits Comin' (Nod Ya Head)" (2)
En Vogue	1992–94	18	"My Lovin' (You're Never Gonna Get It)"* (6); "Free Your Mind"*‡ (8); "Runaway Love" (1); "Whatta Man"* (3)
TLC	1995–14	17	"Waterfalls"*† (10); "No Scrubs"* (6); "Crooked Smile" (1)
Paula Abdul	1987–95	17	"Nasty"* (1, as choreographer); "When I Think of You" (1, as choreographer); "Straight Up"* (6); "Opposites Attract" (6); "Rush Rush" (1); "My Love Is for Real" (2)
DJ Khaled	2017–23	17	"I'm the One" (1); "Wild Thoughts"‡ (4); "Dinero"* (2); "No Brainer" (1); "Higher" (1); "Just Us" (1); "Wish Wish" (1); Popstar"‡ (3); "Every Chance I Get" (1); "Big Energy" (remix)(1); Staying Alive" (1)
Blackpink	2019–26	17	Best Group* (7); "Kill This Love" (1); "How You Like That"* (1); Ice Cream" (1); Best Metaverse Performance*; Born Pink World Tour (1); "Pink Venom"* (4); "Jump"; (1)
Fall Out Boy	2005–23	16	"Sugar, We're Goin Down"* (1); "Dance, Dance"* (2); Best Group*; "Thnks fr th Mmrs" (1); "Beat It" (1); "I Don't Care" (1); "My Songs Know What You Did in the Dark (Light Em Up)" (1); "Uma Thurman"* (1); "Irresistible" (1); "Young and Menace" (1); "Champion" (1); "Bishops Knife Trick" (1); "Dear Future Self (Hands Up)" (1); "Hold Me Like a Grudge" (1); "Love from the Other Side" (1)
Busta Rhymes	1996–11	16	"Woo Hah!! Got You All in Check" (1); "Put Your Hands Where My Eyes Could See" (4); "Gimme Some More" (1); "What's It Gonna Be?!" (4); "Pass the Courvoisier, Part II" (1); "I Know What You Want" (1); "Touch It Remix" (2); "Look at Me Now" (2)
Bruce Springsteen	1985–97	16	"Dancing in the Dark"* (2); "I'm on Fire"* (1); "Glory Days" (2); "Born to Run" (1); "War" (1); "Tunnel of Love"‡ (5); "Human Touch" (1); "Streets of Philadelphia"* (2); "Secret Garden" (1)
Camila Cabello	2017–24	16	"OMG" (1); Artist of the Year*; "Havana"*† (4); "Señorita"* (5); "My Oh My" (1); "Don't Go Yet" (1); "Bam Bam" (1); Best Pop; "I Luv It" (1)
The Smashing Pumpkins	1994–99	16	"Disarm" (2); "1979"* (1); "Tonight, Tonight"*† (8); "The End Is the Beginning Is the End" (4); Best Artist Website
Selena Gomez	2012–25	16	"Love You like a Love Song" (1); "Come & Get It"* (2); "Good for You" (1); "Kill Em with Kindness" (1); "It Ain't Me" (1); "We Don't Talk Anymore" (1); "I Can't Get Enough" (1); "Taki Taki" (1); "Boyfriend" (1); "Ice Cream" (1); "Calm Down"* (3); "Sunset Blvd" (1); "Younger and Hotter Than Me" (1)
Twenty One Pilots	2013–26	16	"Holding on to You" (1); "Heathens"* (1); "Heavydirtysoul"* (1); "My Blood" (1); Best Group (5); "Level of Concern" (2); "Shy Away" (1); "Saturday" (1); Best Metaverse Performance; "The Contract" (1); "Drag Path" (1)
George Michael	1988–09	15	"Faith" (1); "Father Figure"* (2); "Freedom! '90" (5); "Killer / Papa Was a Rollin' Stone"* (3); "Fastlove"* (3); "Freedom! '90" (1)
Panic! at the Disco	2006–23	15	"I Write Sins Not Tragedies"*† (5); "Nine in the Afternoon" (2); "Victorius" (1); "Say Amen (Saturday Night)" (1); "High Hopes"* (1); "Me!"* (3); "Viva Las Vengeance" (1); "Middle of a Breakup" (1)
Thirty Seconds to Mars	2006–23	15	"The Kill"* (2); "Kings and Queens"*‡ (4); "Hurricane" (3); "Up in the Air"* (3); "City of Angels" (1); "Walk on Water" (1); "Stuck" (1)
Beck	1994–06	15	"Loser" (3); "Where It's At"* (2); "Devils Haircut"* (2); "The New Pollution"*‡ (5); "Deadweight" (1); "E-Pro" (1); "Hell Yes" (1)
Demi Lovato	2012–25	15	"Skyscraper"* (1); "Heart Attack" (1); "Really Don't Care" (1); "Cool For The Summer" (1); "Irresistible" (1); "Sorry Not Sorry" (2); "Échame la Culpa" (1); "Solo" (1); "I Love Me" (2); "Dancing with the Devil" (1); "Swine" (2); "Fast" (1)
Metallica	1989–23	14	"One" (1); "Enter Sandman"* (3); "Until It Sleeps"* (2); "The Unforgiven II" (1); "I Disappear" (5); "St. Anger" (1); "Lux Æterna" (1)
Halsey	2016–21	14	"Closer" (3); "Now or Never" (1); Artist of the Year; "Boy with Luv"* (4); "Nightmare" (2); "Graveyard" (1); "You Should Be Sad" (1); "Be Kind" (1)
Steve Winwood	1987–89	14	"Higher Love"‡ (7); "Back in the High Life Again" (1); "Roll with It"‡ (6)
Jonas Brothers	2008–25	14	"Burnin' Up"‡ (2); Artist of the Year; Best Group (4); "Sucker"*‡ (4); "What a Man Gotta Do" (1); "Do It Like That" (1); "Waffle House" (1)
J Balvin	2018–25	14	"Mi Gente"* (1); "I Like It"* (1); "Con Altura"* (3); "I Can't Get Enough" (1); "Say My Name" (1); "Amarillo" (1); "China" (1); "Qué Pena"* (1); "Ritmo (Bad Boys for Life)" (1); "Un Dia (One Day)" (1); "In da Getto" (1); "Rio" (1)
Imagine Dragons	2012–25	14	"It's Time" (1); "Radioactive" (1); "Demons" (1); "Thunder" (1); "Whatever It Takes"* (1); "Natural" (1); "Follow You" (1); Best Group (3); "Enemy" (1); "Crushed" (1); "Eyes Closed" (1); "Wake Up" (1)
David Bowie	1984–16	13	"China Girl"* (3); "Modern Love" (1); "Blue Jean (live)" (1); "Dancing in the Street"* (1); "Day-In Day-Out" (1); "I'm Afraid of Americans" (1); Best Artist Website; "Blackstar"* (1); "Lazarus" (3)
Calvin Harris	2012–18	13	"Feel So Close"* (1); "I Need Your Love" (2); "Sweet Nothing" (1); "Summer" (1); "How Deep Is Your Love"* (1); This Is What You Came For"* (3); "Feels" (1); "My Way" (1); "One Kiss" (2)
ZZ Top	1984–90	13	"Gimme All Your Lovin'" (1); "Legs"* (2); "Sharp Dressed Man"* (3); "Rough Boy"* (6); "Doubleback" (1)
Don Henley	1985–90	13	"The Boys of Summer"*† (7); "The End of the Innocence"*‡ (6)
Young Thug	2017–22	13	"Wyclef Jean"* (1); "Havana"*† (4); "Goodbyes" (1); "The London" (1); "Franchise"* (2); "Go Crazy" (1); "Way 2 Sexy"‡ (3)
Eurythmics	1984–88	13	"Sweet Dreams (Are Made of This)"* (1); "Would I Lie to You?" (5); "Missionary Man" (5); "I Need a Man" (1); "You Have Placed a Chill in My Heart" (1)
Shawn Mendes	2017–21	13	"There's Nothing Holdin' Me Back" (1); "Treat You Better" (1); "In My Blood" (3); Artist of the Year; "Señorita"* (5); "Summer of Love" (1); "Wonder" (1)
Fatboy Slim	1999–01	13	"Praise You"* (4); "Weapon of Choice"*‡ (9)
Karol G	2019–26	13	"Secreto" (1); China" (1); "Tusa" (2); "Bichota" (1); "Mamiii" (1); Artist of the Year; Mañana Será Bonito Tour (1); "TQG"* (2); "Mi Ex Tenía Razón" (1); "Si Antes Te Hubiera Conocido" (1); "Papasito" (1)
Prince	1985–06	12	"When Doves Cry" (1); "Raspberry Beret"* (1); "U Got the Look"* (4); "I Wish U Heaven" (1); "Batdance" (1); "Cream"* (1); "7" (1); "Musicology" (1); "Black Sweat" (1)
Radiohead	1996–09	12	"Just" (1); "Paranoid Android" (2); "Karma Police" (4); "There There"* (4); "Karma Police" (1)
Childish Gambino	2012–19	12	"Heartbeat" (1); "3005" (1); "Sober" (1); "Telegraph Ave." (1); "This Is America"*‡ (7); "Feels Like Summer" (1)
Jack Harlow	2020–24	12	Best New Artist; "Whats Poppin" (1); Artist of the Year; "Industry Baby"*‡ (7); "First Class"* (1); "Lovin on Me" (1)
Cyndi Lauper	1984–87	12	"Girls Just Want to Have Fun"*‡ (6); "Time After Time" (3); "She Bop" (1); "True Colors" (1); "What's Going On" (1)
Lizzo	2019–22	12	Best New Artist; Push Artist of the Year; "Tempo" (1); "Truth Hurts" (1); "Cuz I Love You" (1); "Good as Hell" (1); "Rumors" (1); Artist of the Year; "About Damn Time"* (4)
Tate McRae	2020–26	12	Push Best New Artist; "Greedy"; "Sports Car"; Best Pop Artist; "Just Keep Watching" (3); "What I Want"; "Nobody's Girl" (3)
Black Eyed Peas	1999–21	11	"Joints and Jam" (1); "Request + Line" (1); "Hey Mama"* (3); "Dont Phunk with my Heart" (1); "My Humps"* (2); "Mamacita" (1); "Ritmo (Bad Boys for Life)" (1); "Girl Like Me" (1)
Lil Wayne	2006–23	11	"Fireman" (1); "Lollipop"* (2); "6 Foot 7 Foot" (1); "Look at Me Now" (2); "How To Love" (1); "Loyal" (1); "Let Me Love You" (1); "I'm the One" (1); “Kant Nobody" (1)
Destiny's Child	2000–16	11	"Say My Name"* (3); "Independent Women Part I" (2); "Survivor"* (3); "Lose My Breath" (1); "Soldier" (1); "The Girl Is Mine" (1)
Bryan Adams	1985–96	11	"Heaven" (1); "Run to You" (5); "It's Only Love"* (1); "Summer of '69" (1); "(Everything I Do) I Do It for You" (1); "Have You Ever Really Loved a Woman?" (1); "The Only Thing That Looks Good on Me Is You" (1)
Kelly Clarkson	2003–13	11	"Miss Independent" (3); "Since U Been Gone"* (3); "Because of You"* (2); "My Life Would Suck Without You" (1); "Dark Side" (1); "People Like Us" (1)
Van Halen	1984–92	11	"Jump"* (3); "Finish What Ya Started" (1); "Right Now"*† (7)
Future	2017–24	11	"Mask Off" (1); "Life Is Good"‡ (3); "Wait for U" (2); "Way 2 Sexy"‡ (3); "Superhero (Heroes & Villains)" (1); "Like That" (1)
No Doubt	1997–04	11	"Don't Speak"*‡ (2); "Hey Baby"* (2); "Underneath It All" (2); "It's My Life"* (5)
Gwen Stefani	2001–07	11	"Let Me Blow Ya Mind"* (3); "South Side"* (1); "Hollaback Girl"*‡ (4); "What You Waiting For?"* (2); "The Sweet Escape" (1)
MC Hammer	1989–94	11	"Turn This Mutha Out" (1); "U Can't Touch This"* (5); "Here Comes The Hammer" (1);"Pray" (1); "2 Legit 2 Quit" (1); "Addams Groove" (1); "Pumps and a Bump" (1)
Garbage	1996–99	11	"Stupid Girl" (1); "Queer" (1); "Push It" (8); "Special"* (1)
INXS	1986–89	11	"What You Need" (1); "Devil Inside" (1); "Need You Tonight / Mediate"*† (8); "New Sensation" (1)
Korn	1999–02	11	"Freak on a Leash"*‡ (9); "Falling Away from Me" (1); "Here to Stay" (1)
Ricky Martin	1999–00	11	"Livin' la Vida Loca"*‡ (9); "Shake Your Bon-Bon" (2)
A-ha	1986	11	"Take On Me"*‡ (8); "The Sun Always Shines on T.V."* (3)
Dire Straits	1986	11	"Money for Nothing"*† (11)
Rosalía	2019–26	11	Best New Artist; "Con Altura"* (3); "A Palé" (1); "Lo Vas a Olvidar"* (1); "Bizcochito" (1); "La Fama" (1); "Saoko"* (1); "Despechá" (1); "La Perla" (1)
Travis Scott	2019–26	11	"The London" (1); "Sicko Mode" (1); "Highest in the Room" (2); "Franchise"* (2); "Fe!n" (1); "4x4" (1); "Active" (1); "TaTaTa" (1); "Dumbo"
Elton John	1984–22	10	"I'm Still Standing" (2); "Sad Songs (Say So Much)"* (1); "Candle in the Wind (live)" (1); "Believe" (1); "This Train Don't Stop There Anymore" (3); "Cold Heart (Pnau Remix)" (2)
Diddy	1997–23	10	"I'll Be Missing You"* (2); "It's All About the Benjamins"*‡ (2); "Come with Me" (1); "Bad Boy for Life" (1); "Creepin'" (2); "Gotta Move On" (2)
Brandy	1995–16	10	"Baby" (1); "I Wanna Be Down" (1); "Brokenhearted" (1); "Sittin' Up in My Room" (1); "The Boy Is Mine"‡ (2); "Have You Ever?" (1); "What About Us?" (1); "Talk About Our Love" (1); "The Girl Is Mine" (1)
Dr. Dre	1993–09	10	"Nuthin' but a 'G' Thang" (1); "Let Me Ride" (1); "Keep Their Heads Ringin"* (1); "Been There, Done That" (2); "My Name Is" (1, as director); "Forgot About Dre"* (1) "The Real Slim Shady" (1, as director); "Stan" (1, as director); "Nuthin' but a 'G' Thang" (1)
John Legend	2005–20	10	"Ordinary People" (3); "All of Me" (1); "One Man Can Change the World"* (1); "Surefire"* (1); "Higher" (1); "Preach" (1); Best Quarantine Performance; "Bigger Love" (1)
Engenheiros do Hawaii	1990–03	10	"Alívio Imediato" (1); "Refrão de Bolero" (1); "O Exército de um Homem Só" (1); "Parabólica" (1); "A Promessa" (1); "A Montanha" (1); "Eu Que Não Amo Você" (1); "Negro Amor" (1); "3a do Plural" (1); "Até o Fim" (1)
Os Paralamas do Sucesso	1990–03	10	"Perplexo" (1); "Caleidoscópio" (1); "Trac Trac" (1); "Uma Brasileira"* (1); "Lourinha Bombril" (1); "La Bella Luna" (1); "Ela Disse Adeus" (1); "Depois da Queda o Coice" (1); "Aonde Quer Que Eu Vá" (1); "Cuide Bem do Seu Amor" (1)
Chris Isaak	1985–95	10	"Dancin'" (2); "Wicked Game"*‡ (7); "Somebody's Crying" (1)
Billy Idol	1984–93	10	"Dancing with Myself" (3); "Eye Without a Face" (2); "Cradle of Love"* (3); "Shock to the System" (2)
Bryson Tiller	2016–23	10	Best New Artist; "Don't" (2); "Wild Thoughts"‡ (4); "Could've Been" (1); "Gotta Move On" (2)
Khalid	2017–22	10	Best New Artist*; Push Artist of the Year; "1-800-273-8255" (2); "Silence" (1); "Talk" (2); "Beautiful People" (1); "Eleven" (1); "Numb" (1)
Mýa	1998–03	10	"Ghetto Supastar (That Is What You Are)" (2); "Lady Marmalade"*† (6); "My Love Is Like...Wo" (2)
Talking Heads	1984–87	10	"Burning Down the House" (1); "Once in a Lifetime" (live)(1); "And She Was" (2); "Road to Nowhere"‡ (3); "Wild Wild Life"* (3)
Nirvana	1992–94	10	"Smells Like Teen Spirit"*‡ (4); "In Bloom" (1); "Heart-Shaped Box"*‡ (5)
Jamiroquai	1997	10	"Virtual Insanity"*† (10)
Backstreet Boys	1998–25	10	"Everybody (Backstreet's Back)"* (2); "I Want It That Way"*‡ (4); "The Call" (2); Best Group (2)
FKA Twigs	2015–25	10	"Pendulum" (1); "Two Weeks" (2); M3LL155X (2); "Cellophane" (3); "Tears in the Club" (1); "Eusexua" (1)
Lenny Kravitz	1990–25	10	"Let Love Rule" (1); "Are You Gonna Go My Way"* (2); "Fly Away" (2); "Again" (1); "Low" (1); "Raise Vibration" (1); "Human"* (1); "Honey" (1)

=== Most nominations in a single night ===
Artist	Year	Number of nominations	Nominated work
Lady Gaga	2010	13	"Bad Romance" (10); "Telephone" (3)
Madonna	2026	13	Artist of the Year (for Madonna); Confessions II – The Film (9); "Bring Your Love" (2)
Peter Gabriel	1987	12	"Big Time" (2); "Sledgehammer" (10)
Cardi B	2018	12	Artist of the Year (for Cardi B); "Bartier Cardi" (1); Best New Artist (for Cardi B); "Dinero" (2); "Finesse (Remix)" (5); "Girls Like You" (1); "I Like It" (1)
Ariana Grande	2019	12	"7 Rings" (3); Artist of the Year (for Grande); "Boyfriend" (1); "God Is a Woman" (1); "Rule the World" (1); "Thank U, Next" (5)
Taylor Swift	2019	12	"Me!" (3); "You Need to Calm Down" (9)
Taylor Swift	2024	12	Artist of the Year (for Swift); Best Pop (for Swift); "Fortnight" (9); VMAs Most Iconic Performance (for Swift)
Lady Gaga	2025	12	"Abracadabra" (6); Artist of the Year (for Gaga); "Die with a Smile" (4); Mayhem (1)
A-ha	1986	11	"Take On Me" (8); "The Sun Always Shines on T.V." (3)
Dire Straits	1986	11	"Money for Nothing" (11)
Michael Jackson & Janet Jackson	1995	11	"Scream" (11)
Beyoncé	2016	11	"Formation" (6); "Freedom" (1); "Hold Up" (2); Lemonade (1); "Sorry" (1)
Taylor Swift	2023	11	Artist of the Year (for Swift); "Anti-Hero" (7); The Eras Tour (1); "Karma" (1); Midnights (1)
Post Malone	2024	11	"Fortnight" (9); "I Had Some Help" (2)
Bruno Mars	2025	11	"Apt." (7); "Die with a Smile" (4)
Taylor Swift	2026	11	Artist of the Year (for Swift); "The Fate of Ophelia" (7); The Life of a Showgirl (1); "I Knew It, I Knew You" (1); "Opalite" (1)
R.E.M.	1991	10	"Losing My Religion" (9); Tourfilm (1)
TLC	1995	10	"Waterfalls" (10)
Jamiroquai	1997	10	"Virtual Insanity" (10)
Katy Perry	2011	10	"E.T." (5); "Firework" (3); "Last Friday Night (T.G.I.F.)" (1); "Teenage Dream" (1)
Taylor Swift	2015	10	"Bad Blood" (8); "Blank Space" (2)
Billie Eilish	2019	10	Artist of the Year (for Eilish); "Bad Guy" (5); Best New Artist (for Eilish); "Hostage" (1); Push Artist of the Year (for Eilish); "When the Party's Over" (1)
Kendrick Lamar	2025	10	Artist of the Year (for Lamar); GNX (1); "Luther" (1); "Not Like Us" (7)
Cyndi Lauper	1984	9	"Girls Just Want to Have Fun" (6); "Time After Time" (3)
INXS	1988	9	"Devil Inside" (1); "Need You Tonight / Mediate" (8)
Michael Jackson	1989	9	"Leave Me Alone" (6); "Smooth Criminal" (3)
Madonna	1990	9	"Vogue" (9)
Red Hot Chili Peppers	1992	9	"Give It Away" (6); "Under the Bridge" (3)
Aerosmith	1994	9	"Amazing" (5); "Cryin'" (4)
Green Day	1995	9	"Basket Case" (9)
The Smashing Pumpkins	1996	9	"1979" (1); "Tonight, Tonight" (8)
Madonna	1998	9	"Frozen" (1); "Ray of Light" (8)
Korn	1999	9	"Freak on a Leash" (9)
Ricky Martin	1999	9	"Livin' la Vida Loca" (9)
Fatboy Slim	2001	9	"Weapon of Choice" (9)
Beyoncé	2009	9	"Single Ladies (Put a Ring on It)" (9)
Lady Gaga	2009	9	"Paparazzi" (5); "Poker Face" (4)
Lil Nas X	2019	9	Best New Artist (for Lil Nas X); "Old Town Road (Remix)" (8)
Ariana Grande	2020	9	"Rain on Me" (7); "Stuck with U" (2)
Lady Gaga	2020	9	Artist of the Year (for Gaga); Best Quarantine Performance; "Rain on Me" (7)
Justin Bieber	2021	9	Artist of the Year (for Bieber); "Holy" (1); "Peaches" (4); "Popstar" (2, starring); "Stay" (1)
Sabrina Carpenter	2025	9	Best Pop Artist (for Carpenter); "Manchild" (7); Short n' Sweet (1)
Sabrina Carpenter	2026	9	Artist of the Year (for Carpenter); "Tears" (1); "Bring Your Love" (2); Man's Best Friend (1); "House Tour" (4)
Herbie Hancock	1984	8	"Rockit" (8)
The Police	1984	8	"Every Breath You Take" (8)
David Lee Roth	1985	8	"California Girls" (3); "Just a Gigolo/I Ain't Got Nobody" (5)
George Harrison	1988	8	"Got My Mind Set on You" (2); "When We Was Fab" (6)
U2	1988	8	"I Still Haven't Found What I'm Looking For" (4); "Where the Streets Have No Name" (4)
Aerosmith	1990	8	"Janie's Got a Gun" (8)
En Vogue	1993	8	"Free Your Mind" (8)
Garbage	1998	8	"Push It" (8)
Missy Elliott	2003	8	"Work It" (8)
Green Day	2005	8	"American Idiot" (2); "Boulevard of Broken Dreams" (6)
Eminem	2010	8	"Not Afraid" (8)
Beyoncé	2014	8	"Drunk in Love" (2); "Partition" (2); "Pretty Hurts" (4)
Iggy Azalea	2014	8	"Fancy" (4); "Problem" (4)
Adele	2016	8	"Hello" (7); "Send My Love (To Your New Lover)" (1)
Kendrick Lamar	2017	8	Artist of the Year (for Lamar); "Humble" (7)
The Carters	2018	8	"Apeshit" (8)
Drake	2018	8	Artist of the Year (for Drake); "God's Plan" (5); "In My Feelings" (1); "Walk It Talk It" (1)
Billy Ray Cyrus	2019	8	"Old Town Road (Remix)" (8)
Doja Cat	2022	8	"Get Into It (Yuh)" (2); "I Like You (A Happier Song)" (1); "Vegas" (1); "Woman" (4)
Harry Styles	2022	8	Artist of the Year (for Styles); "As It Was" (5); Harry's House (1); "Late Night Talking" (1)
Jack Harlow	2022	8	Artist of the Year (for Harlow); "First Class" (1); "Industry Baby" (6)
SZA	2023	8	"Kill Bill" (5); "Shirt" (2); SOS (1)
Eminem	2024	8	Artist of the Year (for Eminem); "Houdini" (6); VMAs Most Iconic Performance (for Eminem)
Rosé	2025	8	"Apt." (7); "Toxic Till the End" (1)
Ariana Grande	2026	8	Artist of the Year (for Grande); "Hate That I Made You Love Me" (7)
Lindsey Buckingham	1985	7	"Go Insane" (4); "Slow Dancing" (3)
Don Henley	1985	7	"The Boys of Summer" (7)
Pat Benatar	1986	7	"Sex as a Weapon" (7)
Genesis	1987	7	"Land of Confusion" (7)
Steve Winwood	1987	7	"Higher Love" (7)
U2	1987	7	"With or Without You" (7)
Madonna	1989	7	"Express Yourself" (5); "Like a Prayer" (2)
C+C Music Factory	1991	7	"Gonna Make You Sweat (Everybody Dance Now)" (6); "Things That Make You Go Hmmm..." (1)
Chris Isaak	1991	7	"Wicked Game" (7)
Van Halen	1992	7	"Right Now" (7)
R.E.M.	1994	7	"Everybody Hurts" (7)
Beck	1997	7	"Devils Haircut" (2); "The New Pollution" (5)
Eminem	2000	7	"Forgot About Dre" (1); "The Real Slim Shady" (6)
Shakira	2002	7	"Whenever, Wherever" (7)
Justin Timberlake	2003	7	"Cry Me a River" (5); "Rock Your Body" (2)
Red Hot Chili Peppers	2006	7	"Dani California" (7)
Shakira	2006	7	"Hips Don't Lie" (7)
Beyoncé	2007	7	"Beautiful Liar" (4); Female Artist of the Year; "Irreplaceable" (1); Quadruple Threat of the Year (for Beyoncé)
Justin Timberlake	2007	7	"Let Me Talk to You/My Love" (1); Male Artist of the Year (for Timberlake); Quadruple Threat of the Year (for Timberlake); "SexyBack" (1); "What Goes Around... Comes Around" (3)
Britney Spears	2009	7	"Circus" (5); "Womanizer" (2)
Adele	2011	7	"Rolling in the Deep" (7)
Eminem	2014	7	"Berzerk" (1); "The Monster" (3); "Rap God" (3)
Drake	2016	7	"Hotline Bling" (4); "One Dance" (1); "Work" (2)
Childish Gambino	2018	7	"This Is America" (7)
Halsey	2019	7	Artist of the Year (for Halsey); "Boy with Luv" (4); "Nightmare" (2)
The Weeknd	2020	7	Artist of the Year (for The Weeknd); "Blinding Lights" (6)
BTS	2021	7	Best Group (for BTS); "Butter" (5); "Dynamite" (1);
Giveon	2021	7	Best New Artist (for Giveon); "Heartbreak Anniversary" (2); "Peaches" (4)
Megan Thee Stallion	2021	7	Artist of the Year (for Stallion); "On Me (Remix)" (1); "Thot Shit" (1); "WAP" (4)
Drake	2022	7	Artist of the Year (for Drake); Certified Lover Boy (1); "Wait for U" (2); "Way 2 Sexy" (3)
Kendrick Lamar	2022	7	"Family Ties" (3); "The Heart Part 5" (2); "N95" (2)
Lil Nas X	2022	7	Artist of the Year (for Lil Nas X); "Industry Baby" (6)
Megan Thee Stallion	2024	7	"Boa" (4); "Mamushi" (1); "Wanna Be" (2)
Sabrina Carpenter	2024	7	Artist of the Year (for Carpenter); Best Pop (for Carpenter); "Espresso" (2); "Please Please Please" (3)
Ariana Grande	2024	7	Artist of the Year (for Grande); "The Boy Is Mine" (1); "We Can't Be Friends (Wait for Your Love)" (5)
Ariana Grande	2025	7	Best Pop Artist (for Grande); Brighter Days Ahead (6)
The Weeknd	2025	7	Artist of the Year (for the Weeknd); Hurry Up Tomorrow (album) (1); Hurry Up Tomorrow (film) (2); "Timeless" (3)
Bruno Mars	2026	7	Artist of the Year (for Mars); "I Just Might" (4); The Romantic (1); "Risk It All" (1)
The Cars	1984	6	"You Might Think" (6)
Michael Jackson	1984	6	"Thriller" (6)
ZZ Top	1984	6	"Gimme All Your Lovin'" (1); "Legs" (2); "Sharp Dressed Man" (3)
Bryan Adams	1985	6	"Heaven (version 2)" (1); "Run to You" (5)
ZZ Top	1986	6	"Rough Boy" (6)
Madonna	1987	6	"Open Your Heart" (3); "Papa Don't Preach" (3)
Paul Simon	1987	6	"The Boy in the Bubble" (5); "You Can Call Me Al" (1)
Jody Watley	1989	6	"Real Love" (6)
Steve Winwood	1989	6	"Roll with It" (6)
Paula Abdul	1989	6	"Straight Up" (6)
Paula Abdul	1990	6	"Opposites Attract" (6)
Don Henley	1990	6	"The End of the Innocence" (6)
Sinéad O'Connor	1990	6	"Nothing Compares 2 U" (6)
Deee-Lite	1991	6	"Groove Is in the Heart" (6)
En Vogue	1992	6	"My Lovin' (You're Never Gonna Get It)" (6)
Aerosmith	1993	6	"Livin' on the Edge" (6)
Peter Gabriel	1993	6	"Digging in the Dirt" (3); "Steam" (3)
R.E.M.	1993	6	"Man on the Moon" (6)
Björk	1994	6	"Human Behaviour" (6)
Björk	1996	6	"It's Oh So Quiet" (6)
Alanis Morissette	1996	6	"Ironic" (6)
Will Smith	1998	6	"Gettin' Jiggy wit It" (5); "Just the Two of Us" (1)
Will Smith	1999	6	"Miami" (3); "Wild Wild West" (3)
TLC	1999	6	"No Scrubs" (6)
NSYNC	2000	6	"Bye Bye Bye" (6)
NSYNC	2001	6	"Pop" (6)
Christina Aguilera, Lil' Kim, Mýa, & Pink	2001	6	"Lady Marmalade" (6)
Dido	2001	6	"Stan" (5); "Thank You" (1)
Missy Elliott	2001	6	"Get Ur Freak On" (6)
Missy Elliott	2002	6	"One Minute Man (Remix)" (6)
Eminem	2002	6	"Without Me" (6)
P.O.D.	2002	6	"Alive" (5); "Youth of the Nation" (1)
Johnny Cash	2003	6	"Hurt" (6)
Jay-Z	2004	6	"99 Problems" (6)
Gwen Stefani	2005	6	"Hollaback Girl" (4); "What You Waiting For?" (2)
Missy Elliott	2005	6	"Lose Control" (6)
The Pussycat Dolls	2008	6	"When I Grow Up" (6)
Kanye West	2011	6	"All of the Lights" (4); "Power" (2)
Justin Timberlake	2013	6	"Mirrors" (4); "Suit & Tie" (2)
Macklemore and Ryan Lewis	2013	6	"Can't Hold Us" (4); "Same Love" (1); "Thrift Shop" (1)
Ed Sheeran	2015	6	"Don't" (2); "Thinking Out Loud" (4)
Bruno Mars	2018	6	Artist of the Year (for Mars); "Finesse (Remix)" (5)
Jonas Brothers	2019	6	Artist of the Year (for Jonas Brothers); Best Group (for Jonas Brothers); "Sucker" (4)
Shawn Mendes	2019	6	Artist of the Year (for Mendes); "Señorita" (5)
Taylor Swift	2020	6	"Cardigan" (1); "Lover" (2); "The Man" (3)
Billie Eilish	2020	6	"All the Good Girls Go to Hell" (3); "Everything I Wanted" (2); "Xanny" (1)
Billie Eilish	2021	6	"Happier Than Ever" (1); "Lo Vas a Olvidar" (1); "Therefore I Am" (2); "Your Power" (2)
Cardi B	2021	6	"Rumors" (1); "WAP" (4); "Wild Side" (1)
Doja Cat	2021	6	Artist of the Year (for Doja Cat); "Best Friend" (1); "Kiss Me More" (2); "Need to Know" (1); "You Right" (1)
Lil Nas X	2021	6	"Industry Baby" (1); "Montero (Call Me by Your Name)" (5)
Olivia Rodrigo	2021	6	Artist of the Year (for Rodrigo); Best New Artist (for Rodrigo); "Drivers License" (2); "Good 4 U" (2)
Billie Eilish	2022	6	"Happier Than Ever" (4); Happier Than Ever (1); Happier Than Ever: A Love Letter to Los Angeles (1)
Blackpink	2023	6	Best Group (for Blackpink); Born Pink World Tour (1); "Pink Venom" (4)
Doja Cat	2023	6	Artist of the Year (for Doja Cat); "Attention" (3); "I Like You (A Happier Song)" (1); "Paint the Town Red" (1)
Miley Cyrus	2023	6	Endless Summer Vacation (1); "Flowers" (4); "River" (1)
Nicki Minaj	2023	6	Artist of the Year (for Minaj); "Barbie World" (1); "Love in the Way" (1); "Super Freaky Girl" (3)
Olivia Rodrigo	2023	6	"Vampire" (6)
SZA	2024	6	Artist of the Year (for SZA); "Rich Baby Daddy" (2); "Saturn" (1); "Snooze" (2)
Billie Eilish	2025	6	"Birds of a Feather" (2); "Guess" (4)
Tate McRae	2025	6	Best Pop Artist (for McRae); "Just Keep Watching" (3); "Sports Car" (1); "What I Want" (1)
Billy Idol	1984	5	"Dancing with Myself" (3); "Eye Without a Face" (2)
Eurythmics	1985	5	"Would I Lie to You?" (5)
Madonna	1985	5	"Like a Virgin" (3); "Material Girl" (2)
Tom Petty	1985	5	"Don't Come Around Here No More" (5)
Robert Palmer	1986	5	"Addicted to Love" (5)
Talking Heads	1986	5	"And She Was" (2); "Road to Nowhere" (3)
X	1986	5	"Burning House of Love" (5)
Eurythmics	1987	5	"Missionary Man" (5)
Bruce Springsteen	1988	5	"Tunnel of Love" (5)
MC Hammer	1990	5	"U Can't Touch This" (5)
George Michael	1991	5	"Freedom! '90" (5)
Queensrÿche	1991	5	"Silent Lucidity" (5)
Seal	1991	5	"Crazy" (5)
Pearl Jam	1993	5	"Jeremy" (5)
Beastie Boys	1994	5	"Sabotage" (5)
Nirvana	1994	5	"Heart-Shaped Box" (5)
Weezer	1995	5	"Buddy Holly" (5)
Bone Thugs-n-Harmony	1996	5	"Tha Crossroads" (5)
Coolio	1996	5	"1, 2, 3, 4 (Sumpin' New)" (2); "Gangsta's Paradise" (3)
Foo Fighters	1996	5	"Big Me" (5)
Nine Inch Nails	1997	5	"The Perfect Drug" (5)
Busta Rhymes	1999	5	"Gimme Some More" (1); "What's It Gonna Be?!" (4)
Jennifer Lopez	1999	5	Best Artist Website; "If You Had My Love" (4)
Lauryn Hill	1999	5	"Doo Wop (That Thing)" (5)
Christina Aguilera	2000	5	"What a Girl Wants" (5)
Metallica	2000	5	"I Disappear" (5)
Red Hot Chili Peppers	2000	5	"Californication" (5)
Sisqó	2000	5	"Thong Song" (4); "Thong Song" (Remix)(1)
Destiny's Child	2001	5	"Independent Women Part I" (2); "Survivor" (3)
Eminem	2001	5	"Stan" (5)
U2	2001	5	"Beautiful Day" (1); "Elevation (Tomb Raider Mix)" (4)
Enrique Iglesias	2002	5	"Escape" (1); "Hero" (4)
50 Cent	2003	5	"In da Club" (5)
Eminem	2003	5	"Lose Yourself" (5)
Beyoncé	2004	5	"Me, Myself and I" (1); "Naughty Girl" (4)
No Doubt	2004	5	"It's My Life" (5)
OutKast	2004	5	"Hey Ya!" (5)
Usher	2004	5	"Burn" (1); "Yeah!" (4)
My Chemical Romance	2005	5	"Helena" (5)
U2	2005	5	"Vertigo" (5)
Madonna	2006	5	"Hung Up" (5)
Panic! at the Disco	2006	5	"I Write Sins Not Tragedies" (5)
Kanye West	2007	5	Male Artist of the Year (for West); Quadruple Threat of the Year (for West); "Stronger" (3)
Chris Brown	2008	5	"Forever" (3); "Kiss Kiss" (1); "With You" (1)
Katy Perry	2008	5	"I Kissed a Girl" (5)
Beyoncé	2010	5	"Video Phone (Extended Remix)" (5)
B.o.B	2010	5	"Airplanes" (4); "Nothin' on You" (1)
Drake	2012	5	"HYFR" (1); "Take Care" (4)
Rihanna	2012	5	"We Found Love" (3); "Where Have You Been" (2)
Charli XCX	2014	5	"Boom Clap" (1); "Fancy" (4)
Beyoncé	2015	5	"7/11" (5)
Mark Ronson	2015	5	"Uptown Funk" (5)
Ariana Grande	2016	5	"Into You" (4); "Let Me Love You" (1)
Rihanna	2016	5	"This Is What You Came For" (3); "Work" (2)
DJ Khaled	2017	5	"I'm the One" (1); "Wild Thoughts" (4)
Katy Perry	2017	5	"Bon Appétit" (1); "Chained to the Rhythm" (3); "Feels" (1)
The Weeknd	2017	5	Artist of the Year (for The Weeknd); "Reminder" (4)
Ariana Grande	2018	5	Artist of the Year (for Grande); "No Tears Left to Cry" (4)
Camila Cabello	2018	5	Artist of the Year (for Cabello); "Havana" (4)
Camila Cabello	2019	5	"Señorita" (5)
BTS	2019	5	Best Group (for BTS); "Boy with Luv" (4)
Cardi B	2019	5	Artist of the Year (for Cardi B); "Money" (1); "Please Me" (1); "Taki Taki" (1); "Wish Wish" (1)
J Balvin	2019	5	"Con Altura" (3); "I Can't Get Enough" (1); "Say My Name" (1)
DaBaby	2020	5	Artist of the Year (for DaBaby); "Bop" (2); "My Oh My" (1); "Rockstar" (1)
Drake	2020	5	"Life Is Good" (3); "Popstar" (1); "Toosie Slide" (1)
Megan Thee Stallion	2020	5	Artist of the Year (for Stallion); "Savage" (2); "Savage (Remix) (1)"; "WAP" (1)
Roddy Ricch	2020	5	Best New Artist (for Ricch); "The Box" (2); "Rockstar" (1); "The Woo" (1)
Dua Lipa	2020	5	"Break My Heart" (1); "Don't Start Now" (1); "Physical" (3)
Dua Lipa	2021	5	"Levitating" (2); "Prisoner" (2); "Un Dia (One Day)" (1)
Drake	2021	5	"Laugh Now Cry Later" (2); "Popstar" (2); "What's Next" (1)
BTS	2022	5	Best Group (for BTS); Best Metaverse Performance; "My Universe" (1); "Permission to Dance" (1); "Yet to Come (The Most Beautiful Moment)" (1)
Dua Lipa	2022	5	"Cold Heart (Pnau remix)" (2); "Sweetest Pie" (3)
Ed Sheeran	2022	5	Artist of the Year (for Sheeran); "Bam Bam" (1); "Shivers" (3)
Future	2022	5	"Wait for U" (2); "Way 2 Sexy" (3)
Lizzo	2022	5	Artist of the Year (for Lizzo); "About Damn Time" (4)
Taylor Swift	2022	5	All Too Well: The Short Film (5)
The Weeknd	2022	5	"La Fama" (1); "One Right Now" (1); "Out of Time" (1); "Take My Breath" (1); "Tears in the Club" (1)
Sam Smith & Kim Petras	2023	5	"Unholy" (5)
Charli XCX	2025	5	Best Pop Artist (for Charli XCX); "Guess" (4)
Ella Langley	2026	5	"Choosin' Texas" (4); Dandelion (1)
PinkPantheress & Zara Larsson	2026	5	"Stateside + Zara Larsson" (5)

=== Most nominations for a single video ===
Artist(s)	Year	Number of nominations	Music video
Dire Straits	1986	11	"Money for Nothing"
Michael Jackson & Janet Jackson	1995	11	"Scream"
Peter Gabriel	1987	10	"Sledgehammer"
TLC	1995	10	"Waterfalls"
Jamiroquai	1997	10	"Virtual Insanity"
Lady Gaga	2010	10	"Bad Romance"
Madonna	1990	9	"Vogue"
R.E.M.	1991	9	"Losing My Religion"
Green Day	1995	9	"Basket Case"
Korn	1999	9	"Freak on a Leash"
Ricky Martin	1999	9	"Livin' la Vida Loca"
Fatboy Slim	2001	9	"Weapon of Choice"
Beyoncé	2009	9	"Single Ladies (Put a Ring on It)"
Taylor Swift	2019	9	"You Need to Calm Down"
Taylor Swift (featuring Post Malone)	2024	9	"Fortnight"
Madonna	2026	9	Confessions II – The Film
Herbie Hancock	1984	8	"Rockit"
The Police	1984	8	"Every Breath You Take"
A-ha	1986	8	"Take On Me"
INXS	1988	8	"Need You Tonight / Mediate"
Aerosmith	1990	8	"Janie's Got a Gun"
En Vogue	1993	8	"Free Your Mind"
The Smashing Pumpkins	1996	8	"Tonight, Tonight"
Madonna	1998	8	"Ray of Light"
Garbage	1998	8	"Push It"
Missy Elliott	2003	8	"Work It"
Eminem	2010	8	"Not Afraid"
Taylor Swift (featuring Kendrick Lamar)	2015	8	"Bad Blood"
The Carters	2018	8	"Apeshit"
Lil Nas X (featuring Billy Ray Cyrus)	2019	8	"Old Town Road (Remix)"
Don Henley	1985	7	"The Boys of Summer"
Pat Benatar	1986	7	"Sex as a Weapon"
Genesis	1987	7	"Land of Confusion"
Steve Winwood	1987	7	"Higher Love"
U2	1987	7	"With or Without You"
Chris Isaak	1991	7	"Wicked Game"
Van Halen	1992	7	"Right Now"
R.E.M.	1994	7	"Everybody Hurts"
Shakira	2002	7	"Whenever, Wherever"
Shakira	2006	7	"Hips Don't Lie"
Red Hot Chili Peppers	2006	7	"Dani California"
Adele	2011	7	"Rolling in the Deep"
Adele	2016	7	"Hello"
Kendrick Lamar	2017	7	"Humble."
Childish Gambino	2018	7	"This Is America"
Lady Gaga & Ariana Grande	2020	7	"Rain on Me"
Taylor Swift	2023	7	"Anti-Hero"
Rosé & Bruno Mars	2025	7	"Apt."
Kendrick Lamar	2025	7	"Not Like Us"
Sabrina Carpenter	2025	7	"Manchild"
Taylor Swift	2026	7	"The Fate of Ophelia"
Ariana Grande	2026	7	"Hate That I Made You Love Me"
The Cars	1984	6	"You Might Think"
Cyndi Lauper	1984	6	"Girls Just Want to Have Fun"
Michael Jackson	1984	6	"Thriller"
ZZ Top	1986	6	"Rough Boy"
George Harrison	1988	6	"When We Was Fab"
Michael Jackson	1989	6	"Leave Me Alone"
Jody Watley	1989	6	"Real Love"
Steve Winwood	1989	6	"Roll with It"
Paula Abdul	1989	6	"Straight Up"
Paula Abdul	1990	6	"Opposites Attract"
Don Henley	1990	6	"The End of the Innocence"
Sinéad O'Connor	1990	6	"Nothing Compares 2 U"
C+C Music Factory	1991	6	"Gonna Make You Sweat (Everybody Dance Now)"
Deee-Lite	1991	6	"Groove Is in the Heart"
Red Hot Chili Peppers	1992	6	"Give It Away"
En Vogue	1992	6	"My Lovin' (You're Never Gonna Get It)"
Aerosmith	1993	6	"Livin' on the Edge"
R.E.M.	1993	6	"Man on the Moon"
Björk	1994	6	"Human Behaviour"
Björk	1996	6	"It's Oh So Quiet"
Alanis Morissette	1996	6	"Ironic"
TLC	1999	6	"No Scrubs"
Eminem	2000	6	"The Real Slim Shady"
NSYNC	2000	6	"Bye Bye Bye"
NSYNC	2001	6	"Pop"
Christina Aguilera, Lil' Kim, Mýa and Pink (featuring Missy Elliott)	2001	6	"Lady Marmalade"
Missy Elliott	2001	6	"Get Ur Freak On"
Missy Elliott	2002	6	"One Minute Man (Remix)"
Eminem	2002	6	"Without Me"
Johnny Cash	2003	6	"Hurt"
Jay-Z	2004	6	"99 Problems"
Green Day	2005	6	"Boulevard of Broken Dreams"
Missy Elliott	2005	6	"Lose Control"
The Pussycat Dolls	2008	6	"When I Grow Up"
Beyoncé	2016	6	"Formation"
The Weeknd	2020	6	"Blinding Lights"
Lil Nas X & Jack Harlow	2022	6	"Industry Baby"
Olivia Rodrigo	2023	6	"Vampire"
Eminem	2024	6	"Houdini"
Ariana Grande	2025	6	Brighter Days Ahead
Lady Gaga	2025	6	"Abracadabra"
Bryan Adams	1985	5	"Run to You"
David Lee Roth	1985	5	"Just a Gigolo/I Ain't Got Nobody"
Eurythmics	1985	5	"Would I Lie to You?"
Tom Petty	1985	5	"Don't Come Around Here No More"
Robert Palmer	1986	5	"Addicted to Love"
X	1986	5	"Burning House of Love"
Eurythmics	1987	5	"Missionary Man"
Paul Simon	1987	5	"The Boy in the Bubble"
Bruce Springsteen	1988	5	"Tunnel of Love"
Madonna	1989	5	"Express Yourself"
MC Hammer	1990	5	"U Can't Touch This"
George Michael	1991	5	"Freedom! '90"
Queensrÿche	1991	5	"Silent Lucidity"
Seal	1991	5	"Crazy"
Pearl Jam	1993	5	"Jeremy"
Aerosmith	1994	5	"Amazing"
Beastie Boys	1994	5	"Sabotage"
Nirvana	1994	5	"Heart-Shaped Box"
Weezer	1995	5	"Buddy Holly"
Bone Thugs-n-Harmony	1996	5	"Tha Crossroads"
Foo Fighters	1996	5	"Big Me"
Beck	1997	5	"The New Pollution"
Nine Inch Nails	1997	5	"The Perfect Drug"
Will Smith	1998	5	"Gettin' Jiggy wit It"
Lauryn Hill	1999	5	"Doo Wop (That Thing)"
Christina Aguilera	2000	5	"What a Girl Wants"
Metallica	2000	5	"I Disappear"
Red Hot Chili Peppers	2000	5	"Californication"
Eminem (featuring Dido)	2001	5	"Stan"
P.O.D.	2002	5	"Alive"
50 Cent	2003	5	"In da Club"
Eminem	2003	5	"Lose Yourself"
Justin Timberlake	2003	5	"Cry Me a River"
No Doubt	2004	5	"It's My Life"
OutKast	2004	5	"Hey Ya!"
My Chemical Romance	2005	5	"Helena"
U2	2005	5	"Vertigo"
Madonna	2006	5	"Hung Up"
Panic! at the Disco	2006	5	"I Write Sins Not Tragedies"
Katy Perry	2008	5	"I Kissed a Girl"
Britney Spears	2009	5	"Circus"
Lady Gaga	2009	5	"Paparazzi"
Beyoncé	2010	5	"Video Phone (Extended Remix)"
Katy Perry	2011	5	"E.T."
Beyoncé	2015	5	"7/11"
Mark Ronson (featuring Bruno Mars)	2015	5	"Uptown Funk"
Bruno Mars (featuring Cardi B)	2018	5	"Finesse (Remix)"
Drake	2018	5	"God's Plan"
Ariana Grande	2019	5	"Thank U, Next"
Billie Eilish	2019	5	"Bad Guy"
Shawn Mendes & Camila Cabello	2019	5	"Señorita"
BTS	2021	5	"Butter"
Lil Nas X	2021	5	"Montero (Call Me by Your Name)"
Harry Styles	2022	5	"As It Was"
Taylor Swift	2022	5	All Too Well: The Short Film
Sam Smith & Kim Petras	2023	5	"Unholy"
SZA	2023	5	"Kill Bill"
Ariana Grande	2024	5	"We Can't Be Friends (Wait for Your Love)"
PinkPantheress & Zara Larsson	2026	5	"Stateside + Zara Larsson"

== Performances ==
=== Pre-Show ===
Year	Performers
1995	Silverchair
1996	Beck • No Doubt
1997	Foo Fighters • The Mighty Mighty Bosstones
1998	Usher • Barenaked Ladies
1999	Smash Mouth • Blink-182
2000	Papa Roach
2001	Alien Ant Farm • City High (feat. Eve)
2002	Avril Lavigne • Ludacris (feat. I-20 & Shawnna)
2003	Sean Paul • Black Eyed Peas
2004	Jadakiss (feat Anthony Hamilton) • Ashlee Simpson • New Found Glory
2005	Mike Jones (feat. Slim Thug & Paul Wall) • Rihanna • Fall Out Boy
2006	Fergie • My Chemical Romance
2007	Nicole Scherzinger (feat. Lil Wayne)
2008	Dance-off Performance: Fanny Pak vs. Kaba Modern
2009	—N/a
2010	Nicki Minaj (feat. will.i.am)
2011	Cobra Starship (feat. Sabi)
2012	Demi Lovato
2013	Austin Mahone • Ariana Grande
2014	Fifth Harmony • Charli XCX
2015	Walk The Moon • Todrick Hall • Nick Jonas
2016	Alessia Cara (feat. Troye Sivan) • Jidenna • Lukas Graham
2017	Cardi B • Bleachers • Khalid
2018	Bazzi • Bryce Vine • Backstreet Boys
2019	Ava Max • CNCO • Megan Thee Stallion
2020	Jack Harlow • Tate McRae • Chloe x Halle • Lewis Capaldi • Machine Gun Kelley (feat. Blackbear & Travis Barker)
2021	Polo G • Kim Petras • Swedish House Mafia
2022	Saucy Santana • Yung Gravy • Dove Cameron
2023	NLE Choppa • Sabrina Carpenter
2024	Le Sserafim
2025	KATSEYE
2026	—N/a

=== Main Show ===
Year	Performers (chronologically)
1984	Rod Stewart; Madonna; Huey Lewis and the News; David Bowie; Tina Turner; ZZ Top; Ray Parker Jr.
1985	Eurythmics; David Ruffin & Eddie Kendrick & Hall & Oates; Tears for Fears; John Cougar Mellencamp; Pat Benatar; Sting; Eddie Murphy
1986	Robert Palmer; The Hooters; The Monkees; 'Til Tuesday; INXS; Van Halen; Mr. Mister; Simply Red; Whitney Houston; Pet Shop Boys; Tina Turner; Genesis
1987	Los Lobos; Bryan Adams; The Bangles; Bon Jovi; Crowded House; Madonna; Whitesnake; Whitney Houston; The Cars; David Bowie; Prince; Cyndi Lauper; Run-D.M.C. (feat. Steven Tyler & Joe Perry)
1988	Rod Stewart; Jody Watley; Aerosmith; Elton John; Depeche Mode; Crowded House; Cher; The Fat Boys (feat. Chubby Checker); Guns N' Roses; INXS
1989	Madonna; Bobby Brown; Def Leppard; Tone-Loc; The Cult; Paula Abdul; Jon Bon Jovi & Richie Sambora; The Cure; Cher; The Rolling Stones; Axl Rose & Tom Petty and the Heartbreakers
1990	Janet Jackson; Mötley Crüe; MC Hammer; INXS; Sinéad O'Connor; New Edition (feat. Bobby Brown); Faith No More; Phil Collins; 2 Live Crew; World Party; Aerosmith; Madonna
1991	Van Halen; C+C Music Factory; Poison; Mariah Carey; EMF; Paula Abdul; Queensrÿche; LL Cool J; Metallica; Don Henley; Guns N' Roses; Prince and the New Power Generation
1992	The Black Crowes; Bobby Brown; U2 & Dana Carvey; Def Leppard; Nirvana; Elton John; Pearl Jam; Red Hot Chili Peppers; Michael Jackson; Bryan Adams; En Vogue; Eric Clapton; Guns N' Roses & Elton John
1993	Madonna; Lenny Kravitz (feat. John Paul Jones); Sting; Soul Asylum & Peter Buck & Victoria Williams; Aerosmith; Naughty by Nature; R.E.M.; Spin Doctors; Pearl Jam; The Edge; Janet Jackson
1994	Aerosmith; Boyz II Men; The Smashing Pumpkins; The Rolling Stones; Green Day; Beastie Boys; Alexandrov Red Army Ensemble & Leningrad Cowboys; Salt-n-Pepa; Tom Petty and the Heartbreakers; Snoop Doggy Dogg; Stone Temple Pilots; Bruce Springsteen
1995	Michael Jackson (feat. Slash); Live; TLC; R.E.M.; Red Hot Chili Peppers; Bon Jovi, Alanis Morissette; Hootie & the Blowfish; Hole; Green Day; White Zombie
1996	The Smashing Pumpkins; The Fugees (feat. Nas); Metallica; LL Cool J; Neil Young; Hootie & the Blowfish; Alanis Morissette; Bush; The Cranberries; Oasis; Bone Thugs-n-Harmony; Kiss
1997	Puff Daddy (feat. Faith Evans, 112, Mase & Sting); Jewel; The Prodigy; The Wallflowers (feat. Bruce Springsteen); Lil' Kim & Da Brat & Missy Elliott & Lisa "Left-Eye" Lopes & Angie Martinez; U2; Beck; Spice Girls; Jamiroquai; Marilyn Manson
1998	Madonna; Pras (feat. Ol' Dirty Bastard, Mýa, Wyclef Jean & Canibus); Hole; Master P (feat. Silkk Tha Shocker, Mystikal & Mia X); Backstreet Boys; Beastie Boys; Brandy & Monica; Dave Matthews Band; Marilyn Manson; Brian Setzer Orchestra
1999	Kid Rock (feat. Run-DMC, Steven Tyler, Joe Perry & Joe C.); Lauryn Hill; Backstreet Boys; Ricky Martin; Nine Inch Nails; TLC; Fatboy Slim; Jay-Z (feat. DJ Clue & Amil); Britney Spears & 'N Sync; Eminem & Dr. Dre & Snoop Dogg
2000	Janet Jackson; Rage Against the Machine; Sisqo (feat. Dru Hill); Britney Spears; Eminem; Red Hot Chili Peppers; 'N Sync; Nelly; Christina Aguilera (feat. Fred Durst); Blink-182
2001	Jennifer Lopez (feat. Ja Rule); Linkin Park & the X-Ecutioners; Alicia Keys; 'N Sync (feat. Michael Jackson); Daphne Aguilera; Jay-Z; Staind; Missy Elliott (feat. Nelly Furtado; Ludacris & Trina); U2; Britney Spears
2002	Bruce Springsteen & the E Street Band; Pink; Ja Rule & Ashanti & Nas; Shakira; Eminem; P. Diddy (feat. Busta Rhymes, Ginuwine, Pharrell & Usher); Sheryl Crow; The Hives; The Vines; Justin Timberlake (feat. Clipse); Guns N' Roses
2003	Madonna (feat. Britney Spears, Christina Aguilera & Missy Elliott); Good Charlotte; Christina Aguilera (feat. Redman & Dave Navarro); 50 Cent (feat. Snoop Dogg); Mary J. Blige (feat. Method Man & 50 Cent); Coldplay; Beyoncé (feat. Jay Z); Metallica
2004	Usher; Jet; Hoobastank; Yellowcard; Kanye West (feat. Chaka Khan & Syleena Johnson); Lil Jon & the East Side Boyz; Ying Yang Twins; Petey Pablo; Terror Squad (feat. Fat Joe); Jessica Simpson; Nelly (feat. Christina Aguilera); Alicia Keys (feat. Lenny Kravitz & Stevie Wonder); The Polyphonic Spree; OutKast
2005	Green Day; Ludacris (feat. Bobby Valentino); MC Hammer; Shakira (feat. Alejandro Sanz); R. Kelly; The Killers; P. Diddy & Snoop Dogg; Don Omar; Tego Calderón; Daddy Yankee; Coldplay; Kanye West (feat. Jamie Foxx); Mariah Carey (feat. Jadakiss & Jermaine Dupri); 50 Cent (feat. Mobb Deep & Tony Yayo); My Chemical Romance; Kelly Clarkson
2006	Justin Timberlake (feat. Timbaland); Shakira & Wyclef Jean; Ludacris (feat. Pharrell & Pussycat Dolls); OK Go; The All-American Rejects; Beyoncé; T.I. (feat. Young Dro); Panic! at the Disco; Busta Rhymes; Missy Elliott; Christina Aguilera; Tenacious D; The Killers
2007	Britney Spears; Chris Brown (feat. Rihanna); Linkin Park; Alicia Keys; Timbaland (feat. Nelly Furtado, Sebastian, Keri Hilson & Justin Timberlake)
2008	Rihanna; Jonas Brothers; Lil Wayne (feat. Leona Lewis & T-Pain); Paramore; Pink; T.I. (feat. Rihanna); Christina Aguilera; Kanye West; Katy Perry; Kid Rock (feat. Lil Wayne); The Ting Tings; LL Cool J; Lupe Fiasco
2009	Janet Jackson & This Is It back-up dancers; Katy Perry & Joe Perry; Taylor Swift; Lady Gaga; Green Day; Beyoncé; Muse; Pink; Jay-Z & Alicia Keys
2010	Eminem (feat. Rihanna); Justin Bieber; Usher; Florence and the Machine; Taylor Swift; Drake (feat. Mary J. Blige & Swizz Beatz); B.o.B & Paramore (feat. Bruno Mars); Linkin Park; Kanye West
2011	Lady Gaga (feat. Brian May); Jay Z & Kanye West; Pitbull (feat. Ne-Yo & Nayer); Adele; Chris Brown; Beyoncé; Young the Giant; Bruno Mars; Lil Wayne
2012	Rihanna (feat. ASAP Rocky & Calvin Harris); Pink; Frank Ocean; One Direction; Lil Wayne & 2 Chainz; Green Day; Alicia Keys (feat. Nicki Minaj); Taylor Swift
2013	Lady Gaga; Miley Cyrus & Robin Thicke (feat. 2 Chainz & Kendrick Lamar); Kanye West; Justin Timberlake (feat. 'N Sync); Macklemore & Ryan Lewis (feat. Mary Lambert & Jennifer Hudson); Drake; Bruno Mars; Katy Perry
2014	Ariana Grande & Nicki Minaj & Jessie J; Taylor Swift; Sam Smith; Usher (feat. Nicki Minaj); Iggy Azalea (feat. Rita Ora); 5 Seconds of Summer; Maroon 5; Beyoncé
2015	Nicki Minaj & Taylor Swift; Macklemore & Ryan Lewis (feat. Eric Nally, Melle Mel, Kool Moe Dee, Grandmaster Caz); The Weeknd; Demi Lovato (feat. Iggy Azalea); Justin Bieber; Tori Kelly; Pharrell Williams; Twenty One Pilots & ASAP Rocky; Miley Cyrus
2016	Rihanna; Ariana Grande (feat. Nicki Minaj); Future; Nick Jonas (feat. Ty Dolla Sign); Beyoncé; Britney Spears (feat. G-Eazy); The Chainsmokers (feat. Halsey)
2017	Kendrick Lamar; Ed Sheeran (feat. Lil Uzi Vert); Julia Michaels; Shawn Mendes; Lorde; Fifth Harmony (feat. Gucci Mane); Miley Cyrus; Demi Lovato; Pink; Kyle; Alessia Cara; Logic (feat. Khalid & Alessia Cara); Thirty Seconds to Mars (feat. Travis Scott); DNCE & Rod Stewart; Katy Perry (feat. Nicki Minaj)
2018	Shawn Mendes; Logic (feat. Ryan Tedder); Panic! at the Disco; Nicki Minaj; Jennifer Lopez (feat. DJ Khaled & Ja Rule); Ariana Grande; Travis Scott (feat. James Blake); Maluma; Post Malone (feat. 21 Savage & Aerosmith)
2019	Taylor Swift; Shawn Mendes; Lizzo; Jonas Brothers; Lil Nas X; Missy Elliott; Shawn Mendes & Camila Cabello; Miley Cyrus; Rosalía (feat. Ozuna); H.E.R.; Normani; Big Sean (feat. A$AP Ferg); AJ Mitchell; Bad Bunny & J Balvin; Queen Latifah, Naughty By Nature, Redman, Fetty Wap & Wyclef Jean
2020	The Weeknd; DaBaby; Miley Cyrus; Maluma; BTS; Lady Gaga & Ariana Grande; Doja Cat; Keke Palmer; CNCO; Black Eyed Peas, Nicky Jam & Tyga
2021	Justin Bieber & the Kid Laroi; Olivia Rodrigo; Kacey Musgraves; Twenty One Pilots; Ed Sheeran; Lil Nas X & Jack Harlow; Camila Cabello; Shawn Mendes & Tainy; Doja Cat; Chlöe; Normani; Ozuna; Foo Fighters; Alicia Keys (feat. Swae Lee); Busta Rhymes & Spliff Star; Machine Gun Kelly & Travis Barker
2022	Jack Harlow & Fergie; Lizzo; Blackpink; J Balvin & Ryan Castro; Khalid & Marshmello; Nicki Minaj; Eminem & Snoop Dogg; Red Hot Chili Peppers; Anitta; Kane Brown; Måneskin; Bad Bunny; Panic! at the Disco
2023	Lil Wayne; Olivia Rodrigo; Cardi B & Megan Thee Stallion; Demi Lovato; Anitta; Doja Cat; Shakira; Nicki Minaj; Karol G; Diddy; Peso Pluma; Stray Kids; Metro Boomin (feat. Future, A Boogie wit da Hoodie, Swae Lee & Nav); Fall Out Boy; Tomorrow X Together & Anitta; Måneskin; Kelsea Ballerini
2024	Eminem; Karol G; Lisa; Shawn Mendes; Sabrina Carpenter; Anitta; Katy Perry; Chappell Roan; Megan Thee Stallion; Benson Boone; Rauw Alejandro; Halsey; Lenny Kravitz; Camila Cabello; GloRilla; LL Cool J
2025	Busta Rhymes; Ricky Martin; Alex Warren; DJ Snake & J Balvin; Sabrina Carpenter; Sombr; Mariah Carey; Conan Gray; Doja Cat; Jelly Roll; Post Malone; Tate McRae; Lady Gaga
2026	Gener8ion & Yung Lean; Lisa; Madonna; Raye; Shaboozey & Gunna; Sienna Spiro

== See also ==
- MTV Asia Awards
- MTV Europe Music Awards
- MTV Video Music Awards Japan
- MTV Video Music Brasil
- MTV 500
