= List of street and vernacular dances =

Below is a list of vernacular/street dances, varying from traditional to modern electronic styles.

Afro-American vernacular dance

- Black Bottom
- Blues dance
- Boogie-woogie
- Boogaloo (funk dance)
- Breakaway
- Cabbage Patch
- Cakewalk
- Charleston
- Chicago stepping
- Litefeet
- Rock n roll
- Monkey
- Swing (a.k.a. Jitterbug)
  - Shag
  - Lindy hop
  - Big Apple
- Stepping
- Tap dance
- Texas Tommy

Afro-Caribbean vernacular dance

- Flexing
- Dancehall
  - Skanking
- Merengue
- Rumba
- Bachata
  - Urban Bachata/Sensual
- Salsa
  - Salsa-ragga
  - Salsaton
- Reggaeton
- Zouk

European Vernacular Dance

- Clogging
- Northern soul (British)

European-American Vernacular Dance

- Swing (a.k.a. Jitterbug)
  - Balboa

Hip-hop & Funk styles

- Bankhead Bounce
- Bobble head dance
- Boogaloo (funk dance)
- Bounce
- Breakdance
- Crip Walk
- The Dougie
- Jerkin'
- Memphis Jookin'
- Krumping
- Locking
- Robot dance
- Turfing
- Popping
  - Boogaloo (funk dance)
  - Gliding, sliding, and floating
  - Electric boogaloo
  - Strobing
  - Ticking
  - Tutting
  - Waving
- Snap dance
- The Humpty Dance
- Uprock = Rock Dance

House & Disco dance

- Footwork/Juke
- Electro Flogger
- Hustle
- Jacking
- Lofting
- Electro Dance
- The Perculator
- Vogue
- Waacking

Rock, Ska & Punk

- Air guitar
- Hardcore
- Headbanging
- Moshing
- Pogo
- Punking
- Sharpie dance

South American vernacular dance

- Lambada
  - Grinding
- Capoeira
- Samba
- Tango

Techno, Trance, Hard & Rave dance

- Glowsticking
- Liquid and digits
- Melbourne Shuffle
- Hakken
- Hardstep
- Industrial dance
- Jumpstyle
- Para Para
- Free Step
- X-Outing

West African vernacular dance

- Punta

Asian vernacular dance

- Square dancing

== See also ==
- List of ethnic, regional, and folk dances sorted by origin
