= Punking =

American dance style developed in the 1970s

Punking is a street dance from the underground gay community of Los Angeles that was developed in the early 1970s.

== Influences and history ==
The dance borrows inspiration from silent films, movies, film stars and starlets (such as Greta Garbo, Fred Astaire, etc.), musicals, Hollywood, dramas, cartoons, the photography book The Four Fabulous Faces, and dancers' own personal life. The dance is characterized by acting/behavior, sharp striking movements and posing, extreme usage of space, athleticism, intricate musicality, and complete dominance of the music. The name Punking derives from the urban slang term 'punk' which was a derogatory term for gay men. The term punking was coined by the DJ at Ginos II and punking originator Michael Angelo Harris, who used the word punk as a form of empowerment to name what he and the collective group of men that were developing and creating in underground gay clubs such as Paradise Ballroom, Ginos, and Ginos II. Once the dance developed further, the originators used the word 'whack' (to strike with force or a sharp blow) borrowed from the onomatapoeia of the 1960s TV series Batman, to describe how they were executing their movement. The terms "punk", "pose", and "whack" became their way of loosely explaining the dance to outsiders who were interested in the dance they were developing.

Throughout the early development of the style, it is suspected to originate from posing, which was simply freezing in a pose to the music from the early 1970s. A group of men used posing to develop the dance into what would be referred to as punking and then whacking. These men were Andrew Frank, Arthur Goff, Tinker Toy, Billy Starr Estrada, Lonny Carbajal, Viktor Manoel, Tommy Mitchell, Faye Raye, and Kenny "China Doll", with Michael Angelo Harris serving as the innovative DJ for the art form and movement. Through their exposure of the style in various clubs and contests throughout LA, many famous street dancers and choreographers would be introduced to the underground style, such as original locker and star of the TV series What's Happening Fred Berry Mr. Penguin or Rerun, director/choreographer/singer Toni Basil, original locker and star of NBC's The Big Show, Breakin', Adolfo "Shabba Doo" Quinones; locking pioneer, featured dancer of The Big Show, and Breakin' Movies, Ana "Lollipop" Sanchez, jazz dancer Dallace Ziegler, Choreographer Bill Goodson, and many others, publicizing the dance throughout numerous high-profile TV, stage, and screen productions and appearances. As the dance grew popular among those outside of the collective and gay clubs, the dance began to be referred to exclusively as whacking to avoid the negative connotation associated with the word punk. Adolfo "Shabba Doo" Quinones was one of the "straight" dancers who learned from the creators of the style and created his own style based on locking, soul dance, salsa, and martial arts, adopting the character of the debonair male lead and machismo behavior often portrayed in films. His style in particular became very popular among straight men, exposing the dance to an even wider audience.

Many of the originators of punking went on to publicize the dance through their work and TV appearances on programs such as the 1970s TV show Soul Train and The Big Show, as well as with artists such as Toni Basil, Grace Jones, Diana Ross, and David Bowie, the original style of punking has faded from public view due to deaths of several of its originators, and has evolved into whacking. The only known remaining originator of punking is dancer/choreographer Viktor Manoel, who continues to teach and practice the style.

== Characteristics ==
Punking is very action-orientated, involving constant momentum, high energy, and emotional performance in a style similar to silent film, which differs from the fashion-inspired dance voguing, which is from New York City. The style consists of three main elements referred as to punking, posing, and whacking. Punking is considered the essence and storytelling element of the dance. According to Michael Angelo, since society referred to them as "punks", the dance that was being developed should be referred to as "Punk-ing". Posing was simply a frozen behavior similar to a screenshot from a movie. Lastly, Whacking, which simply means to strike with force, was the sharp striking actions that were made with their arms and various parts of the body. Collectively, these elements make up the dance punking. The dance also borrows inspiration from many of its originators own personal influences, such as The Fabulous Four Faces, silent film, Musicals, gymnastics, ice skating, Bugs Bunny cartoons, Bruce Lee, Mexican Folkloric Ballet, and many other sources. Other key components are travel and constant movement, fluidity, footwork, extreme usage of space and movement, jumps, leaps, turns, runs, very little to no floor, and dissecting musicality.

According to the book Writing Dance in The Age of Postmodernism, Basil states that although the creators of punking knew locking, they were interested in creating their own style by taking elements of locking like freeze frame points and wrist rolls, then transforming them into a gesture that moved decoratively around the head and incorporated campy poses that referenced movie stars and poses from Vogue magazine.

== Soundtrack ==
During the early development and evolution of the style, one of the important factors that gave the dance its aesthetic was its distinctive music. Created by Michael Angelo Harris, Harris would often take music of the time, ranging from soul, disco, post punk, and more, and refashion them by speeding up the RPM of the instrumental breaks of the song to create a dance soundtrack. This distinct way of DJing was a covert way of ensuring that some of the famous choreographers at the time who came to the clubs to see what they were developing were not able to really see what the dancers were doing. This sped up music also gave the dance its distinct jump cut rhythm, but challenged the dancers to conquer or dominate the sound, instead of the sound dominating the dancer which gave the dance its distinctive edge. Harris was noted for using his platform to not only protect the collective group of men and what they were creating, as they were purely underground and primarily gay, but also for becoming one of the most innovative DJs to emerge from Hollywood's community. After Gino's and Gino's II, Harris would go on to host the midnight show at Peanuts which included many notable performers from Hollywood's gay scene, including Viktor Manoel, who was known as the androgynous "Manoel" and would lip-sync and perform at the midnight show. Peanuts become one of the hottest clubs in LA throughout the 80's especially among famous performers and singers.

After the era of Gino's, Ginos II, and Peanuts, many of the notable architects of the artform died from various causes during the height of the AIDS epidemic of the 80's and 90's. It is noted that several of Michelangelo's records have been distributed and circulated among his friends in throughout San Francisco. Original Punker Andrew Frank remained active from 1971 to his last public performance in 1994, making appearances in shows with Toni Basil, Diana Ross at venues such as Radio Music Hall, NYCs performance art theatre, The Kitchen, and Basil's Shocking The House in LA.

The dance continue to be performed and influence styles such as the hybrid, streetjazz and become popular in nycs underground among club and house dancers, until its resurgence in the early 2000s.

== Articles ==
In 2022, The LA Times featured an article "These artists are preserving the history of a dance style gay men created in '70s " by Steven Vargas highlighting the history of Punking through interviews with Viktor Manoel. In 2024, The Nordic Journal Of Dance Vol 14 (1), Vol 14 (2) published the practice article "Punking: How Appropiation Revitalised It And The Role Institutions Play In The Protection Of This Elusive Art " detailing the history and documented experiences of the author, Alyssa Chloe through multiple perspectives of evolution of the dance and research.

== See also ==
- List of street and vernacular dances
- List of ethnic, regional, and folk dances sorted by origin
- Waacking
- Vogue (dance)
