= Square dance (disambiguation) =

A square dance is a dance for four couples (eight dancers) arranged in a square, with one couple on each side, facing the middle of the square.

Square dance may also refer to:

- Square Dance (ballet), a 1957 ballet by George Balanchine
- Square Dance (film), a 1987 film
- "Square Dance", a 2002 song by Eminem from The Eminem Show
- Square dancing (China), or guangchangwu, dancing for fitness and socialization often done by older women in public spaces in China
