= Vernacular (disambiguation) =

A vernacular is the common speech variety of a specific population, as opposed to the national standardised language.

Vernacular may also refer to:

- Vernacular architecture, a category of architecture based on local needs and construction materials, and reflecting local tradition
- Vernacular culture, cultural forms made and organised by ordinary, often indigenous people
- Vernacular dance, dance styles that evolved outside of dance studios
- Vernacular geography, the sense of place that is revealed in ordinary people's language
- Vernacular literature, literature written in the vernacular — the speech of the "common people"
- Vernacular photography, photographs made for everyday and functional purposes rather than fine art
