= Habibitch =

Algerian artist and queer rights activist

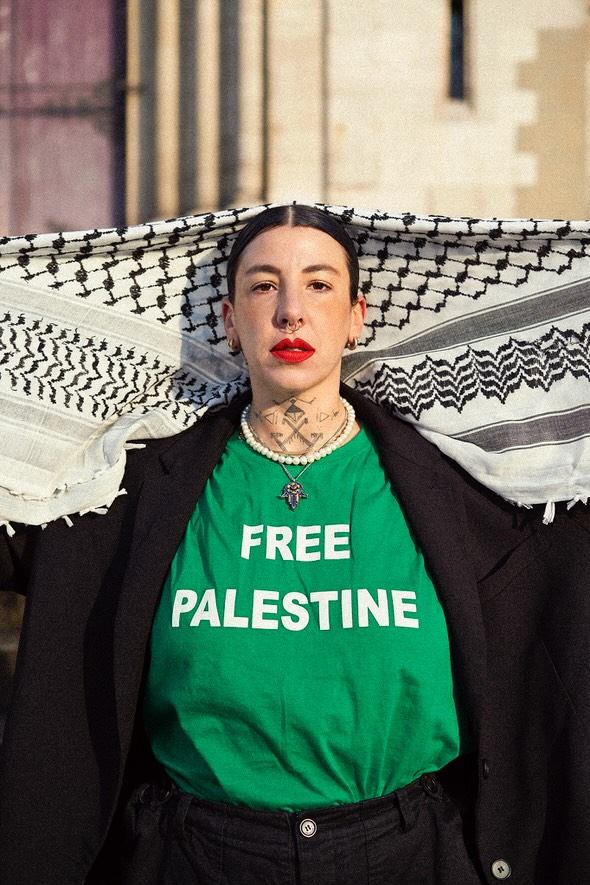
Habibitch

Habibitch, formerly known as Ari de B, is a non-binary artist, voguing and waacking dancer of Franco-Algerian origins. As a queer feminist decolonial activist, they transform dance floors into political spaces.

== Biography ==
=== Early life ===
Habibitch, whose real name is Lissia Benoufella, was born in the 1980s, in Algiers, Algeria. When they were four years old, their family of Kabyle origins, settled in France to flee the civil war that was raging in their country of origin. They remember the material distress of their parents upon their arrival, who both became teachers.

=== Studies ===
They grew up in Vendée, and since their childhood, dreamt of becoming a dancer. After completing their first level of undergraduate studies with a specialization in humanities (known in the French education system as classes préparatoires littéraires), they then earned a double degree in history and Spanish (equivalent to a bachelor's degree with a double major) as well as completing a master's degree in gender studies at Sciences Po Toulouse (class of 2011).

=== Artistic career ===
Habibtich discovered voguing in 2011 during a trip to San Francisco with their partner at the time. There, they worked for an LGBTQ film festival where the film Paris is Burning, directed by Jennie Livingston, was screened. Watching this film, has thus, sparked a real « epiphany » in them.

In 2013, Habibitch auditioned for a professional hip hop dance school, which then admitted her into the school. Already involved in activism, they then lived as a squatter and got more involved in the queer, feminist, and anarchist milieu as an intersectional activist. Later, they joined the Paris Ballroom scene and community where they met Kiddy Smile, who took an interest in them and allowed them to join the House of Mizhani in 2015.

In 2017, they organized their first dance conference, that they called Decolonize the Dancefloor which they then adapted depending on the events and places they participate and intervene in, following an approach that prioritizes the «application of all of their intersectional and decolonial practices in dance».

Simultaneously, Habibitch conducts workshops and animates conferences. They are also the godmother of House of Gorgeous Gucci in Paris, and provide initiation classes of waacking in the Parc de la Villette, in Paris.
