= Kanpu masatsu =

Japanese cultural custom

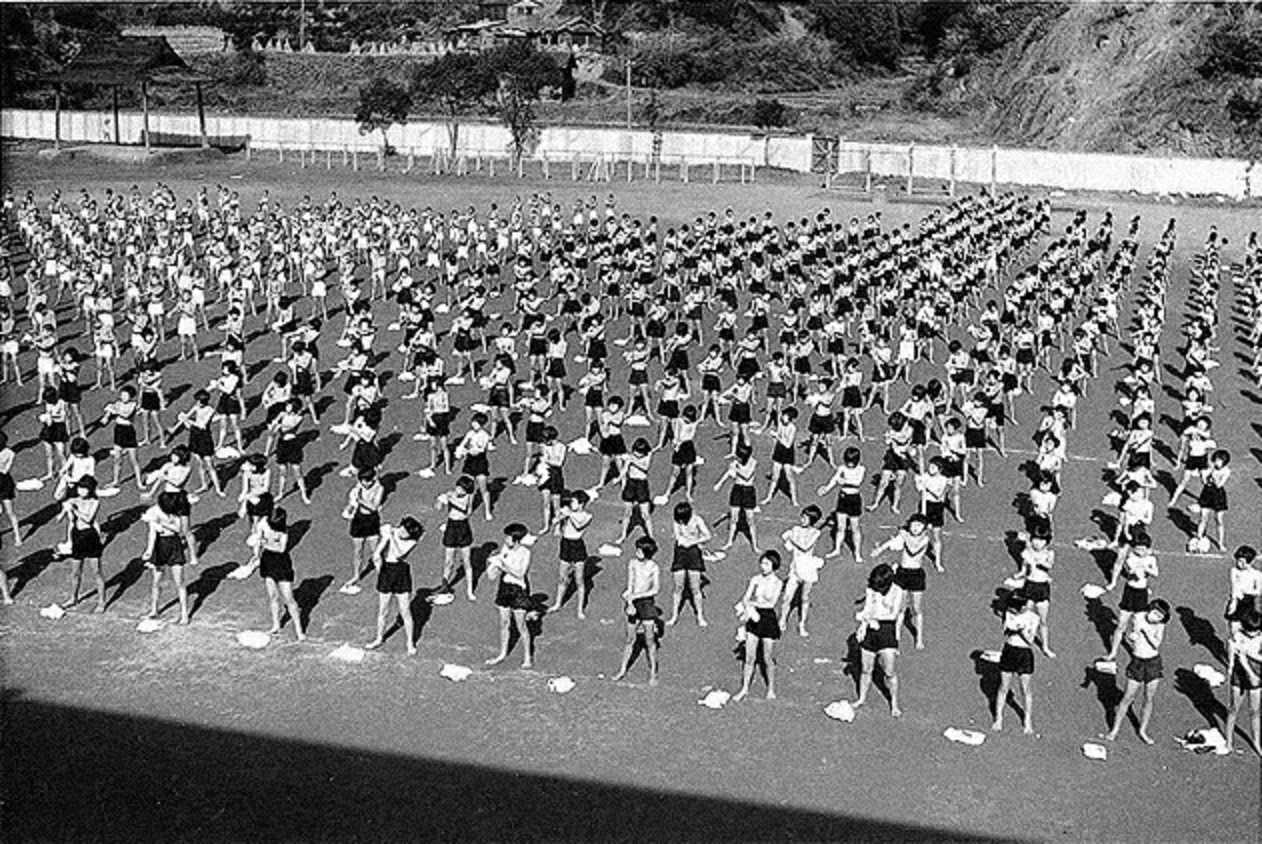
Schoolgirls performing kanpu masatsu (1941, Nobeoka, Miyazaki Prefecture)

Kanpu masatsu (乾布摩擦, literally dry towel friction) is a Japanese custom where one rubs a dry towel along the body to create warmth and friction, particularly in cold weather, to promote good health or ward off disease. Although it physically resembles a vigorous sponge bath, kanpu masatsu is not a form of bathing as its goal is to warm the skin by friction and not to cleanse or wipe the body. Kanpu masatsu is often practiced in a group environment, particularly among children in schools where it is sometimes part of a morning exercise routine.

Popularly believed to prevent disease, especially colds and flu, like many folk beliefs its effectiveness is unproven, though there is some evidence it may be mildly helpful. A 2012 study of 24 males at the Department of Immunology, Niigata University School of Medicine found changes in lymphocyte and granulocyte levels versus a control group and concluded that kanpu masatsu is a "mild aerobic, systemic exercise that might affect the immune system via the autonomic nervous system." A 2002 study at the Central Aizu General Hospital of bedridden elderly patients reported possibly beneficial results, concluding "This technique may be used to reduce a variety of complications caused by the decreased immunity observed in bedridden old patients."

== See also ==
- Culture of Japan
- Massage therapy
- Radio calisthenics
