= School assembly =

Gathering of all or part of a school

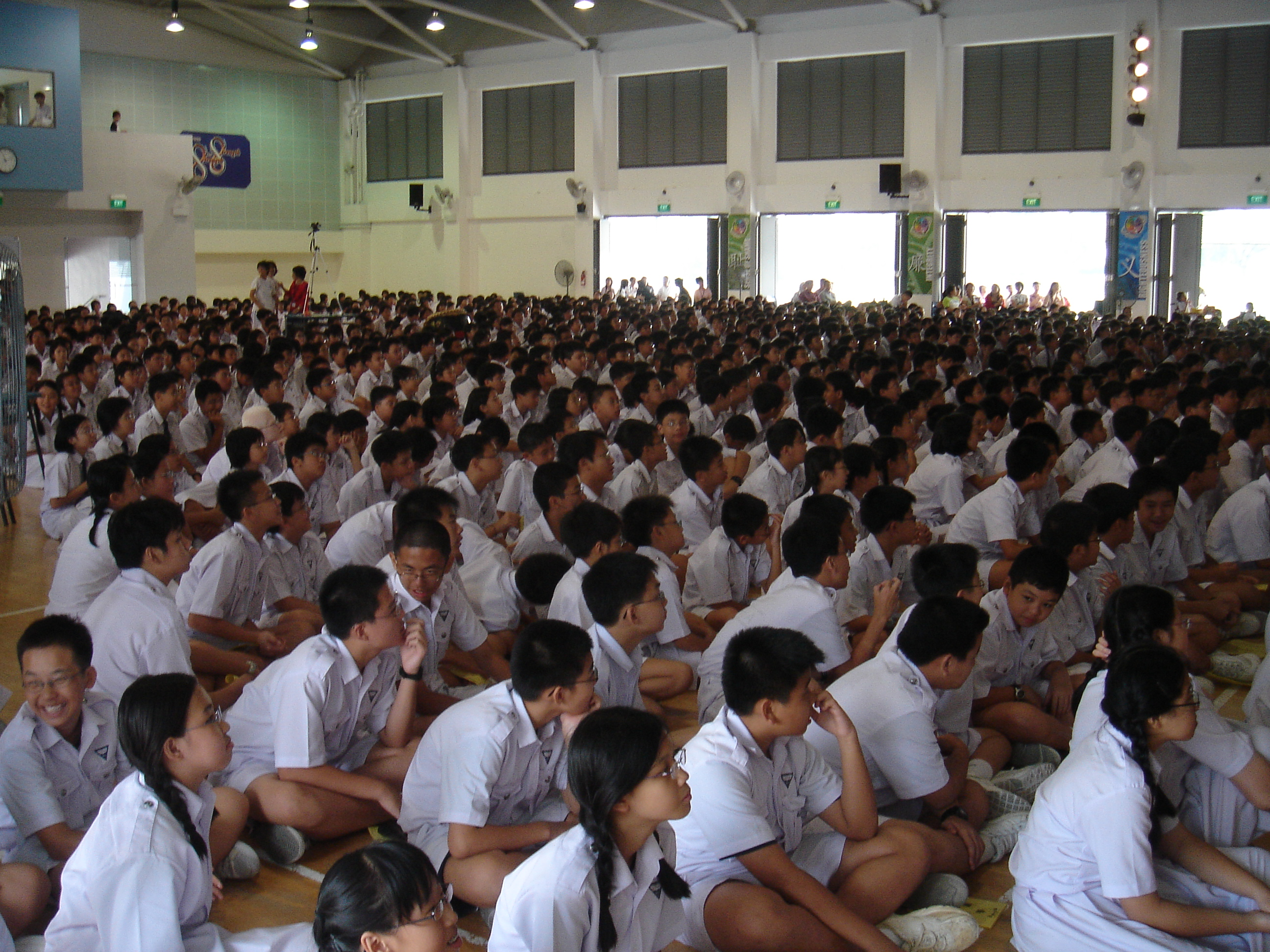
Assembly at Nan Hua High School, Singapore

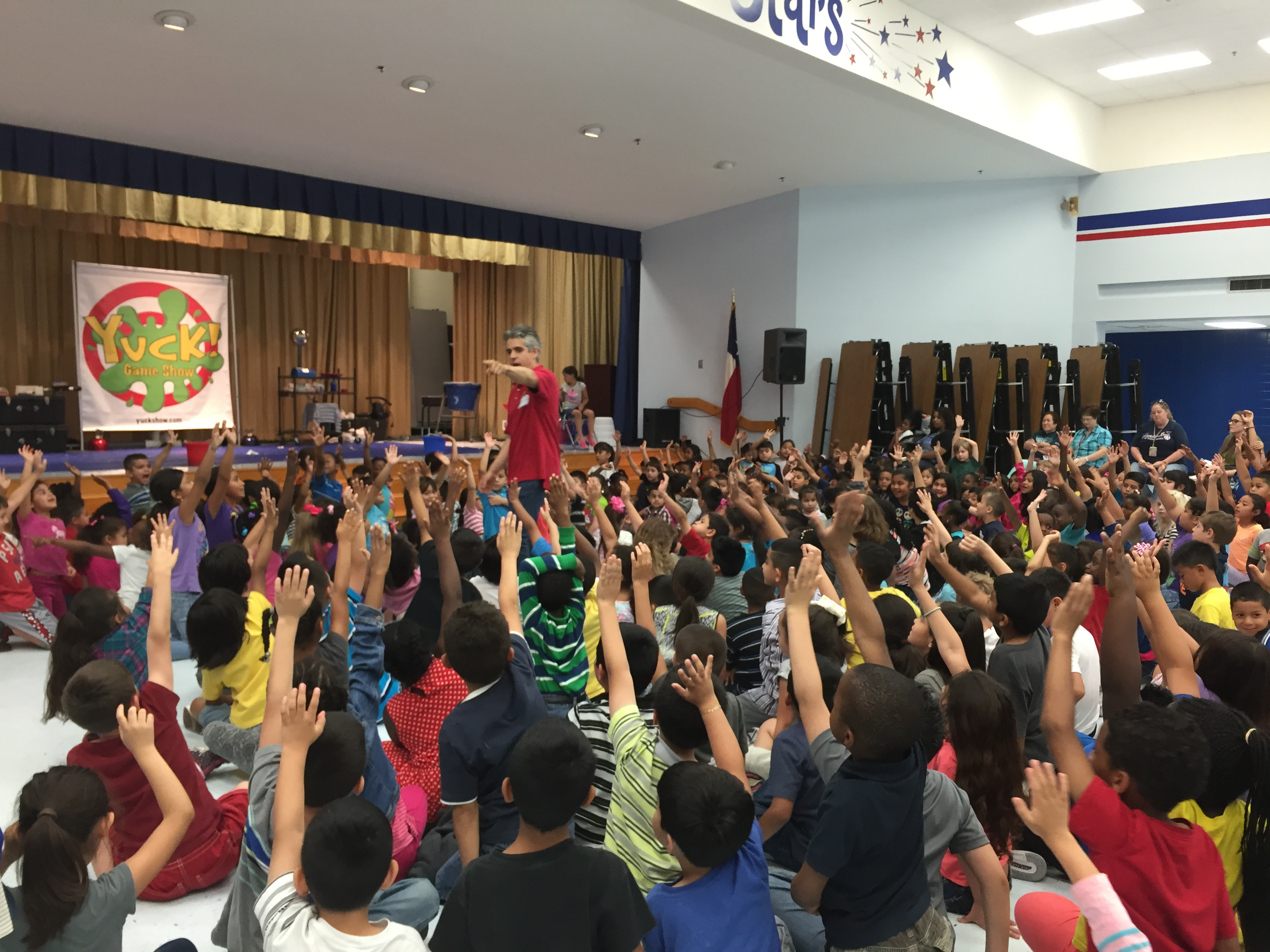
Students in Houston, Texas volunteering for the Yuck Game Show science assembly program.

A school assembly is a gathering of all or part of a school for various purposes, such as special programs or communicating information. In some schools, students may to perform a common song or prayer, receive announcements, or present awards. A routine attendance check may be done in such gatherings. At some schools, these meetings may be substituted by smaller classroom gatherings (sometimes called form or home room) and announcements broadcast over a public address system. Periodic school assemblies can be a forum for special presenters of educational, health, or safety materials, or for school plays, talent shows, etc.

== History ==
An act of collective gathering and worship is a part of the assembly in England and is a legal requirement in schools.

== Elements ==
A school assembly may include prayer, news headline, speakers, discussions among students, student talk, rewarding or praising a student(s) and other important discussions. It may also have a gathering of student parliament.

== Countries ==
=== China ===
Due to the number of students in a typical Chinese school, assemblies are typically held outdoors. It is common for the head of school to address the student body for nearly an hour at the beginning of a school week or month.

=== Malaysia ===
School assemblies are usually held in school halls or in outdoor areas such as the school sports complex or basketball courts. School assemblies are held weekly, usually on Mondays. Students sing the national, state, and school anthems while raising the national flag. They recite the Rukun Negara and hear reports, speeches and announcements from the principal, teachers, and prefects. Assemblies usually last for an hour. Schools also have smaller assemblies every other day where students gather before the start of their first class or when the first bell rings. Teachers and students often make quick and simple announcements for 15 minutes before sending the students to their classrooms. Schools in Malaysia use the homeroom system. This daily gathering prevents students from playing truant as class monitors take attendance when the students are in the hall, loitering before class starts. This makes it easier to catch and punish those who are tardy.

=== India and Pakistan ===
Assemblies are usually held outdoors for 20 minutes at least every day. Teachers and students recite a common prayer. Special announcements are made and students present thoughts of the day and attendance is marked. Sometimes students present a skit or a cultural programme.

=== Ireland ===
Roman Catholic schools in Ireland often include a prayer in morning assemblies.

=== United States ===
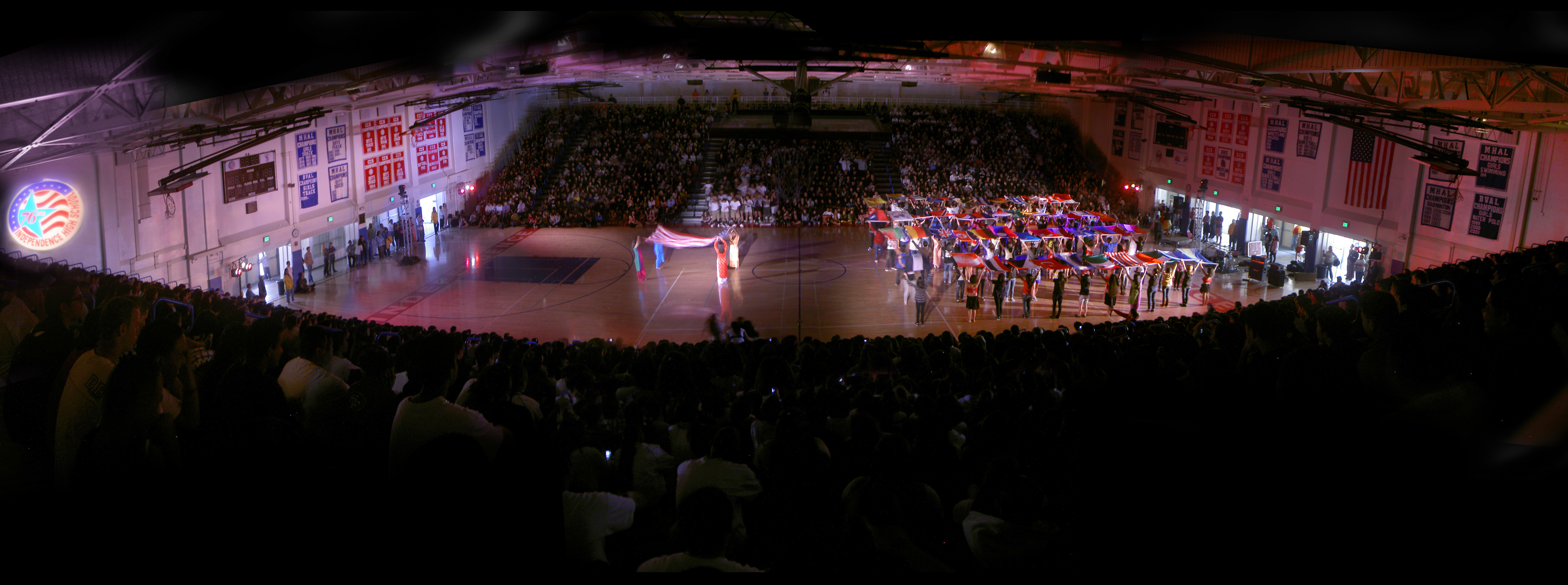
Independence High School (San Jose, California)'s Flag Ceremony during its 2009 Multicultural Assembly.

== See also ==
- Pre-work assembly
