= History of Chinese dance =

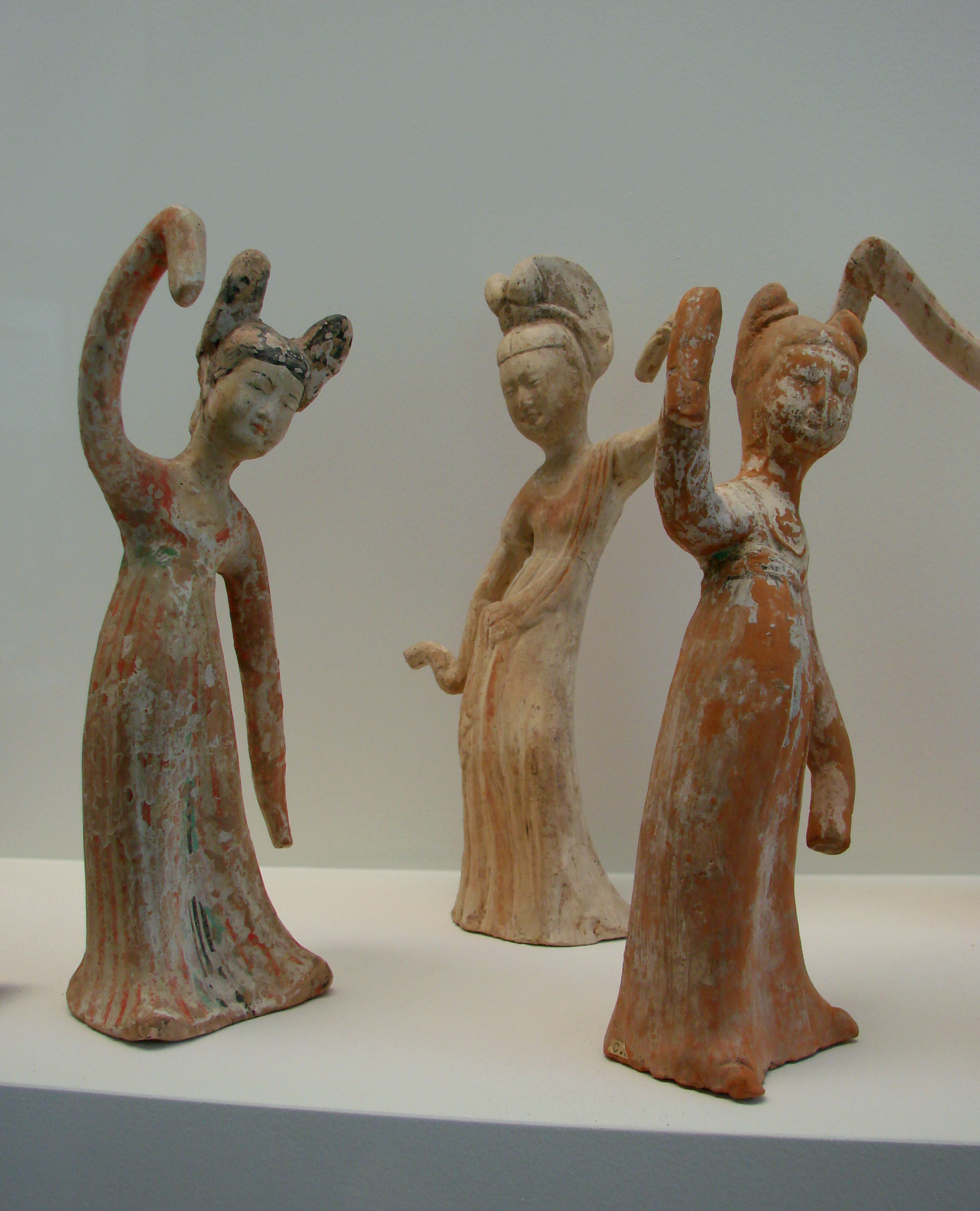
Tang dynasty figurines of female dancers. Dancing with sleeve movements is known from the Zhou dynasty and earlier in China.

Dance in China has a long recorded history. Depictions of dancing in China appeared over 4,000 years ago. The early dances may be folk dances or ritual dances, some of which developed into court dances. The most important of the early dances served important ritual and ceremonial roles and are known as yayue, which continued to be performed at the imperial court until the Qing dynasty. A profusion of dances in popular and court entertainment as well as folk dances have been recorded in ancient texts. The art of dance in China reached a peak during the Tang dynasty (618–907 CE) when numerous dances were recorded. Dancing as an individual art form declined in the later eras when dances become incorporated into operas and female dancing also declined when footbinding became more prevalent. In more recent times dance has enjoyed a resurgence, and it is widely performed by the public and professionals alike.

There are continuous written records of Chinese dances for over two thousands years. Some forms of dancing are still performed today, for example, dancing with long sleeves has been recorded at least as early as the Zhou dynasty (c. 1045–256 BCE). Some of the best-known Chinese dances, such as the Lion dance, can also be traced to the Tang dynasty or earlier, while others may have existed in different forms in the early eras, and many were known from at least the Song era. While many Chinese dances have ancient pedigree, dance is also a continually evolving art form and modern developments in Chinese dances are continuing apace.

== Early history ==
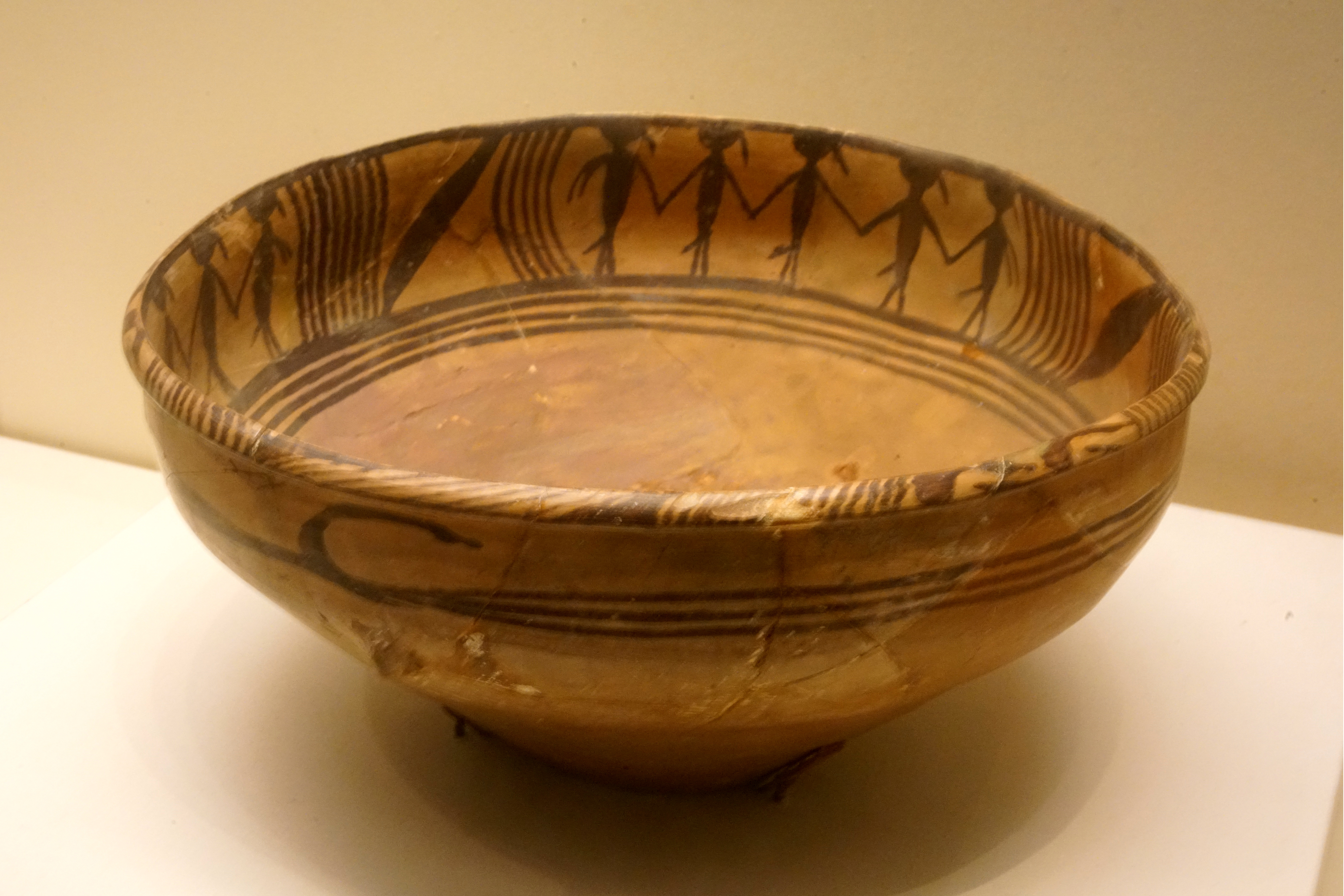
Bowl from the Majiayao culture (c.3300 - 2000 BC) decorated with figures of men dancing in line

Pictorial representations of dance have been found in Chinese pottery as early as the Neolithic period (before 2000 BCE), showing people dancing in a line holding hands. The earliest Chinese character for "dance",, appears in the oracle bones and represents a dancer holding oxtails in each hand. According to the Lüshi Chunqiu (compiled around 239 BCE): "In former times, the people of the Getian clan (葛天氏) would dance in pairs [or threes] with oxtails in hand, stamping their feet and singing eight stanzas."

Primitive dance in ancient China was also associated with sorcery and shamanic ritual. An early shape of the Chinese character for sorcerer, wu (巫), represented dancing shamans or their sleeves; wu therefore described someone who danced as a mean of communication between gods and men. There are many ancient records of shamans and sorcerers who danced, for example performing the rain dance at time of drought. The rain dance (舞雩; wǔyú) platform is mentioned in many ancient texts including the Analects of Confucius.

Ancient Chinese texts such the Rites of Zhou (2nd century BCE) record dances of the early period. The most important of the Zhou dynasty dances are the six dances termed the "Great Dances" that were performed to venerate Heaven, Earth, gods, ancestors or legendary figures. These six dances formed part of the system of court music and dance first established during the Western Zhou dynasty (1046–771 BCE) known as Yayue. Music and dance were considered integral parts of a whole, each dance would have a piece of music associated with it; the word for music (樂; yue) therefore can also refer to dance, and it may also be further extended to poetry as well as other art forms and rituals. These six dances were said to have originated from the time of six historical or legendary figures:

- Yunmen Dajuan (雲門大卷), from the Yellow Emperor era, performed for the veneration of the sky.
- Daxian (大咸) or Dazhang (大章), from the Emperor Yao era, for the veneration of the earth.
- Daqing (大磬) or Dashao (大韶), from the Emperor Shun era, for the veneration of Gods of the Four Directions, or the sun, moon, stars and seas.
- Daxia (大夏), in honour of Yu the Great, for the veneration of mountain and rivers.
- Dahu (大濩), from Tang of Shang dating to the end of the Xia dynasty, for the veneration of female ancestors.
- Dawu (大武), in praise of King Wu of Zhou, used for ancestral worship.

Dashao (大韶) was a dance said to date from the time of Emperor Shun (the Neolithic epoch), the dancers may have dressed up as birds and beasts. One of the earliest documents, Shujing, mentioned the ritual of "beating on the stones as all the wild animals dance". The performance of the dance was highly regarded by Confucius.

Daxia was a dance performed in praise of Yu the Great of the Xia dynasty, famous for his work on flood control. In this dance, 64 performers danced bare-chested wearing fur caps and white skirts. The movements of the dance may imitate the manual labour performed during flood control.

These formal dances were divided into two types, civil and military. In a Civil Dance (文舞), dancers held item such as feather banners in their hand, and Military Dance (武舞) involved brandishing of weapons. Dawu was an important dance in six parts describing the military exploits of King Wu of Zhou, and may involve martial elements such as the use of weapons.

Another six formed what was called the "Small Dances", to be performed by younger members of the aristocracy in minor ceremonies and sacrifice rituals. These are:

- Five-Colour Silk Dance (帗舞), performed for the worship of the land and Grain Gods.
- Feather Dance (羽舞), as tribute to ancestral temples or the Gods of the Four Directions.
- Imperial Dance (皇舞), performed as homage to the Gods of the Four Directions or as a rain dance.
- Yak-tail Banner Dance (旄舞), performed at sacrificial sites in Biyong (辟雍), a seat of learning.
- Shield Dance (干舞), performed for military purpose or for the veneration of mountains and rivers.
- Dance of the People (人舞), performed in honour of the stars or ancestral temples.

All the dances involved dancers holding objects such as feather plumes, yak-tails or shield, except the Dance of the People which is focused on sleeve movements.

Aside from the formal and ritual dances, popular and folk dances are also mentioned in ancient texts. In the Book of Rites, it is recorded that Marquis Wen of Wei expressed concerns about falling asleep during the measured and stately court performances and preferred the popular new music and dances of Wey and Zheng; however, his Confucian advisor condemned these as decadent and disorderly.

During the Spring and Autumn and Warring States periods, descriptions of professional dancing girls also appear in ancient texts. These may have been people from poorer family who visited and performed in the women's quarters in the palace or at houses of the nobles. Slaves had been kept as dancers since the Xia dynasty.

== Qin and Han dynasties (221 BCE – 220 CE) ==
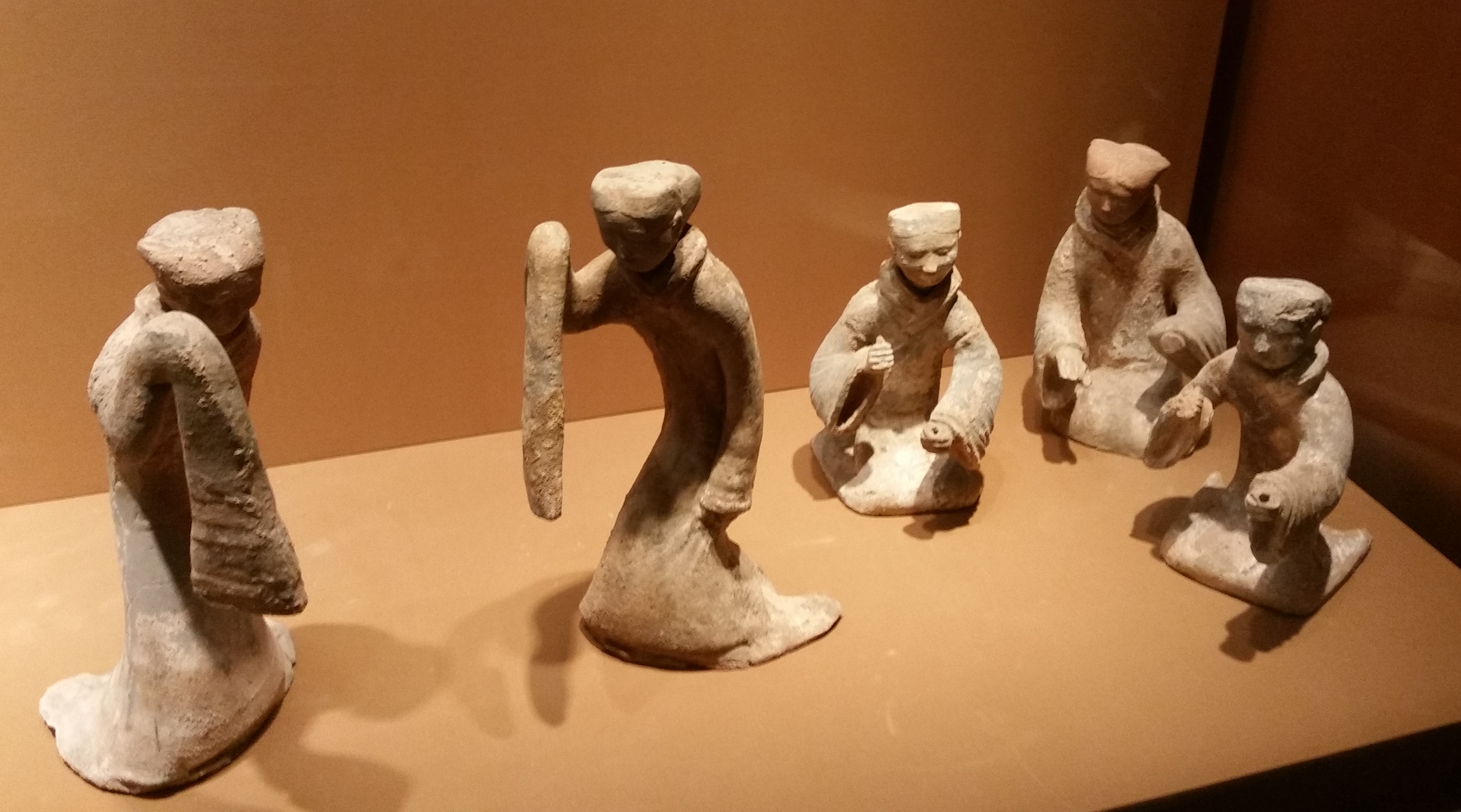
Han dynasty figurines showing dancers with long sleeves

During the Qin and Han dynasties, the imperial court established the yuefu (literally Music Bureau), which was responsible for collecting folk music and dance for performance at the court. A popular dance of the Han dynasty is the Long Sleeve Dance, which is depicted in many images and sculptures of the period, and this form of traditional dance survives to this day. The sleeve may be long and narrow, long and wide, or similar to the "water sleeves" used in Chinese opera. Historical texts also recorded that dancers danced bending at the waist while moving their sleeves.

Many dances of this period are mentioned in historical texts. In one account, a sword dance was said to have been performed by Xiang Zhuang at a banquet in an attempt to assassinate Liu Bang (the founder of the Han dynasty) at the Feast at Hong Gate. This event forms the basis of the "Gong Mo" Dance (公莫舞) – "Gong Mo", literally "Sir, Don't!", which describes the blocking actions by Xiang Bo during the sword dance to prevent Xiang Zhuang from thrusting his sword towards Liu Bang. The "Gong Mo" Dance was later known as the Scarf Dance (巾舞). The dance is performed with a long scarf held in each hand, and is similar to today's Long Silk Dance. Liu Bang was also said to be fond of the war dance of the Ba people, called the Bayu (巴渝) dance and known in later eras in various names such as Zhaowu (昭武) in the Eastern Wu period and Xuanwu (宣武) during the Jin dynasty. Large-scale performances of this dance involved brandishing weapons to the accompaniment of drums and songs in the Ba language.

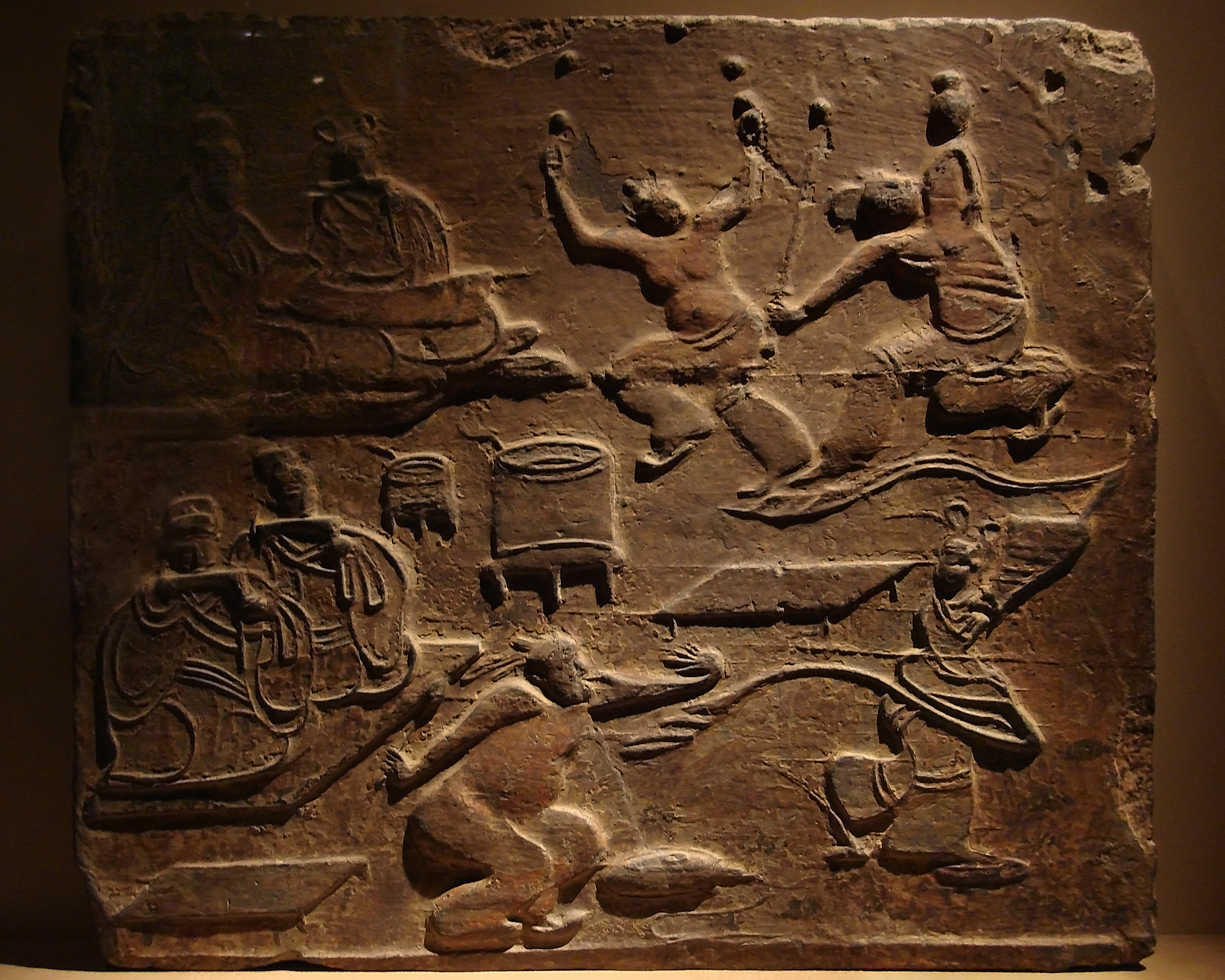
Acrobats and dancers depicted in a tomb chamber in Chengdu dating to the Eastern Han dynasty. The dancer held in each hand long pieces of silk on rod.

Other dances of the period included the Drum Dance (鞞舞), Bell Dance (鐸舞), Sabre Dance, and mixed couple dance (對舞). Fu Yi's (傅毅) Lyric Essay on Dance describes the Seven Tray Dance (七盤舞, also called Tray Drum Dance 盤鼓舞), a fusion of acrobatics and dance in which the dancer leaps gracefully between trays and drums on the trays, which gets faster as the dance progresses.

During the Han dynasty, a popular form of entertainment is the variety show called baixi (百戲; "hundred shows") that developed from the jiaodi (角抵; "originally a form of wrestling game with men wearing horns") of the Qin dynasty. In such shows, various Chinese variety arts are performed, such as acrobatics, martial art, magic tricks, comic performances, music and dance. Zhang Heng recorded various performances in his Lyric Essay on Western Capital (西京賦), describing dancers dressed as beasts, fish and dragons.

One famous Han dynasty dancer is Zhao Feiyan, a great beauty who rose from a humble beginning to become an Empress. She was named Feiyan or "Flying Swallow" after her slender figure and lithe dance steps, so light that she appeared to be quivering like a flower in the hand. Professional dancers of the period were of low social status and many entered the profession through poverty, although some such as Zhao Feiyan achieved higher status by becoming concubines. Another dancer was Wang Wengxu (王翁須) who was forced to become a domestic singer-dancer but who later bore the future Emperor Xuan of Han.

== Six Dynasties era (220–589 CE) ==
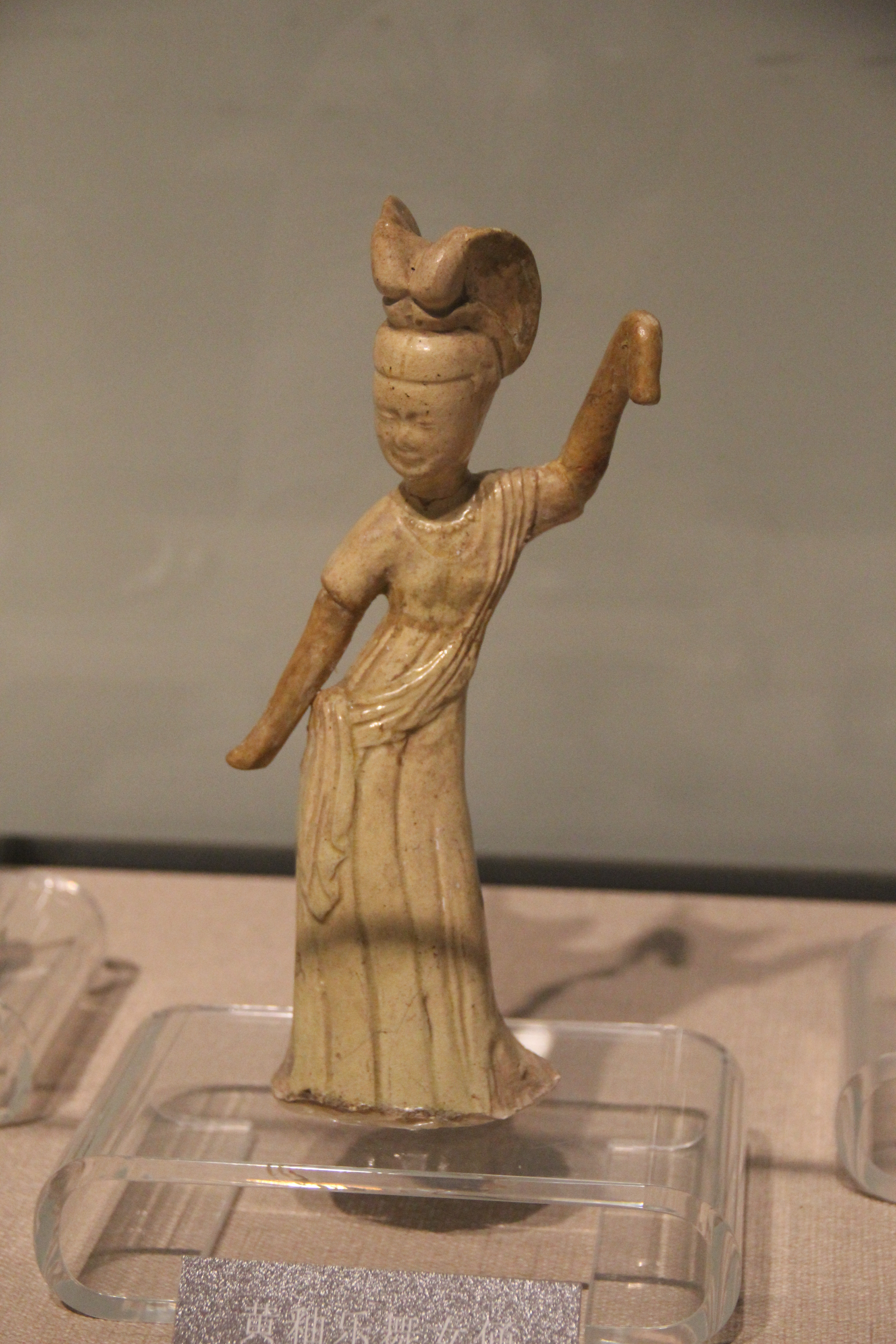
Sui dynasty figure of a dancer

In the Six Dynasties period, between the end of the Han dynasty and the beginning of the Sui dynasty, there were pronounced influences from Central Asia on Chinese music and dance. Musical instruments such as the pear-shaped pipa and dances such as the lion dance may have been introduced in this period via Central Asia. The music and dance of Kucha became popular, as did that of Western Liang (in modern Gansu province), which may be an assimilation of styles from Han and other non-Han people. Emperor Wu of Northern Zhou, who was of Xianbei origin, married a Turkic princess who also brought music and dances of Central Asia to China.

This period saw civil wars as well as conflicts with the "Five Barbarians", resulting in the splintering of China into multiple states and dynasties established by Han and non-Han Chinese people. The imperial court of the Jin dynasty (266–420) was relocated to the south and many Han Chinese also migrated southwards due to pressure from the northern Hu tribes. This migration resulted in a fusion of the music and dance of the Central Plains with those of the southern local traditions, producing a genre known as Qingshang (清商) music (later known simply as 清樂; Qingyue).

When the capital shifted to Jiankang (in present-day Nanjing), music and dance from the Wu region in the lower Yangtze River became popular. These dances included the Qianxi Dance (前溪舞), Qianxi being a village where performers once gathered to learn music and dance; the Whisk Dance (拂舞); White Ramie Dance (白紵舞); the Cup Tray Dance (杯槃舞); and the Mingjun Dance (明君舞), which tells the story of Wang Zhaojun.

== Sui and Tang dynasties (581–907 CE) ==
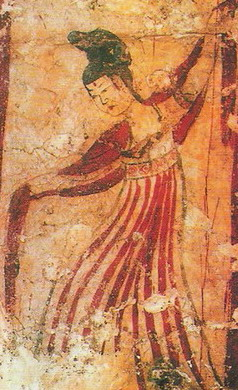
A Tang dynasty dancer from a mural unearthed in Xi'an dancing with a shawl.

In the later part of the 6th century, Emperor Wen of the Sui dynasty ended the strife and division of China, and re-unified the country. The Sui dynasty collected the music and dance of the various peoples under its rule as well as popular music from outside China into the "Seven Books of Music" (七部樂), describing the music and dance of the Western Liang, Korea, India, Bukhara, Kucha, the Qingshang and the Wenkang (文康), a masked dance, later known as Libi (禮畢).

Later in the Sui dynasty, the music and dance of Shule and Samarkand were added to form the "Nine Books of Music", further expanded into ten during the reign of Emperor Taizong in the Tang dynasty, when Yanyue (燕樂; "banquet music") and the music of Gaochang was added but Wenkang dropped. The most popular of these were Qingshang, Western Liang (a fusion of Han Chinese and Western Regions music and dance) and Kuchan music.

These collections of dances performed at the imperial court show the diversity and cosmopolitan nature of the music and dance of the Tang dynasty: only the Yanyue and Qingshang music originated with the Han Chinese. Music and dance from India, Central Asia, Southeast Asia (Pyu and Funan) and other states bordering Tang China such as Tuyuhun and Nanzhao were performed in the imperial capital Chang'an with performers and dancers in native costume. The Tang imperial court gathered the top dancing talent of the country to perform a lavish dance that incorporated elements of the dance of China, Korea, India, Persia and Central Asia.

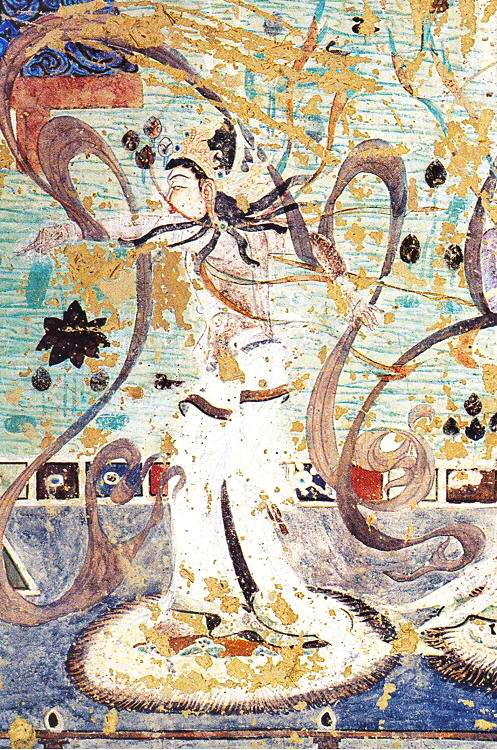
Dancer in mural from Mogao Caves performing perhaps the Whirling Dance where the dancers spin on a circular mat

Particularly popular were dances from Central Asia like the Sogdian Whirling Dance (胡旋舞) of Samarkand, a dance involving rapid spinning (spinning dance moves are still found amongst the Uyghur people today). The dance was also said to have been performed by An Lushan and Emperor Xuanzong's concubine Consort Yang.

Another very popular dance was the Mulberry Branch Dance (柘枝舞) from Tashkent, that may be danced solo accompanied by rapid drumming, or as a duo whereby two girls first appeared hidden within a large lotus flower. There was also a male solo dance called the Barbarian Leap Dance (胡騰舞), described as the dance of a white-skinned people with high-bridged nose.

The Tang dynasty was the golden age of Chinese music and dance. Institutions were set up to oversee the training and performances of music and dances in the imperial court, such as the Great Music Bureau (太樂署) responsible for yayue and yanyue, and the Drums and Pipes Bureau (鼓吹署) responsible for ceremonial music. Emperor Gaozu set up the Royal Academy, while Emperor Xuanzong established the Pear Garden Academy for the training of musicians, dancers and actors. There were around 30,000 musicians and dancers at the imperial court during the reign of Emperor Xuanzong, with most specialising in yanyue. All were under the administration of the Drums and Pipes Bureau and an umbrella organization called the Taichang Temple (太常寺).

Musical performances at the Tang court were of two types: seated performances (坐部伎) and standing performances (立部伎). Seated performances were conducted in smaller halls with limited number of dancers, and emphasised refined artistry. Standing performances involves numerous dancers, and were usually performed in courtyards or squares intended for grand presentations.

Standing performance pieces included The Seven Virtues Dance (七德舞), originally called "The Prince of Qin Breaks Through The Ranks" (秦王破陣樂), celebrating the military exploits of Emperor Taizong (previously known as the Prince of Qin before he became the Emperor). It was performed with 120 dancers in gold-decorated armour with spears, but it can also be performed as a seated performance by four dancers in red silk robes. Two other notable major dances of the Tang dynasty were the Blessed Goodness Dance (慶善舞, also called Nine Merits Dance, 九功舞), and The Supreme Original Dance (上元舞).

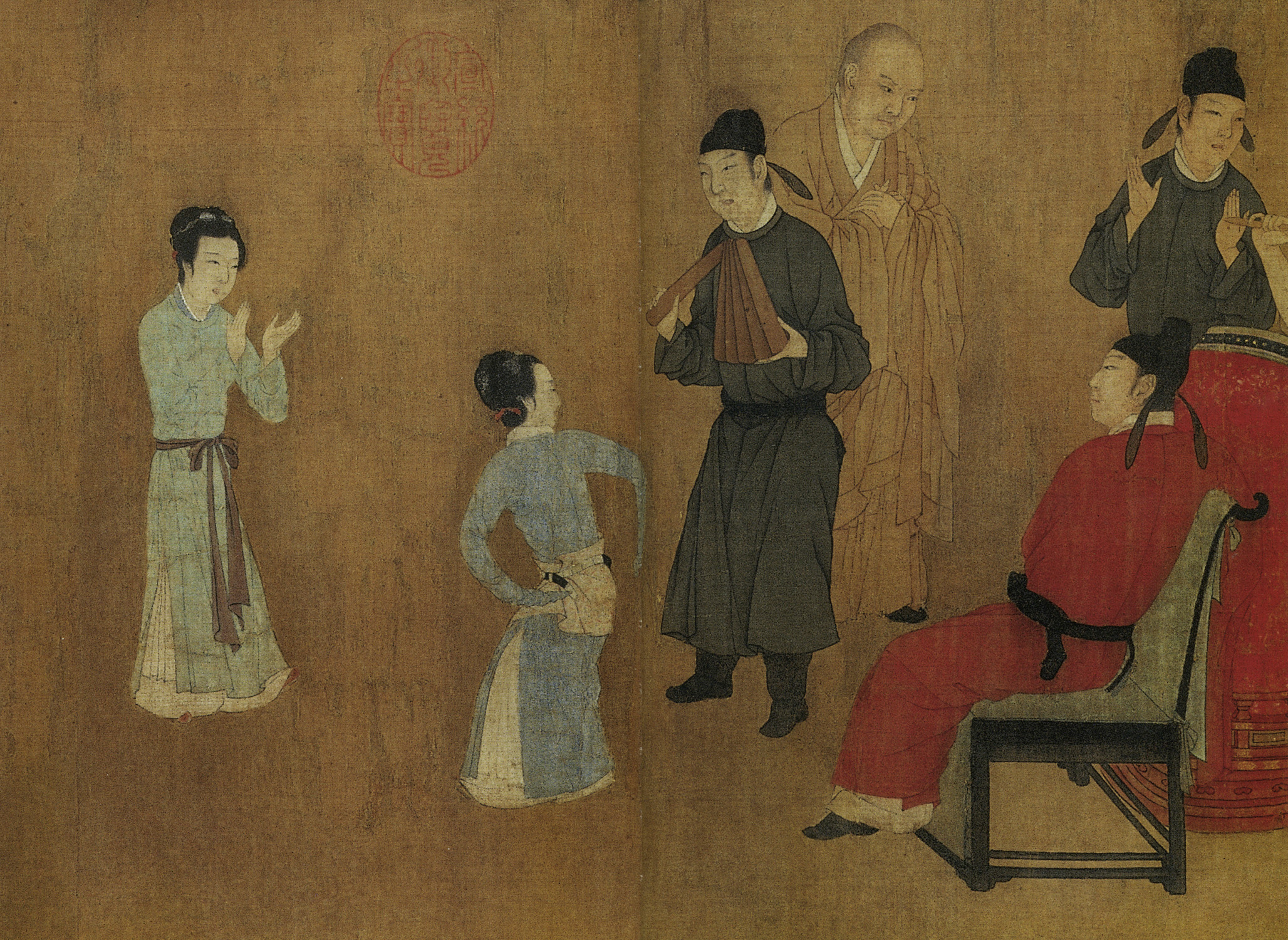
Details from the Southern Tang/Song dynasty painting "Night Revels of Han Xizai" by Gu Hongzhong, depicting the dancer Wang Wushan (王屋山) performing the Green Waist Dance from the Tang dynasty. The dance was also called Liuyao (六么) due to its similarity in pronunciation to Green Waist (綠腰; Luyao).

Small-scale dances, performed during banquets and other occasions, may be divided into two categories: energetic dances (健舞), which were vigorous and athletic, and soft dances (軟舞), which were gentle and graceful. Energetic dances included those from Central Asia, such as Whirling Dance, Mulberry Branch Dance and the Barbarian Leap Dance. A well-known energetic dance is the Sword Dance, famously performed by Lady Gongsun (公孫大娘), whose performance was reputed to have inspired the cursive calligraphy of Zhang Xu. Soft Dances included the Green Waist Dance (綠腰), a female solo dance.

Large scale performances at banquets with singers, dancers and musicians at the Tang court were called Grand Compositions (大曲). These developed from the Xianghe Grand Compositions (相和大曲) of the Han dynasty but became highly elaborate during the Tang dynasty. A particularly renowned example is the Rainbow Skirt Feathered Dress Dance (霓裳羽衣舞) choreographed by Consort Yang and set to a tune said to have been composed by Emperor Xuanzong himself. This dance, originally called the Brahmin Dance, may have been a Central Asian or Indian dance brought to the Tang court by way of Kucha. It was a slow gentle dance that may be danced in groups but also as a solo, set to strings and woodwind with a humming chorus, with the dancers in elaborate costumes. After the An Lushan Rebellion which diminished the power and wealth of the state, and court music and dance became significantly reduced.

[[File:Ryouou in Bugaku (Hokkaido Gokoku-Jinja) 3.jpg|thumb|left|Some pieces of music and dance of the Tang dynasty that had disappeared from China survive in Japan. An example is the masked dance The King of Lanling (蘭陵王).]]

During the Sui and Tang dynasties, song-and-dance drama from the earlier dynasties became popular and developed further. Examples included the Big Face (大面) or "mask", also called "The King of Lanling" (蘭陵王), a masked dance from the Northern Qi dynasty honouring Gao Changgong who went into battle wearing a mask. The Botou (撥頭, meaning here using the hand to sweep hair aside), from Central Asia, is another masked dance. It tells of a grieving son seeking the tiger that killed his father, using his hand to keep the hair, unkempt through grieve, from the face so as to see better. "The Dancing Singing Woman" (踏謡娘) relates the story of a wife battered by her drunken husband, initially performed by a man dressed as a woman. The stories told in these song-and-dance dramas were simple but they are believed to be the precursors of Chinese opera and theatre.

Many of the dances of the Tang dynasty are described in Tang poetry: Bai Juyi and Yuan Zhen wrote of the Whirling Dance in their poems "The Whirling Hu Girl" (胡旋女), Du Fu of the sword dance. The White Ramie Dance, Lion Dance, and other dances are also mentioned. The Tang poets also wrote Ci verses set to the tunes for dances such as the "Boddhisattva Barbarian" (菩薩蠻), a processional dance (隊舞) that may have several hundred performers.

A great number of dances were recorded in the Tang dynasty, including over 60 Grand Compositions. Most, however, were lost after the collapse of Tang. The vigorous dancing styles from Central Asia were also rejected in subsequent eras, although some more sensual style survived. Some music and dances were transmitted to Japan and retained to this day as Tōgaku, now part of gagaku.

== Five Dynasties to the Song dynasty (907–1279 CE) ==
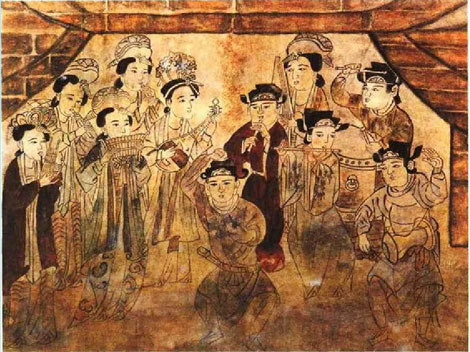
Mural from a Song dynasty tomb in Henan, depicting a male dancer accompanied by musicians.

A period of fragmentation, the Five Dynasties and Ten Kingdoms period, followed the fall of the Tang dynasty until China was unified under the Song dynasty. During the Song dynasty, footbinding began to spread among the elite in China, and the practice may have started during the Five Dynasties and Ten Kingdoms period among female dancers. One story concerns the favorite concubine of the Southern Tang emperor Li Yu who bound her feet into the shape of the crescent moon and performed a lotus dance on the point of her feet ballet-fashion. While perhaps originating from dancing, footbinding which spread among elite women during the Song dynasty would also contribute to the decline of dance as an art form. After the Song dynasty, as footbinding become more prevalent, less and less was heard about beauties and courtesans who were also great dancers. More severe binding in the subsequent eras also restricted female movement which, together increasing social restrictions placed on women, would eventually led to the virtual elimination of female dancers in later eras.

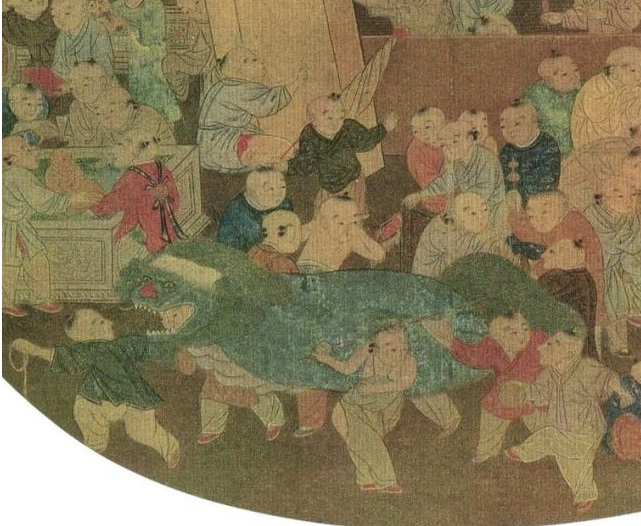
Details of the Song dynasty painting "One Hundred Children Playing in the Spring" (百子嬉春圖) by Su Hanchen (蘇漢臣) showing children performing the lion dance.

The popular centres of entertainment in the Song capital Bianliang (present-day Kaifeng) and later at Lin'an (present-day Hangzhou) were the wazi (瓦子; "tiles") or wasi (瓦肆; "tile market"), where theatres in the form of fenced-off rings called goulan (勾欄) may be found. Various forms of entertainment including dances were performed in these centres. Dances performed may be generally referred to as Dance Wheeling (舞旋), a reference to their spinning movement, and other foreign dances are called Dance of Foreign Music (舞番樂). Some dances from the Tang dynasty developed into a Team Dance with a leading dancer called the Flower Center, a presenter called Bamboo Pole, with background dancers and musicians. These dances incorporated singing as well as monologue and dialogue.

Many familiar dances of present-day China were mentioned in the Song dynasty, examples are the Flower Drum (花鼓); Playing the Big Head (耍大頭), which is the Big-headed Monk (大頭和尚) of later eras where the performer wears a large head mask; and the Dry Boat (旱船) Dance which is known from previous dynasties where a boy may dress up as a girl wearing a boat-like structure made of cloth so that he appeared to sit in a boat, and accompanied by a boatman holding an oar. Some of these dances may be performed by shehuo folk dance troupes that performed during festivals, and each village or city may have its own dance troupe. Other dances include Catching Butterflies (撲蝴蝶), Bamboo Horse (竹馬), and the Bao Lao Dance (舞鮑老, Bao Lao was a comic character in a puppet show).

In the wazi of the Song dynasty, various theatrical forms flourished and Chinese opera began to take shape. Dances became part of a more elaborate narrative; for example, the sword dance that depicts the Feast at Hong Gate would be followed by a depiction of the responses of Zhang Xu and Du Fu after watching the famed sword dance of Lady Gongsun. Stories are told, sometimes with songs incorporated in these dance performances. In the north, Chinese theatre developed in the form of the zaju variety show, and in the south, the nanxi opera.

== Yuan to Qing (1271–1912 CE) ==
Chinese opera became very popular by the Yuan dynasty, and in the following dynasties, a variety of genres such as the kunqu and Peking opera developed in various regions of China. Dances became absorbed into opera, and dance became an essential component to be mastered by opera performers. The integration of dance into opera is particularly evident in kunqu opera such as the Ming dynasty piece The Peony Pavilion whereby each phrase of singing may be accompanied by a dance movement, and the opera is interspersed with song-and-dance pieces. Dances such as "Dance Judgment" (舞判), also called the Dance of Zhong Kui (跳鐘馗), became opera pieces in the Ming dynasty, and dances of the Song dynasty such as Flapping the Flag (撲旗子) later became part of Chinese opera. As Chinese opera became increasingly popular, there was also a corresponding decline in dance as an individual separate art form. Even by the Ming dynasty, pure dance was already becoming uncommon outside of folk traditions and group performances during festivals, and would become increasingly rare. Dance performances by females, already in decline due to the practice of foot-binding as well as other social restrictions, also faced bans in later periods, for example women were forbidden to perform in Beijing theatre by the Qianlong Emperor during the Qing dynasty, and men therefore replaced women in female theatre roles and dance parts.

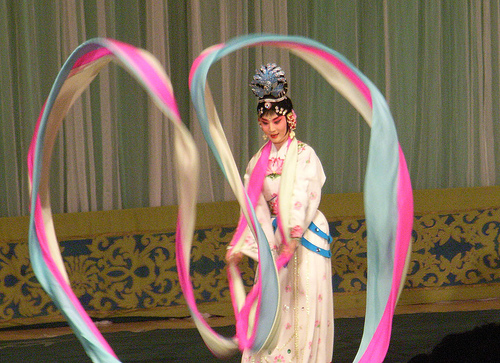
Dance as part of Peking Opera in a performance of "Heavenly Lady Scatters Flowers" (天女散花).

Folk dances, however, remained popular. Many of the folk dances of the Qing dynasty were known from the earlier period, for example, the yangge dance was developed from a dance known in the Song dynasty as Village Music (村田樂). Small-scale folk song-and-dance shows became popular in the Qing dynasty, examples are the Flower Drum, Flower Lantern (花燈) and Picking Tea (採茶) song and dance shows. The Flower Drum show was initially popular in the countryside, but then spread into towns. The Picking Tea show developed from the folk song and dance, Tea Picking Lantern. Some of these folk song and dance performances also influenced or developed into local forms of opera.

== Modern era ==
In the early 20th century, there was a call to "make use of old forms" of literature and art as a means of connecting with the masses. Traditional Chinese dance forms were revised and propagated. In 1943, the Chinese Communist Party launched the new yangge movement where the yangge dance was adopted as a means of rallying village support. The new dance is a simplified version of the old dance with socialist elements such as the leader of the holding a sickle instead of umbrella, and it is also known as "struggle yangge" or "reform yangge". The Lu Xun Academy of Arts had a significant role in the new Yangge movement.

Western dance forms became popular in the 20th century. For example, Western ballroom dancing became popular in the 1940s in Shanghai nightclubs, and early Communist leaders such as Mao Zedong and Zhou Enlai were also avid Soviet-style ballroom dancers. Previously it would not have been permissible for men and women from respectable families to dance together.

A group of people dancing in Shenzhen

A notable dancer of the twentieth century is Dai Ailian who collected folk dances and created new works based on these folk dances of the Han people as well as other ethnic minorities for public presentation. Her works include Lotus Dance which is based on a Shaanxi folk dance, Flying Apsaras based on the murals in the Mogao caves, The Drum of Yao People, The Mute Carries the Cripple, Tibetan Spring, and Anhui Folk Dance. Dai also established the first ballet school in China, Beijing Dance School, in 1954.

In the People's Republic of China era, the practice of creating new dances based on the older forms of dances as well as various folk traditions continues to the present days. Although traditional titles may be used, such dances as presented in theatre and television are generally modern imagination of long-lost ancient dances using modern choreography. In present-day China, various forms of outdoor dancing are commonly performed in public spaces or gardens by groups of people as a form of group exercise.

== Dragon dance and lion dance ==
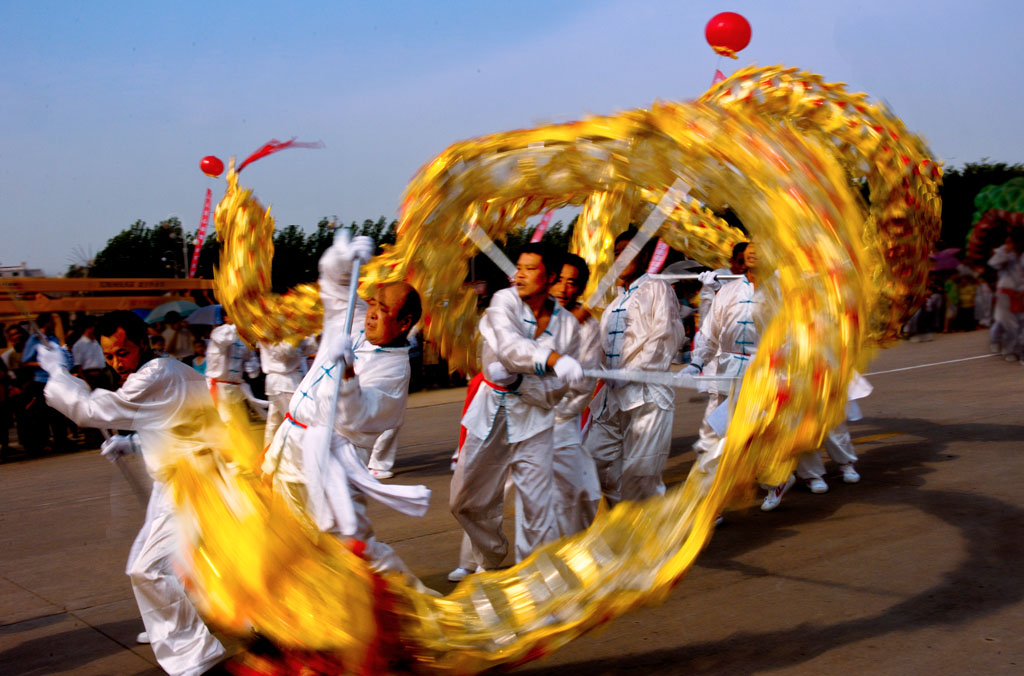
Dragon dance.

Among the best-known of the Chinese traditional dances are the dragon dance and lion dance, and both dances were known in earlier dynasties in various forms. A form of lion dance similar to today's lion dance was described as early as the Tang dynasty, the modern form of the dragon dance however may be a more recent development.

In some of the earliest dances recorded in China, dancers may have dressed as animal and mythical beasts, and during the Han dynasty, some forms of the dragon dance were mentioned. The Dragon was associated with rain, and during the Han dynasty, a dance may be performed during a ritual to appeal for rain at time of drought. According to the Han dynasty text Luxuriant Dew of the Spring and Autumn Annals by Dong Zhongshu, as part of the ritual, clay figures of the dragons were made and children or adults may then perform a dance. The number of dragons, their length and colour, as well as the performers may vary according to the time of year. In the baixi variety shows, performers called "mime people" (象人) dressed up as various creatures such as a green dragon playing a flute, and acts where fish turned into a dragon were also described. Some of the performances are depicted in Han dynasty stone relief engravings, and the props used appear to be cumbersome and do not resemble modern form of the dance. Modern dragon dance uses light-weight structure manipulated by a dozen or so of men using poles at regular intervals along the length of the dragon, and some forms of the dragon can be very long and involve hundreds of performers. There are more than 700 different dragon dances in China.

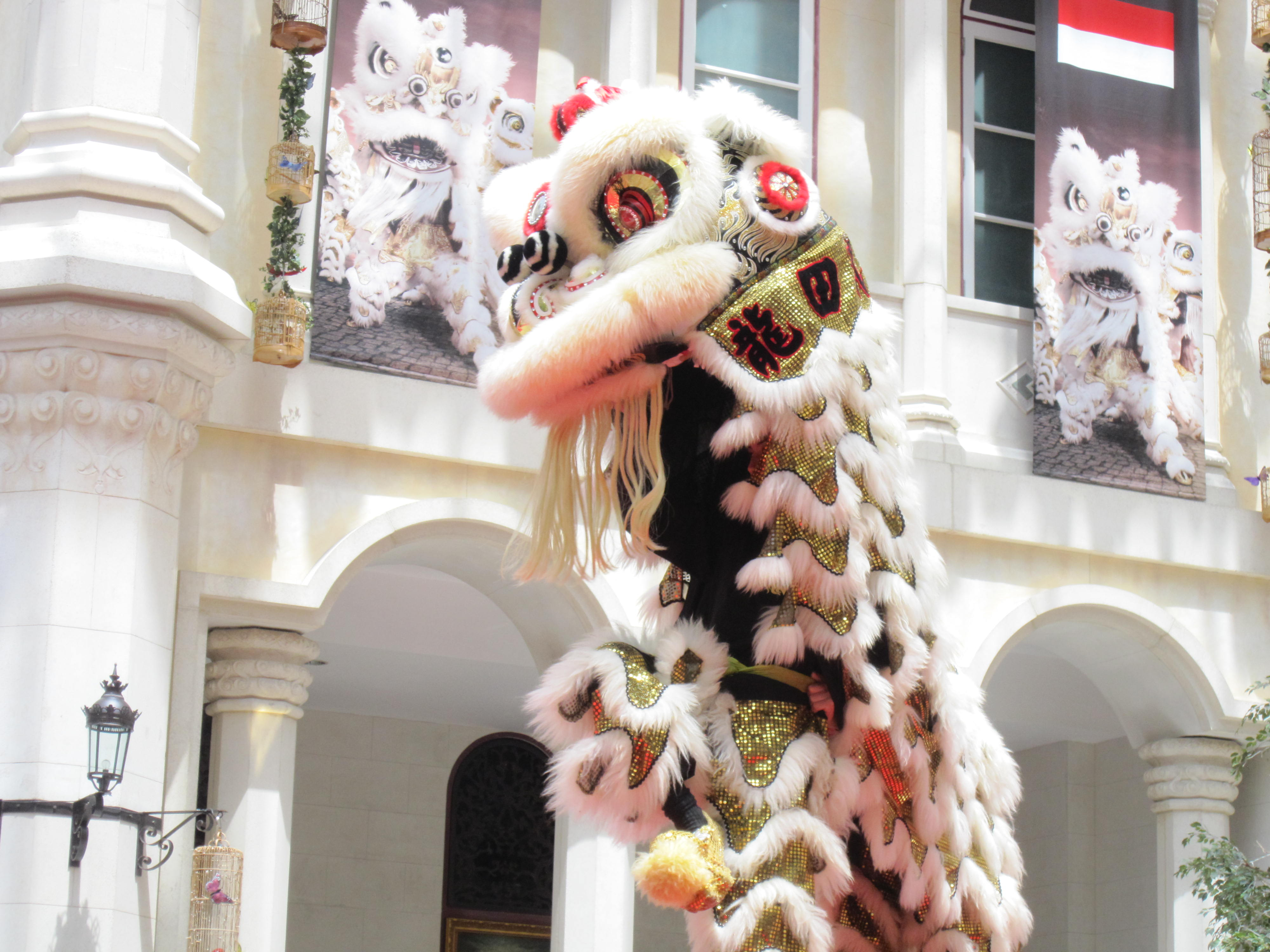
A lion dance

The lion dance has been suggested to have been introduced from outside China as lion is not native to China, and the Chinese word for lion itself, shi (獅), may have been derived from the Persian word šer. Detailed description of lion dances appeared during the Tang dynasty and it was then recognized as a foreign import, but the dance may have existed in China as early as the third century CE. Suggested origin of the dance include India and Persia, and during the Northern and Southern dynasties it had association with Buddhism. In the Tang court, the lion dance was called the Great Peace Music (太平樂) or the Lion Dance of the Five Directions (五方師子舞) where five large lions of different colours, each over 3 metres tall and each had 12 "lion lads" with the lions being teased by performers holding red whisks. Another version was performed by two persons, and was described by Tang poet Bai Juyi in his poem "Western Liang Arts" (西凉伎), where the dancers wear a lion costume made of a wooden head, a silk tail and furry body, with eyes gilded with gold and teeth plated with silver, and ears that move, a form that resembles today's Lion Dance. A variety of instruments are included in Lion dances. Some of these instruments include gongs, drums, and cymbals. All the music is synchronous with the movements in Lion dances. There are two main forms of the Chinese lion dance, the Northern Lion and Southern Lion. The Northern Lion looks more lifelike whereas the Southern Lion is less lifelike, but it holds more power. A form of the lion dance is also found in Tibet where it is called the Snow Lion Dance.

== See also ==
- Theatre of China
- History of dance
