= Square dancing (China) =

Exercise activity popular with older Chinese women

2013 video of square dancing in Shenzhen

In the People's Republic of China, square dancing or plaza dancing (simplified Chinese: 广场舞; traditional Chinese: 廣場舞; pinyin: guǎngchǎng wǔ; lit. 'public square dance'), is an exercise routine performed to music in squares, plazas or parks of the nation's cities. It is popular with middle-aged and retired women who have been referred to as "dancing grannies" in the English-language media. Due to its low cost and ease of participation, it has been estimated to have over 100 million practitioners, according to CCTV, the country's official television network.

The practice has roots in both ancient and modern Chinese history. Dancing for exercise has been recorded as developed millennia ago in Emperor Yao's China, and during the Song dynasty the public spaces of cities were noted for their use in performance. Most of the women who square dance came of age during the Cultural Revolution, when folk dances such as yangge were widely performed, often as propaganda. Some have confirmed that this nostalgia is one of their reasons for taking part, although the benefits of the exercise and socialization opportunities also play a role.

Square dancers dance to a variety of music, mostly Chinese popular songs, both contemporary and historic. The hobby began in the mid-1990s, as middle-aged women who had been forced into retirement began doing it to keep themselves occupied. Its popularity notwithstanding, square dancing has been the subject of considerable controversy in the 2010s China due to complaints of noise pollution in the evening or morning hours. Dancers in China's increasingly populous cities congregate in public areas because there are few dedicated facilities where they could go. Residents of nearby apartment complexes who have been disturbed by the high volume of multiple dance groups' musical accompaniment, especially late in the evening and early in the morning when they are trying to sleep, have sometimes reacted violently.

In 2015 the Chinese government reacted to these complaints and incidents by prescribing a set of standardized routines for all dancers to follow, claiming they would be culturally unifying and healthier. The move was met with widespread criticism. Some Chinese complained that it did nothing to address the noise issues; others said the dancers should be free to choose their own routines. The real problem, yet others said, was not only the lack of better places for the dancing but the lack of other social opportunities for the women. The government soon clarified that the routines it created and promoted were only meant to be healthy alternatives to existing ones and were not required.

== Form ==
The groups congregate in the early morning and evening, any time of year, at parks or public squares, or anywhere they can find enough space, regardless of what other use that space may nominally have, such as a parking lot. Morning dancers try to avoid parks since they are preferred locations for tai chi, the martial arts school whose slowed-down moves are often practiced as exercise, known as tai chi in the West. They begin as early as 5:30 a.m., and tend to use spaces nearer supermarkets so they are better positioned to bargain for and purchase fresh vegetables when the markets open. In the evening they tend to start dancing after dinner; for this reason spaces used by square dancers in the evening tend not to be too far from their homes as they also may have to tend to grandchildren they may be watching while their own children work late.

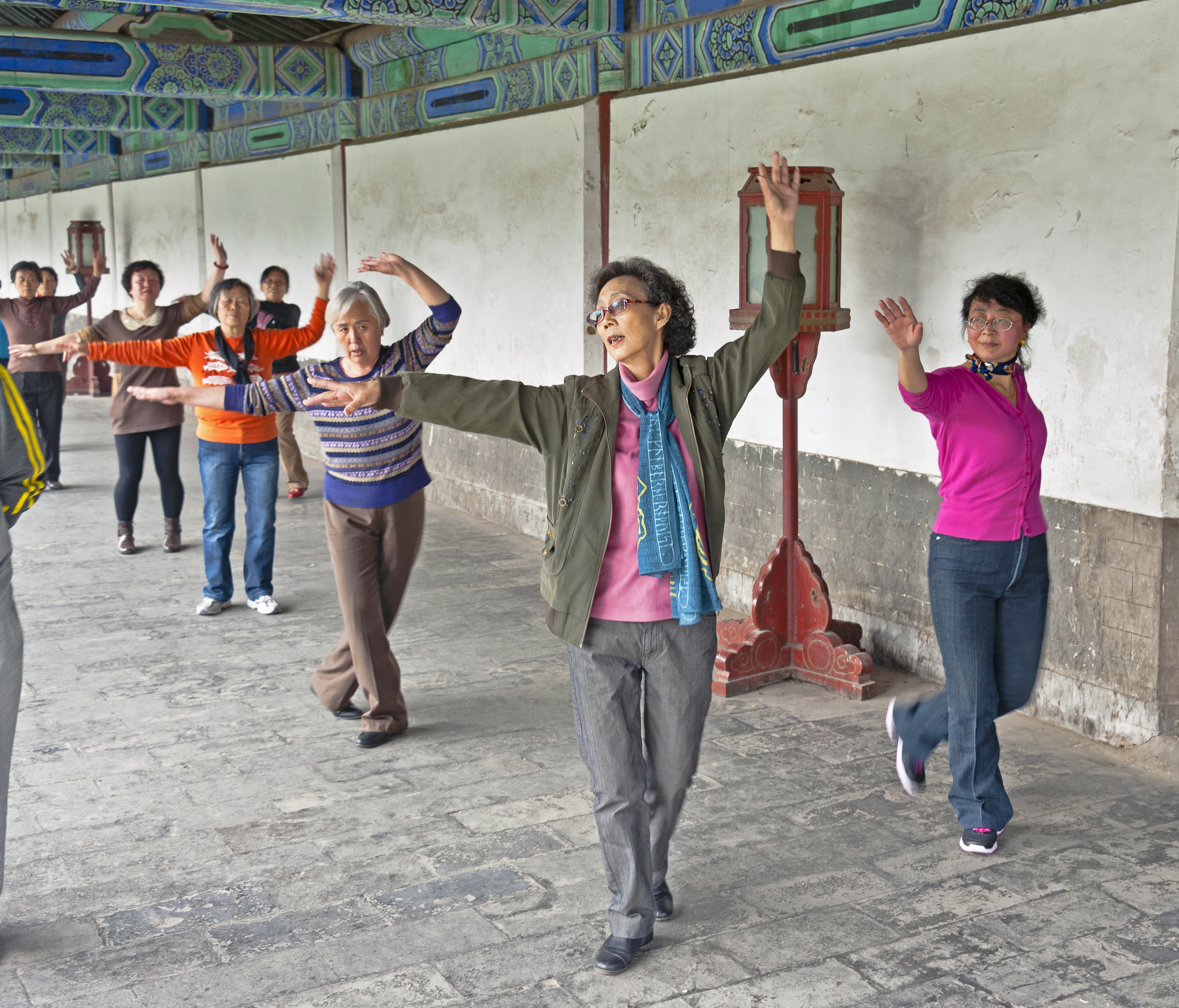
Older square dancers at Temple of Heaven Park in Beijing, 2014

Dancers organize themselves into rank and file. The front rank comprises the most proficient dancers, the best being in the center. Each rank back from the one in front contains dancer who are less proficient. All the dancers face forward. This allows dancers to learn from those in the rows ahead. The back rank is often populated with beginners just learning the moves, while the front rows are well-coordinated.

Some groups have gotten large, as many as 80 members in some cases. Leaders of these large groups charge a small fee to regular attendees to support the use of the electronics. It is reported as being either CN¥5 per month or ¥20 annually. One group in Changsha, however, was said to charge twice that.

Groups sometimes split if one experienced dancer feels she can lead a group of her own, especially if there are dancers dissatisfied with the current leaders' interpretation of the songs. Groups that form by such splits often consider themselves in competition. These can take the nature of friendly, organized events, or more serious competition for the best spaces available and the loudest sound.

Apparel varies greatly. Many groups' members show up in street clothes or exercise clothing similar to that worn for aerobics or yoga in the West. More advanced groups sometimes wear costumes and use props. The New York Times reported seeing one group in green fatigues, dancing to songs from the Korean War era. A Beijing group attracted international attention in summer of 2014 for performing Cultural Revolution-era songs like "Without the Communist Party, There Would Be No New China" outside a local shopping mall every night, wearing military uniforms and using toy guns as props.

The music is usually broadcast from a portable CD player and amplifier on wheels, powered by a large vehicle battery. Accompaniment varies. Some groups dance to Western pop or even waltzes, but most choose Chinese popular songs with a dance beat, such as the 2014 hit "Little Apple", or older hits from the 1950s, often with propagandist lyrics. Some dances are complicated and demanding, but the majority are low-impact routines that primarily consist of holding the dancer's arms in front of the body in varied positions. For this reason they are often referred to derisively as "zombie dances."

== Perceived benefits ==
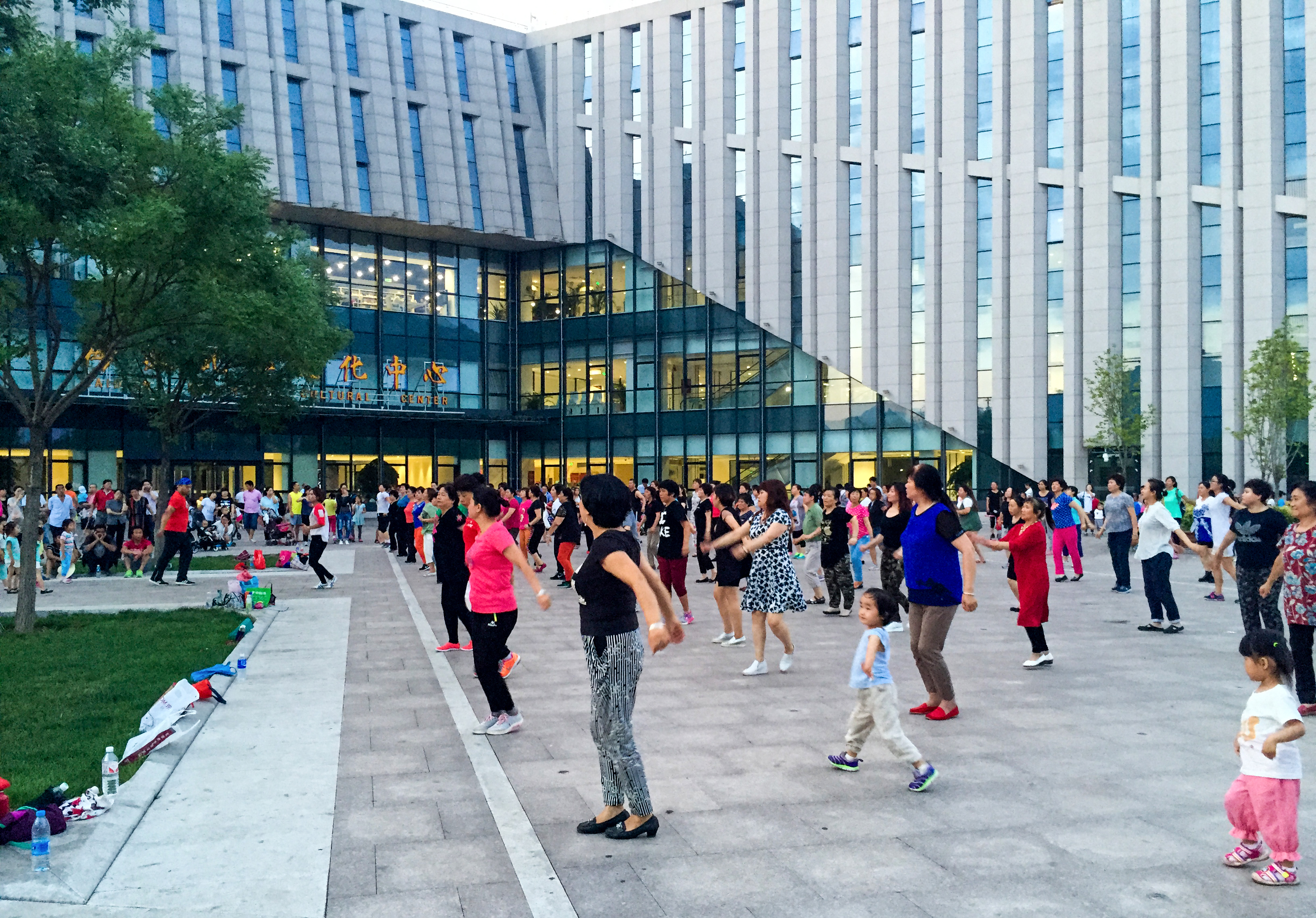
A mixed-age group of square dancers in Beijing, June 2017

"It's good for my health to be able to come out and exercise," a retiree told the Los Angeles Times. "I used to be quick to lose my temper, but now nothing bothers me," a similarly aged retired paper mill worker explained to The New York Times about the effect square dancing had had on her. "When I dance, I forget all my cares. And I can also hike up mountains with little effort."

A recent survey found that Shanghai residents have more tolerance for square dancing. According to the report, 75% of residents supported the group dancing, and 73% of young residents supported it. Beyond that, most residents said they thought guangchangwu is good for health, both mental and physical – 62% saw regular dancing as exercise and recreation, and 61% believed it helps elderly people expand their social circles and dispel loneliness.

== History ==
Dance as a form of exercise, has a long history in China. The Lüshi Chunqiu, an encyclopedia compiled in the third century B.C.E., during the Spring and Autumn period, describes how, two millennia earlier in the time of Emperor Yao, people began to dance slowly in order to reinvigorate their muscles after lengthy rains had kept them indoors, sometimes leading to joint diseases. Eventually they began dressing up in costumes and using props. "As time passed, they discovered that some activities could promote appetite, strengthen muscles and bones, and get rid of fatigue," writes one historian of Chinese traditional medicine. "Over a longer period of time, these activities became arranged in rhythms and movements which were harmonious and graceful—now they had dancing." While these may have eventually evolved into modern breathing exercises, other commentators suggest a public aspect to such dancing analogous to modern square dancing may have been refined in later eras, such as the religious dances of the Warring States period that preceded the rise of Imperial China. A writer in Youth Times sees it as similar to public dancing in the Song dynasty of the late first millennium C.E.

The origins of modern square dancing have been traced to the Cultural Revolution that swept China during the 1960s and early '70s, in the broader context of the country's urbanization. In 1949, the Chinese Communist Party (CCP) won the Chinese Civil War and established the People's Republic of China. A decade later, CCP chairman Mao Zedong began the Great Leap Forward economic development initiative to accelerate industrialize the Chinese economy. At the time most Chinese still lived in rural areas, as they had for centuries. Some had already moved to cities to take industrial jobs, but to better realize the aspirations of the Great Leap Forward, many of them moved or were forcibly relocated.

In cities during the Great Leap, there was an emphasis on collective use of public space even for activities that had usually taken place in the home. For example, entire neighborhoods were required to eat their dinner in public dining halls. Ultimately, the Great Leap Forward proved disastrous, failing to industrialize effectively and causing famine due to labor shortages on farms. In 1962, the government began allowing people to move back to farms.

Soon afterward, the Cultural Revolution began. Organized youth styling themselves the Red Guards revolted against both Chinese traditions and official Chinese communism, preferring the purity of Maoism. Since urban intellectuals' thought was believed to have been tainted by awareness or memory of capitalism, many were sent to rural areas to live, work and be properly re-educated through review of Mao's writings. This too caused great hardship and economic disruption.

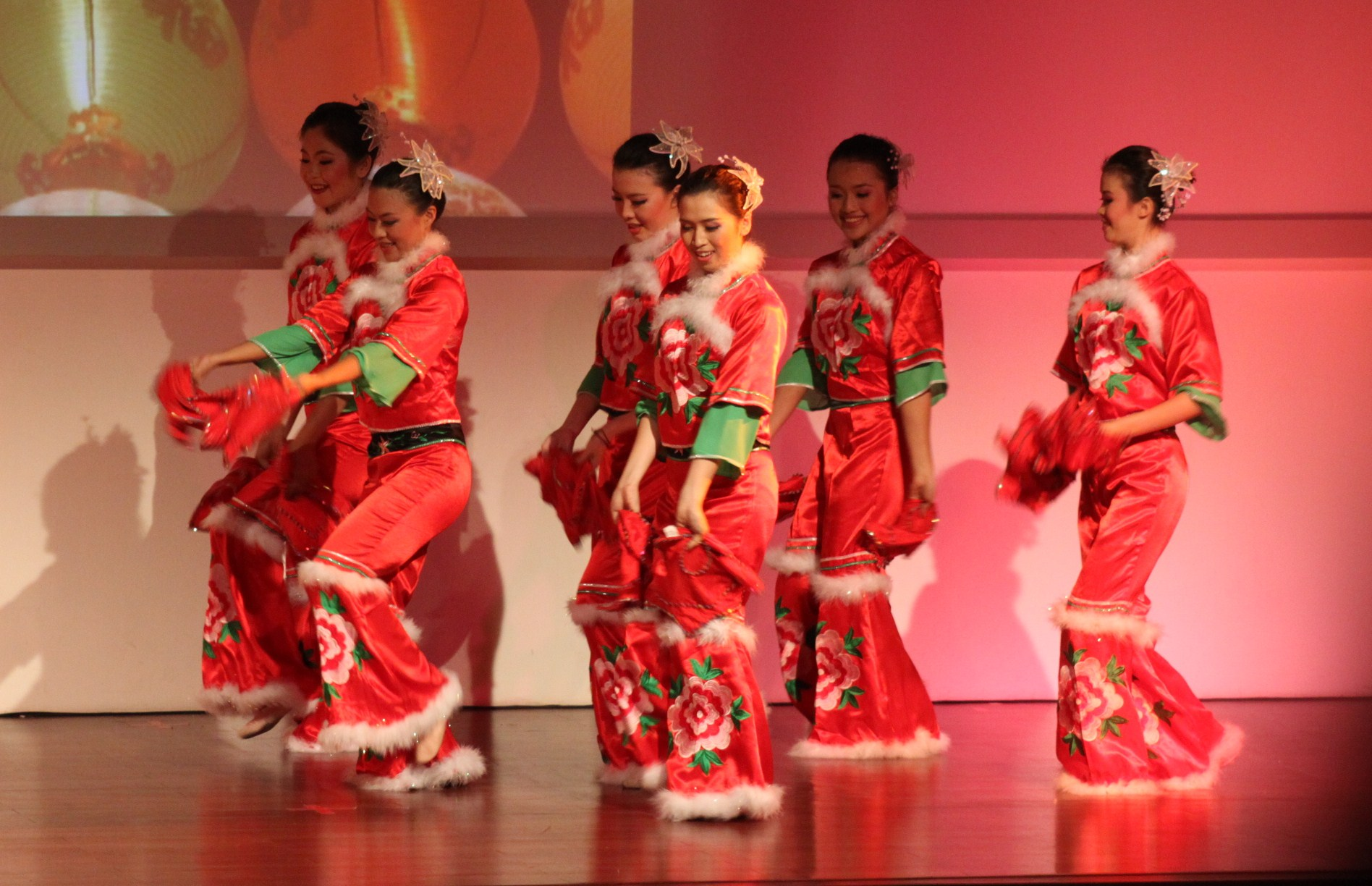
Yangge dancers

In the rural areas they were relocated to, the urbanites first encountered the yangge folk dance, very popular in rural areas, particularly in northern China. Originally performed to mark important agricultural occasions, yangge had been adapted by the CCP for its own uses as a propaganda tool. Performances often helped relieve tensions between the party and the peasantry during times when food was scarce, although during the more repressive period of the Cultural Revolution, yangge was itself banned along with many other traditional forms of expression.

The Cultural Revolution ended with Mao's death in 1976. Following the arrest and trial of the Gang of Four, including Mao's widow for perpetrating it, Deng Xiaoping took over as Chinese leader and instituted the reform and opening up which continues as "socialism with Chinese characteristics". The pace of urbanization picked up again afterwards. As younger Chinese moved from farms to cities, found jobs and started families, their parents often moved in with them to better supervise their grandchildren.

Foreign dance trends, such as ballroom, which had been suppressed during the Cultural Revolution, returned. Women who had experienced the brunt of the Cultural Revolution and its dislocations in their teens and young adulthood, including the exposure to and participation in yangge performances, began to reach mandatory retirement age in the mid-1990s, or were laid off from state-run enterprises following privatization. Some also began experiencing marital stress as husbands began having extramarital affairs with younger women, left home for long periods of time to work elsewhere, or both. They returned to dance as a way to stay fit, relieve boredom and socialize.

Some dancers themselves make this historical connection. "When I do the dances, it reminds me of my younger years when I was doing similar dances during the Cultural Revolution," a retired driver in her mid-60s told the Los Angeles Times in 2014. "I feel the same kind of spirit and emotions." Another woman, whose troupe used the "red songs" written during that era, was more political. "The[y] can always remind us what the Chinese leaders did for us to have a good life today and how they fought hard for the ordinary people in China."

The cities they were living in, however, lacked sufficient space for such activities. Chinese urban planners had prioritized commerce and industry, often demolishing older neighborhoods with small houses and replacing them with large high-rise apartment complexes, increasing population density. Streets were widened to accommodate automobile traffic, driving many activities that had once taken place there elsewhere. Although there were parks, there were severe shortages of urban open space, especially in rapidly growing cities. The small city of Xuanhua northwest of Beijing had, as of 2013, a mere 1.2 square metres (13 sq ft) of open space per resident, far below the 9-square-metre (97 sq ft) suggested by the World Health Organization, as compared with 11.2 square metres (121 sq ft) per resident in Beijing and 20 square metres (220 sq ft) in New York or 90 square metres (970 sq ft) in Warsaw.

At first, they joined older Chinese in practicing tai chi and the newer practices of Falun Gong. Tai chi's philosophy strongly encourages its practice in parks, closer to nature, and space there was scarce. Falun Gong was outlawed by the government in 1999, eliminating that option for exercise. So, the women, referred to as damas (simplified Chinese: 大妈; traditional Chinese: 大媽; lit. 'great mothers'), often rendered in the English press as "grannies", began finding their own spaces to dance in the way they had in their youth.

The damas ranks continued to grow along with China's cities. By 2008 half of the country's population was living in an urban environment. That year they received unintentional official encouragement when the government promoted fitness all over the country in anticipation of that year's Olympics in Beijing.

== Conflicts and controversy ==
In the 2010s square dancing began to draw notice both in China and abroad. A Jiangsu TV network sponsored a contest, drawing participants from seven cities. Its successful broadcast drew more participants into the squares and plazas. In 2014 the Chopstick Brothers featured square dancers in the video for their hit song "Little Apple"; the dancers returned the favor by making it a popular tune for their routines.

However, square dancers also came into conflict with residents of the areas that surrounded their preferred spaces. Many were younger workers who complained that this noise pollution kept them or their families from getting needed rest, especially if different groups of dancers began turning their music up to compete with each other. "One man bouncing his infant daughter says he fears the first words she will speak are the saccharine lyrics that waft in daily through the walls and windows," the BBC reported in 2013. The dancers also drew complaints that they blocked building entrances, sidewalks or parking lots.

The annoyed residents have sometimes taken it upon themselves to quiet the dancers' din. In Wenzhou, one group pooled the equivalent of US$40,000 to purchase a sound system of their own, loudly reminding dancers to comply with Chinese noise pollution laws. Wuhan residents threw human excrement on dancers from the tops of their neighboring towers. In a 2013 incident that gained national attention, a man in Beijing's outlying Changping District was arrested after he fired a shotgun in the air and set his three Tibetan Mastiffs on a nearby group of dancers.

Large dance in a public square

Altercations have even arisen among the dancers themselves. In Qingyuan, two groups of rival dancers allegedly came to blows when they tried to share a small space at a local park. A court ordered one group to pay the other's medical costs.

Dancers have also taken their dances overseas. A dance on Moscow's Red Square provided no incident, but other square dancers have not been so lucky in other countries (similarly, Russians visiting cities in Manchuria have joined in the square dances). Two mainland Chinese women visiting Taipei decided to do their dance in the hotel lobby, attracting attention from guests there and causing friction with hotel management. A group dancing in Sunset Park, home of one of the earliest Chinatowns in the New York City borough of Brooklyn, made headlines in August 2014 when its leader was arrested for violating a city ordinance forbidding sounds over 45 decibels; the charge was later dropped.

Square dancers' response to clashes with residents over noise has been mixed. While one group of dancers in Xi'an's Weiyang District voluntarily agreed to limit its routines to certain times and noise levels, others have been more defiant. "The louder the music, the more fun it is," one dancer told The New York Times in 2015. Song Jiahong, a humanities professor at Yunnan University, says this apparent insensitivity to loud noise is another effect of the Cultural Revolution, when propaganda read over loudspeakers was a constant feature of daily Chinese life. "The intimate memories of the loudspeakers are lodged deep in the subconscious of the old Red Guards," he wrote. "They have no concept that this can actually annoy others."

But other analysts wrote that the problem went deeper than this insensitivity. Tong writes:

As square dancing continues to flourish in the urban environment, the dancing activity happening on found and loosened space (urban public space temporarily appropriated by residents to meet their needs) reveals the tension between how the modern city is imagined and constructed, and how the real city is remade and lived in by common people, especially our elderly square dancers.

As a remedy that his home city of Xuanhua could implement, he suggested closing off lanes of less busy streets in the neighborhoods favored by square dancers to create temporary pedestrian space. He estimated that this could provide up to 8.8 square metres (95 sq ft) per dancer in the city.

=== 2015 government response ===
In March 2015, two government agencies, the State General Administration of Sports and the Ministry of Culture, announced the development of 12 model square dancing routines it had hired and trained instructors to introduce around the country. "Dancing in public squares represents the collective aspect of Chinese culture, but now it seems that the overenthusiasm of participants has dealt it a harmful blow with disputes over noise and venues," explained Liu Guoyong, director of General Administration of Sports' public fitness department. "So we have to guide it with national standards and regulations." Xinhua, the government's press agency, explained that the new routines would help make square dancing "a nationally unified, scientifically crafted new activity that brings positive energy to the people." The announcement was accompanied by a video set to "Little Apple" demonstrating one of the new routines.

Despite the tension between square dancers and residents of the areas they danced in, most Chinese opposed the move and supported the square dancers' right to choose their own music and dances. "This isn't a business," one dancer told the Times. "Dancing is free and voluntary, so why does the government need to get involved?" Their disapproval was echoed in some of the country's media. "What the grannies need are venues, not regulated routines," said RedNet, an online news portal. "Only an increase of public sports venues can satisfy urban and rural residents' need for fitness routines such as football and square-dancing, and lessen the phenomenon where square-dancing disturbs residents and takes up all the parks and public spaces." In Shanghai, the Xinmin Evening News pointed out that "The biggest tragedy is not the square dance by grannies, but the fact that grannies have nothing else to do than square-dance."

Other commentators expressed more practical concerns, such as whether the higher-impact routines were ideal for older women. "Who pays the medical bills if the grannies hurt themselves doing these?", asked one person on a CCTV social media site. Wang Guangcheng, the fitness trainer who developed the routines, said that concern was misplaced. None of the groups of dancers he tested them on had any complaints, he said. "Some even asked that the moves be more complicated."

Shortly afterwards, officials stated that the new routines were not meant to be the only ones permitted, contrary to what the original announcement had stated. "We saw that some people on the Internet were worried that the new regulations meant all over China people would only be allowed to dance these twelve routines," said Liu. "Of course that's impossible. It's a misunderstanding." Many Chinese took this to be a tacit admission that the hostile reaction to the routines and the sheer number of square dancers, meant that government realized it would be impossible to displace existing square-dance routines with its own.

Wang had earlier clarified that he designed the routines to provide fuller exercise than the ones he saw on the streets. His routines were designed to involve the entire body, and incorporate dance moves from styles the Chinese public was not yet widely familiar with such as salsa and the Zumba fitness routine. He hoped that the more intense routines would widen the demographic of square dancers. "I want to see more young people dancing in public squares."

== See also ==
- History of Chinese dance
- List of dances
- Pre-work assembly
- Radio calisthenics
- Social dance
- Street dance
