= Pre-work assembly =

Workplace management practice common in China

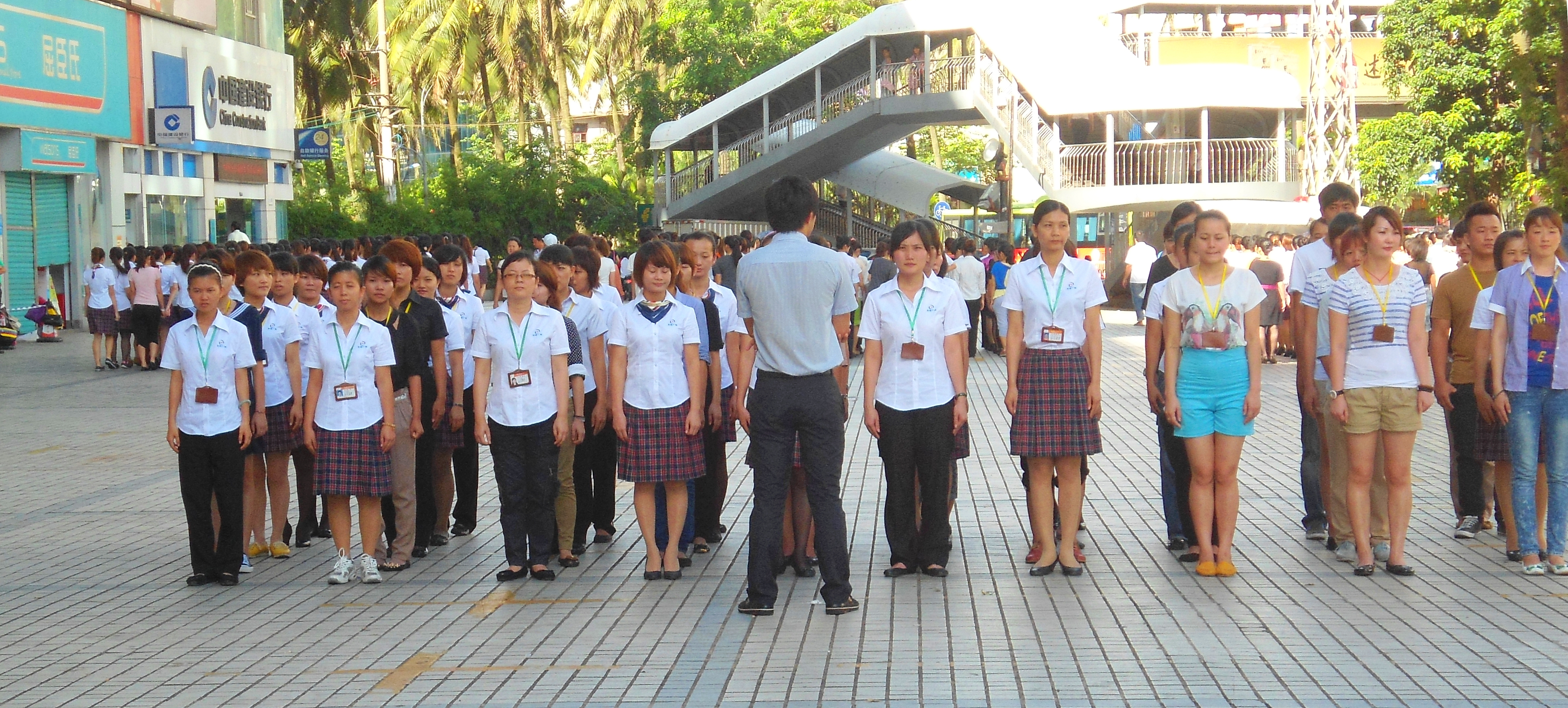
Mall workers standing in formation before their morning shift in Haikou, Hainan, China.

Throughout China, many organizations have their workers gather outdoors before their shift for a pre-work assembly. They stand at attention in formation, wearing their work uniforms, grouped by position in the company. They face one or two managers, who give guidance, critique, or encouragement. Other assemblies engage in Guangchangwu. A less common kind of assembly practices marching.

In public, urban settings, these assemblies are fairly common outside restaurants and hotels several minutes before the meal service begins.

The purpose of these assemblies is to build morale and cohesion among workers, while the physical exercise invigorates them. Although the assembly is considered a serious affair, the workers generally enjoy these gatherings.

== Gallery ==
Workers marching

Workers dancing in formation

== See also ==
- Square dancing (China)
- Dance squad
- Exhibition drill
- Lockstep
- Morale
- Radio calisthenics
- School assembly
