= Bankhead, Atlanta =

Bankhead
- Neighborhood
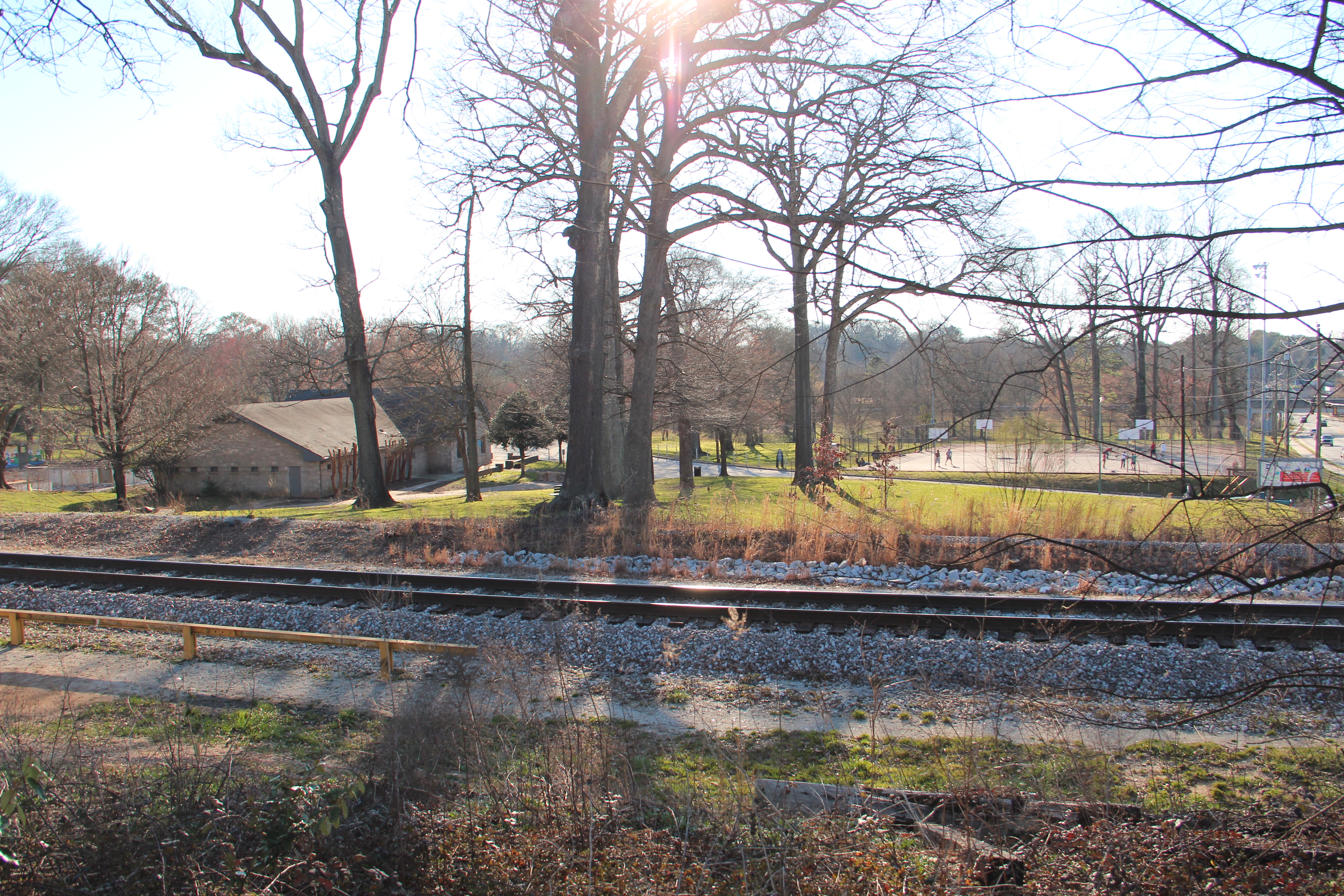
- Maddox Park

- Location in Atlanta Location in Georgia Location in the United States
- Coordinates: 33.77155°N 84.41918°W
- Country: United States
- State: Georgia
- City: Atlanta
- Time zone: UTC-5 (EST)
  - Summer (DST): UTC-4 (EDT)

Bankhead is a neighborhood located west of downtown Atlanta, Georgia. It is surrounded by Grove Park to the west, Washington Park and Hunter Hills to the south. To the east and northeast are Hills Park, Knight Park, English Avenue and Blandtown. It is also flanked by Rockdale to the northwest. At its center is MARTA's Bankhead station and the city's Maddox Park. The neighborhood schools are The B.E.S.T. Academy, Grove Park Elementary, A.D. Williams Elementary School, Carter G. Woodson Elementary School, Alfred Blalock Elementary School, and Frederick Douglass High School.

The neighborhood's name comes from Bankhead Highway, a thoroughfare that has since been renamed the Donald Lee Hollowell Parkway (for a civil rights attorney who lived near Bankhead in the nearby affluent and historic Collier Heights neighborhood).

The boundaries of Bankhead are Jefferson Street to the north (a few blocks North of Donald Lee Hollowell Parkway), Joseph E. Boone Blvd to the south, Joseph E. Lowery Blvd to the east and Chappell Rd to the west.

== Culture ==
Bankhead is also the former home to artists T.I., Young Dro, P$C, Dem Franchize Boyz, Shop Boyz, D4L, Shawty Lo, and current rapper, Lil RT .

The 1990s Bankhead Bounce dance, performed by Michael Jackson at the 1995 MTV Music Video Awards, was named after the neighborhood.

== See also ==
- Bankhead Courts - a demolished public housing complex.
