= Vernacular culture =

Cultural form

Vernacular culture is the cultural forms made and organised by ordinary, often indigenous people, as distinct from the high culture of an elite. One feature of vernacular culture is that it is informal. Such culture is generally engaged in on a non-profit and voluntary basis; it is rarely funded by the state.

The term is used in the modern study of geography and cultural studies. It generally implies a cultural form that differs markedly from deeply rooted folk culture, as well as from tightly organised subcultures and religious cultures. In cultural and communication studies, vernacular rhetoric is the discursive aspect of vernacular culture, referring to "mundane, bottom-up, and informal discursive expressions that challenge and criticize the institutional".

== Examples ==
- the making and shaping of personal gardens, market garden allotments
- amateur photography, family albums
- scrapbooking
- the making and showing of home movies
- self-organising creative circles, such as for knitting, sewing, quilting, storytelling, photography, dance, and painting
- amateur dramatics and youth dance groups
- local history and historical re-enactment groups
- book reading and discussion circles
- local horticultural produce and pet shows
- inventor groups, and leagues of amateur robot builders
- amateur beauty pageants
- local food networks and "annual dinners"
- informal investment clubs, which meet regularly in a social setting to jointly decide which stocks and investment vehicles to invest their money in
- fetes, parades, seasonal and traditional celebrations
- children's street culture
- parent-organised informal child sports and gym teams
- roadside shrines to traffic victims, and small self-made shrines at gravesites
- some forms of weblog, internet culture, or participatory media.

One could also include the design of home-made vernacular signage and notices

Some of these activities, such as gardens, family albums, and grave memorials, will be organized at the family level. Larger activities are usually organized through informal variations of the British committee system, consisting of a chairperson, secretary, treasurer, agenda, minutes, and an annual meeting with elections based on a quorum.

== See also ==
- Vernacular (disambiguation)
- Vernacular dance
- Vernacular literature
- Vernacular architecture
- Spirit of place
- Grassroots
- Stuckism
