= Vernacular dance =

Naturally developed dances within a particular community

Vernacular dances are dances which have developed 'naturally' as a part of 'everyday' culture within a particular community. In contrast to the elite and official culture, vernacular dances are usually learned naturally without formal instruction, along with other concepts of vernacular culture.

The word 'vernacular' is used here in much the same as it is in reference to vernacular language, defined in contrast to literary or cultured language.

Vernacular dances in urban context are commonly referred to as street dances.

Some folklorists suggest the term as a more universal replacement of the term "folk dance", while others use it to better delineate the concept of folk dance.

The term is attributed to Marshall and Jean Stearns (1968), who used this term to characterize jazz dance (in its "street" form, in contrast to the show biz form).

== See also ==
- List of street and vernacular dances
