= Street dance =

Vernacular dance in an urban context

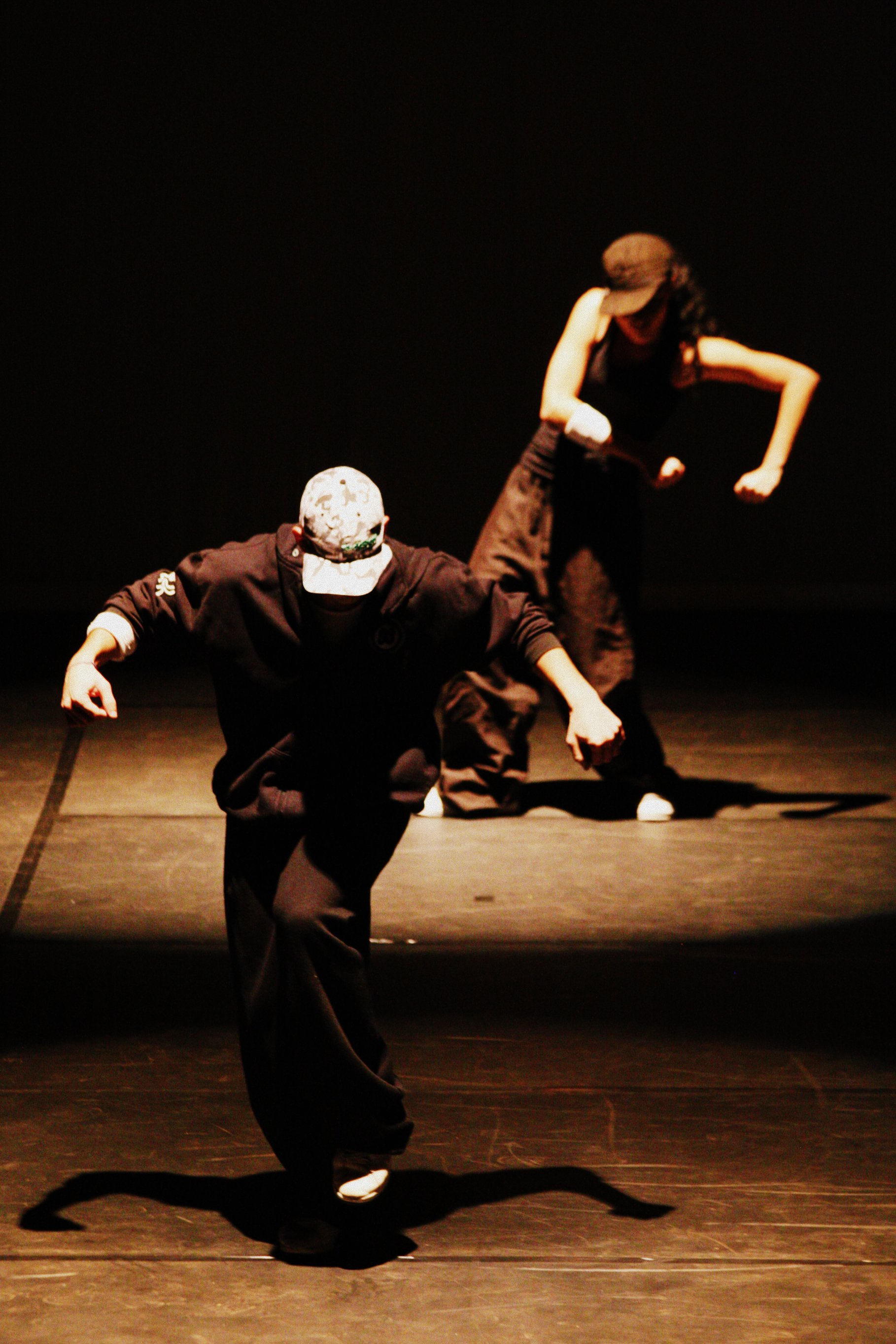
Two street dancers performing in the URBANOS Dance Contest in Brazil

Street dance is an umbrella term for a large number of social dance styles such as: breakdancing, popping, locking, house dance, waacking, voguing, hip-hop dance, etc. Social dance styles have many accompanying steps and foundations, created organically from a culture, a moment in time, a way of life, influenced by natural social interaction. A street dance is a vernacular dance in an urban context. Vernacular dances are often improvisational and social in nature, encouraging interaction and contact with spectators and other dancers. These dances are a part of the vernacular culture of the geographical area that they come from.

== History ==
Street dance evolved during the 1970s outside dance studios in any available open space. This includes streets, dance parties, block parties, parks, school yards, raves, and nightclubs. This is partly because African Americans who created the style were generally not accepted into dance studios because of their race. A significant feature of street dance is that it was historically a dance of young people offering a sense of freedom and giving a 'voice' to unrepresented communities.

Due to the mix of styles within street dance, its origin can not be traced to one precise area, however, America is the birthplace of most street styles. Breakdance originated in the Bronx and Lite Feet emerged in Harlem, both in New York City, while popping and locking developed during the 1970s funk era in California, USA. Clogging, which evolved in the streets and factories of Northern England in the mid-19th century, is an early form of street dance.

== See also ==
- List of street and vernacular dances
- List of ethnic, regional, and folk dances sorted by origin
- Dj Kool Herc
- "Boogaloo Sam" Solomon
- Popin' Pete
- Don Campbell
- Willi Ninja
