= Bankhead Bounce =

American dance

The Bankhead Bounce is a dance that originated in a neighborhood on the west side of Atlanta known as Bankhead. The dance was popularized by a song named "Wassup Wassup" by A-Town Players (rapper L. "Diamond" Atkins, featuring D-Roc) that was released in 1995. Within the same year, rap group Outkast released the song "Benz or Beamer", in which the song's music video features D-Roc performing the Bankhead bounce. The dance is performed by moving one's shoulders up and down with arms bent toward the chest. The Bankhead Bounce was further popularized when Michael Jackson did the dance during his performance at the 1995 MTV Video Music Awards.

== Background ==
The discovery of the dance occurred when Kevin Lee, a music manager, visited a night club called Bounce in Bankhead, Atlanta.

Other than musical artists performing the dance, it has become popular in dance fitness routines made popular by Atlanta-based African-American dancers. Bankhead Bounce became known in Atlanta’s African-American culture due to choreographer Rennie Harris, a collaborator of Run-DMC.
