= Radio calisthenics =

Exercise routines distributed by radio

Two men do rajio taisō in a park

Radio calisthenics (ラジオ体操, rajio taisō; literally, "radio exercises") are warm-up calisthenics performed to music and guidance from radio broadcasts. Originating from the United States, they are popular in Japan and parts of China, North Korea and Taiwan.

== United States ==
The idea for radio broadcast calisthenics came from "setting-up exercises" broadcast in US radio stations as early as 1923 in Boston (in WGI). The longest-lasting of these setting-up exercise broadcasts was sponsored by the Metropolitan Life Insurance Company (now MetLife), which sponsored the setting-up exercise broadcasts in WEAF in New York which premiered in April 1925. The MetLife-sponsored program—officially known as the Metropolitan Life Health Exercises but later known as the "Tower Health Exercises", after the tower where the exercises were broadcast from—was also broadcast in WCAP in Washington, D.C., and WEEI in Boston, among others.

== Japan ==
In Japan, radio calisthenics are broadcast to music on public NHK radio and television early in the morning, and is a rare example of a sponsored program in the NHK (the sponsor being the Japan Post Insurance Co.). ラジオ体操 (Rajio taisō) were introduced to Japan in 1928 as a commemoration of the enthronement of Emperor Hirohito; an employee of the Japanese postal insurance division (predecessor to the Japan Post Insurance Co.)—originally dispatched to MetLife to study the insurance system in the US—found out about the Tower Health Exercises and immediately brought samples of the exercises from MetLife back to Japan. The exercises were widely used to improve the overall health of the Japanese soldiers both at home and abroad during the 1930s and 1940s. The exercises were introduced to several other pacific nations, including Taiwan, Hong Kong and Indonesia during Japan's colonization period.

After Japan's defeat in 1945, the broadcasts were banned by the occupying powers for being too militaristic in nature. After several rewrites to the exercise routine, it was reintroduced by NHK radio in 1951 with the support of the education ministry, health ministry, the Japan Gymnastic Association and the Japan Recreation Association.

Radio taisō is still used at schools as a warm up for physical education classes and during sports day activities. It is also implemented by some companies as a way of building morale and a sense of group unity, as well as to raise energy levels and encourage good health.

== China ==
China also has such calisthenics. They have been mandatory in some regions since 2010. Originally they were introduced by Mao Zedong in 1951 but the broadcasts are now run by the General Administration of Sport of China.

== Great Britain ==
In December 1939, the BBC introduced 10 minute radio calisthenic programmes. They were titled 'Up in the Morning Early' and were broadcast on the Home Service at 7:35 Monday to Saturday. Monday, Wednesday and Friday's programmes were aimed at men and Tuesday, Thursday and Saturday's for women.

== See also ==
- Pre-work assembly
