= Waacking =

Type of dance

An example of waacking

Waacking (also whacking) is a street dance style with origins stemming from punking, a dance created in the gay clubs of Los Angeles during the 1970s disco era. The style is typically done to 1970s disco and 1980s post-disco music and is mainly distinguishable by its rotational arm movements, posing and emphasis on expressiveness.

== History ==
In the early 1970s a dance style known as punking emerged, with "punk" being a derogatory term for gay men at the time. The term "whack" was a specific movement within the punking style which involved moving the arms over the head in a rhythmic fashion. Although the wider club-going community took part in punking, they did not want the dance to have negative connotations attached to it and therefore renamed the genre "Waackin". Later, dancer and singer-songwriter Jeffrey Daniel added the "g" to waackin to make it "waacking", the name by which the style is commonly known today. The terms 'Whacking' and 'Wacking' are also occasionally used to refer to the dance style.

The originators of waacking were said to have danced to underground and imported Disco music, which was often sped up to create a more energetic atmosphere on the dance floor. The style remained largely underground until it became popularized by the American music-dance television program Soul Train and influenced the creation of The Outrageous Waacking Dancers, a Los Angeles–based waacking dance group. In the 2010s, the style gained renewed attention through the American TV series So You Think You Can Dance in 2011, when a waacking dance routine was choreographed by Kumari Suraj. Over time the dance style has received growing recognition and has been incorporated by dance programs such as the Department for Theatre and Dance at University of South Carolina.

== Influences ==
As with many other street dance styles that emerged from the late 20th century, waacking picked up various influences from other forms of movement and dance such as jazz, gymnastics and martial arts. Its visual similarities with the dance style locking can be attributed to the fact that both styles were developed around the same period of time in the Los Angeles club scene. The main differences lie within the communities that created them. Whereas waacking was created mainly in LGBT clubs, locking was created by the wider club-going community. Furthermore, the music of the two styles differs, in which waacking uses disco and locking uses funk music.

Another big influence on waacking was Hollywood, whereby dancers took inspiration stylistically from movie stars such as Lauren Bacall, Marlene Dietrich, Bette Davis, and James Dean. These inspirations manifested themselves not only through the movements and poses but also through other aspects of the dance such as dress styles and facial expressions.

In modern pop culture, the style of dance is famously likened to the movements of the character Garnet in the cartoon show Steven Universe as a catalyst for many of her magical powers, including summoning magical weapons and fusing with other characters.

During the 2022 Winter Olympics, the ice dance duo Gabriella Papadakis and Guillaume Cizeron famously won the gold medal and set a world record with a short program mainly influenced by waacking (choreographed by Axelle Munezero). They stated in an interview the primary choice (while training with Kim Gingras) was voguing, but shifted to waacking when their coach Marie-France Dubreuil brought the idea.

== See also ==
- Locking (dance)
