= 1999 Webby Awards =

US internet awards ceremony

The 1999 Webby Awards were held on March 18, 1999, at the Herbst Theater (War memorial Opera House) in San Francisco, California. IDG, which still owned the awards organization, continued to retain Tiffany Shlain to produce the awards even though the magazine division she had been working for had been shut down. Mayor Rudy Giuliani had lobbied to move the ceremony to New York City, but San Francisco Mayor Willie Brown interceded with Schlain by promising the city's support, including hosting a post-award party at the newly remodeled City Hall.

The event was noted for the famous incident in which a representative of Jodi.org, which had won in the arts category, called the event participants "Ugly corporate sons-of-bitches" in his acceptance speech and tossed his trophy to the audience. The organizers asked PricewaterhouseCoopers to tabulate and ensure security for the "People's Voice" winners, chosen by online voting.

== Nominees and winners ==
(from )

Category	Webby Award winner	People's Voice winner	Other nominees
Art	jodi.org (Archived 22 April 1999 via Wayback)	Doors of Perception (Archived 9 February 1999 via Wayback)	Last Will and Testament (Archived 8 February 1999 via Wayback)
Art	jodi.org (Archived 22 April 1999 via Wayback)	Doors of Perception (Archived 9 February 1999 via Wayback)	SFMOMA Presents Bill Viola (Archived 12 October 1999 via Wayback)
Art	jodi.org (Archived 22 April 1999 via Wayback)	Doors of Perception (Archived 9 February 1999 via Wayback)	The multi-cultural Recycler (Archived 17 January 1999 via Wayback)
Commerce	Amazon.com (Archived 18 February 1999 via Wayback)	eBay (Archived 22 February 1999 via Wayback)	CDNOW (Archived 20 February 1999 via Wayback)
Commerce	Amazon.com (Archived 18 February 1999 via Wayback)	eBay (Archived 22 February 1999 via Wayback)	The Gap Online (Archived 18 April 1999 via Wayback)
Commerce	Amazon.com (Archived 18 February 1999 via Wayback)	eBay (Archived 22 February 1999 via Wayback)	The Tire Rack (Archived 22 April 1999 via Wayback)
Community	SeniorNet (Archived 22 April 1999 via Wayback)	iVillage.com (Archived 22 April 1999 via Wayback)	MiningCo.com (Archived 20 February 1999 via Wayback)
Community	SeniorNet (Archived 22 April 1999 via Wayback)	iVillage.com (Archived 22 April 1999 via Wayback)	Talk City (Archived 24 April 1999 via Wayback)
Community	SeniorNet (Archived 22 April 1999 via Wayback)	iVillage.com (Archived 22 April 1999 via Wayback)	Third Age (Archived 24 February 1999 via Wayback)
Education	Journey North (Archived 27 April 1999 via Wayback)	N/A	Kathy Schrock's Guide for Educators (Archived 20 April 1999 via Wayback)
Education	Journey North (Archived 27 April 1999 via Wayback)	N/A	The Global Schoolhouse (Archived 18 April 1999 via Wayback)
Education	Journey North (Archived 27 April 1999 via Wayback)	N/A	The Math Forum (Archived 18 April 1999 via Wayback)
Education	Journey North (Archived 27 April 1999 via Wayback)	N/A	Web66 (Archived 23 April 1999 via Wayback)
Fashion	PaperMag (Archived 24 February 1999 via Wayback)	London Fashion Week (Archived 22 April 1999 via Wayback)	Hint Magazine (Archived 24 February 1999 via Wayback)
Fashion	PaperMag (Archived 24 February 1999 via Wayback)	London Fashion Week (Archived 22 April 1999 via Wayback)	Lumiere (Archived 24 February 1999 via Wayback)
Fashion	PaperMag (Archived 24 February 1999 via Wayback)	London Fashion Week (Archived 22 April 1999 via Wayback)	w.&l.t. online (Archived 25 February 1999 via Wayback)
Financial Services	The Motley Fool (Archived 24 February 1999 via Wayback)		ClearStation (Archived 22 April 1999 via Wayback)
Financial Services	The Motley Fool (Archived 24 February 1999 via Wayback)		E-Loan (Archived 24 February 1999 via Wayback)
Financial Services	The Motley Fool (Archived 24 February 1999 via Wayback)		Investor Home (Archived 2 March 1999 via Wayback)
Financial Services	The Motley Fool (Archived 24 February 1999 via Wayback)		The Wall Street Journal (Archived 21 February 1999 via Wayback)
Games	Gamers Central (Archived 24 February 1999 via Wayback)	N/A	Digital Addiction (Archived 20 April 1999 via Wayback)
Games	Gamers Central (Archived 24 February 1999 via Wayback)	N/A	Java on the Brain (Archived 18 April 1999 via Wayback)
Games	Gamers Central (Archived 24 February 1999 via Wayback)	N/A	Multiple Arcade Machine Emulator (Archived 22 April 1999 via Wayback)
Games	Gamers Central (Archived 24 February 1999 via Wayback)	N/A	ShockRave (Archived 17 April 1999 via Wayback)
Health	InteliHealth (Archived 22 April 1999 via Wayback)	Mayo Clinic Health Oasis (Archived 18 April 1999 via Wayback)	mediconsult.com (Archived 17 April 1999 via Wayback)
Health	InteliHealth (Archived 22 April 1999 via Wayback)	Mayo Clinic Health Oasis (Archived 18 April 1999 via Wayback)	onhealth (Archived 22 April 1999 via Wayback)
Health	InteliHealth (Archived 22 April 1999 via Wayback)	Mayo Clinic Health Oasis (Archived 18 April 1999 via Wayback)	thriveonline (Archived 22 April 1999 via Wayback)
Humor	The Onion (Archived 17 April 1999 via Wayback)		Bezerk (Archived 17 April 1999 via Wayback)
Humor	The Onion (Archived 17 April 1999 via Wayback)		Red Meat (Archived 8 February 1999 via Wayback)
Humor	The Onion (Archived 17 April 1999 via Wayback)		Suck (Archived 24 April 1999 via Wayback)
Humor	The Onion (Archived 17 April 1999 via Wayback)		The Simpleton (Archived 25 February 1999 via Wayback)
Living	BabyCenter (Archived 2 March 1999 via Wayback)	Epicurious (Archived 2 March 1999 via Wayback)	Garden.com (Archived 8 February 1999 via Wayback)
Living	BabyCenter (Archived 2 March 1999 via Wayback)	Epicurious (Archived 2 March 1999 via Wayback)	The Knot (Archived 18 February 1999 via Wayback)
Living	BabyCenter (Archived 2 March 1999 via Wayback)	Epicurious (Archived 2 March 1999 via Wayback)	The Yuckiest Site on The Internet (Archived 24 April 1999 via Wayback)
Movie and Film	Internet Movie Database (Archived 1 September 1999 via Wayback)		Coming Attractions (Archived 20 February 1999 via Wayback)
Movie and Film	Internet Movie Database (Archived 1 September 1999 via Wayback)		Dark Horizons (http://www.darkhorizons.com)
Movie and Film	Internet Movie Database (Archived 1 September 1999 via Wayback)		Film.com (Archived 2 March 1999 via Wayback)
Movie and Film	Internet Movie Database (Archived 1 September 1999 via Wayback)		Ireland Film and Television Net (Archived 23 February 1999 via Wayback)
Music	SonicNet (Archived 23 April 1999 via Wayback)	mp3 (Archived 21 April 1999 via Wayback)	bobdylan.com (Archived 17 April 1999 via Wayback)
Music	SonicNet (Archived 23 April 1999 via Wayback)	mp3 (Archived 21 April 1999 via Wayback)	Spinner (Archived 9 February 1999 via Wayback)
Music	SonicNet (Archived 23 April 1999 via Wayback)	mp3 (Archived 21 April 1999 via Wayback)	The Ultimate Band List (Archived 18 April 1999 via Wayback)
News	CNN Interactive (Archived 20 June 2000 via Wayback)		BBC News Online (Archived 21 April 1999 via Wayback)
News	CNN Interactive (Archived 20 June 2000 via Wayback)		MSNBC (Archived 18 February 1999 via Wayback)
News	CNN Interactive (Archived 20 June 2000 via Wayback)		Rough & Tumble (Archived 10 February 1999 via Wayback)
News	CNN Interactive (Archived 20 June 2000 via Wayback)		The New York Times (Archived 23 February 1999 via Wayback)
Politics and Law	The California Voter Foundation (Archived 2 March 1999 via Wayback)	Free! The Freedom Forum Online (Archived 21 February 1999 via Wayback)	FindLaw (Archived 21 February 1999 via Wayback)
Politics and Law	The California Voter Foundation (Archived 2 March 1999 via Wayback)	Free! The Freedom Forum Online (Archived 21 February 1999 via Wayback)	OpenSecrets (Archived 8 February 1999 via Wayback)
Politics and Law	The California Voter Foundation (Archived 2 March 1999 via Wayback)	Free! The Freedom Forum Online (Archived 21 February 1999 via Wayback)	Web White & Blue (Archived 19 March 1999 via Wayback)
Print and Zines	Salon Magazine (Archived 17 April 1999 via Wayback)	Smithsonian Magazine (Archived 21 February 1999 via Wayback)	Feed (Archived 19 February 1999 via Wayback)
Print and Zines	Salon Magazine (Archived 17 April 1999 via Wayback)	Smithsonian Magazine (Archived 21 February 1999 via Wayback)	Nerve (Archived 21 February 1999 via Wayback)
Print and Zines	Salon Magazine (Archived 17 April 1999 via Wayback)	Smithsonian Magazine (Archived 21 February 1999 via Wayback)	Slate (Archived 23 April 1999 via Wayback)
Radio	Freespeech Internet Television (Archived 25 February 1999 via Wayback)	Spinner (Archived 9 February 1999 via Wayback)	ImagineRadio (Archived 24 February 1999 via Wayback)
Radio	Freespeech Internet Television (Archived 25 February 1999 via Wayback)	Spinner (Archived 9 February 1999 via Wayback)	Internet Underground Music Archive (Archived 25 February 1999 via Wayback)
Radio	Freespeech Internet Television (Archived 25 February 1999 via Wayback)	Spinner (Archived 9 February 1999 via Wayback)	SonicNet (Archived 23 April 1999 via Wayback)
Science	Exploratorium (Archived 25 February 1999 via Wayback)	NASA Space Science Laboratory (Archived 21 February 1999 via Wayback)	Scientific American (Archived 18 February 1999 via Wayback)
Science	Exploratorium (Archived 25 February 1999 via Wayback)	NASA Space Science Laboratory (Archived 21 February 1999 via Wayback)	The University of Arizona - The Biology Project (Archived 21 February 1999 via Wayback)
Science	Exploratorium (Archived 25 February 1999 via Wayback)	NASA Space Science Laboratory (Archived 21 February 1999 via Wayback)	Union of Concerned Scientists (Archived 19 February 1999 via Wayback)
Sports	SportsPages.com (Archived 22 April 1999 via Wayback)	The Sporting News (Archived 23 February 1999 via Wayback)	GolfWeb (Archived 20 February 1999 via Wayback)
Sports	SportsPages.com (Archived 22 April 1999 via Wayback)	The Sporting News (Archived 23 February 1999 via Wayback)	Quokka Sports (Archived 22 February 1999 via Wayback)
Sports	SportsPages.com (Archived 22 April 1999 via Wayback)	The Sporting News (Archived 23 February 1999 via Wayback)	SoccerNet (Archived 20 April 1999 via Wayback)
Television	PBS Online (Archived 2 March 1999 via Wayback)		Comedy Central (Archived 21 February 1999 via Wayback)
Television	PBS Online (Archived 2 March 1999 via Wayback)		Gist TV Listings (Archived 21 February 1999 via Wayback)
Television	PBS Online (Archived 2 March 1999 via Wayback)		TVGen (Archived 24 February 1999 via Wayback)
Television	PBS Online (Archived 2 March 1999 via Wayback)		UltimateTV (Archived 24 February 1999 via Wayback)
Travel	biztravel.com (Archived 22 April 1999 via Wayback)	Travelocity (Archived 12 December 1998 via Wayback)	Expedia Travel (Archived 20 February 1999 via Wayback)
Travel	biztravel.com (Archived 22 April 1999 via Wayback)	Travelocity (Archived 12 December 1998 via Wayback)	Lonely Planet On-line (Archived 24 February 1999 via Wayback)
Travel	biztravel.com (Archived 22 April 1999 via Wayback)	Travelocity (Archived 12 December 1998 via Wayback)	TerraQuest (Archived 2 March 1999 via Wayback)
Webby Technical Achievement	Amazon.com (Archived 18 February 1999 via Wayback)	My Yahoo! (Archived 8 February 1999 via Wayback)	AltaVista Translation with Systran (Archived 21 April 1999 via Wayback)
Webby Technical Achievement	Amazon.com (Archived 18 February 1999 via Wayback)	My Yahoo! (Archived 8 February 1999 via Wayback)	ConferenceTracker (http://N/A)
Webby Technical Achievement	Amazon.com (Archived 18 February 1999 via Wayback)	My Yahoo! (Archived 8 February 1999 via Wayback)	FedEx (Archived 24 February 1999 via Wayback)
Weird	Superbad.com (Archived 20 February 1999 via Wayback)	Absurd.org (Archived 20 February 1999 via Wayback)	Disinformation (Archived 22 April 1999 via Wayback)
Weird	Superbad.com (Archived 20 February 1999 via Wayback)	Absurd.org (Archived 20 February 1999 via Wayback)	Trepan.com (Archived 24 April 1999 via Wayback)
Weird	Superbad.com (Archived 20 February 1999 via Wayback)	Absurd.org (Archived 20 February 1999 via Wayback)	Unamerican Activities (Archived 21 February 1999 via Wayback)
