= List of Sharp mobile phones =

Sharp Corporation design and manufacture mobile phone handsets for the Japanese ('domestic') market and for overseas customers. Handset models produced include several distinct ranges:

== GX ==
- Sharp GX1: 'Candybar' style, operator O2-only, relatively small production run, launched October 2002
- Sharp GX10: 'Flip' style, sold >1 million units. 2003 3GSM World Congress Best Handset.
- Sharp GX10i
- Sharp GX10m
- Sharp GX10n
- Sharp GX12
- Sharp GX13
- Sharp GX15: 'Candybar' style, QQVGA screen. sold more than 3 million units.
- Sharp GX17: update version of GX15.
- Sharp GX18
- Sharp GX20: 'Flip' style, successor to GX10, 2G, tri-band GSM, launched 3Q 2003 - standby 220-250hr, video, infrared
- Sharp GX20n
- Sharp GX21
- Sharp GX22
- Sharp GX23
- Sharp GX25: 'Flip' style, fine pitch QVGA screen. sold more than 2 million.
- Sharp GX27
- Sharp GX29: Update version of GX25.
- Sharp GX30: 1st 1mega pixel camera phone for EU. Quad band GSM.
- Sharp GX30i
- Sharp GX31
- Sharp GX32
- Sharp GX33: Lowend tri band GSM phone.
- Sharp GX34: GX33 + memory card slot + MP3 player. Extremely rare.
- Sharp GX40

== SX ==
- Sharp SX33A
- Sharp SX313
- Sharp SX663
- Sharp SX813
- Sharp SX833
- Sharp SX862

== TM ==
- Sharp TM100: slider phone. EU only.
- Sharp TM150: T-Mobile USA-only model. 1.3Mpixel tri-band GSM phone.
- Sharp TM200: the first 2Mpixel GSM camera phone. Quite few production.

== WS ==
- Sharp WS003SH
- Sharp WS007SH
- Sharp WS011SH
- Sharp WS020SH

== WX ==
- Sharp WX-T81
- Sharp WX-T82
- Sharp WX-T91
- Sharp WX-T92
- Sharp WX-T825
- Sharp WX-T923
- Sharp WX-T930

== Other US Models ==
- Sharp Z800: Dual band CDMA phone, unique antenna position launched in March 2002.
- Sharp FX: Sidekick like style; MediaFlo W-CDMA phone for AT&T Mobility.
- Sharp FX Plus: Android phone for AT&T Mobility; no MediaFlo.

== Vodafone or other operators ==
- Sharp 802: marketed for Vodafone EU/NZ and Japan with different software and keypad.
- Sharp 902: marketed for Vodafone EU/NZ and Japan with different software and keypad.
- Sharp 903: marketed for Vodafone EU/NZ and Japan with different software and keypad.
- Sharp 804
- Sharp 550SH
- Sharp 770SH
- Sharp 703: marketed for Vodafone EU/NZ and Japan with different software and keypad.
- Sharp SX862/Sharp WX-T92
- Sharp SH6010C
- Sharp SH9020C/Sharp WX-T923
- Sharp SH1810C/Sharp WX-T930

== JDM (Japan Domestic Model) ==
SoftBank

- Sharp 705SH
- Sharp V801SH
- Sharp 813SH
- Sharp 814SH
- Sharp 815SH
- Sharp 816SH
- Sharp 820SH
- Sharp 821SH
- Sharp 822SH
- Sharp 880SH
- Sharp 904SH
- Sharp 905SH
- Sharp 910SH
- Sharp 911SH
- Sharp 912SH
- Sharp 913SH
- Sharp 913SH G-Type Char
- Sharp 920SH
- Sharp 922SH
- Sharp 923SH
- Sharp 930SH
- Sharp 931SH
- Sharp 932SH
- Sharp 933SH
- Sharp 934SH
- Sharp 935SH
- Sharp 936SH

NTT docomo

- Sharp SH-01A: Cycloid style, 8Mpixel CCD camera, biometrics authenticate, 3.2 inches 480×854 FWVGA MobileASV, Oneseg Digital-TV, DolbyMobile
- Sharp SH-02A: 5MPixel, OEL sub-display, 3 inches 480×854 FWVGA MobileASV, Oneseg Digital-TV
- Sharp SH-03A: 8Mpixel CCD camera, biometrics authenticate, 3 inches Touch Screen 480×854 FWVGA MobileASV, Oneseg Digital-TV, DolbyMobile
- Sharp SH-04A: 5Mpixel, QWERTY keyboard, 3.5 inch Touch screen 480×854 FWVGA MobileASV, Oneseg Digital-TV
- Sharp SH-05A: 8Mpixel, 3 inches screen 480×854 FWVGA MobileASV, Oneseg Digital-TV
- Sharp SH-06A: 10Mpixel CCD camera, 3.3 inches 480x 854 Touch Screen FWVGA, Oneseg Digital- TV, GPS, JAVA
- Sharp SH-07A: 10Mpixel CCD camera, 3.3 inches 480x 854 Touch Screen FWVGA
- Sharp SH-08A: 8Mpixel, 3 inches screen 480×854 FWVGA MobileASV, Oneseg Digital-TV, Solar recharge
- Sharp SH906i: 5Mpixel CMOS camera, 3 inches 480x 854 Touch Screen
- Sharp SH-01B: 12Mpixel CCD camera, 3.4 inches 480x 854 Screen FWVGA
- Sharp SH-02B: 8Mpixel CCD camera, 3.4 inches 480x 854 Screen FWVGA
- Sharp SH-02B marimekko Edition
- Sharp SH-03B: 5Mpixel CMOS camera, 3.7 inches 480x 854 Touch Screen FWVGA
- Sharp SH-04B: 8Mpixel CCD camera, 3.0 inches 480x 854 Screen FWVGA
- Sharp SH-05B: 5Mpixel CMOS camera, 3.0 inches 480x 854 Screen FWVGA
- Sharp SH-07B
- Sharp SH-08B
- Sharp SH-09B
- Sharp SH-10B
- Sharp SH-06B
- Sharp SH-01C
- Sharp SH-02C
- Sharp SH-03C
- Sharp SH-04C
- Sharp SH-05C
- Sharp SH-06C
- Sharp SH-08C
- Sharp SH-09C
- Sharp SH-10C
- Sharp SH-11C
- Sharp SH-12C Dual 8Mpixel, 4.2 inches 720 x 1280
- Sharp SH-13C
- Sharp SH-01D
- Sharp SH-02D
- Sharp SH-03D
- Sharp SH-04D
- Sharp SH-05D
- Sharp SH-06D: 8Mpixel, 4.5 inches, 720 x 1280
- Sharp SH-06D NERV Edition
- Sharp SH-07D
- Sharp SH-09D
- Sharp SH-10D
- Sharp SH-01E: Release in October 2012, 12M pixels CMOS camera, 4.1 inches 540x960 CG Silicon QHD, MSM8960 1.5 GHz (Dual-core), 1 GB RAM, 16 GB ROM, Max 64 GB microSDXC, Android 4.0
- Sharp SH-01E Vivienne Westwood Edition: Release in December 2012
- Sharp SH-02E: Release in November 2012, 16M pixels CMOS camera, 4.9 inches 720x1280 IGZO HD, APQ8064 1.5 GHz (Quad-core), 2 GB RAM, 32 GB ROM, Max 64 GB microSDXC, Android 4.0
- Sharp SH-03E: Release in December 2012, 5M pixels CMOS camera, 3.0 inches 480x854 FWVGA
- Sharp SH-04E: Release in January 2013, 13M pixels CMOS camera, 4.5 inches 720x1280 S-CG Silicon HD, APQ8064 1.5 GHz (Quad-core), 2 GB RAM, 16 GB ROM, Max 64 GB microSDXC, Android 4.1
- Sharp SH-05E: Release in February 2013, 12M pixels CMOS camera, 4.1 inches 540x960 CG Silicon QHD, MSM8960 1.5 MHz (Dual core), 1 GB RAM, 8 GB ROM, Max 64 GB microSDXC, Android 4.0, imadoco search
- Sharp SH-06E: Release in May 2013, 13M pixels CMOS camera, 4.8 inches 1080x1920 IGZO FHD (460 ppi), APQ8064T 1.7 GHz (Quad-core), 2 GB RAM, 32 GB ROM, Max 64 GB microSDXC, Android 4.2
- Sharp SH-07E: Release in June 2013, 13M pixels CMOS camera, 4.3 inches 720x1280 S-CG Silicon HD, APQ8064T 1.7 GHz (Quad-core), 2 GB RAM, 32 GB ROM, Max 64 GB microSDXC, Android 4.2
- Sharp SH-01F: Release in November 2013, 16M pixels CMOS camera, 5.01 inches 1080x1920 IGZO FHD (440 ppi), MSM8974 2.2 GHz (Quad-core), 2 GB RAM, 32 GB ROM, Max 64 GB microSDXC, Android 4.2
- Sharp SH-02F: Release in January 2014, 13M pixels CMOS camera, 4.52 inches 1080x1920 IGZO FHD (487 ppi), MSM8974 2.2 GHz (Quad-core), 2 GB RAM, 16 GB ROM, Max 64 GB microSDXC, Android 4.2.2
- Sharp SH-03F: Release in February 2014, 12M pixels CMOS camera, 4.1 inches 540x960 QHD, MSM8960 1.5 MHz (Dual core), 1 GB RAM, 8 GB ROM, Max 32 GB microSDHC, Androdid 4.0.4, imadoco search

== Powered by Danger Devices ==
- Danger Hiptop 2 / T-Mobile Sidekick 2
- Danger Hiptop 3 / T-Mobile Sidekick 3.
- Danger Hiptop ID / T-Mobile Sidekick ID
- Danger Hiptop LX / T-Mobile Sidekick LX
- Danger Hiptop 2008 / T-Mobile Sidekick (model 2008)

Note that Sharp is just a manufacturer of the t-mobile sidekick, which is designed by Danger.

Microsoft (Danger/PMX) KIN phones:

- Microsoft KIN One and Two

== Sharp Aquos Lineup (2013-present) ==
- Sharp Aquos Crystal SH825Wi (Indonesia only)
- Sharp Aquos Crystal 2
- Sharp Aquos Zero
- Sharp Aquos SH-01G
- Sharp Basio 2
- Sharp Aquos Simple Sumaho
- Sharp Aquos Simple Sumaho 2
- Sharp Aquos Simple Sumaho 3
- Sharp Aquos Simple Sumaho 4
- Sharp Aquos Simple Sumaho 5
- Sharp IS05
- Sharp Aquos wish
- Sharp Aquos wish2
- Sharp Aquos wish3
- Sharp Aquos wish4
- Sharp Aquos wish5
- Sharp Aquos wish5s
- Sharp Aquos zero2
- Sharp Aquos zero6
- Sharp Aquos V6
- Sharp Aquos V6 Plus
- Sharp Aquos BASIO active
- Sharp Aquos S2
- Sharp Aquos S3
- Sharp Aquos mini
- Sharp Aquos V
- Sharp Aquos sense basic
- Sharp Aquos sense2
- Sharp Aquos sense3
- Sharp Aquos sense3 plus
- Sharp Aquos sense4
- Sharp Aquos sense4 plus
- Sharp Aquos sense5G
- Sharp Aquos sense6
- Sharp Aquos sense7
- Sharp Aquos sense7 plus
- Sharp Aquos sense8
- Sharp Aquos sense9
- Sharp Aquos sense10
- Sharp Aquos D2
- Sharp Aquos D10
- Sharp Aquos B10
- Sharp Aquos C10
- Sharp Aquos S3 High
- Sharp Aquos Pi
- Sharp Aquos R1S
- Sharp Aquos Z3
- Sharp Aquos Z2
- Sharp Aquos MS1
- Sharp Aquos Xx
- Sharp Aquos Xx2
- Sharp Aquos Xx3 (notable for being the first smartphone in the world with 120Hz, 6 months earlier than the Razer Phone 1)
- Sharp Aquos R
- Sharp Aquos R Compact
- Sharp Aquos R2
- Sharp Aquos R2 Compact
- Sharp Aquos R3
- Sharp Aquos R5G
- Sharp Aquos R6
- Sharp Aquos R7
- Sharp Aquos R7s
- Sharp Aquos R8
- Sharp Aquos R8 pro
- Sharp Aquos R8s (Taiwan exclusive)
- Sharp Aquos R9
- Sharp Aquos R9 pro
- Sharp Aquos R10
- Sharp Aquos R11
