= Nerve (disambiguation) =

A nerve is a part of the peripheral nervous system.

Nerve or Nerves may also refer to:

== Mathematics ==
- Nerve of a covering, a construction in mathematical topology
- Nerve (category theory), a construction in category theory

== Film and television ==
- Nerves (film), a 1919 film by the Austrian director and novelist Robert Reinert
- "Nerve" (Farscape), a 2000 episode of Farscape
- Nerve (2013 film), a 2013 Australian psychological thriller film
- Nerve (2016 film), a 2016 American drama thriller film

== Books ==
- Nerves (Del Rey novella), a 1942 novella (and 1956 novel) by Lester del Rey
- Nerve (Francis novel), a 1964 novel by Dick Francis
- Nerve (Ryan novel), a 2012 young adult thriller by Jeanne Ryan

== Magazines ==
- Nerve (magazine), a Liverpool-based arts and social issues magazine
- Nerve.com, an online magazine
- The Nerve (magazine), a Canadian music magazine

== Music ==
=== Artists ===
- The Nerves, an American power pop band
- Nerve (band), an American band founded by Jojo Mayer
- Nerve, an industrial rock band that included Junkie XL as a member

=== Songs ===
- "Nerve", by 2hollis from Star, 2025
- "nerve", by Bis from Brand-new idol Society, 2011
- "Nerve", by Blindside from Blindside, 1997
- "Nerve", by Charlotte Church from Two, 2013
- "Nerve", by Don Broco from Automatic, 2015
- "Nerve", by Half Moon Run from Dark Eyes, 2012
- "Nerve", by Soilwork from Stabbing the Drama, 2005
- "Nerve", by The Story So Far from The Story So Far, 2015
- "Nerves", by Bauhaus from In the Flat Field, 1980
- "Nerves", by Maths Class, 2008
- "Nerves", by Silkworm from Firewater, 1996
- "The Nerve", by George Strait from Carrying Your Love with Me, 1997
- "The Nerve", by Kaiser Chiefs from Education, Education, Education & War, 2014

== Other uses ==
- Nerve (botany), another word for the vein of a leaf

== See also ==
- Nerv (disambiguation)
