= Nerve.com =

American online magazine

- Website type: Sex, relationships and culture
- Available in: English
- Founded: 1997
- Owner: HowAboutWe
- Creators: Rufus Griscom and Genevieve Field
- Editor: Peter Smith
- Website: www.nerve.com
- Commercial: Yes
- Current status: Defunct

Nerve, or Nerve.com, was an American online magazine dedicated to sexual topics, relationships and culture. Founded by Rufus Griscom and Genevieve Field, Nerve published articles and photography on its website and several books, in partnership with Chronicle Books, Plume, and Three Rivers Press. It also hosted blogs (one of the first sites to do so without fees), forums and a section for personal advertisements. Although they originated on Nerve, Nerve Personals eventually became part of a larger network of over 100 websites and print publications.

In 1999, Nerve was nominated for the Webby Award for "Print and Zines" while under the editorship of Jack Murnighan.

In 2005, under editor-in-chief Michael Martin, Nerve was nominated for the National Magazine Award for General Excellence Online. The other nominees were The Atlantic, BusinessWeek, Consumer Reports and Style.com. Of the nomination, AdAge said Nerve was "the only original online publication in the bunch ... The judges' write-up called Nerve 'brainy and brash' with a 'youthful spin on sexuality [and] style' ... It's not only redefined the model for profitable niche publishing, it's also one of the freshest editorial voices to come along in years." Under Martin's editorship, the site was nominated for a 2007 National Magazine Award for Best Interactive Feature, a 2007 Webby Award for Best Copy/Writing (alongside The New Yorker) and another National Magazine Award for General Excellence Online in 2008 for its spinoff publication, Babble.com.

Nerve was one of the first publications to publish photoblogs. They followed a number of young photographers daily, including Clayton James Cubitt, Naughty James, Ryan Pfluger and Cate & Camilia.

In January 2014, Nerve was acquired by HowAboutWe, which was in turn purchased by InterActiveCorp (IAC) less than six months later. After a long period without updates, the Nerve.com archives were taken offline on January 9, 2018, and the domain began redirecting to www.datehookup.com.
