= UltimateTV =

Ultimate TV may refer to:

- UltimateTV (online service), a defunct online service
- Microsoft UltimateTV, Microsoft's DVR intended to compete with TiVo
