= Superbad (disambiguation) =

Superbad is a 2007 American teen comedy film.

Superbad or Super Bad may also refer to:

== Music ==
- Super Bad (James Brown album), 1971
- Superbad (soundtrack), 2007
- Super Bad (Terminator X album), by Terminator X 1994
- Superbad, an album by Chris Jasper
- Superbad, a 2001 album by Romina Johnson
- Superbad: The Return of Boosie Bad Azz, a 2009 album by Lil Boosie

=== Songs ===
- "Super Bad" (song), by James Brown
- "Superbad" (song), by Flux Pavilion and Doctor P, 2011
- "Superbad", a song by Adrienne Bailon
- "Super Bad", a song by Idris Muhammad
- "Superbad", a 1987 song by Chris Jasper
- "Superbad (11:34)", a song by Travie McCoy on the album Lazarus
- "Superbad", a 2014 song by Jesse McCartney from In Technicolor

== Other uses ==
- Superbad, a 2001 novel by Ben Greenman
- Superbad (website), a web art installation
- Super Bad, an alternate title for the Despicable Me film franchise in a few countries
