= NERV =

NERV, Nerv or variations thereof may refer to:

- NERV, a fictional organization in the Neon Genesis Evangelion franchise
- NERV Disaster Prevention App, a Japanese emergency warning app whose branding is inspired by the fictional organization
- NERV, a limited special edition Aquos Phone SH-06D, a tie-in to the franchise
- Nueva Ecija Rice Vanguards, a Filipino professional basketball team
- National Emergency Rescue Vehicles, two vehicles provided and maintained by Cisco for natural disasters and other crises
- Neighborhood Retrieval Visualizer (NeRV), an algorithm in mathematics and computer science
- Nerv, a digital agency that created Clyde (mascot), the official mascot of the 2014 Commonwealth Games

== See also ==
- Nerf, a popular brand of toys
- Nerve, a part of the nervous system
- Nerve (disambiguation)
