= Sharp GX29 =

2006 mobile phone model

The Sharp GX29 is a tri-band GSM mobile phone designed and manufactured by Sharp Corp(Japan).

This model was released for several Vodafone markets in April 2006. Basically this is a repackaged model of its predecessor, GX25.

It has the following specifications:

- 640x480 CMOS Digital Camera
- 256K-color (240x320 dot total) (240x294 dot useful) QVGA TFT LCD
- Tri-band (GSM 900, 1800, 1900)
- Java virtual machine MIDP2.0+VSCL1.1
- Bluetooth V1.1
- IrDA
- USB Interface (uses proprietary data cable)
- WAP Openwave v6.2.3
- MMS
- GPRS class-10
- e-mail client pop3 only
- Clock
- 6 Alarm clocks
- Calendar
- Calculator
- Currency converter
- Enhanced Phonebook

Being targeted at middle tier of the product lineup, it does not have the following features:

- Stopwatch
- Countdown timer
- Voice dialing
- MP3
- Todo list
- SyncML

It weighs 92g and its size is 20.3 x 93.8 x 46 mm.

A custom-designed connector is used to both charge the phone battery and connect to the computer via USB. This same connector style is used for many of Sharp's mobile phone models. Powered by a li-ion battery, it has a stand-by time to 250 hours.

The Sharp GX29 is designed to work with its own Handset Manager software. So, it may not work correctly with some standard PC synchronization applications: for example, remote reading of the battery level is not supported.
