= MTV 500 =

Top music video countdown

The MTV 500 was a countdown of the Top 500 music videos of all time according to MTV. It was aired in the spring of 1997 and then again in November 1997, which included 12 new videos from that year, while the other videos kept their original rankings.

== History ==
MTV ran 2 versions of this countdown, the first time in the spring of 1997 and then again in November 1997. The second version kept the same rankings but included new video replacements. "Smells Like Teen Spirit" by Nirvana was named the number-one music video of all time.

== See also ==
- MTV Video Music Award
