= Vicki L. Hanson =

American computer scientist (died 2026)

Vicki Hanson
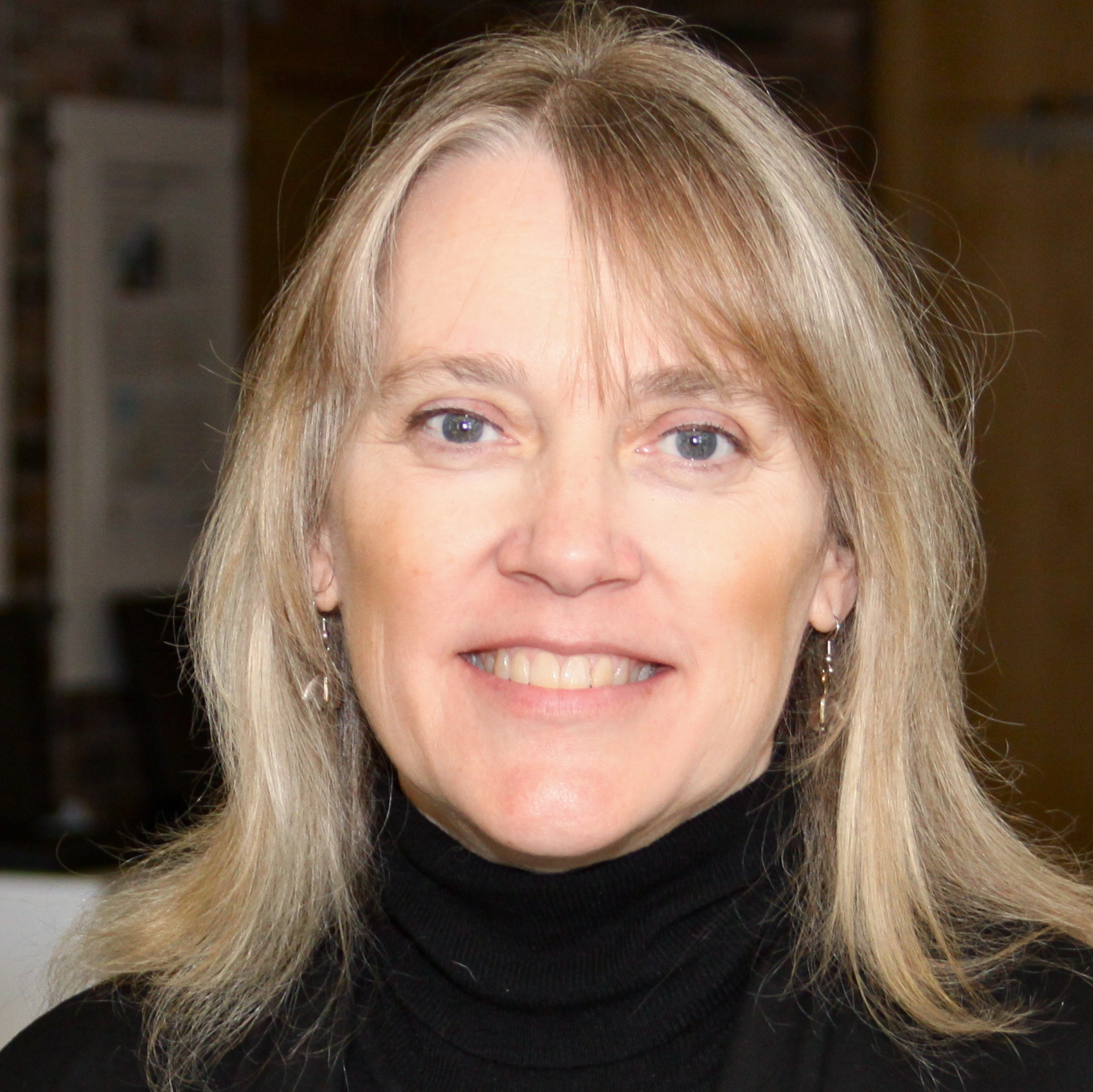
- Born: Vicki Lynne Hanson; December 17, 1951; Indianapolis, Indiana, U.S.
- Died: January 20, 2026
- Education: University of Colorado Boulder; University of Oregon
- Known for: Human-Computer Interaction; Accessibility
- Awards: National Academy of Engineering (2020); ACM SIGCHI Academy (2017); ACM SIGACCESS Award for Outstanding Contributions to Computing and Accessibility (2014); Fellow of the Royal Society of Edinburgh (2013); Anita Borg Institute, Woman of Vision Award for Social Impact (2013); Royal Society Wolfson Research Merit Award (2009); Fellow of the British Computer Society (2008); ACM SIGCHI Social Impact Award (2008); ACM Fellow (2004)
- Scientific career
- Fields: Computer Science
- Workplaces: University of Dundee; Rochester Institute of Technology
- Doctoral advisor: Michael Posner
- Website: vickihanson.org

Vicki Lynne Hanson (died January 20, 2026) was an American computer scientist noted for her research on human-computer interaction and accessibility and for her leadership in broadening participation in computing.

Hanson was named the chief executive officer of the Association for Computing Machinery (ACM) in 2018 having served as its president from 2016 to 2018.

She was elected a member of the National Academy of Engineering in 2020 for contributions to the design of accessible systems and for leadership in the computer science and engineering community.

== Education ==
In 1974 Hanson graduated with a Bachelor of Arts degree in psychology from the University of Colorado Boulder. At the University of Oregon she graduated with a Master of Arts degree in cognitive psychology in 1976, going on to complete her Ph.D. in 1978.

== Career and research ==
Hanson was a Distinguished Professor at the Rochester Institute of Technology within the HCI and Accessibility research groups. She was also Professor and Chair of Inclusive Technologies at the University of Dundee where she led multiple efforts related to inclusion of older adults and individuals with disabilities. From 1986 to 2009 she was a Research Staff Member and Manager at IBM’s T. J. Watson Research Center in New York, founding the Accessibility Research Group in 2000.

She was past chair of SIGACCESS and was founder and co-editor-in-chief of ACM Transactions on Accessible Computing. She has served on Fellows Committees for ACM and the Royal Society of Edinburgh and has been active in conference organizing and program committees for ASSETS, CHI, and several other ACM conferences. She was elected as ACM President for a two-year term in 2016.

Hanson's interest in supporting disabled populations began at the University of Colorado Boulder where she focused on communication disorders, majoring in psychology along with speech pathology and audiology. In graduate school at the University of Oregon, her scope broadened to include psycholinguistics and applied cognitive psychology. These threads converged during her postdoctoral fellowship at the Laboratory for Language and Cognitive Studies at the Salk Institute in La Jolla, California, and later at Haskins Laboratories in New Haven, Connecticut, where she conducted research on American Sign Language (ASL) and the acquisition of reading by deaf children and adults. In this work, she demonstrated the degree to which reading success among the profoundly and prelingually deaf was coupled to the existence and use of phonological mental representations, representations that were formed without the benefit of ever having heard spoken language.

Joining the Research staff at IBM's Thomas J. Watson Research Center in 1986, Hanson began developing educational applications for the deaf and others. Her first application, HandsOn demonstrated how computer technology could provide a bilingual educational experience for deaf children. Combining ASL and English, it allowed a student's skill in ASL to bootstrap the acquisition of skill in English. The technology was, for its time, state of the art, involving an object-oriented application environment, coupled to random-access laser disks, all driven by a simple touch screen user interface, and was deployed at numerous schools for deaf children in the United States and Canada. It was recognized in 1992 as a National Merit Winner in the Johns Hopkins National Search for Computing to Assist Persons with Disabilities. Recently it has been rebuilt using streaming Internet video and conventional browser technologies, allowing it to be used by a much larger audience.

In 2000 IBM formed a Worldwide Accessibility Center and Hanson took on the management of the newly formed Accessibility Research Group. A primary output of this effort was Web Accessibility Technology (for Internet Explorer) and accessibilityWorks (for Firefox), browser extensions that allowed people with visual, motor, and cognitive disabilities to modify Web content on the fly to meet their needs. Initially tested with older adults through SeniorNet and other organizations serving older adults, it was subsequently deployed in 26 countries through numerous non-profit organizations. In 2003, the National Disabilities Council named it Product of the Year. In 2004, it received the Best New Ability Research Award from the New Freedom Foundation and the Applied Research da Vinci award from the National Multiple Sclerosis Society. In 2006 it brought IBM recognition as the Goodwill Partner of the Year, and in 2008 it received Lighthouse International’s Corporate Visionary award. In 2011, accessibilityWorks was donated to the Global Inclusive Infrastructure project as a key open source component. Later work included the world's first fully accessible 3D virtual world.

In 2009 Hanson joined the School of Computing at the University of Dundee in Scotland as Professor and Chair of Accessible Technology. Working with Newcastle University, she launched the Social Inclusion Through the Digital Economy (SiDE) project aimed at ensuring that all people, regardless of age or disability, were not left behind as the world became more digitally linked. The success of this effort motivated a broadening of the work in the BESiDE project, targeting both technology and architectural design aspects of the Built Environment of older adult care homes.

In 2013, Hanson accepted an appointment at the Rochester Institute of Technology as a distinguished professor where she built a team to continue research in support of the disabled and older adults. In 2018, she was named executive director and chief executive officer of ACM.

== Death ==
Hanson died on January 20, 2026.

== Awards and honors ==
Hanson was named an ACM Fellow in 2004, a Fellow Chartered Information Technology Professional of the British Computer Society in 2008, a recipient of the Royal Society Wolfson Research Merit Award in 2009, and a Fellow of the Royal Society of Edinburgh in 2013. She received the ACM SIGCHI Social Impact Award in 2008, the Women of Vision ABIE Award for Social Impact in 2013, and the ACM SIGACCESS Award for Outstanding Contributions to Computing and Accessibility in 2014. Hanson was awarded an Honorary Doctorate from Newcastle University in 2017 as part of the 60th anniversary of computing at the University. She was elected to the ACM SIGCHI Academy in 2017 and the National Academy of Engineering in 2020.
