= Murnighan =

Murnighan is a surname. Notable people with the surname include:

- J. Keith Murnighan (1948–2016), American social scientist and writer
- Jack Murnighan (born 1969), American writer
