= Samsung SGH-X200 =

Mobile phone model

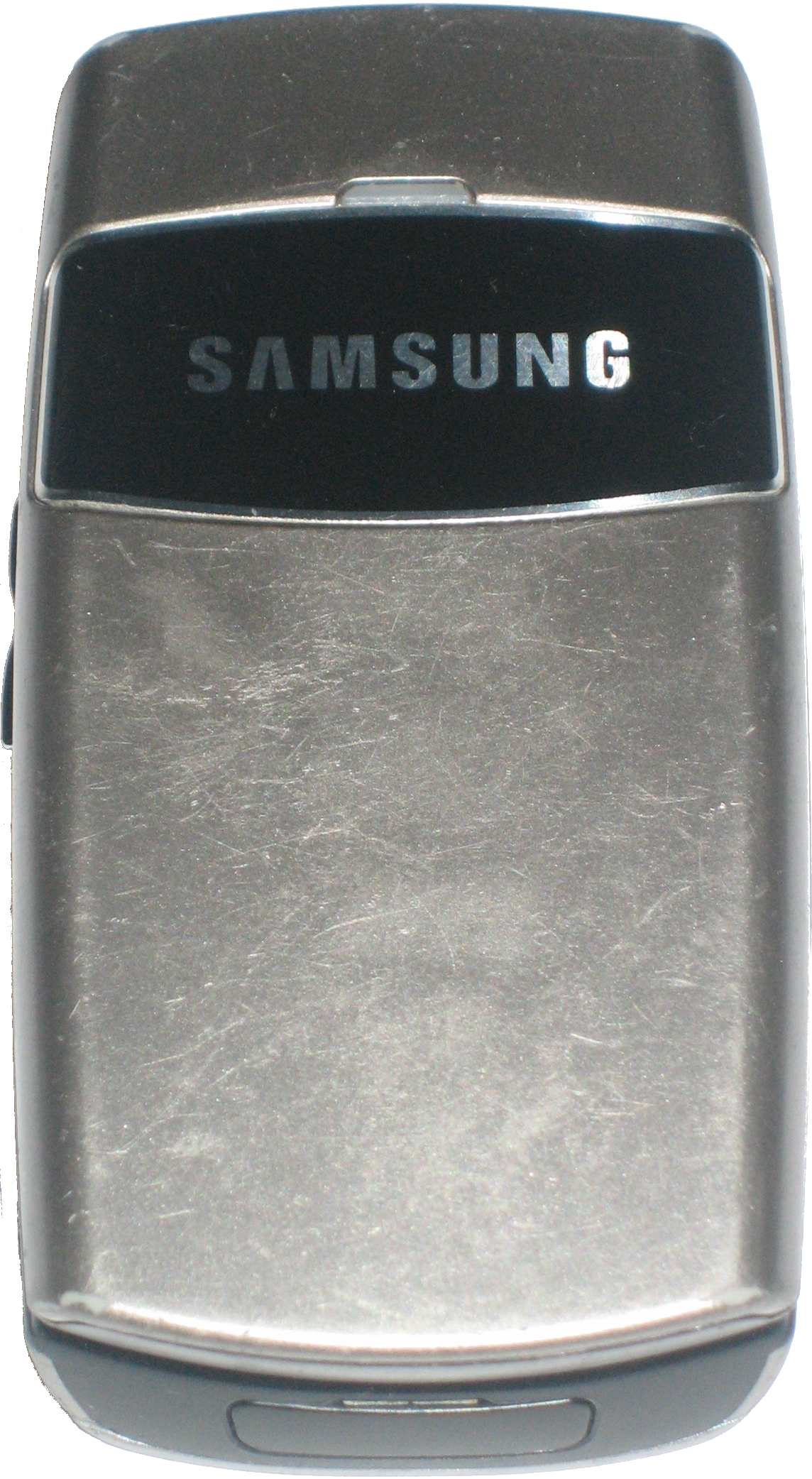
- Manufacturer: Samsung Electronics
- Compatible networks: Tri Band (GSM 900 / 1800 / 1900 MHz)
- Form factor: clamshell
- Dimensions: 85×43.5×19.8 mm (3.35×1.71×0.78 in)
- Weight: 77 g
- Battery: 800 mAh Li-ion
- External display: 128 X 160 px LCD 65k colors
- Connectivity: IrDA

The SGH-X200 is a mobile phone from Samsung. The phone focuses on being small and light rather than on advanced features like camera and music.

The phone features a 2.5 mm headset jack and an infrared port for synchronizing with a PC.

The proprietary port on the bottom of the phone is used for charging the device and can also be connected via a serial cable to a computer.
