= Sharp GX25 =

Mobile phone model

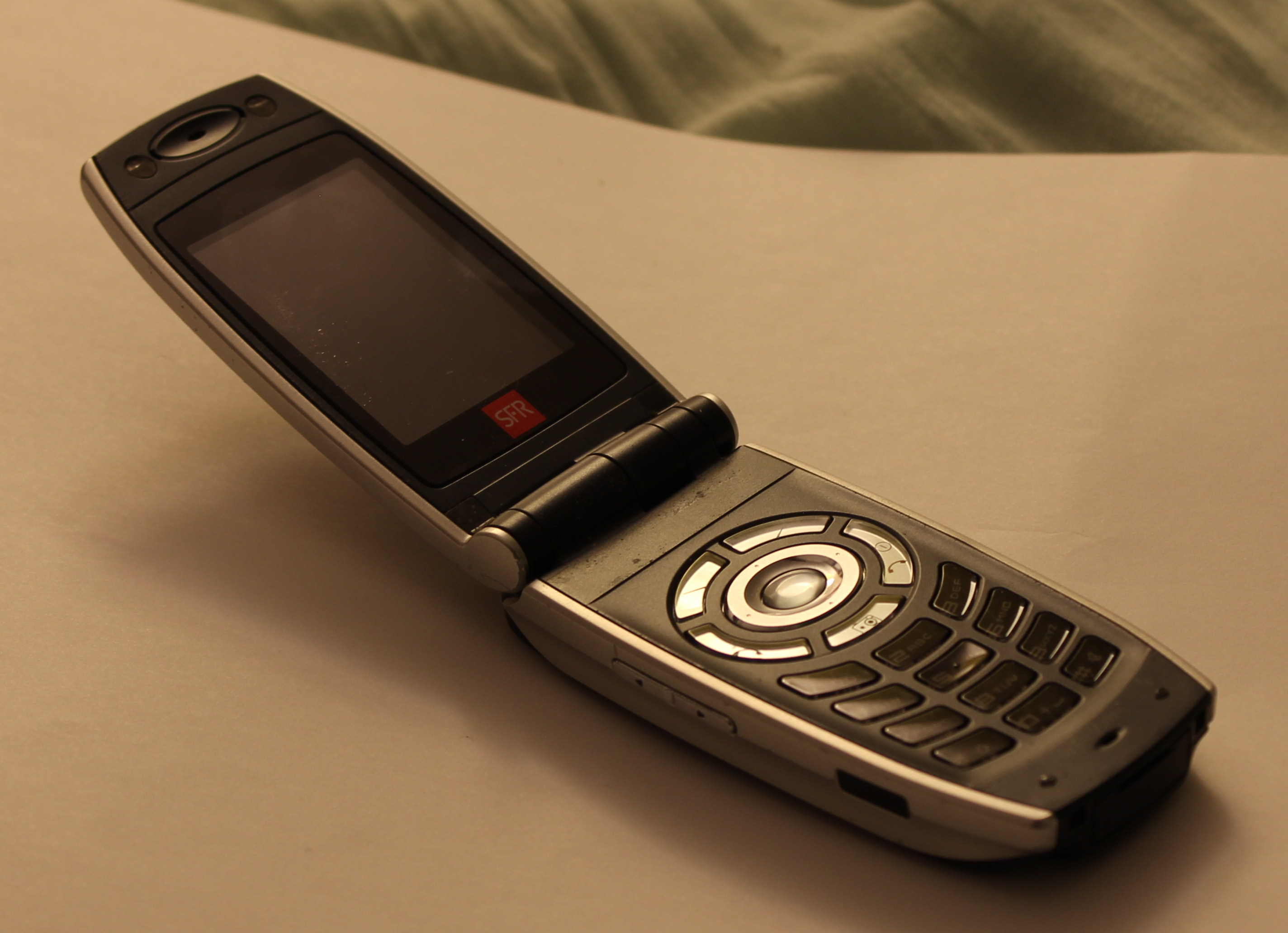
An unfolded Sharp GX25 sold by SFR.

The Sharp GX25 is a tri-band GSM mobile phone designed by Sharp Corporation.

This model was released in October 2005 from Vodafone. Sister models were sold in Taiwan and Hong Kong.

Has the following features:

- 640x480 CMOS Digital Camera
- 256K-color (240x320 dot total) (240x294 dot useful) QVGA TFT LCD
- Tri-band (GSM 900, 1800, 1900)
- Java virtual machine MIDP2.0+VSCL1.1
- Bluetooth V1.1
- IrDA
- USB Interface (uses proprietary data cable)
- WAP Openwave v6.2.3
- MMS
- GPRS class-10
- e-mail client pop3 only
- Clock
- 6 Alarm clocks
- Calendar
- Calculator
- Currency converter
- Enhanced Phonebook

Being targeted at middle tier of the product lineup, it does not have the following features:

- Stopwatch
- Countdown timer
- Voice dialing
- MP3
- Todo list
- SyncML

It weighs 90g and its size is 23.5 x 92 x 46 mm.

A custom-designed connector is used to both charge the phone battery and connect to the computer via USB. This same connector style is used for many of Sharp's mobile phone models.

The Sharp GX25 is designed to work with its own Handset Manager software. So, it may not work correctly with some standard PC synchronization applications: for example, remote reading of the battery level is not supported.
