= Sharp GX33 =

Mobile phone model

The Sharp GX33 is a tri-band GSM mobile phone designed by Sharp Corporation (Japan).

This model was released for several Vodafone markets on Sep 2007.

== Features ==
- 640x480 CMOS Digital Camera
- 256K-color (176x220 dot total) (176x194 dot useful) QCIF+ TFT LCD
- Tri-band (GSM 900, 1800, 1900)
- Java virtual machine MIDP2.0+VSCL1.1
- Bluetooth V1.1
- USB Interface (uses proprietary data cable)
- WAP Openwave v6.2.3
- MMS
- GPRS class-10
- e-mail client pop3 only
- Clock
- 6 Alarm clocks
- Calendar
- Calculator
- Currency converter
- Enhanced Phonebook

Being issued for low-end markets, the phone lacks the following features:

- Stopwatch
- Countdown timer
- Voice dialing
- MP3
- Todo list
- SyncML

A custom-designed connector is used to both charge the phone battery and connect to the computer via USB. This same connector style is used for many of Sharp's mobile phone models.

The Sharp GX33 is designed to work with its own Handset Manager software. So, it may not work correctly with some standard PC synchronization applications: for example, remote reading of the battery level is not supported.
