= Sharp GX15 =

The Sharp GX15 is a tri-band GSM mobile phone designed by Sharp Corp (Japan). It was released in 2004.

This model was almost exclusively sold by Vodafone in both Europe and Australasia. Sister model GZ100 was sold by Hong Kong's SmarTone.

Has the following features:

- 640x480 CMOS Digital Camera
- 65K-color (120x160 dot total) (120x147 dot useful) QQVGA TFT LCD
- Tri-band (GSM 900, 1800, 1900)
- 1.8MiB Flash memory
- Java virtual machine MIDP2.0+VSCL1.1
- Bluetooth V1.1
- IrDA
- USB Interface (uses proprietary data cable)
- WAP Openwave v6.2.3
- MMS
- GPRS class-10
- Clock
- 6 Alarm clocks
- Calendar
- Calculator
- Currency converter
- Enhanced Phonebook

Being targeted at the lower-specification end of the product spectrum, it does not have the following features:

- Stopwatch
- Countdown timer
- Voice dialing
- MP3
- Todo list
- SyncML

It weighs 84g and its size is 17.8 x 105 x 45 mm.

A custom-designed connector is used to both charge the phone battery and connect to the computer via USB. This same connector style is used for many of Sharp's mobile phone models.

The Sharp GX15 is designed to work with its own Handset Manager software. So, it may not work correctly with some standard PC synchronization applications: for example, remote reading of the battery level is not supported.
