= Zap2it =

Website providing TV listings in US and Canada

- Website type: Television listings; Entertainment news (2000–2017); Film showtimes (2000–2017)
- Available in: English
- Dissolved: March 25, 2025; 19 months ago
- Owners: Tribune Media Services (2000–2019); Nexstar Media Group (2019–2025)
- Website: tvschedule.zap2it.com
- Commercial: Yes
- Registration: Optional
- Launched: April 3, 2000; 26 years ago
- Current status: Defunct

Zap2it was a website and digital media company that provided television program listings information for areas of the United States and Canada. Founded in 2000 by Tribune Media Services, the site has been owned by Nexstar Media Group since 2019. Zap2it also syndicated its listings data to a number of broadcasting and multimedia companies (such as Disney and Sinclair Broadcast Group), pay television providers (such as Wave Broadband, Cox and Dish Network) and publications (such as The New York Times, the Los Angeles Times, and The Washington Post) for use online and in interactive programming guides.

Tribune Media began shutting down the editorial content on the website in 2017, and by 2020, only the TV listings section remained. Around March 25, 2025, Zap2it was taken offline permanently.

== History ==
Tribune Media Services first began to offer online listings services as a content provider to the online services Prodigy in the late 1980s and America Online in the early 1990s. TMS launched its first branded online television listings service, TV Quest, in 1993 on the AppleLink online service. TV Quest later migrated to Apple's eWorld services in the mid-1990s and to the internet in 1999.

In early 2000, Zap2it was introduced as an expansion of TMS's services. The website began operating in May 2000. Zap2it emerged from a merger between TV Quest and its sister site, UltimateTV.

UltimateTV offered viewers and industry insiders breaking news, Nielsen ratings, live celebrity chats and more. The site provided video clips, interviews and promos in its Promo Lounge area.

The earliest Zap2it focused on films, television and original web-based content. The site offered original editorials along with listings information for films, television and online. It also listed online content such as short films, interactive games and webisodes offered by Atom Films, Shockwave.com and iFilm.

Zap2it's television listings and film showtimes were generated by TMS data, with web listings by Yack data.

The site's editorial pages, including the front page, were redesigned in 2001. In early 2003, the editorial focus of Zap2it was narrowed to television and film, and the site was again redesigned. An agreement with Fandango in 2005 allowed for the introduction of online movie ticketing for select theaters. Blogs, including It Happened Last Night, which offered show recaps, were first launched in 2006 and expanded thereafter. In 2007, the site launched "click-to-record" functionality allowing users with TiVo digital video recorders to remotely schedule recordings directly from within the Zap2it television listings. TVOvermind (est. 2008) was a blog dedicated to episodic recaps. It was purchased by BC Media Group in 2012.

On October 3, 2016, the site was rebranded as Screener.

In April 2017, Tribune Media announced the end of editorial content on Screener. By January 2018, only the TV listings and TV by the Numbers sections remained, and the website reverted to the name Zap2it. TV by the Numbers ceased operations at the end of January 2020.

In March 2025, Zap2it's owner Nexstar Media Group abruptly took the website offline. The domain name for Zap2it began redirecting to the schedule page for NewsNation, a cable television network owned by Nexstar. However, the same TV schedule grids that had been on Zap2it could still be found under Gracenote's domain name via users' Zap2it logins.

== Product development ==
In early 2007, Zap2it released enhanced television listings on its main site. Upgrades to the product included improved performance, better customization capabilities and the introduction of sharing tools and a user rating system. Following a testing period, the television-listings product was made available to affiliates.

In 2008, a revised movie-showtimes product was developed on the main site. It more prominently showcased movie trailers and offered expanded cast and crew lists which linked to celebrity profile pages.

== Editorial development ==
In February 2009, Zap2it began to play an expanded role within the Tribune Company. The site became the central aggregator of entertainment content produced by Tribune-owned online properties including latimes.com, The Envelope, chicagotribune.com and others. As part of this development, a major site redesign was planned for midyear 2009.

== See also ==
- List of assets owned by Tribune Company
- Lists of websites
