= Sharp SH906i =

Mobile phone

FOMA SHARP SH906i
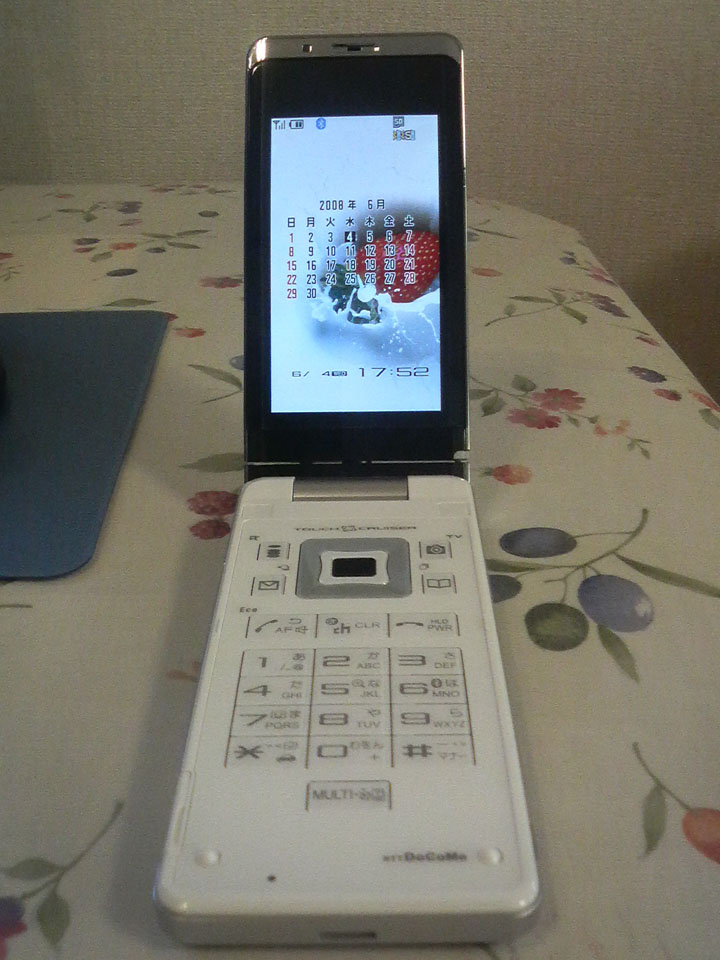
- Manufacturer: Sharp Corporation
- Availability by region: June 2008
- Predecessor: FOMA SH905i
- Successor: FOMA SH-03A, FOMA SH-01A
- Compatible networks: -3G：800MHz,850MHz,1.7GHz, 2GHz -2G：900MHz,1800Mhz,1900MHz
- Form factor: Flip
- Dimensions: 112×49×18.6 mm (4.41×1.93×0.73 in)
- Weight: 135 gr
- Operating system: Symbian OS + MOAP(S)
- Memory: unknown MB internal
- Removable storage: up to 4GB microSD
- Battery: 800 mAh Li-Pol battery
- Rear camera: 5.2 megapixel, 5.0MP Effective
- Display: 3.0" TFT LCD, 16M Colors; 854X480 pixels
- Media: -M4A/WMA player
- Connectivity: -Bluetooth (2.0 + ADP) -USB (2.0 proprietary FOMA standard) -Infrared

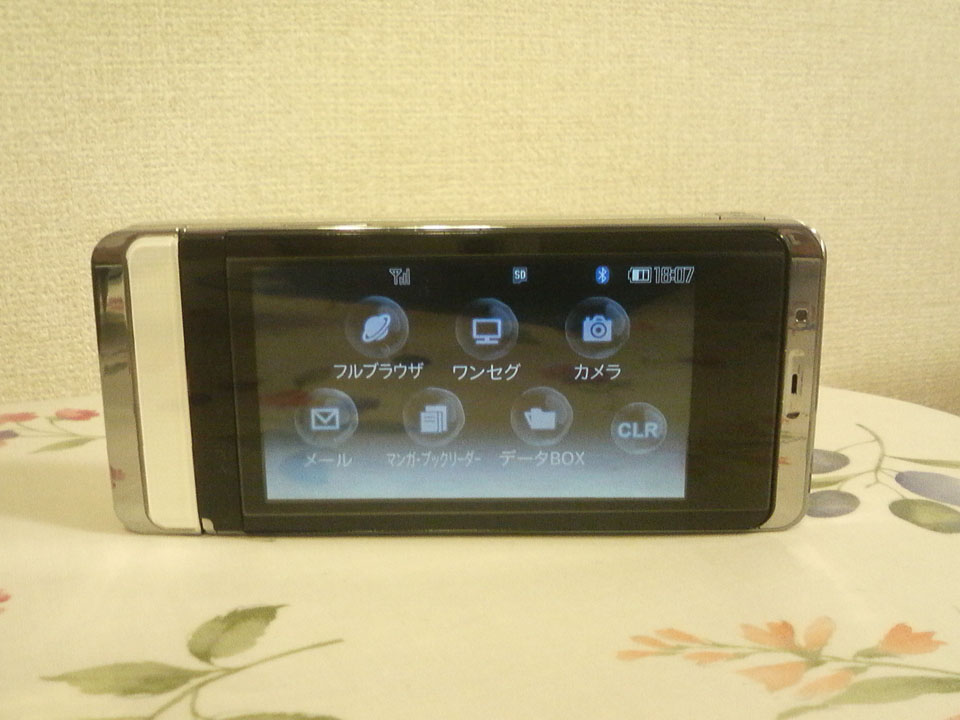
Landscape view of the SH906i

FOMA SH906i is a mobile phone developed by Sharp for NTT DoCoMo using the FOMA（HSDPA） 3G network.

== Features ==
The SH906i is only available in the Japanese market. It is the first ClearPad enabled touchscreen mobile phone to be introduced to Japan's mobile handset market. Similar to the SH905i, it has a screen that can flip 180 degrees to face opposite from the user. The overall look of the phone closely resembles that of a SH903i.

The screen is a 3.0" TFT LCD unit capable of representing 16.7 million colors at 854X480 resolution. It also sports a strengthened form of anti-peek technology whereby a press of a button activates patterns across the screen when viewed at an angle.

The lid can be folded down while the screen is flipped outwards, enabling the touch screen feature of this phone. The screen itself users capacitive screen, hence it is not possible to use a stylus. Users in Japan can use the phone in this mode to browse the web, watch 1SEG terrestrial TV, and control the camera.

The directional key now contains a sensor integrating Sharp's exclusive "Touch Cruiser" technology. This allows users to navigate the menus akin to using a laptop touch pad. The settings allow for multiple sensitivity options as well as an option to turn it off altogether.

The camera has been upgraded to a 5.2MP CMOS unit with AutoFocus for up to 5 faces. It features anti-shake technology, automatic white balance and a panoramic mode. However, the handset does not feature a secondary camera. For 3G calls, it is still possible to use the primary camera by swiveling the lid 180 degrees.

Bluetooth is built in, a first for FOMA Sharp handsets. However it is limited to headset pairing only.

=== Preinstalled i-アプリ (i-Appli) ===
- Japanese-English translator for SH
- Japanese-Chinese translator for SH
- Web Dictionary
- GPS
- TV Remote
- DCMX Mobile Wallet Service
- FeliCa
- Devil May Cry for SH
- Google Mobile Maps
- Manga/Book Reader

== See also ==
- List of Sharp mobile phones
- NTT docomo - dominant carrier
