= And/Or Gallery =

Art gallery in Pasadena, California, US

And/Or Gallery is a contemporary art gallery currently operating in Pasadena, California. Founded in 2006 by Paul Slocum and Lauren Gray in Dallas, the gallery has a particular focus on technology-based artwork. The gallery has exhibited artists including Petra Cortright, Paper Rad, JODI, Cory Arcangel, Olia Lialina, Guthrie Lonergan, and Kyoobur9000.
