= Built-in hold =

Part of a rocket launch countdown

A built-in hold is a period in a launch countdown during which no activities are scheduled and the countdown clock is stopped. The hold serves as a milestone in the countdown, an opportunity for non-launch activities (such as a shift change or meal break), and a chance to perform unanticipated activities such as equipment repair.

Most importantly, a hold provides an opportunity to synchronize the pre-launch activity schedule (concluding at T−0) with the desired wall-clock time of launch (L−0). Activities might take more or less time than planned, or the launch time might be moved, e.g. due to weather.

A planned hold may be of a fixed or variable duration. Criteria for exiting the hold and restarting the countdown may be based on a fixed time, the completion of a checklist of work items, or a go/no-go decision from mission management.

For example, space shuttle launch countdowns begin at T−43 hours and include seven holds at T−27 hours, T−19 hours, T−11 hours, T−6 hours, T−3 hours, T−20 minutes, and T−9 minutes. These holds total about 26 hours, so the launch countdown begins at about L−69 hours.
