= Sharp SX862 =

2008 mobile phone model

- Manufacturer: Sharp
- Availability by region: 2008
- Compatible networks: HSPA 3.6 Mbit/s / WCDMA 2100MHz / GSM Triband 900/1800/1900MHz
- Form factor: clamshell
- Dimensions: 110.6 by 50 by 18 millimetres (4.35 in × 1.97 in × 0.71 in)
- Weight: 120 g (4.2 oz)
- Memory: 50 MB
- Removable storage: Supports up to 2 GB MicroSD Memory Card
- Battery: Li-Ion
- Rear camera: 3.2 megapixels/ Auto focus/ 25x digital zoom
- Display: 3.2" 854 x 480 pixels 16:9 widescreen
- Connectivity: Stereo Bluetooth, USB, Infrared

The Sharp SX862 was a mobile phone designed by the Sharp Corporation. It featured a 3.2 inch, 16:9 widescreen VGA resolution display that offered a 2000:1 contrast ratio. It had a T-shaped swivel form.

== History ==
The Sharp SX862 was an international version of the Sharp 920SH, which was originally released in Japan in late 2007.

== Features ==
=== Screen ===
The Sharp SX862 featured a swiveling 3.2 inch AQUOS liquid crystal widescreen (854 x 480 pixels) display. The display used Sharp CG Silicon technology, which allowed for consistent picture quality. Sharp’s proprietary Mobile Advance Super View technology enabled a 160 degree viewing angle by minimizing glare and reflections.

=== Media player ===
The Sharp SX862 offered high quality video playback and media player capabilities. Users had a variety of means to transfer content into the SX862, which also acted as a music player and offered playback for what was at the time a wide variety of digital audio formats.

=== Internet ===
The Sharp SX862 supported high-speed HSPA 3.6Mbit/s Internet connectivity and web browsing. Users could view up to three pages at once in separate tabs, and the interface had a smooth-action cursor which allowed users to jump between hyperlinks. The display could also be magnified.

=== Camera / Camcorder ===
The Sharp SX862 featured a 3.15 megapixel camera with autofocus, automatic exposure control, and a high intensity LED light which enabled close-up photography in low-light conditions. It also offered VGA quality video recording and playback.

== Specification sheet ==
Feature	Specification
Dimension	110.6 x 50 x 18mm
Weight	120g
Talk Time	up to 200 mins
Standby Time	up to 350 hours
Video Calling Time	up to 110 mins
Available Colours	Blue / Silver
Main Display Size	3.2 inch
Outer Display Size	0.5 inch
Main Display Colour	262K
Outer Display Colour	B & W
Main Display Resolution	854 x 480 pixels
Outer Display Resolution	60 x 32 pixels
Networks	HSDPA 3.6Mbit/s / WCDMA 2100 MHz / GSM Triband 900/1800/1900 MHz
Internal Memory	50MB
External Memory	microSD (max up to 2GB)
Colors	Black, Silver
Battery Type	Removable Li-ion battery

== Accessories ==
- Battery
- Charger
- Stereo Headset
- CD-ROM
- Data cable
- Headset Kit
- 2 GB MicroSD memory card
- User Guide (Eng / Chi)

== See also ==
- List of Sharp mobile phones
