= Jodi (art collective) =

Internet artist collective (1994–)

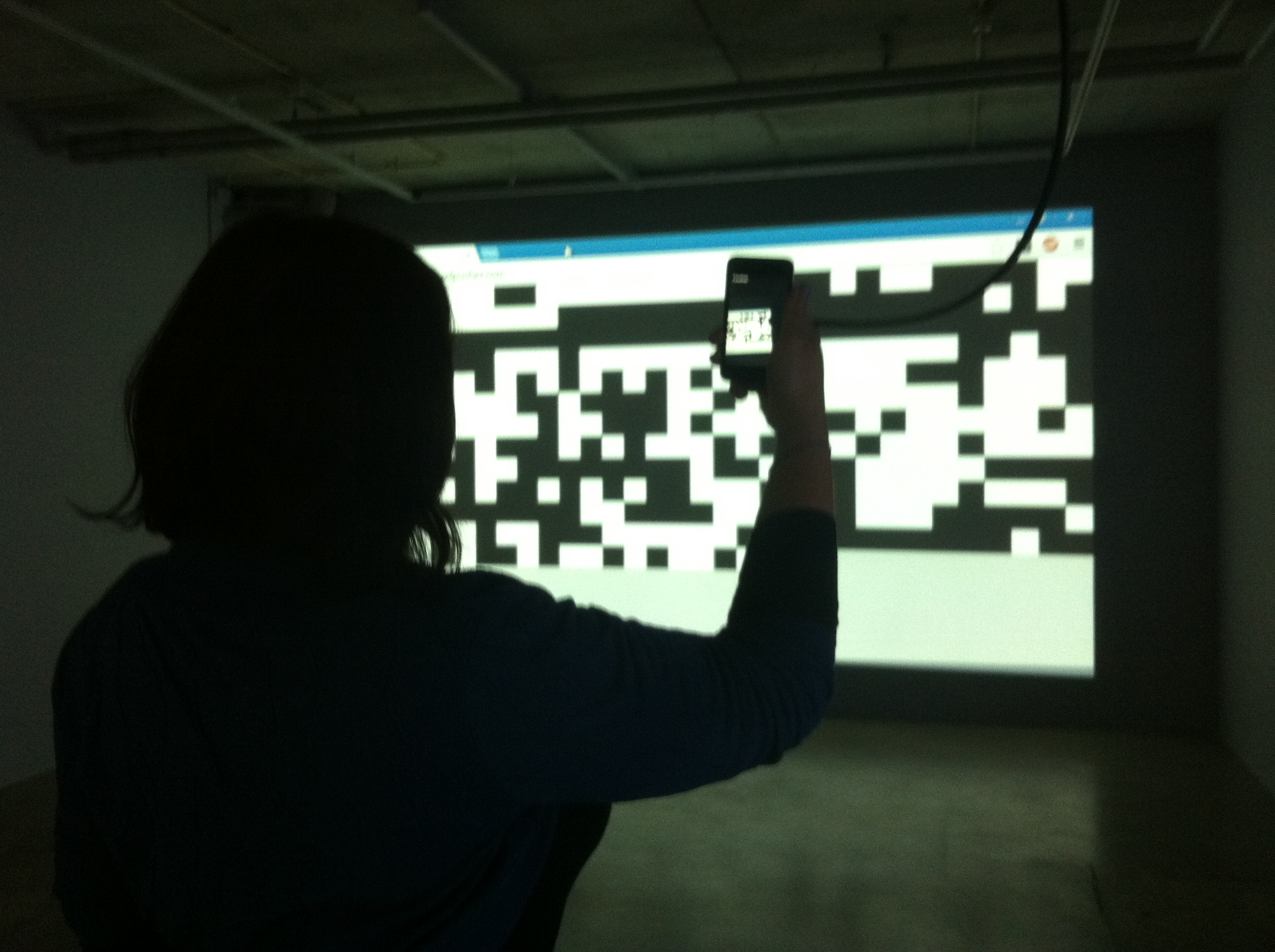
JODI 1pixelpusher at Showroom MAMA

Jodi is a collective of two internet artists, Joan Heemskerk (born 1968 in Kaatsheuvel, the Netherlands) and Dirk Paesmans (born 1965 in Brussels, Belgium), created in 1994. They were among the first artists to create Web art and later started to create software art and artistic computer game modification. Their most well-known art piece is their website wwwwwwwww.jodi.org, which is a landscape of intricate designs made in basic HTML. JODI is represented by Upstream Gallery, Amsterdam.

== The artists ==
Joan Heemskerk was born in 1968 in Kaatsheuvel, the Netherlands, and Dirk Paesmans was born in 1965 in Brussels, Belgium. They both have a background in photography and video art and studied at the CADRE Laboratory for New Media at San Jose State University in California. Paesmans also studied at Kunstakademie Düsseldorf with the founder of video art Nam June Paik.

Both Heemskerk and Paesmans live and work out of the Netherlands.

== Artworks ==
In 1999 they began the practice of modifying old video games such as Wolfenstein 3D to create art mods like SOD. Their efforts were celebrated in the 1999 Webby Awards, where they took top prize in the category of "net art." Jodi used their 5-word acceptance speech (a Webby Award tradition) to criticize the event with the words "Ugly commercial sons of bitches." Further video game modifications soon followed for Quake, Jet Set Willy, and the latest, Max Payne 2 (2006), to create a new set of art games. Jodi's approach to game modification is comparable in many ways to deconstructivism in architecture because they would disassemble the game to its basic parts, and reassemble it in ways that do not make intuitive sense. In one of their more well-known modifications of Quake places, the player inside a closed cube with swirling black-and-white patterns on each side. The pattern is the result of a glitch in the game engine discovered by the artists, presumably, through trial and error; it is generated live as the Quake engine tries, and fails, to visualize the interior of a cube with black-and-white checkered wallpaper.

=== "Screen Grab" Period (2002- ) ===
Since 2002, Jodi have been in what has been called their "Screen Grab" period, making video works by recording a computer monitor's output while working, playing video games, or coding. The "Screen Grab" period began with the four-screen video installation My%Desktop (2002), which premiered at the Plugin Media Lab in Basel. The piece appeared to depict large, malfunctioning Mac OS 9 monitors that displayed cascading windows, error messages, and files endlessly replicating themselves. To make this video, Jodi pointed-and-clicked and dragged-and-dropped frantically to give an appearance of uncontrolled chaos.

Their exhibition Jodi: goodmorning goodnight was on display at the Whitney Museum from 2013 to 2015. Another project, OXO (2018), premiered at the Lightbox Gallery at Harvard University and, later that year, would also form Jodi's contribution to the group exhibition Difference Engine at the Lisson Gallery in New York City, New York. The piece is an interactive multichannel installation based on old computer games and tic-tac-toe.

Alongside Difference Engine, Jodi also held their first solo exhibition in the Los Angeles area— a self-titled exhibition at the And/Or Gallery in Pasadena, California which involved, in part, recreating the gallery's coffered ceiling on the floor to be navigated by visitors.

A 2012 Vice magazine article said JODI's work "underlines the innate anarchy of the online medium, an arena that we've come to recognize as public but one that the duo constantly undermines and tweaks to their own purposes."

As of October 2019, My%Desktop is part of the permanent collection presentation of the new MoMA (Museum of Modern Art) in New York. The work is presented as a monumental installation of four adjacent projections, showing screen grabs of JODI's desktop-performance.

== Collections ==
The work of JODI is represented in the permanent collection of the Museum of Modern Art, ZKM Center for Art and Media Karlsruhe, among other venues.

== Selected Publications ==
- Install.exe, Christophe Merian Verlag, 2002
- Runtime.models, Dirk Paesmans, RRose Editions, 2025

== See also ==
- net.art
- Superbad.com
- New media art

== Sources ==
- Baumgärtel, Tilman (1999). net.art - Materialien zur Netzkunst (in German) (2nd ed.). Nürnberg: Verlag für Moderne Kunst Nürnberg. pp. 106–113. ISBN 3-933096-17-0.
- Baumgärtel, Tilman (2001). net.art 2.0 - New Materials towards Net art. Nürnberg: Verlag für Moderne Kunst Nürnberg. pp. 106–181. ISBN 3-933096-66-9.
- Baumgärtel, Tilman (2002). install.exe/Jodi (in German and English). Basel: Christoph Merian Verlag. ISBN 3856161848.
- Bosma, Josephine (2011). Nettitudes: Let's Talk Net Art. Rotterdam: NAi/INC. pp. 71–73. ISBN 978-90-5662-800-0.
- Conner, Michael. (2013). Required Reading: A Closer Look at JODI's 'Untitled Game'. Rhizome Journal. http://rhizome.org/editorial/2013/oct/16/required-reading-closer-look-jodis-untitled-game/
- Galloway, Alexander. (2016) Jodi's Infrastructure. E-flux Journal #74. http://www.e-flux.com/journal/74/59810/jodi-s-infrastructure/
- Saltiel, Natalie. (2011). From the Rhizome Artbase: %20 Wrong (2000)-JODI. Rhizome Journal. http://rhizome.org/editorial/2011/jul/5/20wrong-jodi-artbase/?ref=search_title.
