= TerraQuest =

Travel website

- Website type: Travel website
- Available in: English
- Website: www.terraquest.com
- Launched: November 1, 1995
- Current status: Inactive

TerraQuest was a former travel website created by travel companies Mountain Travel Sobek and WorldTravel Partners.

== History ==
TerraQuest was launched on November 1, 1995 by Mountain Travel-Sobek, of El Cerrito, California, and corporate travel provider WorldTravel Partners, headquartered in Atlanta, Georgia. Expedition's included Antarctica and Ecuador.

Virtual Antarctica allowed the computer to follow a 10-day Antarctic cruise aboard the Livonia. From December 10, 1995 to December 25, 1995, the site featured live chats with crew members from Antarctica, digital photos and video direct from the field, hourly weather updates and the current position.

== Traffic ==
Since May 20, 1996, TerraQuest was getting 50,000 hits a day. Overall, TerraQuest had nearly 800,000 hits to the site and was regarded by New Media magazine as one of the most popular travel destinations on the World Wide Web.

== Reception ==
Santa Cruz Sentinel called TerraQuest one of the best educational sites on the Internet. Sarasota Herald-Tribune found TerraQuest to be more fun than thumbing through a musty encyclopedia.

== Awards ==
TerraQuest won New Media magazine’s top “Best of Online” 1996 Invision award.
