= My Yahoo =

Personalized start page and web portal

My Yahoo!

- Screenshot of My Yahoo! on June 22, 2020.
- Developer: Yahoo
- Release: July 15, 1996; 30 years ago
- Platform: Web browsers
- Type: Web Gadgets
- Website: my.yahoo.com

My Yahoo! was a start page or web portal that combined personalized Yahoo! features, content feeds, and information. The site was launched in 1996 and was one of the company's most popular creations. It was discontinued in December 2024 amid words of protest among users.

== Applications of My Yahoo ==
My Yahoo’s purpose was to have users personalize their pages.

The appearance, layout, and content of the main Yahoo homepage was standard, but My Yahoo offered customization. On it, users could apply themes, add sites, add widgets, rearrange the layout, and add tabs to the page.

A My Yahoo page allowed access to almost everything needed on one page. For example, applications and programs that allowed access to social networking, Lottery numbers, a mail aggregator, a news aggregator, gaming applications, etc... The goal was to give people access to everything they were interested in on a single page.

Users were able to link to Yahoo! Answers.

Provided the option to link Yahoo Local. Enabled local search capabilities.

In 2011, they created a mobile app.

In 2024, Yahoo! announced that My Yahoo! will be shut down and will be replaced with a new service without RSS feeds. The shutdown appears to have taken effect as of December 11, 2024.

=== RSS features ===
- 52% of My Yahoo users are aware of RSS tools and 39% use RSS tools.
- Many websites had an “Add to My Yahoo” button to make adding an RSS feed to My Yahoo simpler.

== Criticism ==
My Yahoo couldn't consolidate different feeds resulting in the need for multiple streams.

Since the September 2013 redesign, users had complained of numerous issues:

1. Font size was too large and couldn't be changed
2. Applications were less configurable
3. Weather app used auto-locate instead of remembering a specified place
4. Column resizing was no longer allowed
5. Forced inclusion of a large Yahoo search bar

On 24 August 2017, many users reported that all RSS feeds stopped working.

== See also ==
- iGoogle
- My Excite
- My Lycos
- MSN
