= Imagine Radio =

Imagine Radio was an early Internet radio service that operated from 1998 to 1999. The website was founded by Rotem Perelmuter and P. Michael Briseno, launched by publisher Imagine Media in March 1998, and spun off as a new company that July. Users could listen to 20 pre-programmed stations or create their own custom stations by selecting artists and ranking them on a scale of zero to five. Due to legal restrictions, users could not play specific songs, but their custom stations played songs by higher-rated artists more frequently. Audio was streamed in RealAudio and Windows Media Player formats.

Viacom acquired the service in February 1999, and used it to help build its MTV Interactive division. The site was closed, but its functionality was incorporated into MTV.com, VH1.com, and Radio SonicNet, another company Viacom acquired that year. The purchase and closure led to a legal dispute between the co-founders and MTV Networks.

== See also ==
- List of Internet radio stations
