= Aquos Phone SH-06D =

Smartphone model

Sharp Aquos Phone SH-06D
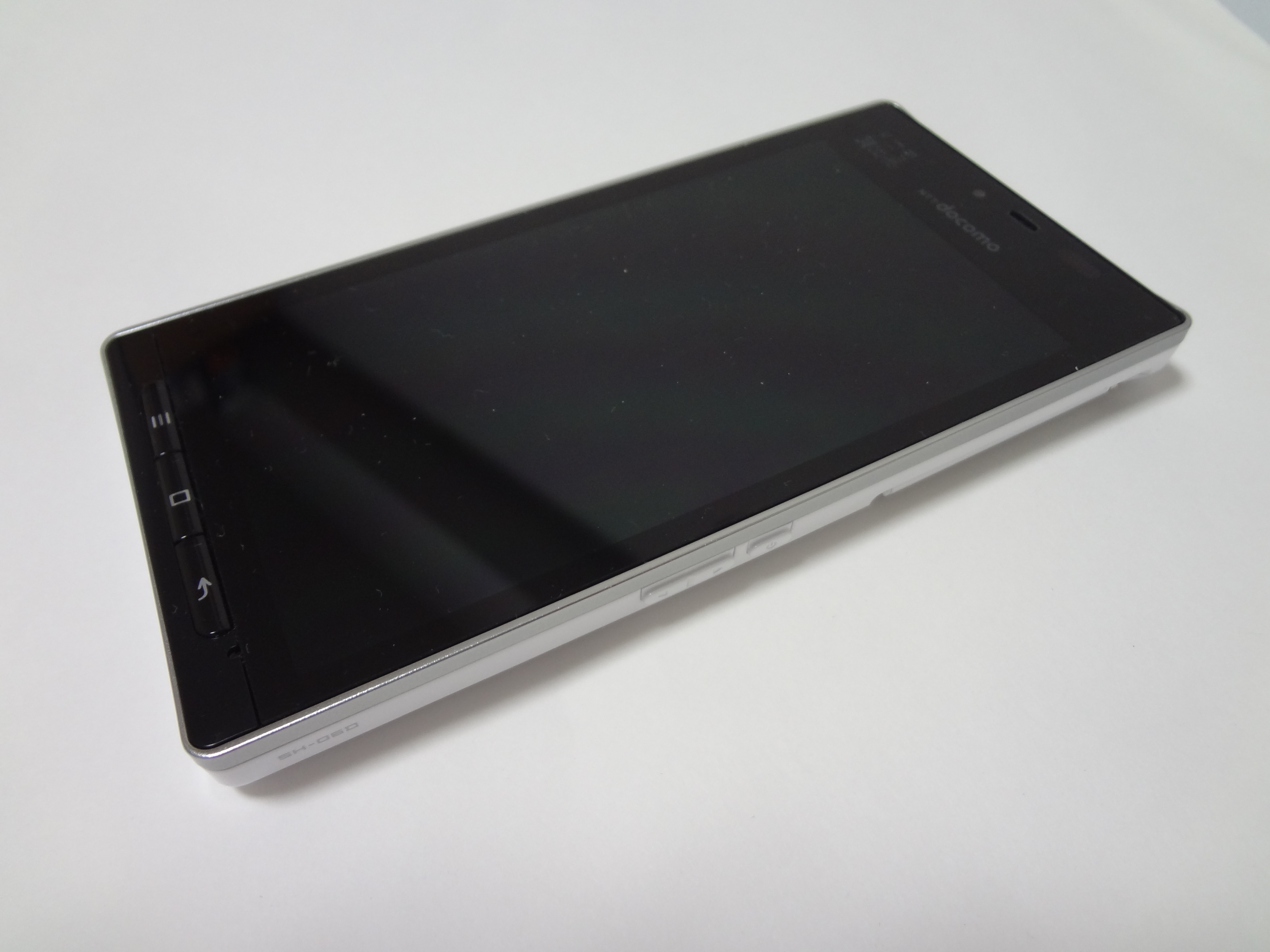
- Developer: Sharp Corporation
- Type: Smartphone
- Series: Aquos Phone
- First released: March 23, 2012; 14 years ago
- Form factor: Slate
- Operating system: Android 2.3 "Gingerbread"
- System-on-chip: Texas Instruments OMAP 4460
- CPU: 1.2 GHz dual-core ARM Cortex-A9
- Memory: 1 GB
- Storage: 8 GB
- Removable storage: Up to 32 GB microSDHC
- Battery: rechargeable Li-ion
- Rear camera: 8 MP
- Front camera: 3.2 MP
- Display: 4.5 in (110 mm) LCD, 1280x720, autostereoscopic

The Aquos Phone SH-06D is an Android smartphone manufactured by Sharp Corporation. Exclusively released in Japan in 2012 by the local carrier NTT Docomo, the device features a dual-core processor and a 720p autostereoscopic display, and was notably the first smartphone to support a new mobile TV service that had been developed in collaboration with NTT Docomo.

In June 2012, a special edition of the SH-06D themed after the anime series Neon Genesis Evangelion was released in honour of the upcoming film, Evangelion: 3.0 You Can (Not) Redo. The special edition, of which only 10,000 were made, featured a redesigned exterior and custom user interface modeled off the MAGI computer systems portrayed in the series.

== Specifications ==
The Aquos SH-06D uses a plastic-based construction, and is waterproof. It incorporates a slide-out antenna, which can be used for mobile television over either 1seg or the subscription-based service NotTV—a joint venture between NTT Docomo and other Japanese media companies. The service utilizes wireless spectrum that was formerly used for analog terrestrial television, freed by the country's transition to digital television. The SH-06D was one of two launch devices for the service, the other being a tablet produced by NEC Casio.

The device features a 4.5 in (110 mm) 720p autostereoscopic display, a dual-core 1.2 GHz Texas Instruments OMAP system-on-chip with 1 GB of RAM, and 8 GB of internal storage that can be expanded via MicroSD. The device ships with Android 2.3 "Gingerbread" as its operating system.

== NERV edition ==
In March 2012, NTT Docomo unveiled a limited, Neon Genesis Evangelion-themed edition of the SH-06D known as the SH-06D NERV, intended as a tie-in for the then-upcoming Rebuild of Evangelion film Evangelion: 3.0 You Can (Not) Redo. While maintaining similarities to the standard model, the NERV edition features a slightly modified design with a different color scheme and a new rear cover with the logo of the NERV organization. The Android operating system was also customized, with a custom home screen and widgets designed in collaboration with Studio Khara, evoking the appearance of the MAGI computer systems from the series, which uses a futuristic look with black, orange, and green accents. It was released in Japan on June 29, 2012; only 10,000 models were manufactured.

== See also ==
- List of Sharp mobile phones
- List of Android devices
- List of 3D-enabled mobile phones
