= Nerve (British magazine) =

Liverpool-based arts and social issues magazine

Coordinates: 53°24′8.9″N 2°58′39.3″W

- Frequency: Triannual
- First issue: 2003
- Country: United Kingdom
- Based in: Liverpool
- Language: English
- Website: www.catalystmedia.org.uk

Nerve is a free magazine published by Catalyst Media (formerly Catalyst Creative Media) in Liverpool, North West England. Combining features on social issues with artist profiles, it runs to 32 pages and is published about three times a year. The magazine has a broadly anti-capitalist stance.

Catalyst was set up by local writer activist and founding editor Darren Guy in early 2003, with the stated aim of "promoting grassroots arts and culture on Merseyside." When Guy moved on in winter 2006, a co-operative editorial team of Adam Ford, Paul Hunt, Ritchie Hunter and Colin Serjent was brought together. Ritchie Hunter became the main editor of the magazine from 2008 through to 2016 when he stepped down. The magazine was then taken on by Darren Guy, Colin Serjent and Paul Hunt. Nerve is probably the longest running arts and social magazine in the north west, with its primary focus being Liverpool, and its readership reaching over 10,000 copies per issue. Nerve over the years has created a lot of controversy, seeing itself as a voice for the voiceless, it has challenged both local corporate control, local council and has faced down a number of threats from both merseyside police and a large corporation, for exposing their activities. Nerve has had a number of offshoots, including 'The Nerve centre' . 'Nerve Writers' and 'Nerve radio' and its website www.catalystmedia.org.uk is probably the most accessed alternative media website on Merseyside.
