= SeniorNet =

Non-profit computer education organization

- Type: 501(c)(3) Non-Profit Organization
- Industry: Education
- Founded: 1986
- Headquarters: Fort Myers, Florida 33907, USA
- Key people: Mary Furlong; (founder); Leslie M. Smith; (Board Chairman)
- Revenue: Unknown
- Number of employees: 6 Full-Time, 4 Part-Time
- Website: www.seniornet.org

SeniorNet is a 501(c)(3) charity organization that provides computer skills and internet education to seniors, veterans, the underprivileged, the disabled, and others with physical or economic impairments. Volunteers across the country run SeniorNet Computer Learning Centres, which follow a standardized curriculum created at SeniorNet headquarters.

SeniorNet, headquartered in Fort Myers, Florida, has roughly 6,000 members and is run by volunteers. They have roughly 30 "Learning Centres" in various places across the country. They fund their operations with membership dues, class fees, philanthropic donations, and the sponsorship of organizations and foundations.

== Background ==
The organization was founded in 1986 by Dr. Mary Furlong, with headquarters originally located in San Francisco, California. In 2005, headquarters were relocated to Santa Clara, California. SeniorNet grew out of a research project funded by the Markle Foundation to determine how computers and telecommunications could enhance the lives of older adults.

With an interest in how technology enhanced the lives of older adults, Mary Furlong sought out a funding source. She encountered much skepticism as she tried to find funding for a program supporting seniors using computers. In 1986, the New York-based Markle Foundation, led by Lloyd Morrisett, recognized the program's potential and funded a research project out of the University of San Francisco. Five learning centers were opened with twenty seniors that year. Apple Computer donated computers to the individuals and centers.

== Milestones ==
1986 – SeniorNet opens their first "Learning Centers".

1987 – Newsline, SeniorNet's quarterly newsletter, makes its debut.

1988 – The first national conference is held at the University of San Francisco. The theme is "Building a Community of Computer-Using Seniors". Sponsors include Apple Computer, Pacific Telesis, the Markle Foundation, and the Ophthalmologic Surgery Society.

1990 – SeniorNet is incorporated as a 501c(3) educational non-profit organization and establishes its first independent headquarters in San Francisco. Don Rawitch writes and debuts the "Seniornet Song".

1992 – SeniorNet goes global with a new Learning Center opened in Wellington, New Zealand. IBM becomes a major sponsor and supporter, sponsoring twelve new centers in cooperation with other companies, and later co-sponsoring seven more Learning Centers along with NYNEX.

1997 – SeniorNet launches a new program, the Solutions Forum, sponsored by Met Life, to allow seniors to collaborate on the internet to address important national and global issues. Ann Wrixton becomes SeniorNet's Executive Director.

1998 – In collaboration with Microsoft, the AARP, and Sony Lifetime Connections, SeniorNet introduces over 50,000 seniors across the U.S. to computers. SeniorNet launches "SeniorNet at Sea", a program with World Explorer Cruises to teach computers on board cruise ships.

2001 – The eBay Foundation pledges a five-year, one-million dollar grant to SeniorNet to help bridge the digital divide. SeniorNet partners with SeniorWorld Japan to develop Learning Centers in Japan.

2002 – SeniorNet embarks on a nationally televised public service announcement about their programs supported by a grant from the Skoll Foundation.

2003 – SeniorNet serves as the test site for IBM's Web Adaptation Technology to provide visual and auditory support for individuals viewing web sites. PeopleChart funds and produces an online Medical Records Center for SeniorNet. It was approved for association with the Committee on Non-Governmental Organizations of the Department of Public Information of the United Nations to disseminate information about aging and technology. SeniorNet becomes a PBS Program Club and offers the first Program Club discussion on the internet.

2004 – Kristin Fabos, a former board of directors member, becomes Executive Director of SeniorNet. A national alliance is formed with the non-partisan By the People to engage individuals in civic issues.

2005 – With funding from SeniorCorps and the UPS Foundation, SeniorNet establishes a Retired Technology Volunteers program to identify, recruit, and support older adults who use computer technology in volunteer work in their communities.

2007 – SeniorNet opens its first Spanish-language Learning Center in Corpus Christi, Texas.

2020 – SeniorNet in Whanganui, New Zealand searches for more tech-savvy volunteers to help teach seniors about mobile phones and how to manage mobile banking, social media, and online shopping amidst the COVID-19 pandemic.
