= Superbad (website) =

Internet art created by Ben Benjamin in 1997

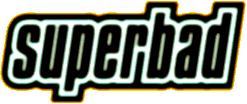
- One of Superbad's logos

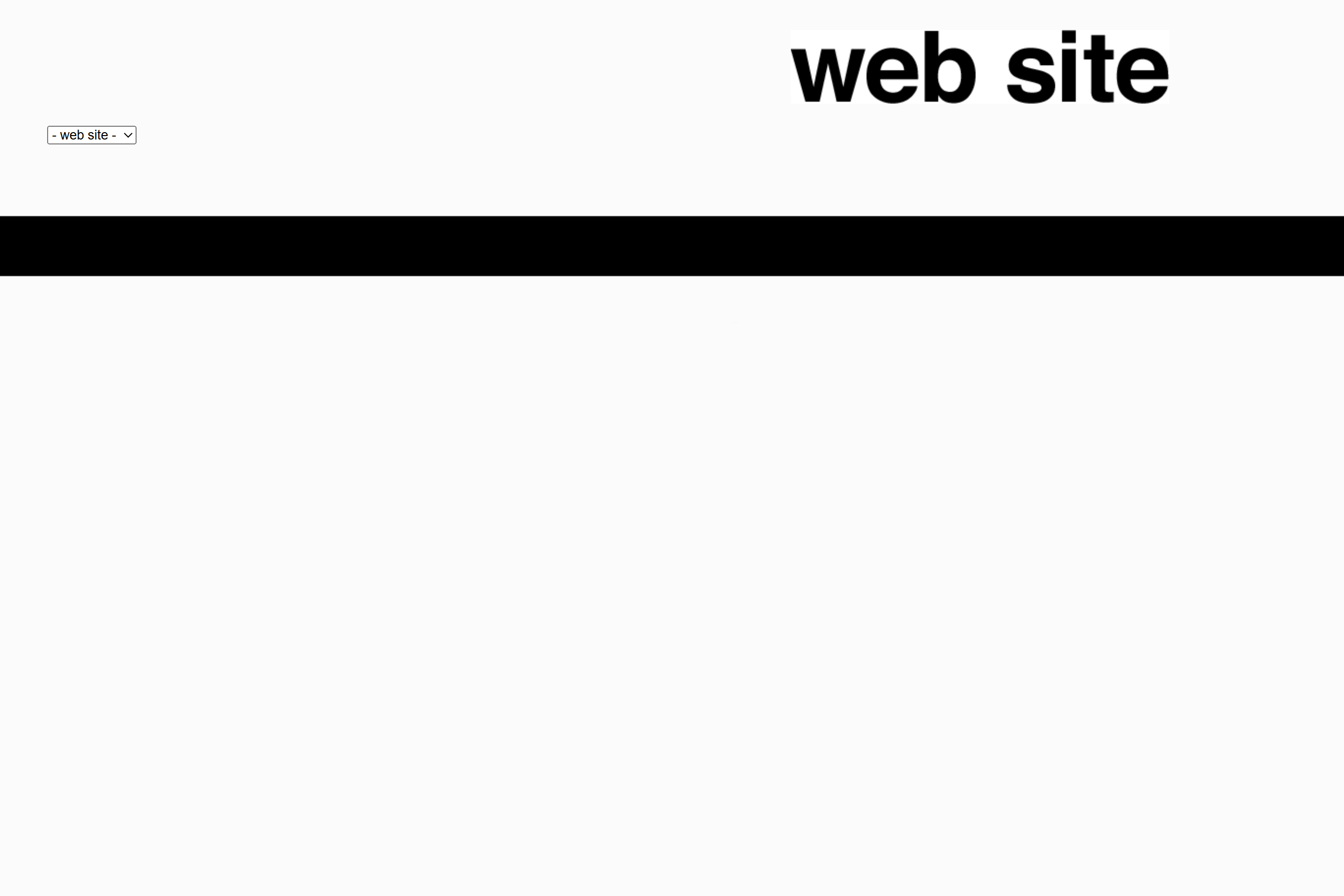
- One of Superbad's "subprojects". Clicking on the dropdown (left) reveals links to other "subprojects".
- Website type: Web art
- Available in: English (occasionally)
- Owner: Ben Benjamin
- Creator: Ben Benjamin
- Website: superbad.com
- Commercial: No
- Launched: 1997
- Current status: Active

Superbad is a noted web art installation created by graphic designer Ben Benjamin in 1997.

Superbad.com received a 1999 Webby award in the "Weird" category, and was one of nine websites featured in the Whitney Museum Biennial in 2000. Superbad began as a test bed for Benjamin's web design for technology corporations; his clients ranged from E! Online to Nippon Telegraph and Telephone. The installation uses images from Japanese pop culture.

The website serves primarily as an artistic work that was produced using the tools and methods of web design. This genre of art is often referred to as web art.

The site consists of a veritable maze of inter-linked visual, conceptual "subprojects" ranging from two-tone and technical-looking to wacky, colorful, and even bizarre. Often a subproject will have clickable elements linked to other pages within that subproject, or to another, or that just provide visual richness (e.g., the "follow" subproject has a grid of circles with arrows that follow the mouse cursor; each circle is a link to a different page within the site). Some of the pages contain narrative elements. Their main page serves as a hub to the subprojects. Clicking anywhere on the "bad" will link to somewhere within each subproject.

Time magazine cited "the very randomness of the electronic images" offered on the website that lures the viewer "deeper and deeper into its playful maze".

Benjamin sells nothing on Superbad, and received little extra traffic from the Webby award, though he did receive more junk mail when the International Academy of Digital Arts and Sciences put his name on a list. Up to 10 percent of the websites featured in the 2000 Biennal consisted of various net art projects, marking the first time they were considered "so prominently among the traditional arts", according to Salon. Benjamin "didn't really start thinking of Superbad as art until the art people started finding it", but insisted that the Whitney's selection of his and other web art projects "makes it look more valid to the art crowd. So all of a sudden because it's in a museum it's not crap anymore?"

== See also ==
- jodi.org
