= Jack Murnighan =

Jack Murnighan is the nick- and pen-name of the American John K. Murnighan Jr. (born January 18, 1969, Lafayette, Indiana, United States), an author best known for writing on literature and relationships.

== Biography ==
=== Early life ===
Jack Murnighan was raised in central Illinois, where he attended public schools, frequently representing them in statewide math competitions. Since 1998, he has lived and worked in New York City as an editor and freelance writer, and, since 2003, a professor at the University of the Arts in Philadelphia. He left his teaching position in 2009 and now divides his time between Asia and New York.

=== Career ===
In 2012 he co-authored Much Ado About Loving: What Our Favorite Novels Can Teach You About Date Expectations, Not-So-Great Gatsbys and Love in the Time of Internet Personals (2012).

In 2009 he wrote Beowulf on the Beach: What to Love and What to Skip in Literature's 50 Greatest Hits (2009), a manual for getting the most meaning and pleasure out of fifty of the most challenging (and rewarding) books in the Western canon.

From late 1998–2001, he wrote Jack’s Naughty Bits, a weekly column for nerve.com on sex and sexuality in the history of literature, which was turned into two books: The Naughty Bits (2001) and Classic Nasty (2003). In 2000 he co-edited (with Genevieve Field) the short story collection Full Frontal Fiction: The Best of Nerve.com, containing pieces by Jay McInerney, A. M. Homes, Robert Olen Butler, Mary Gaitskill, and Elizabeth Wurtzel.

He has written for Esquire and Glamour magazines and appeared repeatedly on NPR.

== Books ==
- Full Frontal Fiction: The Best of Nerve.com (Co-editor of anthology, 2000) ISBN 0609806580
- Naughty Bits: The Steamiest and Most Scandalous Scenes from the World’s Great Books (2001) ISBN 0609806602
- Classic Nasty: More Naughty Bits: A Rollicking Guide to Hot Sex in Great Books, from The Iliad to The Corrections (2003) ISBN 1568582501
- Beowulf on the Beach: What to Love and What to Skip in Literature's 50 Greatest Hits (2009) ISBN 0307409570
- Much Ado about Loving: What Our Favorite Novels Can Teach You About Date Expectations, Not So-Great Gatsbys, and Love in the Time of Internet Personals (2012) (ISBN 9781451621259)
