= UltimateTV (online service) =

UltimateTV was the name of a Web site for all-things-television officially launched in May 1998 in Encino, California. Originally a hobby website ("TV Net") started by David Cronshaw, an engineer at KCAL-TV 9, it caught the attention of Jeff Rowe, a vice president at NBC and JD Publishing, a publisher of TV schedules located in Wisconsin. Rowe, Cronshaw and JD developed a business plan, hiring James Lamb of Tacoma, Washington as their first employee to begin as soon as he completed college at Pacific Lutheran University. Shortly after this, the site was found by Matt Soffen and a few problems were reported to David Cronshaw to fix. Because David was not a programmer, Matt offered to help by using his skills as a programmer, system administrator, and general techie. He worked with the site until it became Zap2it.

Briefly the Web site was launched as "UTV: Your Ultimate Television Network" before United Television, the half-owners of the UPN network at the time, had their lawyers send out a cease & desist letter, claiming the name to be too similar to their own, even though they admitted the name was internal and only relevant to their work as a station-ownership group and that the term UTV was not used in the marketplace. UltimateTV was best known for its Ultimate TV Show list ("UTVL" - based on the script which ran the Ultimate Band List) and its work for other television networks creating official Web sites, most notably Buffy the Vampire Slayer and Dawson's Creek designed by Jon Ofstead, Art Director of Ultimate Studios (a division of UltimateTV) for The WB.

With Buffy the Vampire Slayer, James Lamb rose to prominence under the name TV James, shepherding a small online posting board community which ultimately grew to over 500 regular daily participants, including members of the show's cast and crew, most notably Joss Whedon. Many in that group of regular participants would go on to meet each other in person during one of several yearly parties (PBP or "Posting Board Parties") in Los Angeles or local regional gatherings of the show's fans. The posting board is credited with facilitating a number of connections which resulted in marriages between the show's fans, including Lamb and his wife Lori. The posting board software began as a free open-source perl script modified extensively by Lamb and Matthew Soffen of UltimateTV. The software is in use today on The Fuselage, the official Web site behind the creative team for the popular TV show Lost.

In 2000, UltimateTV and parent company JD Publishing became part of The Tribune Company (owners of TV stations and newspapers nationwide) and the name was sold to Microsoft as the website was merged into other Tribune offerings under the name "Zap2it.com" where it offered an expanded look at entertainment beyond just TV.
