= Countdown =

Decreasing count indicating the time remaining before an event

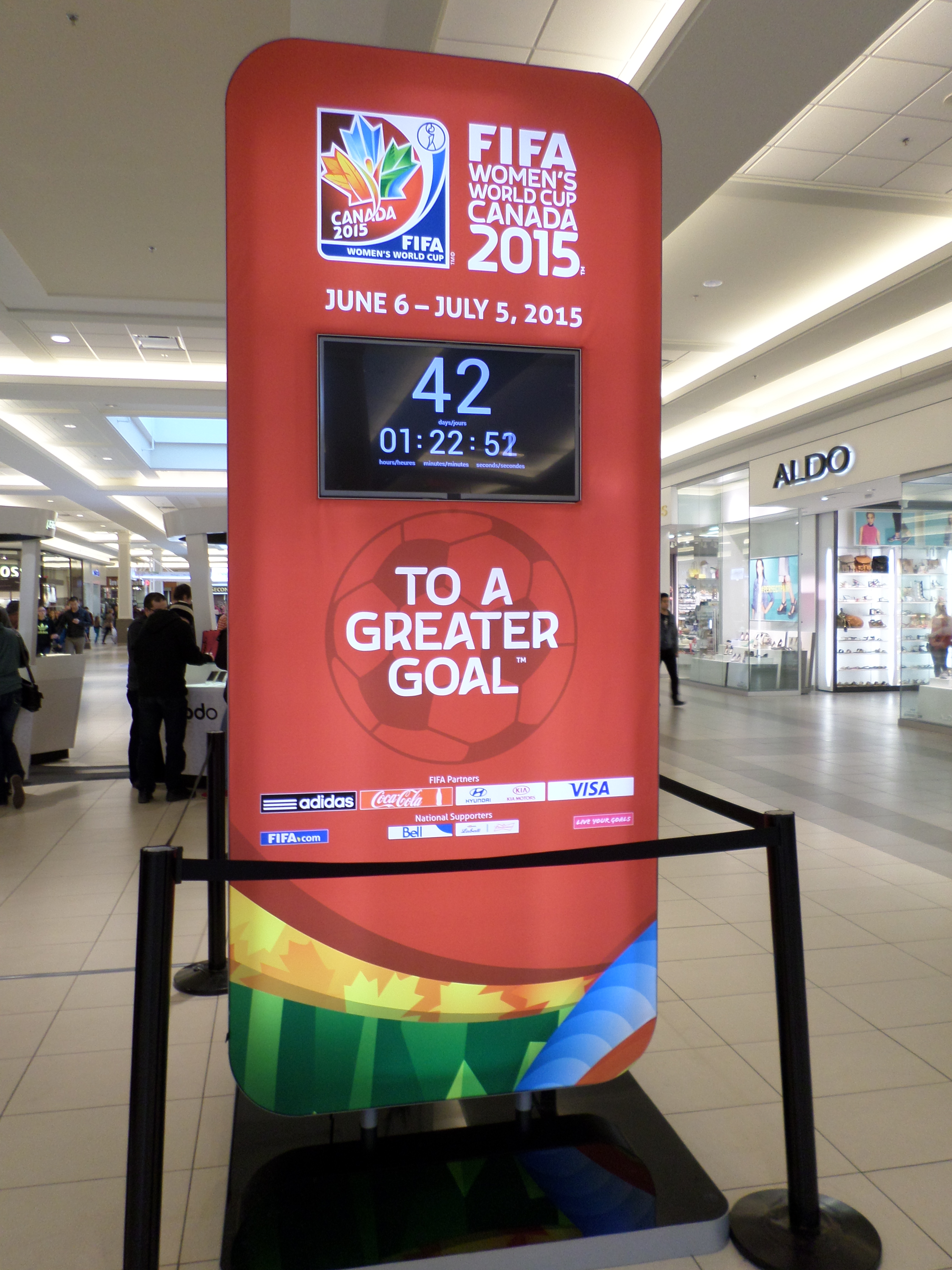
2015 FIFA Women's World Cup countdown at Champlain Place, Dieppe, New Brunswick

A countdown is a sequence of backward counting to indicate the time remaining before an event is scheduled to occur. NASA commonly employs the terms "L-minus" and "T-minus" during the preparation for and anticipation of a rocket launch, and even "E-minus" for events that involve spacecraft that are already in space, where the "T" could stand for "Test" or "Time", and the "E" stands for "Encounter", as with a comet or some other space object, like a spacecraft.

Other events for which countdowns are commonly used include the detonation of an explosive, the start of a race, the start of the New Year, or any anxiously anticipated event. An early use of a countdown once signaled the start of a Cambridge University rowing race.

One of the first known associations with rockets was in the 1929 German science fiction movie Frau im Mond (English: Woman in the Moon) written by Thea von Harbou and directed by Fritz Lang in an attempt to increase the drama of the launch sequence of the story's lunar-bound rocket:

When I count one, two, three, four, ten, fifty, one hundred, the audience doesn't know when it's going to start. But when I count backwards, ten, nine, eight, seven, six, five, four, three, two, one, ZERO! – then they understand.

— Fritz Lang

== Rocketry ==
People involved in countdowns always say that the last twenty minutes are the worst. By that time everything that needs doing has been done, and therefore everybody has twenty minutes in which to think of what may not have been done, or else what could possibly go wrong.

— Willy Ley, 1968

A countdown is a carefully devised set of procedures ending with launch of a rocket. Depending on the type of vehicle used, countdowns can start from 72 to 96 hours before launch time.

There are two countdowns proceeding simultaneously:

- The T-minus clock, a schedule of planned activities prior to launch (T−0), and
- The L-minus clock, a mechanical countdown to the time of launch (L−0).

Except for the last few minutes, which are highly automated and rigid, scheduled activities rarely take exactly the scheduled time, and the T-minus clock only corresponds approximately to the time until launch.

A hold is the suspension of the normal countdown process, during which the T-minus clock is stopped and no planned activities take place. This can be done to investigate a technical process that has gone wrong, or to intentionally delay the launch, e.g. because of bad weather at the launch pad. Most countdown schedules also include some pre-planned built-in holds. These provide an opportunity to perform non-launch activities, handle unexpected issues, or to catch up on the schedule if it is running long.

Under some circumstances, a countdown may be recycled to an earlier time. When that happens, launch personnel begin following the countdown checklist from the earlier point.

During countdown:

- Aerospace personnel bring the rocket vehicle to the launch site and load it with payload and propellants;
- Launch-center computers communicate with sensors in the rocket, which monitor important systems on the launch vehicle and payload;
- Launch personnel monitor the weather and wait for the launch window;
- Security personnel prevent unauthorized persons from entering the "keep-out" area.

The procedures for each launch are written carefully. For the Space Shuttle, a five-volume set, Shuttle Countdown (KSC S0007), often referred to as "S0007", was used. Rosie Carver, a technical writer for United Launch Alliance, has created at least 15,000 procedures for more than 300 missions since the Solar Maximum Mission, which launched Feb. 14, 1980. These documents are living documents, which reflect new issues and solutions as they develop. Each mission requires approximately 100 procedure books.

Proceeding with the countdown depends on several factors, such as the proper launch window, weather that permits a safe launch, and the rocket and payload working properly.

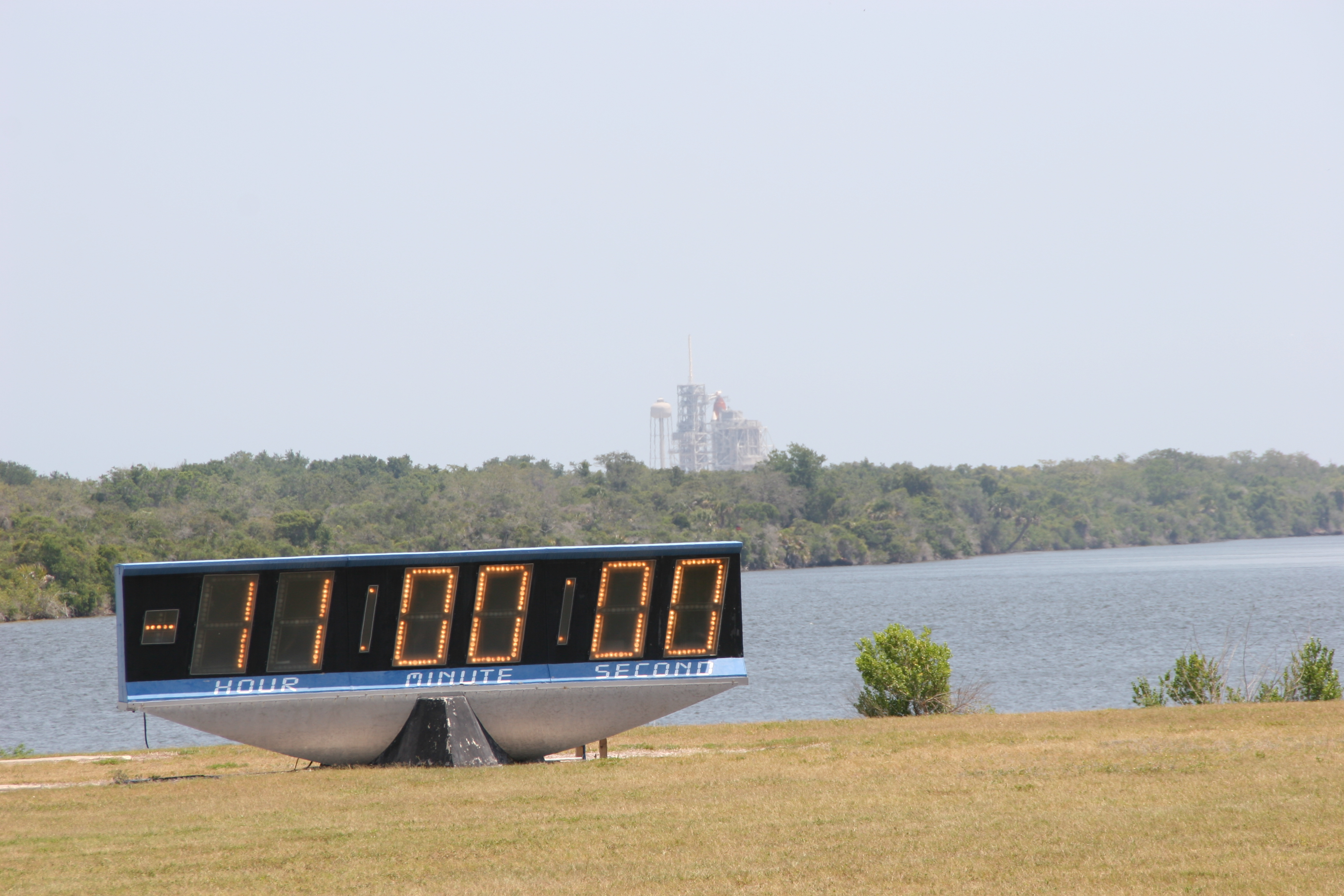
Countdown clock at NASA's Kennedy Space Center at L-11 hours (28 April 2011) of STS-134, Space Shuttle Endeavour

The launch weather guidelines involving the Space Shuttle and expendable rockets are similar in many areas, but a distinction is made for the individual characteristics of each. The criteria are broadly conservative and assure avoidance of possibly adverse conditions. They are reviewed for each launch. For the Space Shuttle, weather "outlooks" provided by the U. S. Air Force Range Weather Operations Facility at Cape Canaveral began at Launch minus 5 days in coordination with the NOAA National Weather Service Spaceflight Meteorology Group at the Johnson Space Center in Houston. These included weather trends and their possible effects on launch day. A formal prelaunch weather briefing was held on Launch minus 1 day, which was a specific weather briefing for all areas of Space Shuttle launch operations.

The launch window is a precise time during which aerospace personnel launch a rocket so the payload can reach the proper orbital destination.

During communications for a countdown, the launch team uses acronyms to keep channels open as much as possible. All Firing Room console positions are assigned unique 'call signs' that are used by the team for quick and positive identification of who is talking. For example, dialogue heard during the launch of a Delta II rocket carrying the Kepler Space Telescope on March 8, 2009, included:

Time: "T minus 3 minutes"
Launch Control (LC): "OSM, third stage S&A arm permit to close."
Operations Safety Manager (OSM): "Closed."
LC: "SSC, third stage S&A armed."
System Sequence Controller (SSC): "Armed."
LC: "Prop 1, vehicle fuel tank press open"
Prop 1: "Open."
LC: "Fuel umbilical purge to open."
Prop 1: "Open."
LC: "SSC, vent 1 heater control exit."
SSC: "Exit."
LC: "SSC, vent 2 heater control exit."
SSC: "Exit."
LC: "NSC reports spacecraft is go."
Mission Director: "Kepler spacecraft is go."
LC: "SSC - FTS bat one and two heater controls heaters off."
SSC: "Off."
LC: "Prop 1, pressurized first stage LOX tanks to relief."
Prop 1: "Pressurized."
LC: "Prop 2, top first stage LOX to 100 percent levels."
Prop 2: "Up and down, 100 percent."
Time: "Ninety seconds."
LC: "SSC, hydraulic external power to on."
SSC: "External."
Time: "Eighty seconds."
LC: "RCO, report range go for launch."
Range Control Officer (RCO): "Range go for launch."
Mission Director: "LC (Viera), you're go for launch."
LC: "Roger."

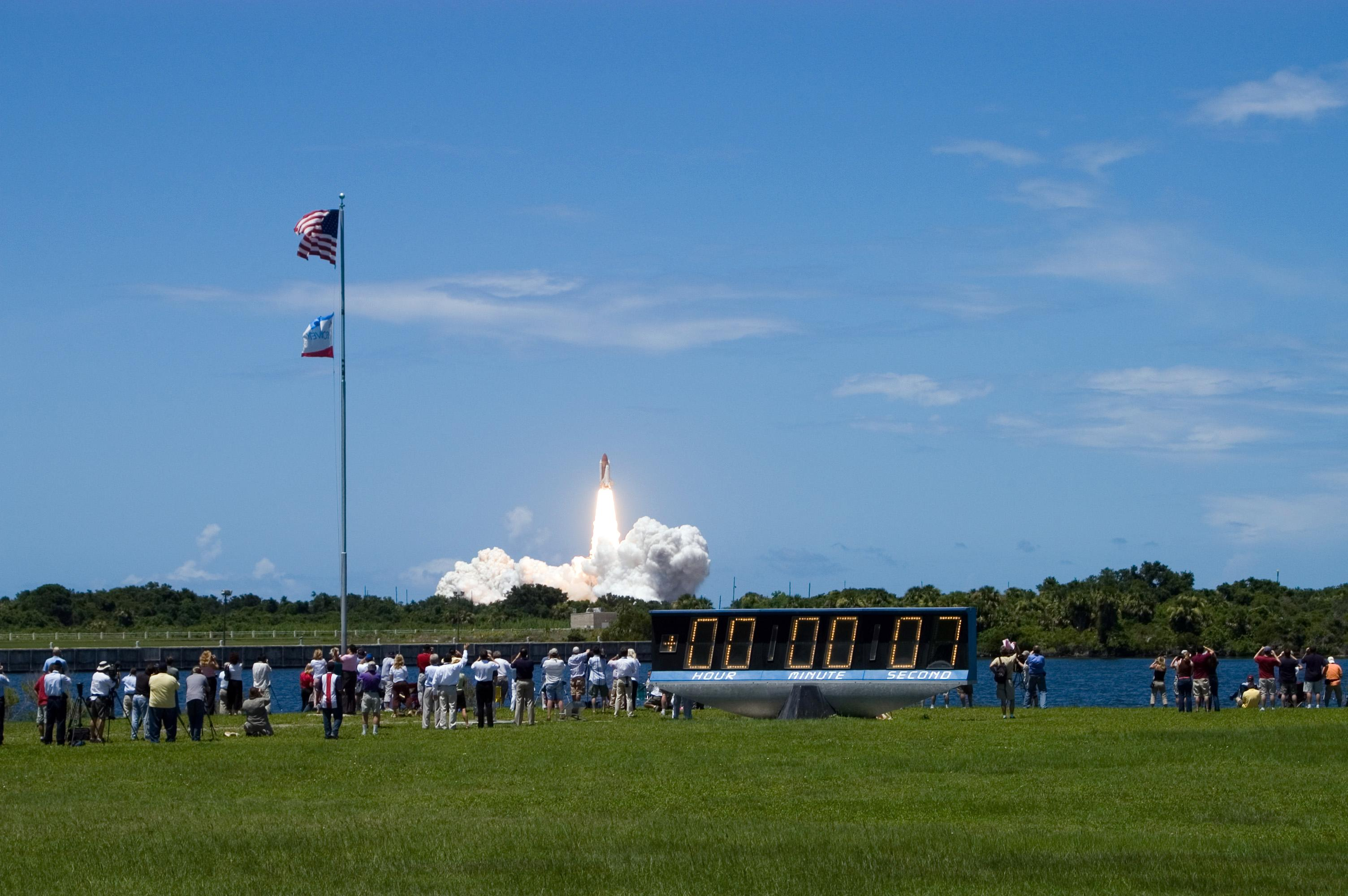
Seven seconds after launch of STS-121, the countdown clock at LC-39 at the Kennedy Space Center seen counting up, rather than down

In the context of a rocket launch, the "L minus Time" is the physical time before launch, e.g. "L minus 3 minutes and 40 seconds". "T minus Time" is a system to mark points at which actions necessary for the launch are planned - this time stops and starts as various hold points are entered, and so doesn't show the actual time to launch. The last ten seconds are usually counted down aloud "Ten seconds to liftoff. Nine, eight, seven, six, five, four, three, two, one." After a launch, most countdown clocks begin to show Mission Elapsed Time, which is typically shown as "T plus." The adjacent picture shows "+00:00:07", approximately seven seconds after liftoff.

The time T−0 is specifically the moment of launch commit, when it is no longer possible to prevent liftoff. This is necessarily slightly before the moment the rocket actually lifts off the launch pad. Liquid-fueled rocket engines (which can be turned off after ignition) are normally lit a few seconds before T−0 and brought to full throttle around T−0. Solid rocket motors, which cannot be extinguished, are lit at T−0 and achieve full power a few seconds later. If a rocket has hold-down clamps which can withstand full engine thrust, the moment the clamps are released defines T−0.

In Fritz Lang's film Frau im Mond, after each number the phrase "seconds to go" was repeated.

== Film ==
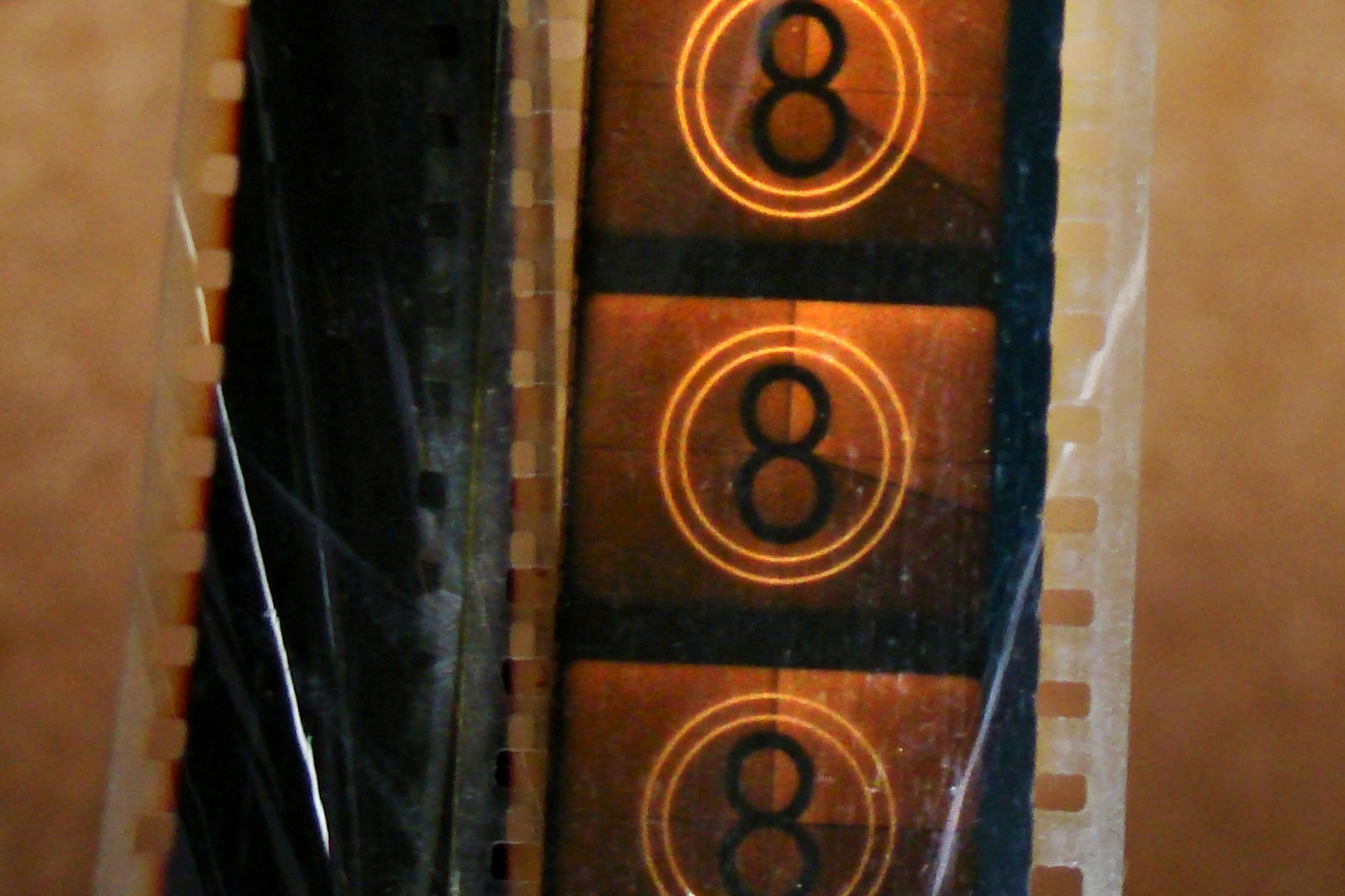
Newer (1959) SMPTE countdown on the head leader of a film reel

At the start of films, a countdown sequence is printed on the head leader, and is used to synchronize film reel changeovers (switching between reels of film). In film (but not television) the 'Academy Leader' countdown first used in 1930 is in units of feet rather than time units; it starts at 11 and ends at 3 where it cuts to black for the last few feet. In 1959, SMPTE leader was created and measures seconds, not feet. It starts at 8 and cuts to black on the first frame of 2, which is accompanied by a 'pop.' This leader eventually displaced the older Academy and was the only leader used by the end of the optical (film) projection era.

== Countdown timer ==
A countdown timer has been used by an organization/individual etc. in order to complete a task or mission before a deadline. Such devices have been used in various forms of media and popular culture such as game shows, videogames, movies etc.

== New Year's Eve ==
In many New Year's Eve celebrations, there is a countdown during the last seconds of the old year until the beginning of the new year. These countdowns usually end in fireworks. Some celebrations also have countdowns to midnight in preceding timezones.

== Independence Day ==
In Malaysia, the countdown is also used to celebrate independence day, with an event called Ambang Merdeka. The countdown was carried out at 11:59:50 pm and ended with chanting Merdeka 8 times and singing the national anthem.

== Palestine Square Countdown Clock ==
After Iran signed a nuclear pact in 2015 that had a timeline of 25 years to complete, Ayatollah Ali Khamenei responded by saying that it wouldn't take that long for Israel to cease existing. In 2017, the Palestine Square Countdown Clock was unveiled in Tehran, counting down the supposed time to Israel's demise.

== See also ==
- Count off
- Minutes to Midnight
- Timer
