= Proprietary hardware =

Computer hardware whose interface is controlled by the proprietor

Proprietary hardware is computer hardware whose interface is controlled by the proprietor, often under patent or trade-secret protection.

Historically, most early computer hardware was designed as proprietary until the 1980s, when IBM PC changed this paradigm. Earlier, in the 1970s, many vendors tried to challenge IBM's monopoly in the mainframe computer market by reverse engineering and producing hardware components electrically compatible with expensive equipment and (usually) able to run the same software. Those vendors were nicknamed plug compatible manufacturers (PCMs).

== See also ==
- Micro Channel architecture, a commonly cited historical example of proprietary hardware
- Vendor lock-in
- Proprietary device drivers
- Proprietary firmware
- Proprietary software
